= Azerbaijan in the Eurovision Song Contest 2025 =

- Eurovision Song Contest 2025
- Participating broadcaster: İctimai Televiziya (İTV)
- Country: Azerbaijan
- Selection process: Internal selection
- Announcement date: Artist: 4 February 2025; Song: 19 February 2025

Competing entry
- Song: "Run with U"
- Artist: Mamagama
- Songwriters: Hasan Hayadar; Roman Zee; Sefael Mishiyev

Placement
- Semi-final result: Failed to qualify (15th)

Participation chronology

Azerbaijan was represented at the Eurovision Song Contest 2025 with the song "Run with U", written by Hasan Hayadar, Roman Zee, and Sefael Mishiyev, and performed by the band Mamagama. The Azerbaijani participating broadcaster, İctimai Televiziya (İTV), internally selected its entry for the contest.

Azerbaijan was drawn to compete in the first semi-final of the Eurovision Song Contest, which took place on 13 May 2025. Performing during the show in position 10, Azerbaijan was not announced among the top 10 entries of the first semi-final and therefore did not qualify to compete in the final. It was later revealed that Azerbaijan placed last out of the 15 participating countries in the semi-final, with 7 points, marking Azerbaijan's worst result in the contest to date.

== Background ==
Prior to the 2025 contest, İctimai Televiziya (İTV) had participated in the Eurovision Song Contest representing Azerbaijan sixteen times since its first entry in 2008. It had won the contest on one occasion in 2011 with the song "Running Scared" performed by Ell and Nikki. Since its debut in 2008, it had had a string of successful results, qualifying to the final in every contest until in 2018 when it failed to qualify with the song "X My Heart" performed by Aisel. It had placed in the top ten seven times, including a third-place result in 2009 with the song "Always" performed by AySel and Arash, and a second-place result in 2013 with the song "Hold Me" performed by Farid Mammadov. In 2024, it failed to qualify to the final with the song "Özünlə apar" performed by Fahree featuring Ilkin Dovlatov.

As part of its duties as participating broadcaster, İTV organises the selection of its entry in the Eurovision Song Contest and broadcasts the event in the country. The broadcaster confirmed its intentions to participate at the 2025 contest on 3 August 2024. İTV had used various methods to select its entry in the past, including internal selections of both the artist and song, as well as national finals to select its artist followed by an internal selection to determine the song. Between 2011 and 2013, İTV organized a national final titled Milli seçim turu to select the performer, song or both for Eurovision. In 2014, the broadcaster utilised an existing talent show format titled Böyük səhnə where the winning performer would subsequently be given an internally selected song. Since 2015, İTV had internally selected both the artist and song, a procedure which continued for the selection of its 2025 entry.

== Before Eurovision ==
=== Internal selection ===
On 4 August 2024, İTV announced that both the artist and song that would represent Azerbaijan at the Eurovision Song Contest 2025 would be selected internally. Their announcement called for interested artists and songwriters were called upon to submit their applications and entries by 15 September 2024. Songwriters could be of any nationality. 154 submissions were received at the closing of the deadline (49% of which were from local songwriters), from which 12 were selected to proceed to the next stage. Potential performers reported by Azerbaijani media to have been shortlisted by İTV included Mehin Humbatova, Nataone and Murad Arif.

On 4 February 2025, İTV announced that the band Mamagama would represent Azerbaijan. The selection of Mamagama as the Azerbaijani Eurovision contestant was based on the decision of a jury panel consisting of national and international music industry experts; the national members were Elşad Xose (rapper), Diana Hajiyeva (who represented Azerbaijan in 2017), Aysel Teymurzadeh (who represented Azerbaijan in 2009), Heyder (DJ and producer), Faig Sujaddinov (composer), Rain Sultanov (musician), DJ Fateh (presenter and director of İctimai Radio) and Balakishi Gasimov (General Director of İTV). The song to be performed by Mamagama, "Run with U", was written by Hasan Hayadar, Roman Zee, and band member Sefael Mishiyev, and was presented on 19 February 2025 through the release of the official music video via the official Eurovision Song Contest's YouTube channel.

== At Eurovision ==
Azerbaijan was drawn into the first semi-final of the Eurovision Song Contest 2025, performing 10th.

=== Voting ===
==== Points awarded to Azerbaijan ====
Points awarded to Azerbaijan (Semi-final 1)
Score	Televote
12 points	
10 points	
8 points	
7 points	San Marino (Note: San Marino used a jury in the semi-finals.)
6 points	
5 points	
4 points	
3 points	
2 points	
1 point	

==== Points awarded by Azerbaijan ====
Points awarded by Azerbaijan (Semi-final 1)
Score	Televote
12 points	Cyprus
10 points	Estonia
8 points	Norway
7 points	Ukraine
6 points	Albania
5 points	San Marino
4 points	Sweden
3 points	Netherlands
2 points	Slovenia
1 point	Poland

Points awarded by Azerbaijan (Final)
Score	Televote	Jury
12 points	Israel	Israel
10 points	Austria	Italy
8 points	Estonia	Ukraine
7 points	Albania	Estonia
6 points	Norway	Portugal
5 points	Finland	Spain
4 points	Ukraine	Poland
3 points	Sweden	Netherlands
2 points	France	Germany
1 point	Malta	Switzerland

==== Detailed voting results ====
Each participating broadcaster assembles a five-member jury panel consisting of music industry professionals who are citizens of the country they represent. Each jury, and individual jury member, is required to meet a strict set of criteria regarding professional background, as well as diversity in gender and age. No member of a national jury was permitted to be related in any way to any of the competing acts in such a way that they cannot vote impartially and independently. The individual rankings of each jury member as well as the nation's televoting results were released shortly after the grand final.

The following members comprised the Azerbaijani jury:

- Azer Rauf Aydemir
- Ramil Adigozal Gasimov
- Tural Isa Bagmanov
- Ulviyya Firudin Babirli
- Ulviyya Ogtay Kerimova

Detailed voting results from Azerbaijan (Semi-final 1)
R/O	Country	Televote	
R/O	Country	Rank	Points
01	Iceland	12	
02	Poland	10	1
03	Slovenia	9	2
04	Estonia	2	10
05	Ukraine	4	7
06	Sweden	7	4
07	Portugal	11	
08	Norway	3	8
09	Belgium	13	
10	Azerbaijan		
11	San Marino	6	5
12	Albania	5	6
13	Netherlands	8	3
14	Croatia	14	
15	Cyprus	1	12

Detailed voting results from Azerbaijan (Final)
R/O	Country	Jury							Televote	
R/O	Country	Juror A	Juror B	Juror C	Juror D	Juror E	Rank	Points	Rank	Points
01	Norway	18	21	19	14	22	22		5	6
02	Luxembourg	13	20	14	16	25	20		22	
03	Estonia	2	3	22	4	8	4	7	3	8
04	Israel	1	2	1	1	7	1	12	1	12
05	Lithuania	21	12	21	18	17	21		14	
06	Spain	4	5	5	13	19	6	5	25	
07	Ukraine	3	1	9	6	4	3	8	7	4
08	United Kingdom	24	10	23	5	6	11		23	
09	Austria	10	9	15	15	11	15		2	10
10	Iceland	23	24	18	17	15	23		19	
11	Latvia	11	8	16	8	10	14		17	
12	Netherlands	5	7	17	7	12	8	3	13	
13	Finland	17	17	13	11	24	18		6	5
14	Italy	7	4	2	2	1	2	10	15	
15	Poland	16	23	4	3	21	7	4	11	
16	Germany	9	6	6	10	13	9	2	12	
17	Greece	20	22	20	22	18	24		16	
18	Armenia	26	26	26	26	26	26		26	
19	Switzerland	12	13	7	19	3	10	1	24	
20	Malta	14	18	12	12	14	16		10	1
21	Portugal	6	11	8	20	2	5	6	18	
22	Denmark	8	15	25	23	16	17		21	
23	Sweden	15	25	3	25	9	12		8	3
24	France	25	19	24	24	23	25		9	2
25	San Marino	19	14	11	21	20	19		20	
26	Albania	22	16	10	9	5	13		4	7
