= Azerbaijan in the Eurovision Song Contest 2024 =

- Eurovision Song Contest 2024
- Participating broadcaster: İctimai Televiziya (İTV)
- Country: Azerbaijan
- Selection process: Internal selection
- Announcement date: Artist: 7 March 2024; Song: 15 March 2024

Competing entry
- Song: "Özünlə apar"
- Artist: Fahree feat. Ilkin Dovlatov
- Songwriters: Edgar Ravinov; Fakhri Ismayilov; Hasan Haydar; Madina Salikh; Tamila Rzayeva

Placement
- Semi-final result: Failed to qualify (14th)

Participation chronology

Azerbaijan was represented at the Eurovision Song Contest 2024 with "Özünlə apar" performed by Fahree and featuring Ilkin Dovlatov. The Azerbaijani participant broadcaster, İctimai Televiziya (İTV), internally selected its entry for the contest.

Azerbaijan was drawn to compete in the first semi-final of the Eurovision Song Contest which took place on 7 May 2024. Performing during the show in position 13, "Özünlə apar" was not announced among the top 10 entries of the first semi-final and therefore did not qualify to compete in the final. It was later revealed that Azerbaijan placed fourteenth out of the 15 participating countries in the semi-final with 11 points.

== Background ==
Prior to the 2024 contest, İctimai Televiziya (İTV) had participated in the Eurovision Song Contest representing Azerbaijan fifteen times since its first entry in 2008. It had won the contest on one occasion in 2011 with the song "Running Scared" performed by Ell and Nikki. Since its debut in 2008, it had had a string of successful results, qualifying to the final in every contest until in 2018 when it failed to qualify with the song "X My Heart" performed by Aisel. It had placed in the top ten seven times, including a third-place result in 2009 with the song "Always" performed by AySel and Arash and a second-place result in 2013 with the song "Hold Me" performed by Farid Mammadov. In 2023, it failed to qualify to the final with the song "Tell Me More" performed by TuralTuranX.

As part of its duties as participating broadcaster, İTV organises the selection of its entry in the Eurovision Song Contest and broadcasts the event in the country. İTV had used various methods to select its entry in the past, including internal selections of both the artist and song, as well as national finals to select its artist followed by an internal selection to determine the song. Between 2011 and 2013, İTV organized a national final titled Milli seçim turu to select the performer, song or both for Eurovision. In 2014, the broadcaster utilised an existing talent show format titled Böyük səhnə where the winning performer would subsequently be given an internally selected song. Since 2015, it had internally selected both the artist and song that represented Azerbaijan. On 14 July 2023, İTV confirmed its participation in the 2024 contest and that its entry would again be selected internally.

== Before Eurovision ==
=== Internal selection ===
Upon confirming their participation in the 2024 contest, İTV opened a submission window for interested artists and songwriters, lasting until 30 September 2023. Performers without a song could not apply individually. Songs could be submitted in any language, and their authors are not required to be Azerbaijani nationals. A total of 214 song submissions were received by İTV, 88 of which were from Azerbaijani artists.

By 20 October 2023, sixteen acts were selected to take part in an audition round in Baku on 29 October 2023, when İTV announced the names of the fifteen auditioned artists (one having been unable to attend); among them was Aisel, who had previously represented Azerbaijan in the 2018 contest. The acts were judged by a panel which included 2009 Azerbaijani representative Aysel Teymurzadeh and Eurovision 2011 winners Ell and Nikki, as well as composers Faig Sujaddinov and Vagif Gerayzadeh, art director Ranar Musayev, and music producer DJ Fateh. On 6 November 2023, six artists were announced to have passed the auditions, shown below in bold. The Azerbaijani representative was chosen after consultations with focus groups of Eurovision fans, journalists and music professionals. In mid-February 2024, Eldar "Ell" Gasimov clarified that discussions involved international professionals from Asia and America and that the selection was approaching its end.

Reports in February 2024 suggested that Aisel with "Game of Chess" and Ilkin Dovlatov, Mila Miles & Etibar Asadli with "İnsanlar" were the two acts left in the running, however, on 7 March, Fahree was announced as the selected entrant, with the song, "Özünlə apar", revealed and released on 15 March. Prior to the release, it was anticipated that Ilkin Dovlatov, one of the shortlisted artists in the selection, would perform a part of the entry in the traditional Azerbaijani mugham style. "Özünlə apar" is the country's first entry for the contest to feature Azerbaijani as a major language.

Shortlisted artists
- **Aisel**
- Alesker
- Amrah Musayev
- Edgar Ravin
- **Emy Lia**
- **Fahree**
- **Ilkin Dovlatov, Mila Miles and Etibar Asadli**
- Lexa
- Mari
- **Qorqud**
- Rahib Mirzoev and Tofig Yadigar
- Rilaya
- Sabina Beyli
- **Sabina Guluzadeh**
- Tofig Hajiyev and Jamal Gurbanov

Internal selection finalists
Artist	Song	Songwriter(s)
Aisel	"Game of Chess"	Aysel Mammadova; Jeyhun Bayramli; Leyla Akhundova
Emy Lia	"Breathing for You"	Elvin Novruzov; Madina Salikh
**Fahree**	**"Özünlə apar"**	**Edgar Ravinov; Fakhri Ismayilov; Hasan Haydar; Madina Salikh; Tamila Rzayeva**
Ilkin Dovlatov, Mila Miles and Etibar Asadli	"İnsanlar"	Adil Rakidi; Etibar Asadli; Tamila Rzayeva
Qorqud	"Bridges in the Dark"	Elvin Novruzov; Nurlana Jafarova
Sabina Guluzadeh	—N/a	

== At Eurovision ==
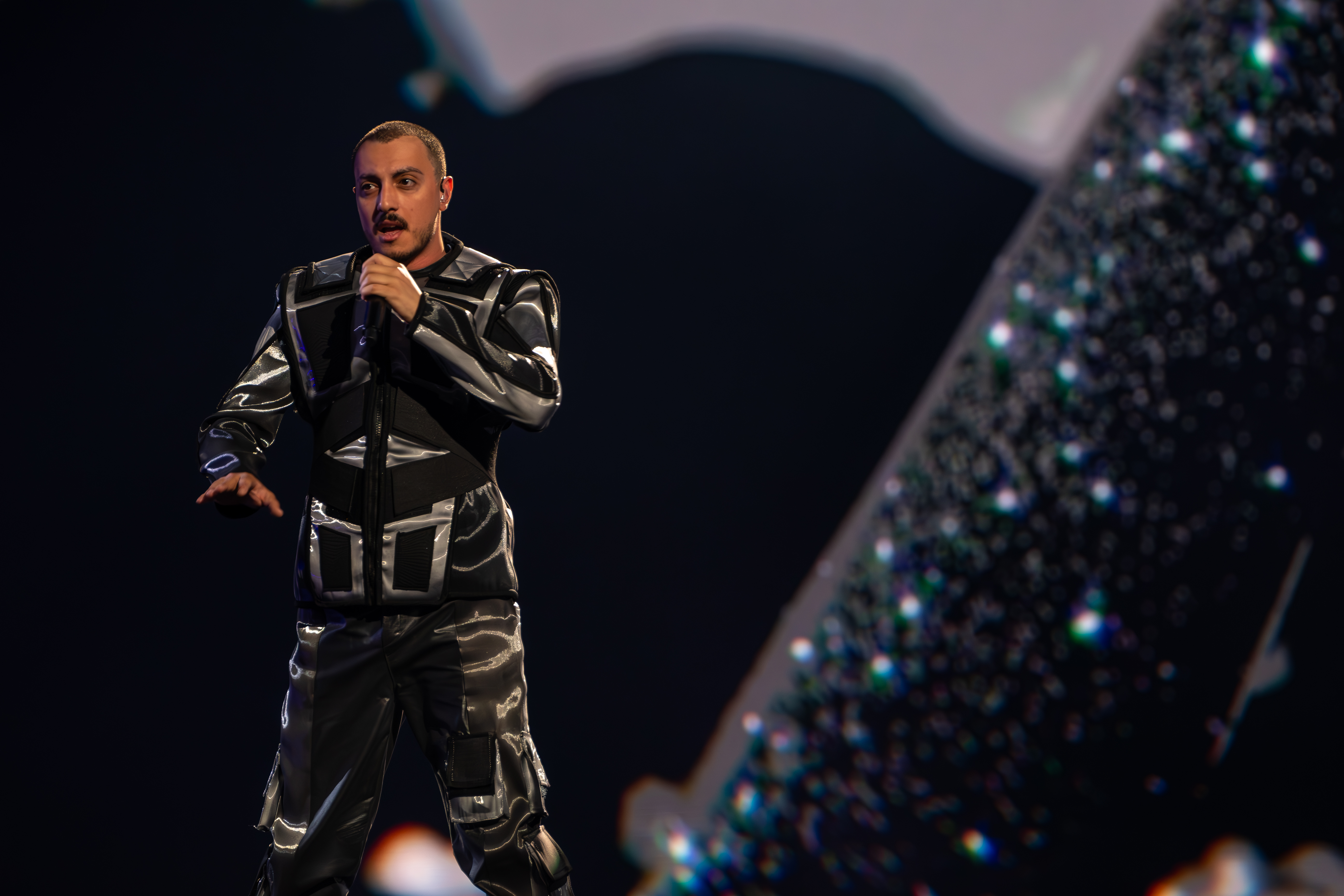
Fahree during a rehearsal before the first semi-final.

The Eurovision Song Contest 2024 took place at the Malmö Arena in Malmö, Sweden, and consisted of two semi-finals held on the respective dates of 7 and 9 May and the final on 11 May 2024. All nations with the exceptions of the host country and the "Big Five" (France, Germany, Italy, Spain and the United Kingdom) were required to qualify from one of two semi-finals in order to compete in the final; the top ten countries from each semi-final progress to the final. On 30 January 2024, an allocation draw was held to determine which of the two semi-finals, as well as which half of the show, each country would perform in; the European Broadcasting Union (EBU) split up the competing countries into different pots based on voting patterns from previous contests, with countries with favourable voting histories put into the same pot. Azerbaijan was scheduled for the second half of the first semi-final. The shows' producers then decided the running order for the semi-finals; Azerbaijan was set to perform in position 12.

In Azerbaijan, commentary for the contest on İTV was provided by Nurlana Jafarova.

=== Performance ===
Fahree and Ilkin Dovlatov took part in technical rehearsals on 28 April and 1 May, followed by dress rehearsals on 6 and 7 May. Their performance of "Özünlə apar" at the contest was staged by Yevhenii "Timó" Timokhin, who also directed the music video for the song, and featured Fahree in a black and silver armoured outfit amid blue and black lighting.

=== Semi-final ===
Azerbaijan performed in position 12, following the entry from Moldova and before the entry from Australia. The country was not announced among the top 10 entries in the semi-final and therefore failed to qualify to compete in the final. It was later revealed, that Azerbaijan placed 14th with 11 points.

=== Voting ===
Below is a breakdown of points awarded by and to Azerbaijan in the first semi-final and in the final. Voting during the three shows involved each country awarding sets of points from 1-8, 10 and 12: one from their professional jury and the other from televoting in the final vote, while the semi-final vote was based entirely on the vote of the public. The Azerbaijani jury consisted of Konul Arif Shukurova, Vagif Garayzadeh, Emil Guliyev, Aynishan Guliyeva, and Nigar Jamal, who won the 2011 contest for Azerbaijan. In the first semi-final, Azerbaijan placed 14th with 11 points. Over the course of the contest, Azerbaijan awarded its 12 points to Cyprus in the first semi-final, and to Switzerland (jury) and Croatia (televote) in the final.

İTV appointed Aysel Teymurzadeh, who represented Azerbaijan in the 2009 contest, as its spokesperson to announce the Azerbaijani jury's votes in the final.

==== Points awarded to Azerbaijan ====
Points awarded to Azerbaijan (Semi-final 1)
Score	Televote
12 points	
10 points	
8 points	
7 points	
6 points	Moldova
5 points	
4 points	
3 points	
2 points	
1 point	Finland; Lithuania; Poland; Serbia; Ukraine

==== Points awarded by Azerbaijan ====
Points awarded by Azerbaijan (Semi-final 1)
Score	Televote
12 points	Cyprus
10 points	Ukraine
8 points	Luxembourg
7 points	Croatia
6 points	Ireland
5 points	Serbia
4 points	Portugal
3 points	Lithuania
2 points	Moldova
1 point	Slovenia

Points awarded by Azerbaijan (Final)
Score	Televote	Jury
12 points	Croatia	Switzerland
10 points	Switzerland	Ireland
8 points	Ukraine	Luxembourg
7 points	Israel	Georgia
6 points	Cyprus	Italy
5 points	Georgia	Sweden
4 points	Ireland	Croatia
3 points	Italy	Slovenia
2 points	France	Cyprus
1 point	Greece	Ukraine

==== Detailed voting results ====
Each participating broadcaster assembles a five-member jury panel consisting of music industry professionals who are citizens of the country they represent. Each jury, and individual jury member, is required to meet a strict set of criteria regarding professional background, as well as diversity in gender and age. No member of a national jury was permitted to be related in any way to any of the competing acts in such a way that they cannot vote impartially and independently. The individual rankings of each jury member as well as the nation's televoting results were released shortly after the grand final.

The following members comprised the Azerbaijani jury:

- Konul Arif Shukurova
- Vagif Garayzadeh
- Emil Guliyev
- Aynishan Guliyeva
- Nigar Jamal

Detailed voting results from Azerbaijan (Semi-final 1)
R/O	Country	Televote	
R/O	Country	Rank	Points
01	Cyprus	1	12
02	Serbia	6	5
03	Lithuania	8	3
04	Ireland	5	6
05	Ukraine	2	10
06	Poland	14	
07	Croatia	4	7
08	Iceland	13	
09	Slovenia	10	1
10	Finland	12	
11	Moldova	9	2
12	Azerbaijan		
13	Australia	11	
14	Portugal	7	4
15	Luxembourg	3	8

Detailed voting results from Azerbaijan (Final)
R/O	Country	Jury							Televote	
R/O	Country	Juror A	Juror B	Juror C	Juror D	Juror E	Rank	Points	Rank	Points
01	Sweden	19	5	4	3	12	6	5	13	
02	Ukraine	8	7	8	10	15	10	1	3	8
03	Germany	24	13	16	4	14	16		14	
04	Luxembourg	2	14	9	1	13	3	8	15	
~~05~~	~~Netherlands~~ ‡ (Note: The Netherlands was disqualified prior to the final.)	~~20~~	~~9~~	~~19~~	~~6~~	~~24~~	~~18~~		N/A	
06	Israel	11	23	14	5	7	12		4	7
07	Lithuania	21	12	15	11	23	21		11	
08	Spain	9	26	23	12	25	22		16	
09	Estonia	25	15	17	13	22	23		17	
10	Ireland	7	3	2	25	2	2	10	7	4
11	Latvia	23	16	25	14	21	24		22	
12	Greece	5	11	24	15	19	17		10	1
13	United Kingdom	6	25	5	16	18	13		19	
14	Norway	18	10	10	17	5	14		12	
15	Italy	3	4	21	18	4	5	6	8	3
16	Serbia	13	17	7	19	11	19		18	
17	Finland	22	18	18	20	20	25		20	
18	Portugal	12	8	11	7	10	11		24	
19	Armenia	26	24	26	26	26	26		25	
20	Cyprus	10	19	6	8	6	9	2	5	6
21	Switzerland	16	2	1	21	1	1	12	2	10
22	Slovenia	17	22	3	22	3	8	3	23	
23	Croatia	4	1	13	24	17	7	4	1	12
24	Georgia	1	21	22	2	9	4	7	6	5
25	France	15	6	12	23	8	15		9	2
26	Austria	14	20	20	9	16	20		21	
