= Mamagama =

Azerbaijani music band

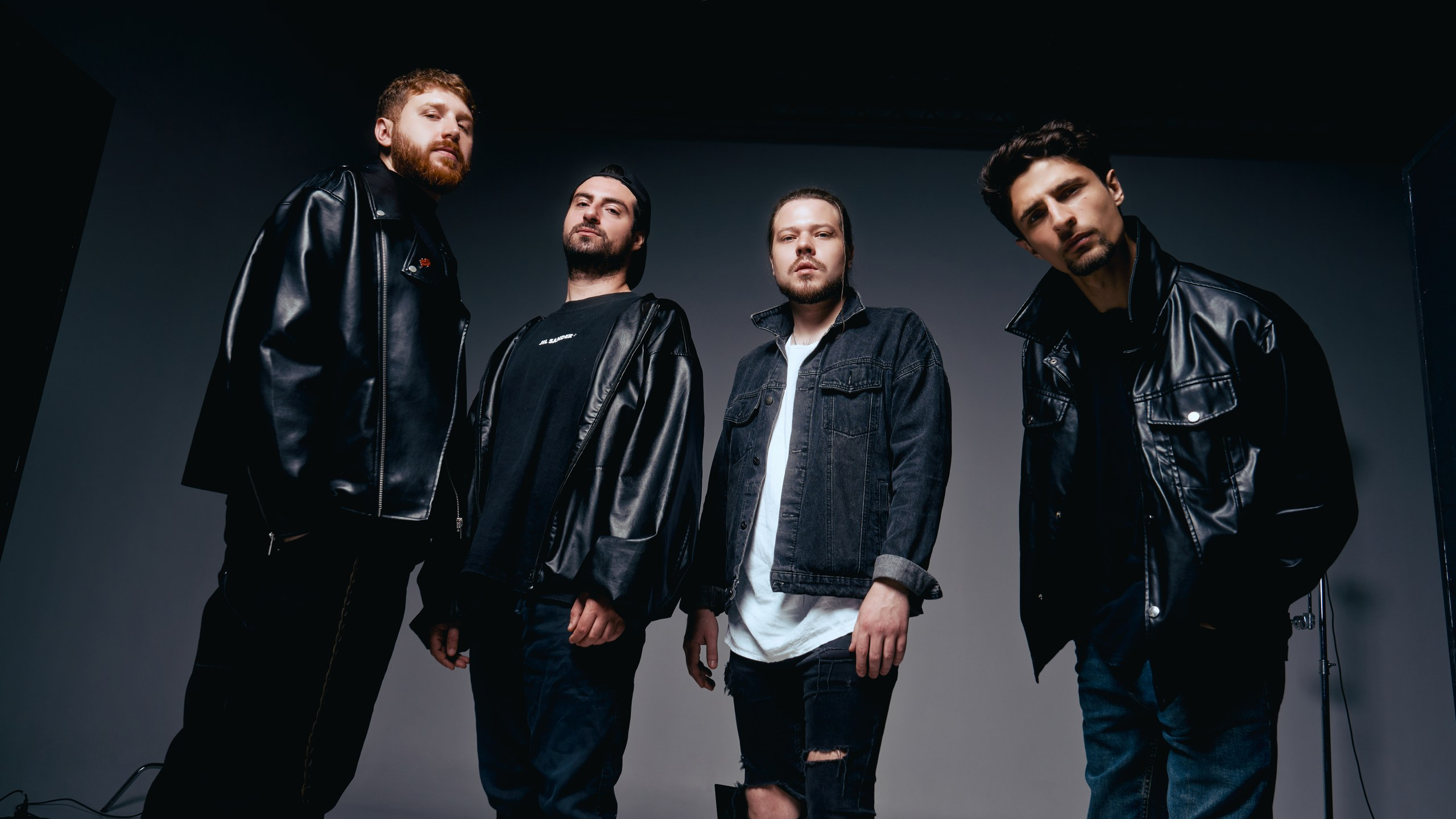
- Mamagama in 2025

Background information
- Origin: Baku, Azerbaijan
- Genres: Indie pop; alternative rock
- Years active: 2021–present
- Members: Asaf Mishiyev; Hasan Heydar; Arif Imanov; Roman Zilianev
- Past members: Klim Gudin

Mamagama is an Azerbaijani musical band formed in 2021 in Baku. The lineup of the band consists of vocalist Asaf Mishiyev, guitarist Hasan Heydar and drummer Arif Imanov. The band is known for its unique fusion of rock, pop, and traditional Azerbaijan music. Mamagama represented Azerbaijan in the Eurovision Song Contest 2025 with the song "Run with U".

== Career ==
Formed in 2021 in Baku, Mamagama consists of members with prior experience in various musical ensembles. The group quickly gained recognition by performing at several international festivals.

The vocalist of the band, Asaf Mishiyev, participated in the 2020 season of the project "The Voice." He reached the knockout round in Polina Gagarina's team.

In 2022, Mamagama participated in Kënga Magjike, one of Albania’s premier music festivals, alongside Festivali i Këngës. Their performance of the single "Dreamer" earned them the first prize in the "International Artists" category. Later that year, they applied to represent Azerbaijan in the Eurovision Song Contest 2023. Although they were selected as one of the five final candidates, İctimai Television (İTV) ended up choosing the duo TuralTuranX to represent the country in Liverpool.

On 4 February 2025, İTV announced that Mamagama had been internally chosen to represent Azerbaijan in the Eurovision Song Contest 2025 in Basel, Switzerland. Their song, "Run with U", was released on 19 February 2025. They performed in the first semi-final on 13 May 2025, where they failed to qualify to the grand final, finishing 15th out of 15 with 7 points, the worst result Azerbaijan had ever achieved at the contest.

On May 30, 2025, they released their debut EP "37".

== Musical style ==
Mamagama's music blends traditional musical elements with contemporary styles, incorporating influences from indie pop and alternative rock to create a unique and dynamic sound.

This fusion is further enriched by the cultural background of the band's lead singer, Asaf Mishiyev, who is of Mountain Jewish heritage. Drawing from the influence of Jewish artists like Bob Dylan and Amy Winehouse, alongside the rich musical heritage of Azerbaijan, Mishiyev infuses the band's music with profound depth and emotional resonance.

== Members ==
Current

- Asaf Mishiyev (Azerbaijani: Asəf Mişiyev) – vocalist
- Hasan Heydar (Azerbaijani: Həsən Heydər) – bass guitarist
- Arif Imanov (Azerbaijani: Arif İmanov) – drummer
- Roman Zilianev (Azerbaijani: Roman Zilyanev) – guitarist

Former

- Klim Gudin – bass guitarist

== Discography ==
Mamagama's catalogue consists of six singles and one EP

Title	Year
"My Medicine"	2022
"Sleep"	2022
"Dreamer"	2022
"River"	2023
"This Is for You"	2023
"Run With U"	2025
"Reyhan"	2026

EP's

Title	Year
37	2025

== Awards and nominations ==
Year	Award	Category	Nominee(s)	Result	Ref.
2025	Eurovision Awards	Certified Banger	Themselves	Nominated	

Awards and achievements
Preceded by Fahree feat. Ilkin Dovlatov with "Özünlə apar"	Azerbaijan in the Eurovision Song Contest; 2025	Succeeded by Jiva with "Just Go"
