= Azerbaijan in the Eurovision Song Contest 2023 =

- Eurovision Song Contest 2023
- Country: Azerbaijan
- Selection process: Internal selection
- Announcement date: Artist: 9 March 2023; Song: 13 March 2023

Competing entry
- Song: "Tell Me More"
- Artist: TuralTuranX
- Songwriters: Nihad Aliyev; Tunar Taghiyev; Tural Bağmanov; Turan Bağmanov

Placement
- Semi-final result: Failed to qualify (14th)

Participation chronology

Azerbaijan was represented at the Eurovision Song Contest 2023 with the song "Tell Me More" performed by the duo TuralTuranX which was internally selected by the Azerbaijani broadcaster İctimai Television (İTV) to represent the nation at the 2023 contest. TuralTuranX's selection as the Azerbaijani Eurovision entrant was announced on 9 March 2023, while the song "Tell Me More" was presented to the public on 13 March 2023.

Azerbaijan was drawn to compete in the first semi-final of the Eurovision Song Contest which took place on 9 May 2023. Performing during the show in position 12, "Tell Me More" was not announced among the top 10 entries of the first semi-final and therefore did not qualify to compete in the final. It was later revealed that Azerbaijan had placed fourteenth out of the 15 participating countries in the semi-final with 4 points.

== Background ==
Prior to the 2023 contest, Azerbaijan had participated in the Eurovision Song Contest fourteen times since its first entry in 2008. Azerbaijan had won the contest on one occasion in 2011 with the song "Running Scared" performed by Ell and Nikki. Since their debut in 2008, Azerbaijan has had a string of successful results, qualifying to the final in every contest until in 2018 when they failed to qualify with the song "X My Heart" performed by Aisel. Azerbaijan has placed in the top ten seven times, including a third-place result in 2009 with the song "Always" performed by AySel and Arash and a second-place result in 2013 with the song "Hold Me" performed by Farid Mammadov. In 2022, Azerbaijan placed sixteenth with the song "Fade to Black" performed by Nadir Rustamli.

The Azerbaijani national broadcaster, İctimai Television (İTV), broadcasts the event within Azerbaijan and organises the selection process for the nation's entry. İTV confirmed their intentions to participate at the 2023 Eurovision Song Contest on 11 October 2022. Azerbaijan had used various methods to select the Azerbaijani entry in the past, including internal selections of both the artist and song, as well as national finals to select their artist followed by an internal selection to determine the song. Between 2011 and 2013, Azerbaijan organized a national final titled Milli Seçim Turu to select the performer, song or both for Eurovision. In 2014, the broadcaster utilised an existing talent show format titled Böyük Səhnə where the winning performer would subsequently be given an internally selected song. Since 2015, the broadcaster internally selected both the artist and song that represented Azerbaijan, a procedure which continued for the selection of their 2023 entry.

== Before Eurovision ==
=== Internal selection ===
Both the artist and song that represented Azerbaijan at the Eurovision Song Contest 2023 was selected internally by İTV. On 8 December 2022, interested artists and songwriters were called upon to submit their applications and entries by 15 January 2023. Songwriters could be of any nationality, but submissions from Azerbaijani songwriters were preferred. Head of Delegation Vasif Mammadov stated: "Our goal and desire with this is to have local composer's music featured in the competition. Based on the selection process, if local and foreign songs meet the same criteria, we will prefer the local song. That is, we really want the music of Azerbaijani composers to be played in the competition. Let's demonstrate that we also have talented composers. I hope this can serve as a stimulus for years to come." Following accusations from singer Rauf Kingsley who claimed that İTV had already selected the band Mamagama to represent Azerbaijan due to links with music producer for the Azerbaijani delegation Eldar Gasimov, the broadcaster revealed on 1 February 2023 that five potential performers had been shortlisted with their names being announced on 2 February 2023.

On 9 March 2023, İTV announced that the duo TuralTuranX would represent Azerbaijan, performing the song "Tell Me More". The selection of TuralTuranX, consisting of twin brothers Tural and Turan Bağmanov, as the Azerbaijani Eurovision contestant was based on the decision of İTV and a focus group, while "Tell Me More" was selected from over 200 submissions from local and international songwriters in a similar method. "Tell Me More" was written by TuralTuranX themselves together with Nihad Aliyev and Tunar Taghiyev, and was the first locally produced Azerbaijani entry since their debut in 2008. The song was presented on 13 March 2023 via the release of the official music video.

Results of the internal selection
| Artist | Song | Songwriter(s) |
|---|---|---|
| Azer Nasibov | Unknown | |
| Humay Aslanova and Amrah Musayev | Unknown | |
| Leyla Izzatova | "Gəl" | Nazim Mehdiyev, Leyla Izzatova, Ayten Ismikhanova |
| Mamagama | "River" | Madina Salikh, Roman Zilyanev, Safael Mishiyev |
| TuralTuranX | "Tell Me More" | Nihad Aliyev, Tunar Taghiyev, Tural Bağmanov, Turan Bağmanov |

=== Promotion ===
TuralTuranX made several appearances across Europe to specifically promote "Tell Me More" as the Azerbaijani Eurovision entry. Between 2 and 4 April, TuralTuranX took part in promotional activities in Tel Aviv, Israel and performed during the Israel Calling event held at Hangar 11 of the Tel Aviv Port. On 15 April, TuralTuranX performed during the Eurovision in Concert event which was held at the AFAS Live venue in Amsterdam, Netherlands and hosted by Cornald Maas and Hila Noorzai. On 16 April, TuralTuranX performed during the London Eurovision Party, which was held at the Here at Outernet venue in London, United Kingdom and hosted by Nicki French and Paddy O'Connell.

== At Eurovision ==
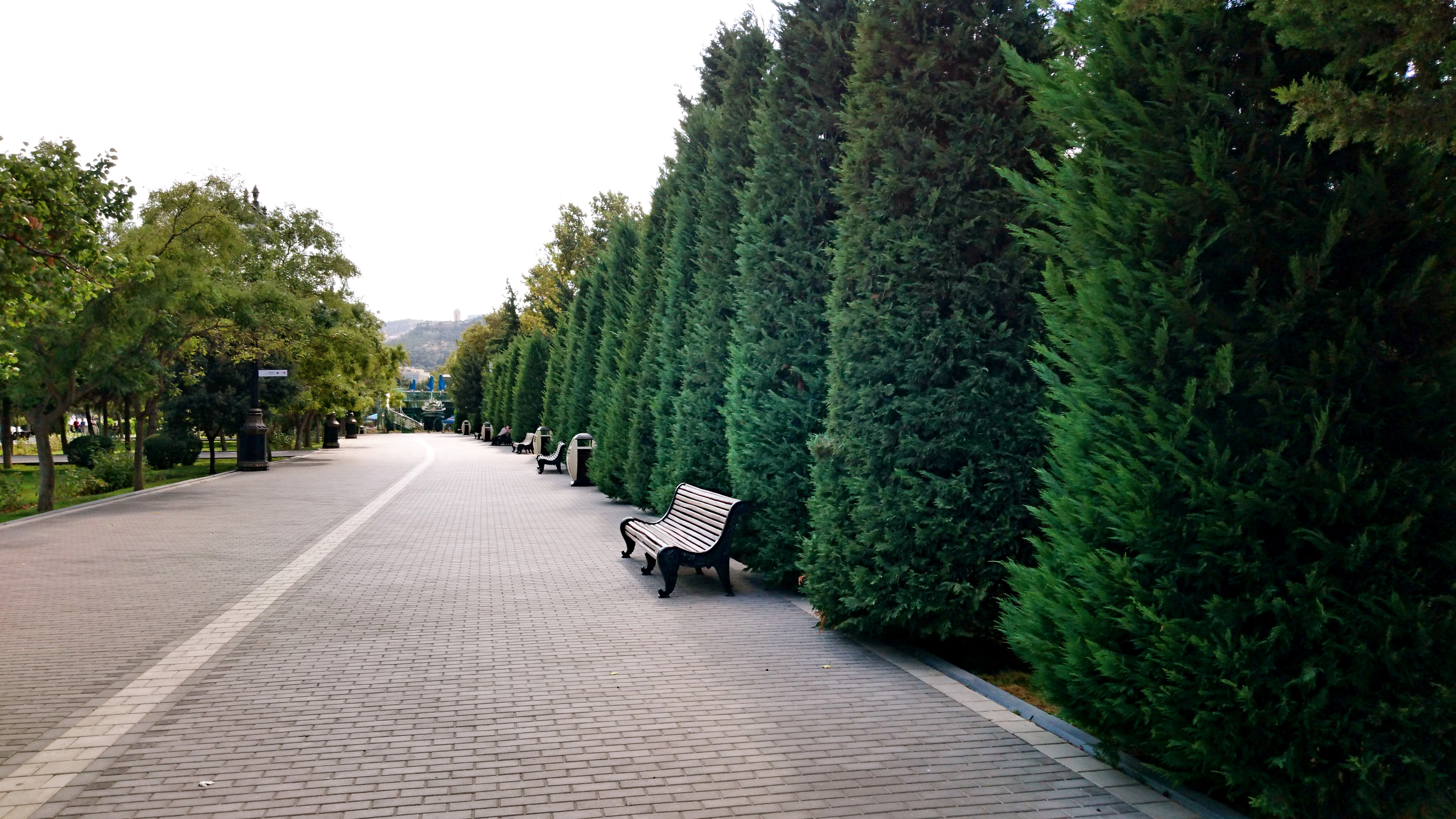
A video postcard introduced TuralTuranX's performance in the first semi-final of the Eurovision Song Contest 2023. The postcard was filmed at the Baku Boulevard in March 2023 in collaboration with the host broadcaster BBC. The Centenary Square in Birmingham and the Maidan Nezalezhnosti in Kyiv also featured in the Azerbaijani postcard.

According to Eurovision rules, all nations with the exceptions of the reigning champion nation (Ukraine) and the "Big Five" (France, Germany, Italy, Spain and the United Kingdom) are required to qualify from one of two semi-finals in order to compete for the final; the top ten countries from each semi-final progress to the final. The European Broadcasting Union (EBU) split up the competing countries into six different pots based on voting patterns from previous contests, with countries with favourable voting histories put into the same pot. On 31 January 2023, an allocation draw was held, which placed each country into one of the two semi-finals, and determined which half of the show they would perform in. Azerbaijan has been placed into the first semi-final, to be held on 9 May 2023, and has been scheduled to perform in the second half of the show.

Once all the competing songs for the 2023 contest had been released, the running order for the semi-finals was decided by the shows' producers rather than through another draw, so that similar songs were not placed next to each other. Azerbaijan was set to perform in position 12, following the entry from Sweden and before the entry from Czech Republic.

The two semi-finals and final were broadcast in Azerbaijan on İTV with commentary by Azer Suleymanli. The Azerbaijani spokesperson, who announced the top 12-point score awarded by the Azerbaijani jury during the final, was Narmin Salmanova.

=== Semi-final ===
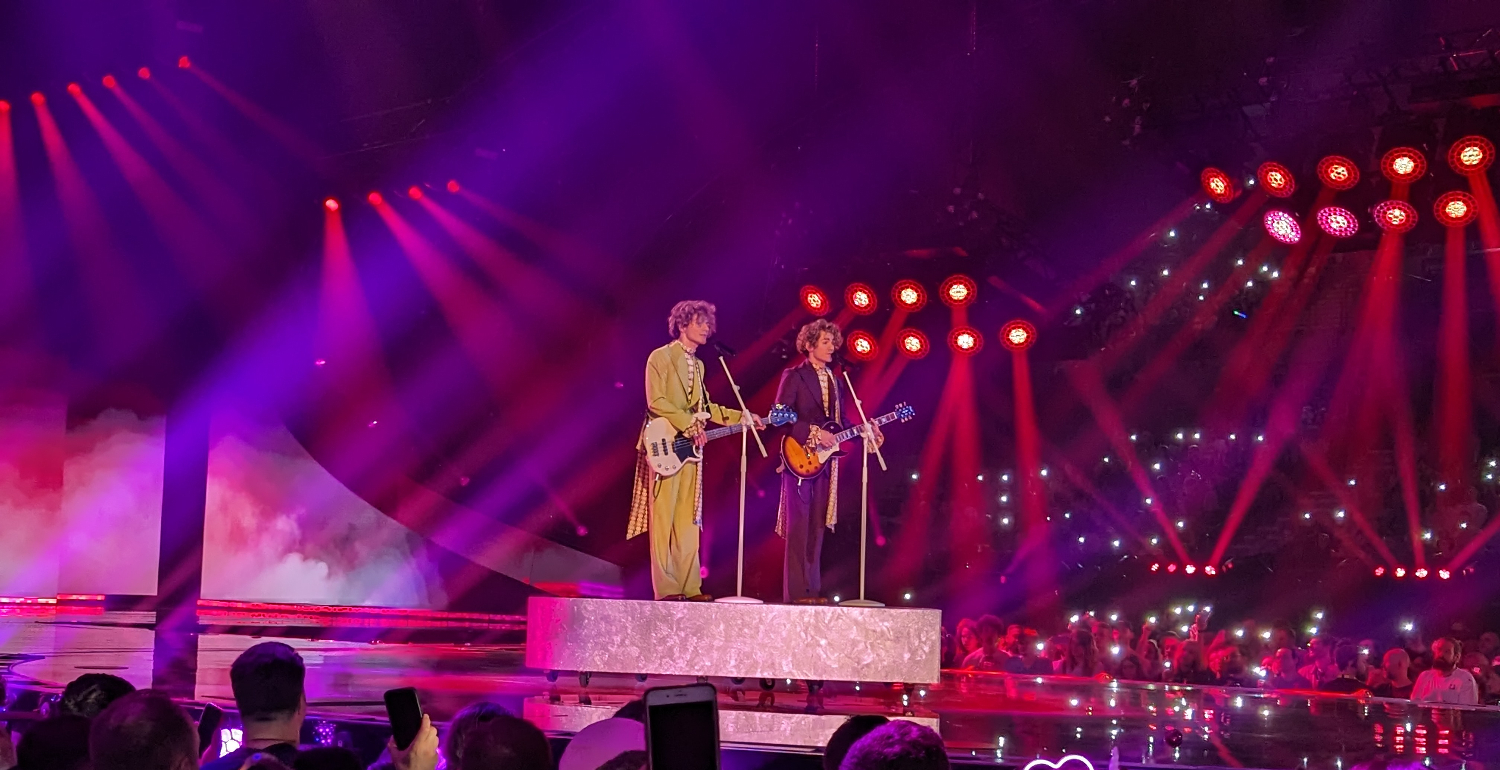
TuralTuranX during a rehearsal before the first semi-final

TuralTuranX took part in technical rehearsals on 1 and 3 May, followed by dress rehearsals on 8 and 9 May. This included the jury show on 8 May where the professional back-up juries of each country watched and voted in a result used if any issues with public televoting occurred.

The Azerbaijani performance featured the members of TuralTuranX dressed in matching designed shirts with contrasting jackets and trousers performing on a raised heart-shaped podium at the centre stage. The LED screens displayed 60s styling and the performance also incorporated multi-hued spotlights as well as a black and white camera effect at the beginning. The performance was directed by Mads Enggaard who worked as the stage director for Azerbaijan since 2019.

At the end of the show, Azerbaijan was not announced among the top 10 entries in the first semi-final and therefore failed to qualify to compete in the final. It was later revealed that Azerbaijan placed fourteenth in the semi-final, receiving a total of 4 points.

=== Voting ===
Voting during the three shows involved each country awarding sets of points from 1-8, 10 and 12: one from their professional jury and the other from televoting in the final vote, while the semi-final vote was based entirely on the vote of the public. Each nation's jury consisted of five music industry professionals who are citizens of the country they represent. This jury judged each entry based on: vocal capacity; the stage performance; the song's composition and originality; and the overall impression by the act. In addition, each member of a national jury may only take part in the panel once every three years, and no jury was permitted to discuss of their vote with other members or be related in any way to any of the competing acts in such a way that they cannot vote impartially and independently. The individual rankings of each jury member in an anonymised form as well as the nation's televoting results were released shortly after the grand final.

Below is a breakdown of points awarded to Azerbaijan and awarded by Azerbaijan in the first semi-final and grand final of the contest, and the breakdown of the jury voting and televoting conducted during the two shows:

==== Points awarded to Azerbaijan ====
Points awarded to Azerbaijan (Semi-final 1)
| Score | Country |
|---|---|
| 12 points | |
| 10 points | |
| 8 points | |
| 7 points | |
| 6 points | |
| 5 points | |
| 4 points | |
| 3 points | |
| 2 points | Latvia |
| 1 point | Croatia; Israel |

==== Points awarded by Azerbaijan ====
Points awarded by Azerbaijan (Semi-final)
| Score | Country |
|---|---|
| 12 points | Israel |
| 10 points | Sweden |
| 8 points | Finland |
| 7 points | Switzerland |
| 6 points | Latvia |
| 5 points | Czech Republic |
| 4 points | Moldova |
| 3 points | Serbia |
| 2 points | Norway |
| 1 point | Netherlands |

Points awarded by Azerbaijan (Final)
| Score | Televote | Jury |
|---|---|---|
| 12 points | Israel | Israel |
| 10 points | Sweden | Sweden |
| 8 points | Finland | Albania |
| 7 points | Ukraine | Spain |
| 6 points | Cyprus | Italy |
| 5 points | Slovenia | Australia |
| 4 points | Italy | Switzerland |
| 3 points | Czech Republic | Finland |
| 2 points | Norway | Ukraine |
| 1 point | Switzerland | Estonia |

==== Detailed voting results ====
The following members comprised the Azerbaijani jury:

- Anar Yusufov
- Emin Useynov
- Gulyaz Mammadova
- Tarana Muradova
- Zumrud Dadashzadeh

Detailed voting results from Azerbaijan (Semi-final 1)
| R/O | Country | Televote | |
| R/O | Country | Rank | Points |
|---|---|---|---|
| 01 | Norway | 9 | 2 |
| 02 | Malta | 11 | |
| 03 | Serbia | 8 | 3 |
| 04 | Latvia | 5 | 6 |
| 05 | Portugal | 13 | |
| 06 | Ireland | 14 | |
| 07 | Croatia | 12 | |
| 08 | Switzerland | 4 | 7 |
| 09 | Israel | 1 | 12 |
| 10 | Moldova | 7 | 4 |
| 11 | Sweden | 2 | 10 |
| 12 | Azerbaijan | | |
| 13 | Czech Republic | 6 | 5 |
| 14 | Netherlands | 10 | 1 |
| 15 | Finland | 3 | 8 |

Detailed voting results from Azerbaijan (Final)
| R/O | Country | Jury | | | | | | | Televote | |
| R/O | Country | Juror 1 | Juror 2 | Juror 3 | Juror 4 | Juror 5 | Rank | Points | Rank | Points |
|---|---|---|---|---|---|---|---|---|---|---|
| 01 | Austria | 12 | 23 | 15 | 10 | 16 | 18 | | 19 | |
| 02 | Portugal | 13 | 10 | 10 | 11 | 26 | 17 | | 26 | |
| 03 | Switzerland | 14 | 9 | 3 | 14 | 13 | 7 | 4 | 10 | 1 |
| 04 | Poland | 16 | 25 | 26 | 17 | 25 | 23 | | 11 | |
| 05 | Serbia | 7 | 19 | 9 | 15 | 8 | 15 | | 17 | |
| 06 | France | 18 | 22 | 24 | 25 | 23 | 26 | | 14 | |
| 07 | Cyprus | 6 | 8 | 18 | 7 | 21 | 13 | | 5 | 6 |
| 08 | Spain | 5 | 6 | 1 | 5 | 10 | 4 | 7 | 13 | |
| 09 | Sweden | 2 | 13 | 6 | 2 | 2 | 2 | 10 | 2 | 10 |
| 10 | Albania | 3 | 15 | 2 | 1 | 11 | 3 | 8 | 20 | |
| 11 | Italy | 4 | 16 | 5 | 3 | 6 | 5 | 6 | 7 | 4 |
| 12 | Estonia | 11 | 3 | 11 | 13 | 19 | 10 | 1 | 12 | |
| 13 | Finland | 9 | 11 | 14 | 26 | 3 | 8 | 3 | 3 | 8 |
| 14 | Czech Republic | 21 | 21 | 17 | 20 | 9 | 20 | | 8 | 3 |
| 15 | Australia | 23 | 1 | 8 | 22 | 7 | 6 | 5 | 23 | |
| 16 | Belgium | 20 | 5 | 13 | 23 | 5 | 11 | | 24 | |
| 17 | Armenia | 22 | 18 | 21 | 24 | 20 | 24 | | 25 | |
| 18 | Moldova | 19 | 12 | 16 | 16 | 12 | 19 | | 16 | |
| 19 | Ukraine | 8 | 14 | 7 | 6 | 15 | 9 | 2 | 4 | 7 |
| 20 | Norway | 10 | 24 | 19 | 9 | 4 | 14 | | 9 | 2 |
| 21 | Germany | 25 | 2 | 12 | 21 | 14 | 12 | | 18 | |
| 22 | Lithuania | 17 | 20 | 23 | 18 | 22 | 22 | | 22 | |
| 23 | Israel | 1 | 4 | 4 | 4 | 1 | 1 | 12 | 1 | 12 |
| 24 | Slovenia | 24 | 17 | 20 | 12 | 17 | 21 | | 6 | 5 |
| 25 | Croatia | 26 | 26 | 25 | 19 | 18 | 25 | | 15 | |
| 26 | United Kingdom | 15 | 7 | 22 | 8 | 24 | 16 | | 21 | |
