= Azerbaijan in the Eurovision Song Contest =

- Eurovision Song Contest
- Participating broadcaster: İctimai Television (İTV)

Participation summary
- Appearances: 18 (13 finals)
- First appearance: 2008
- Highest placement: 1st: 2011
- Host: 2012
- Participation history: 2008; 2009; 2010; 2011; 2012; 2013; 2014; 2015; 2016; 2017; 2018; 2019; ~~2020~~; 2021; 2022; 2023; 2024; 2025; 2026
- Azerbaijan's page at Eurovision.com
- For the most recent participation see Azerbaijan in the Eurovision Song Contest 2026

Azerbaijan has been represented at the Eurovision Song Contest 18 times since making its debut in 2008. The Azerbaijani participating broadcaster in the contest is İctimai Television (İTV). Azerbaijan was the last country in the Caucasus to debut in the contest and the first to win.

Azerbaijan has won the contest once, in 2011, with "Running Scared" performed by Ell and Nikki setting the record for the lowest average score for a winning song under the 12-points voting system, with 5.26 points per country. The country achieved five consecutive top-five results in the contest between 2009 and 2013, finishing third (2009) and fifth (2010) before its 2011 win and fourth (2012) and second (2013) following its win. Azerbaijan has failed to advance from the semi-finals on five occasions, in 2018 and in every edition since 2023.

== Participation ==
Prior to Azerbaijan's debut in the Eurovision Song Contest, broadcaster Azerbaijan Television (AzTV) expressed interest in participating in the 2007 contest, but the rules did not allow this as AzTV was not an active member of the European Broadcasting Union (EBU). AzTV was denied active EBU membership on 18 June 2007, as it was considered too connected to the Azerbaijani government. On 5 July, İctimai Television (İTV) became a full EBU member, and on 15 October, it was given permission to take part in the contest by the EBU. İTV has participated in the contest representing Azerbaijan since its 53rd edition in 2008. İTV had already broadcast the contest in previous years, purchasing broadcasting rights from the EBU.

== History ==
Azerbaijan's debut at Eurovision in 2008 proved to be successful, with "Day After Day" performed by Elnur and Samir placing 8th with 132 points. In 2009, Azerbaijan achieved an improvement on their 2008 debut, coming third and receiving 207 points with "Always" by Aysel and Arash.

Azerbaijan's first Eurovision win came in 2011, when "Running Scared" by Ell and Nikki triumphed. With their entry only receiving 5.26 points per voting country, Azerbaijan holds the record of the lowest average score for a winning song under that voting system (in place from 1975 to 2015).

The country managed another two consecutive top five results, with "When the Music Dies" by Sabina Babayeva finishing fourth with 150 points in 2012, and "Hold Me" by Farid Mammadov second with 234 in 2013, but in 2014, Azerbaijan failed to place in the top ten for the first time since their debut, finishing 22nd. Azerbaijan has since managed to reach top 10 only once, with "Truth" by Chingiz finishing eighth in 2019.

2018 saw Azerbaijan's first non-qualification, with "X My Heart" by Aisel failing to progress from the first semi-final. A streak of non-qualifications began in 2023, when "Tell Me More" by TuralTuranX failed to advance. The subsequent three Azerbaijani entries, "Özünlə apar" by Fahree and Ilkin Dovlatov in 2024, "Run with U" by Mamagama in 2025, and "Just Go" by Jiva in 2026, all also failed to qualify for the final, with "Just Go" recording the country's worst result to date.

== Popularity of the contest ==
Since Azerbaijan's debut in 2008, the contest has been extremely popular in the country. After placing in the top 10 at its debut in 2008 and also ending in the top 5 from 2009 to 2013, the contest became a matter of "national pride". The high importance of the contest within the country became evident in 2013, when the Azerbaijani president Ilham Aliyev launched an inquiry into his country failing to award Russia any points in the 2013 final. Since 2009, the contest has consistently been the most watched show on Azerbaijani television, despite the fact that the contest is broadcast at midnight local time due to the time difference from Central European Time. Azerbaijan issued a postage stamp dedicated to Ell and Nikki's win in 2011.

The country spent ₼300 million (€160 million) on hosting the 2012 contest, including building a completely new arena for the event. As of 2025, this is the largest amount of money ever spent by any host country on organising the contest.

== Participation overview ==
Table key
1	First place
2	Second place
3	Third place
◁	Last place
◇	Entry selected but did not compete
†	Upcoming event

Year	Artist	Song	Language	Final	Points	Semi	Points
2008	Elnur and Samir	"Day After Day"	English	8	132	6	96
2009	Aysel and Arash	"Always"	English	3	207	2	180
2010	Safura	"Drip Drop"	English	5	145	2	113
2011	Ell and Nikki	"Running Scared"	English	1	221	2	122
2012	Sabina Babayeva	"When the Music Dies"	English	4	150	Host country	
2013	Farid Mammadov	"Hold Me"	English	2	234	1	139
2014	Dilara Kazimova	"Start a Fire"	English	22	33	9	57
2015	Elnur	"Hour of the Wolf"	English	12	49	10	53
2016	Samra	"Miracle"	English	17	117	6	185
2017	Dihaj	"Skeletons"	English	14	120	8	150
2018	Aisel	"X My Heart"	English	Failed to qualify		11	94
2019	Chingiz	"Truth"	English	8	302	5	224
2020	Efendi ◇	"Cleopatra" ◇	English ◇	Contest cancelled (Note: The 2020 contest was cancelled due to the COVID-19 pandemic.)			
2021	Efendi	"Mata Hari"	English	20	65	8	138
2022	Nadir Rustamli	"Fade to Black"	English	16	106	10	96
2023	TuralTuranX	"Tell Me More"	English	Failed to qualify		14	4
2024	Fahree feat. Ilkin Dovlatov	"Özünlə apar"	English, Azerbaijani	Failed to qualify		14	11
2025	Mamagama	"Run with U"	English	Failed to qualify		15 ◁	7
2026	Jiva	"Just Go"	English, Azerbaijani	Failed to qualify		15 ◁	2
2027	Appeared on list of participants †						

== Hostings ==
Year	Location	Venue	Presenters	Image
2012	Baku	Baku Crystal Hall	Leyla Aliyeva, Eldar Gasimov and Nargiz Birk-Petersen	

== Awards received ==
=== Marcel Bezençon Awards ===
Year	Category	Song	Performer	Composer	Place	Points	Host city	Ref.
2012	Press Award	"When the Music Dies"	Sabina Babayeva	Anders Bagge, Sandra Bjurman, Stefan Örn, Johan Kronlund	4	150	(Azerbaijan) Baku	
2013	Artistic Award	"Hold Me"	Farid Mammadov	Dimitris Kontopoulos	2	234	(Sweden) Malmö	

== Related involvement ==
=== Heads of delegation ===
Each participating broadcaster in the Eurovision Song Contest assigns a head of delegation as the EBU's contact person and the leader of their delegation at the event. The delegation, whose size can greatly vary, includes a head of press, the performers, songwriters, composers, and backing vocalists, among others.

Year	Head of delegation	Ref.
2008–2011	Adil Karimli	
2012–2014, 2019	Husniyya Maharramova	
2015–2016	Tamilla Shirinova	
2018, 2020	Leyla Quliyeva	
2021–2022	Isa Melikov	
2023–2024	Vasif Mammadov	
2025-2026	Nurlana Jafarova	

=== Commentators and spokespersons ===
The contest is aired on İTV with notable commentators include Azer Suleymanli and Murad Arif.

Year	Commentator	Spokesperson	Ref.
2006	Unknown	Did not participate	
2007	Murad Arif and Leyla Aliyeva	Did not participate	
2008	Husniyya Maharramova and Isa Melikov	Leyla Aliyeva	
2009	Leyla Aliyeva and Isa Melikov	Husniyya Maharramova	
2010	Husniyya Maharramova	Tamilla Shirinova	
2011	Leyla Aliyeva	Safura Alizadeh	
2012	Konul Arifgizi and Saleh Bagirov	Safura Alizadeh	
2013	Konul Arifgizi	Tamilla Shirinova	
2014	Konul Arifgizi	Sabina Babayeva	
2015	Kamran Guliyev	Tural Asadov	
2016	Azer Suleymanli	Tural Asadov	
2017	Azer Suleymanli	Tural Asadov	
2018	Azer Suleymanli	Tural Asadov	
2019	Murad Arif	Faig Aghayev	
2021	Murad Arif and Husniyya Maharramova	Ell and Nikki	
2022	Murad Arif	None (Note: Narmin Salmanova was supposed to announce the results, but due to alleged technical difficulties, the contest's executive supervisor Martin Österdahl announced them instead.)	
2023	Azer Suleymanli	Narmin Salmanova	
2024	Nurlana Jafarova	Aysel Teymurzadeh	
2025	Elnara Khalilova and Aga Nadirov	Safura Alizadeh	
2026	Azer Suleymanli and Aysel Zahidgizi	Sabina Babayeva	

=== Stage directors ===
Year	Stage director(s)	Ref.
2011	Rennie Miro & Filip Adamo	
2013	Fokas Evangelinos	
2014	Åsa Engman and Nicoline Refsing	
2015	Ambra Succi	
2016	Roine Söderlundh	
2017	Naila Mammadzadeh	
2018	Fokas Evangelinos	
2019	Mads Enggaard, Konstantin Tomilchenko & Aleksandr Bratkovsky	
~~2020~~	~~Mads Enggaard~~	
2021	Mads Enggaard	
2023	Mads Enggaard	
2024	Yevhenii "Timó" Timokhin	

== Photo gallery ==
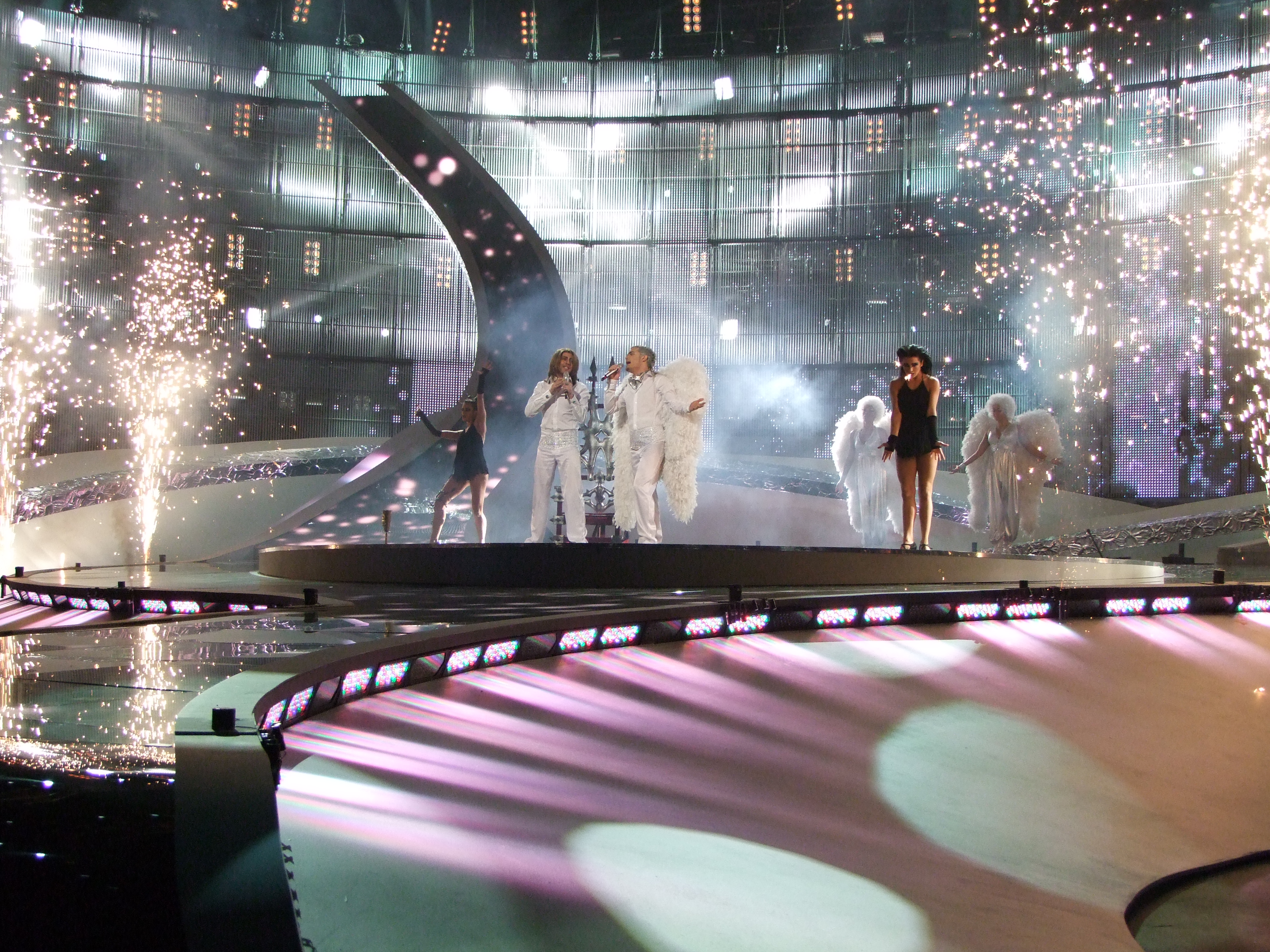
Elnur and Samir in Belgrade (2008)

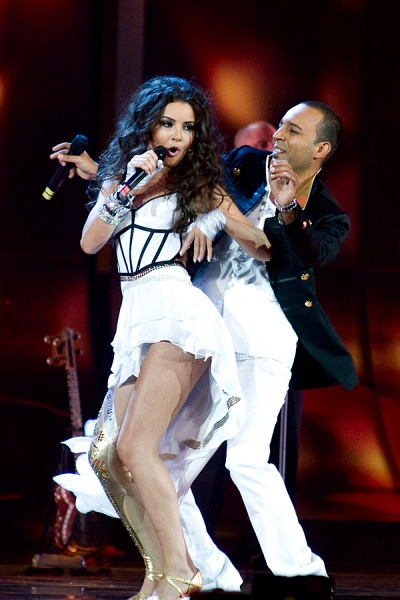
Aysel and Arash in Moscow (2009)

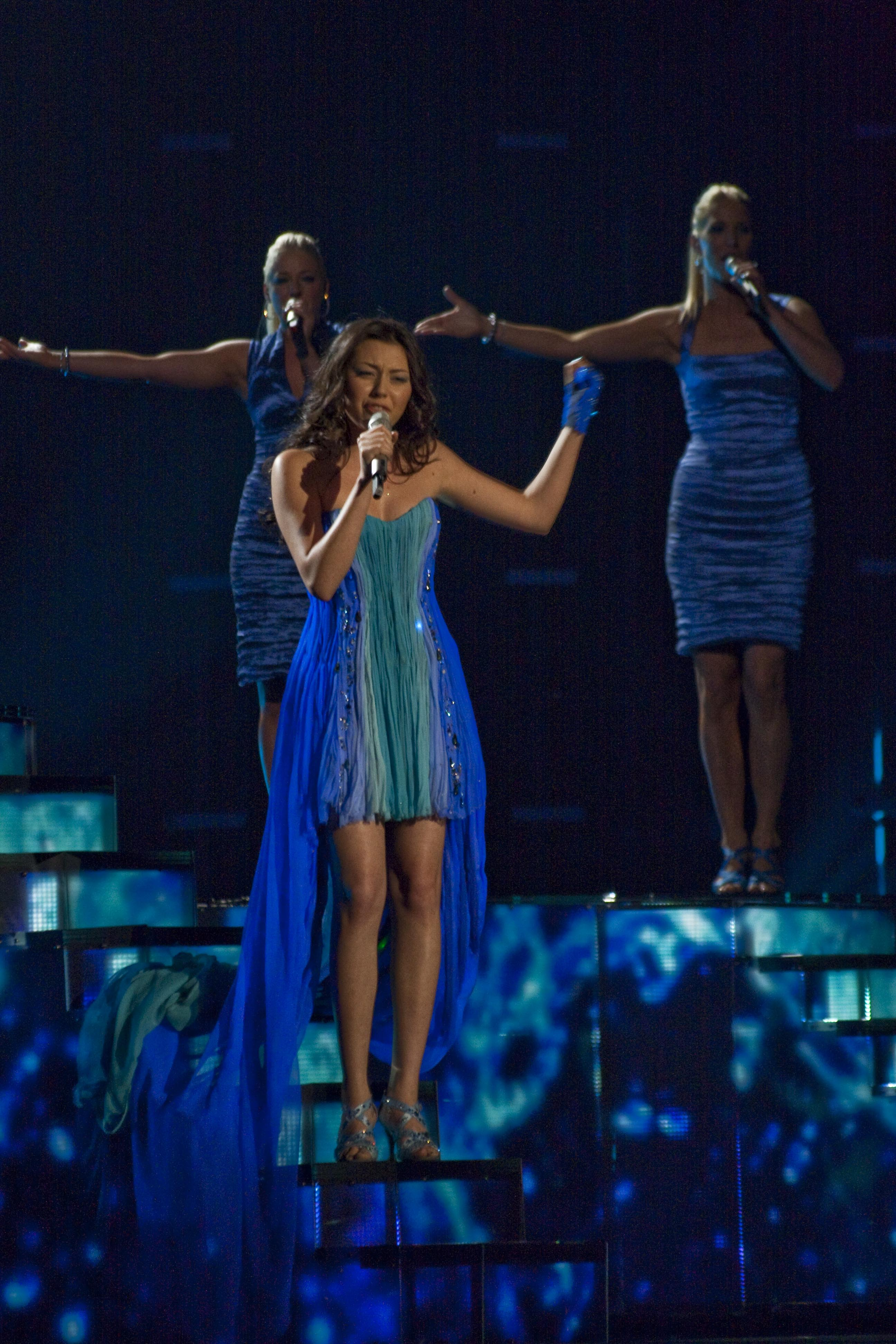
Safura Alizadeh in Oslo (2010)

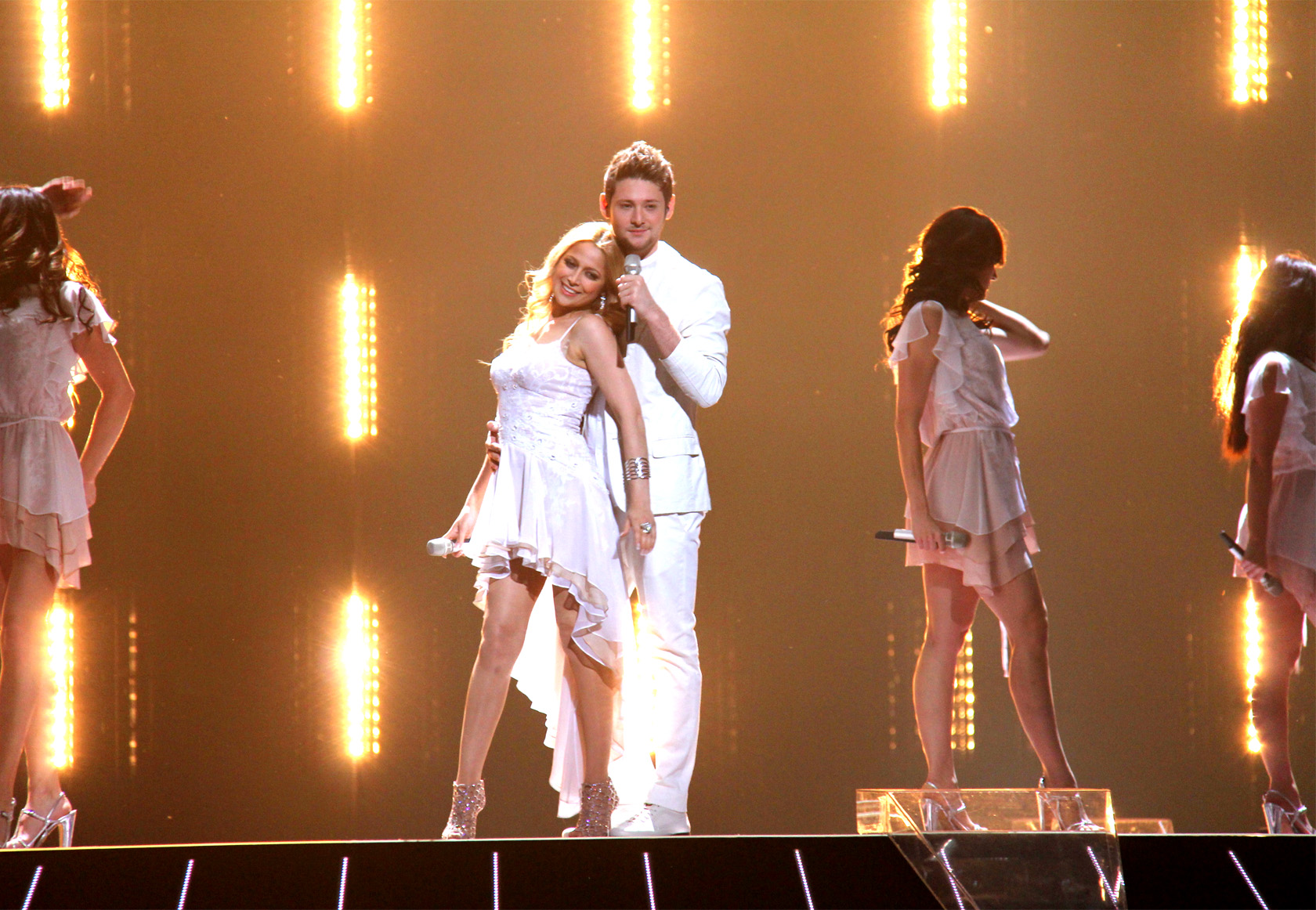
Ell and Nikki in Düsseldorf (2011)

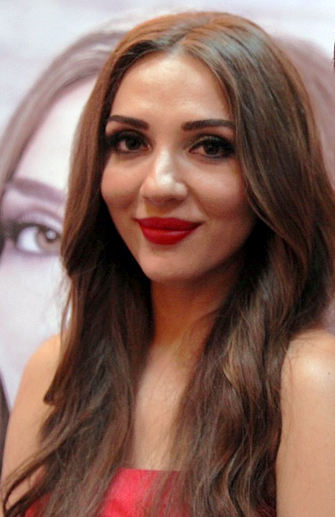
Sabina Babayeva on homesoil in Baku (2012)

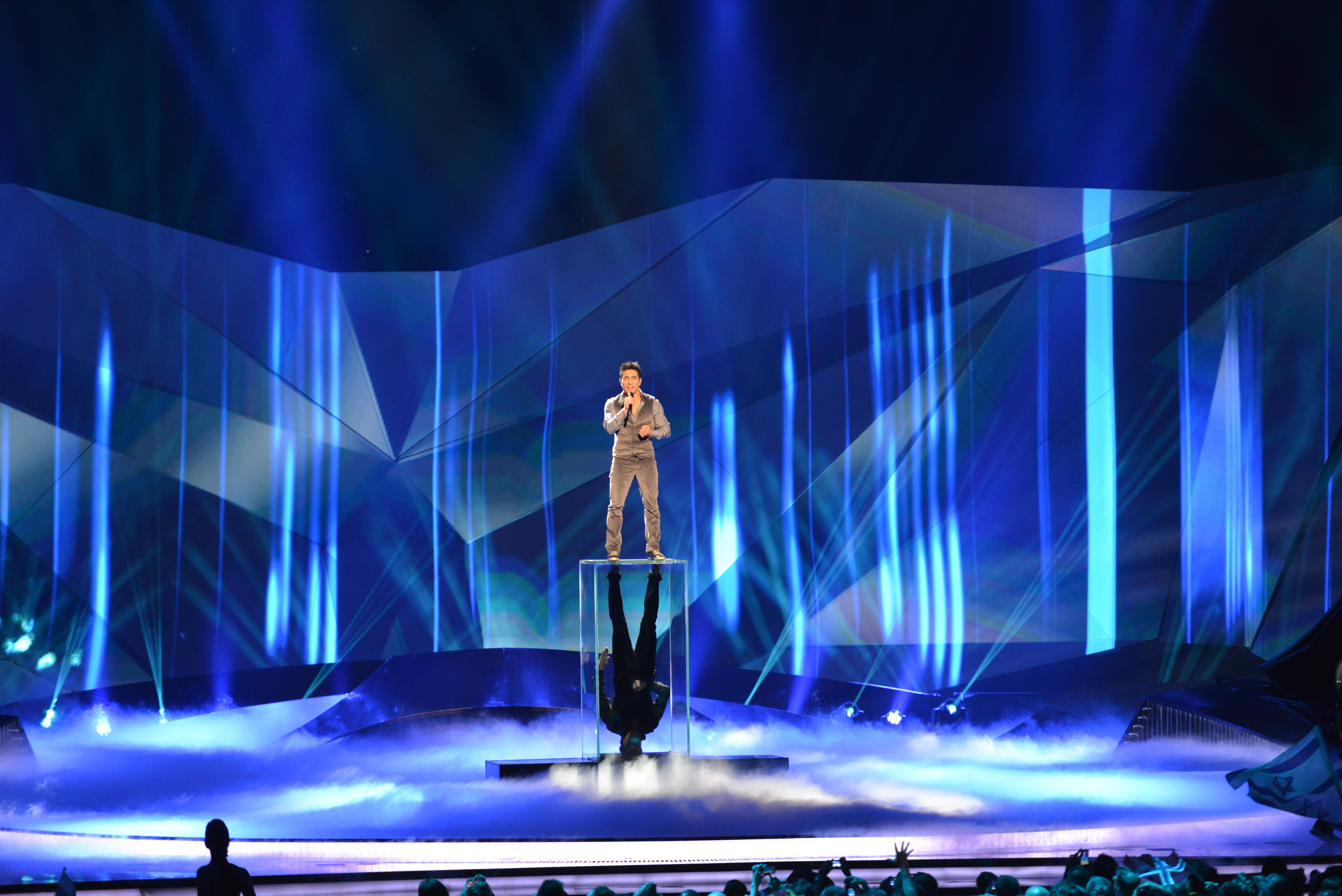
Farid Mammadov in Malmö (2013)

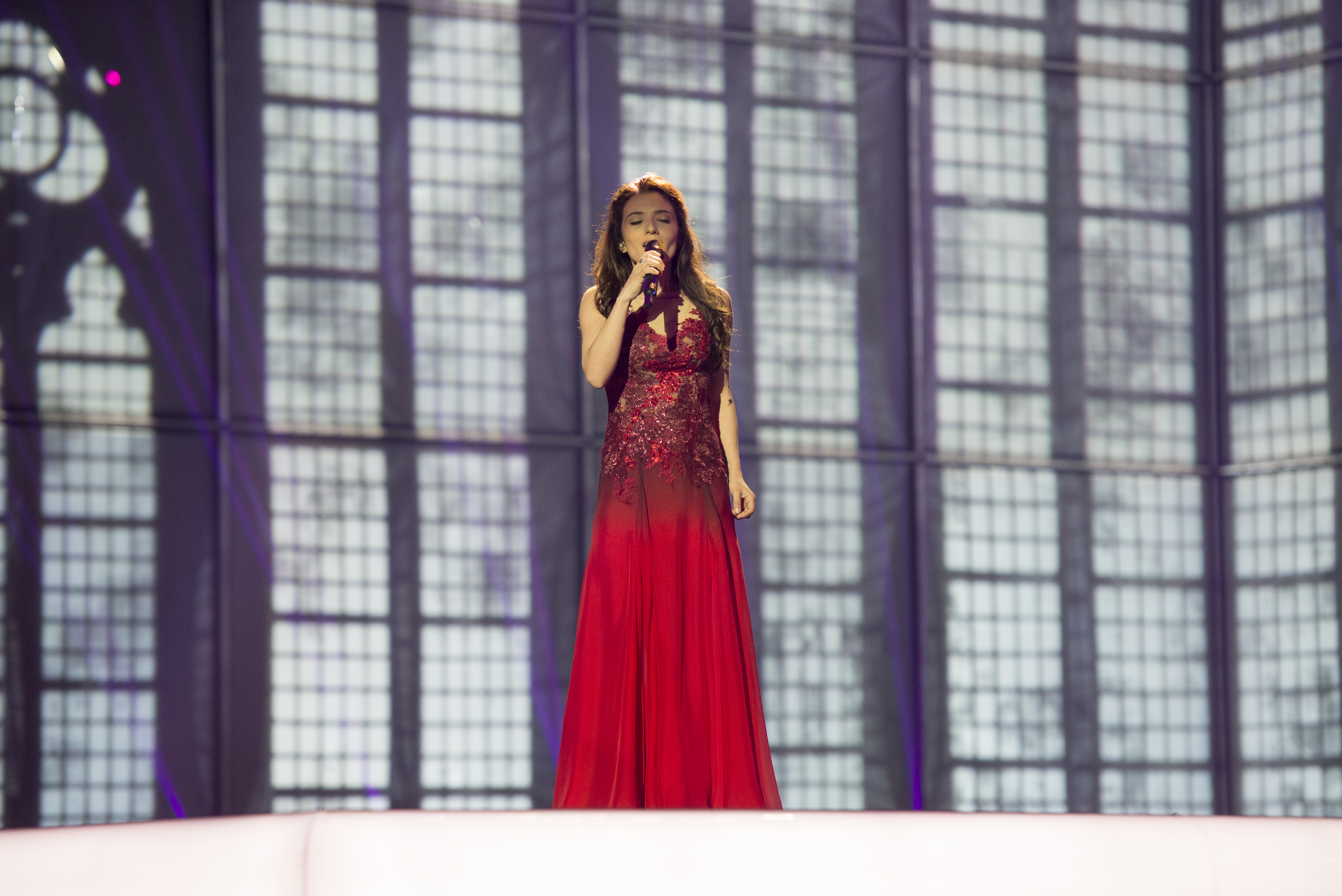
Dilara Kazimova in Copenhagen (2014)

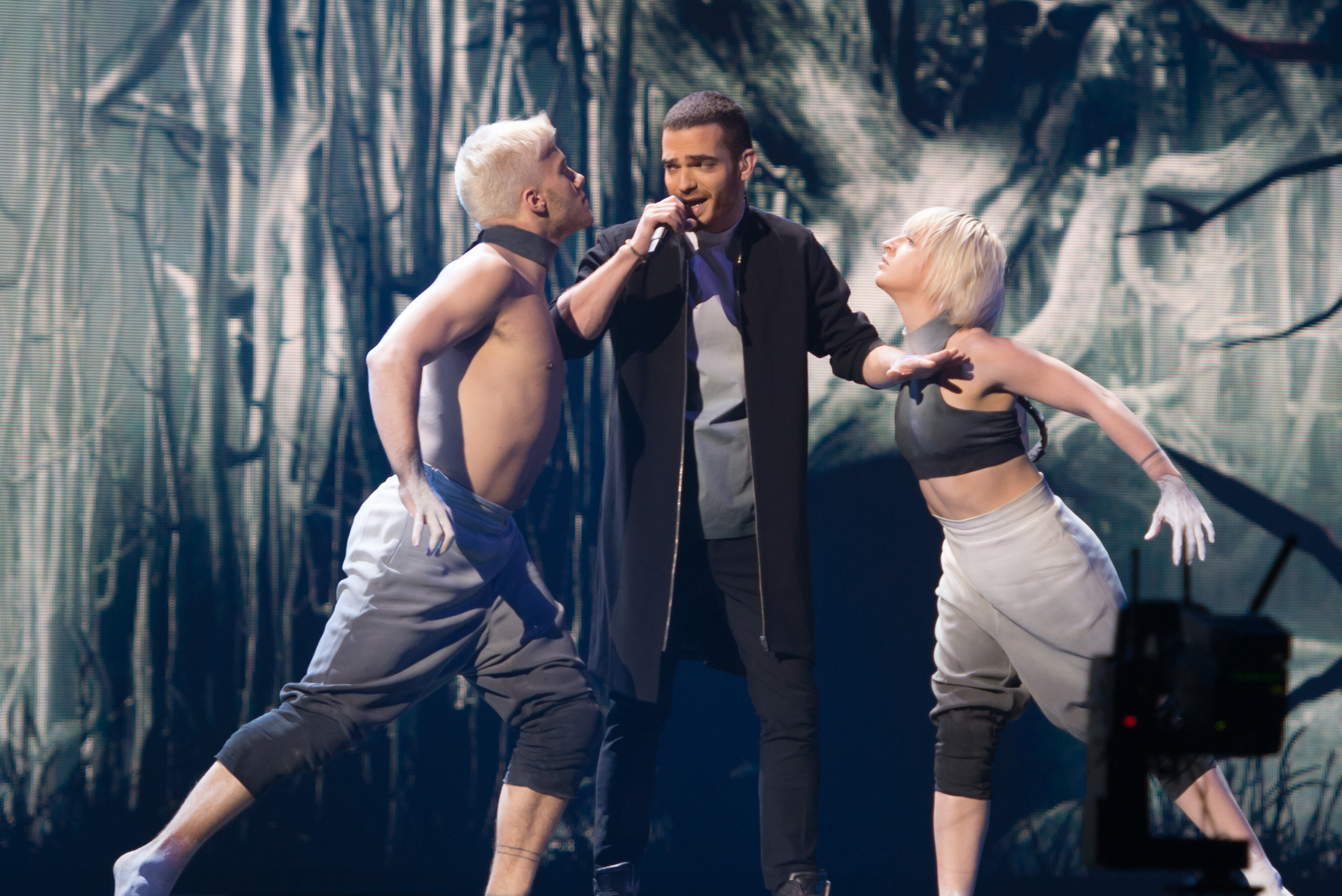
Elnur Hüseynov in Vienna (2015)

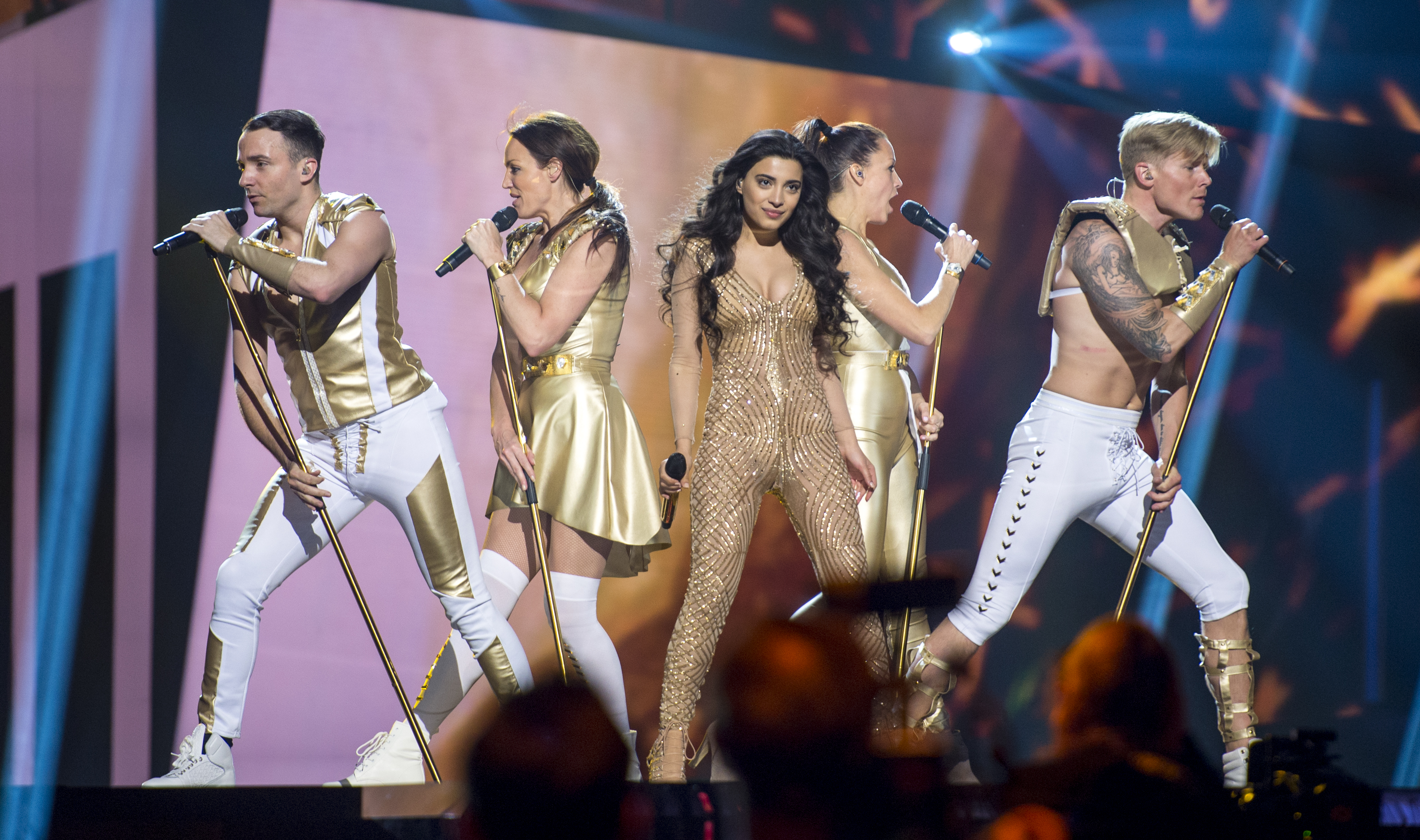
Samra Rahimli in Stockholm (2016)

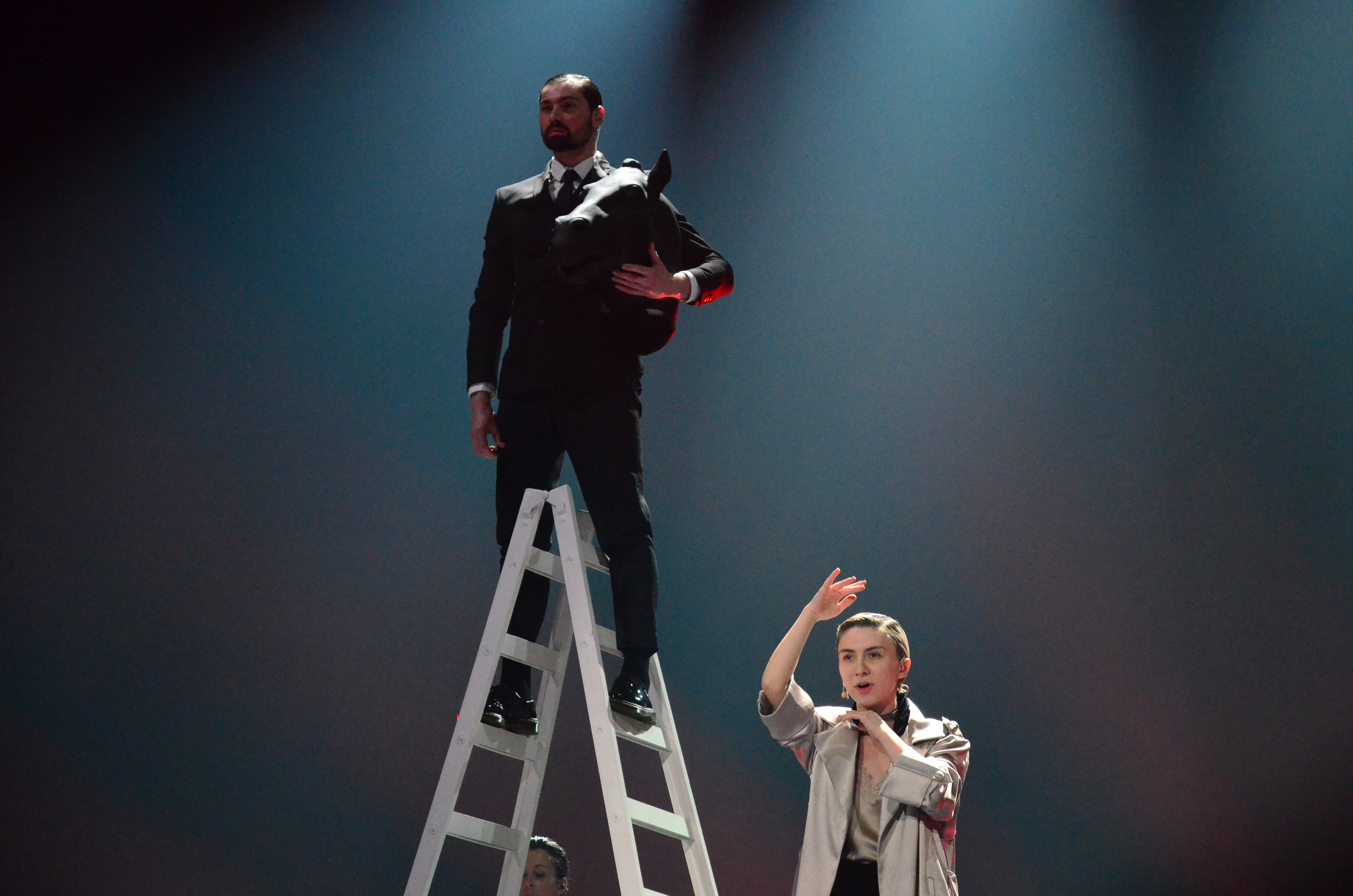
Diana Hajiyeva in Kyiv (2017)

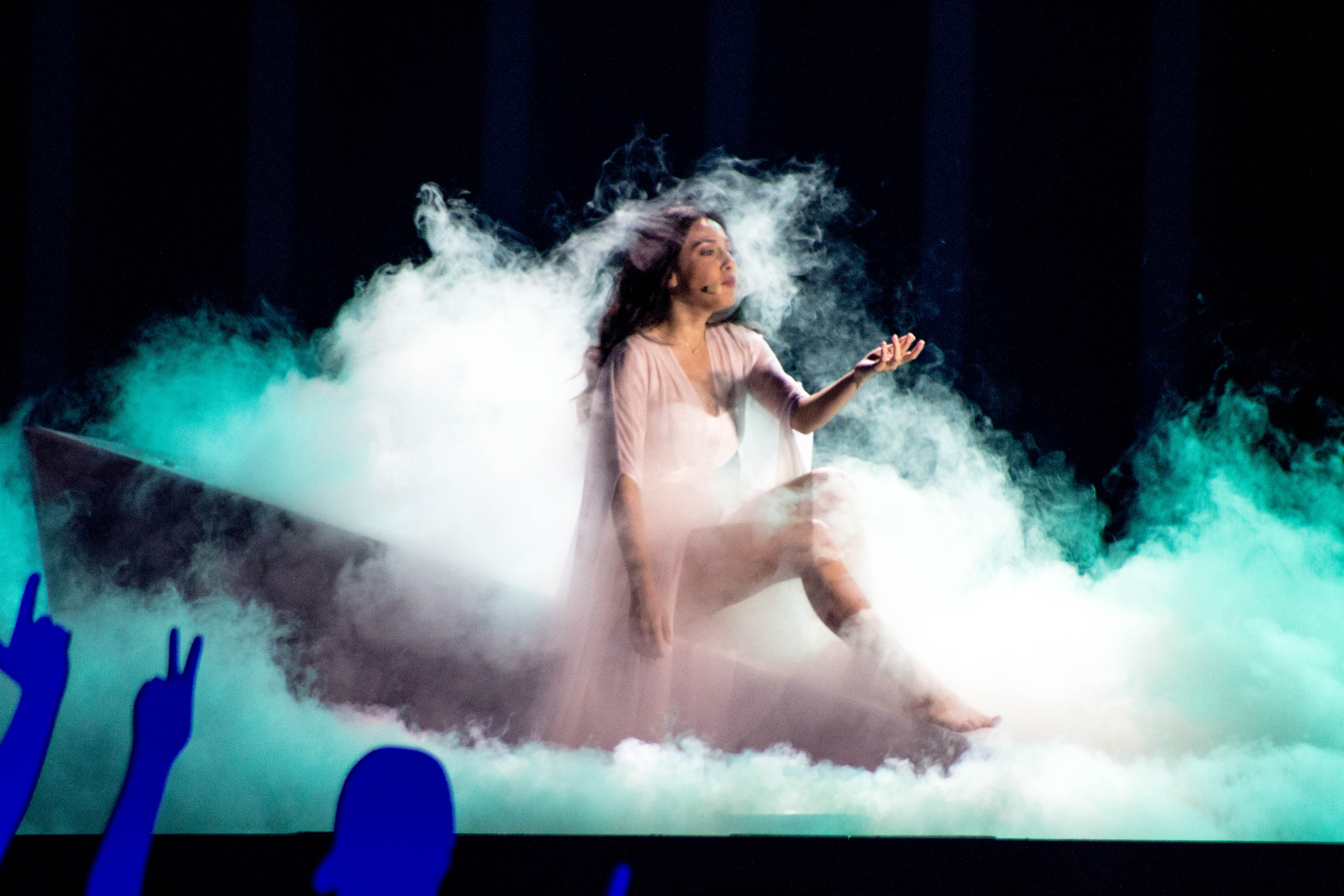
Aisel in Lisbon (2018)

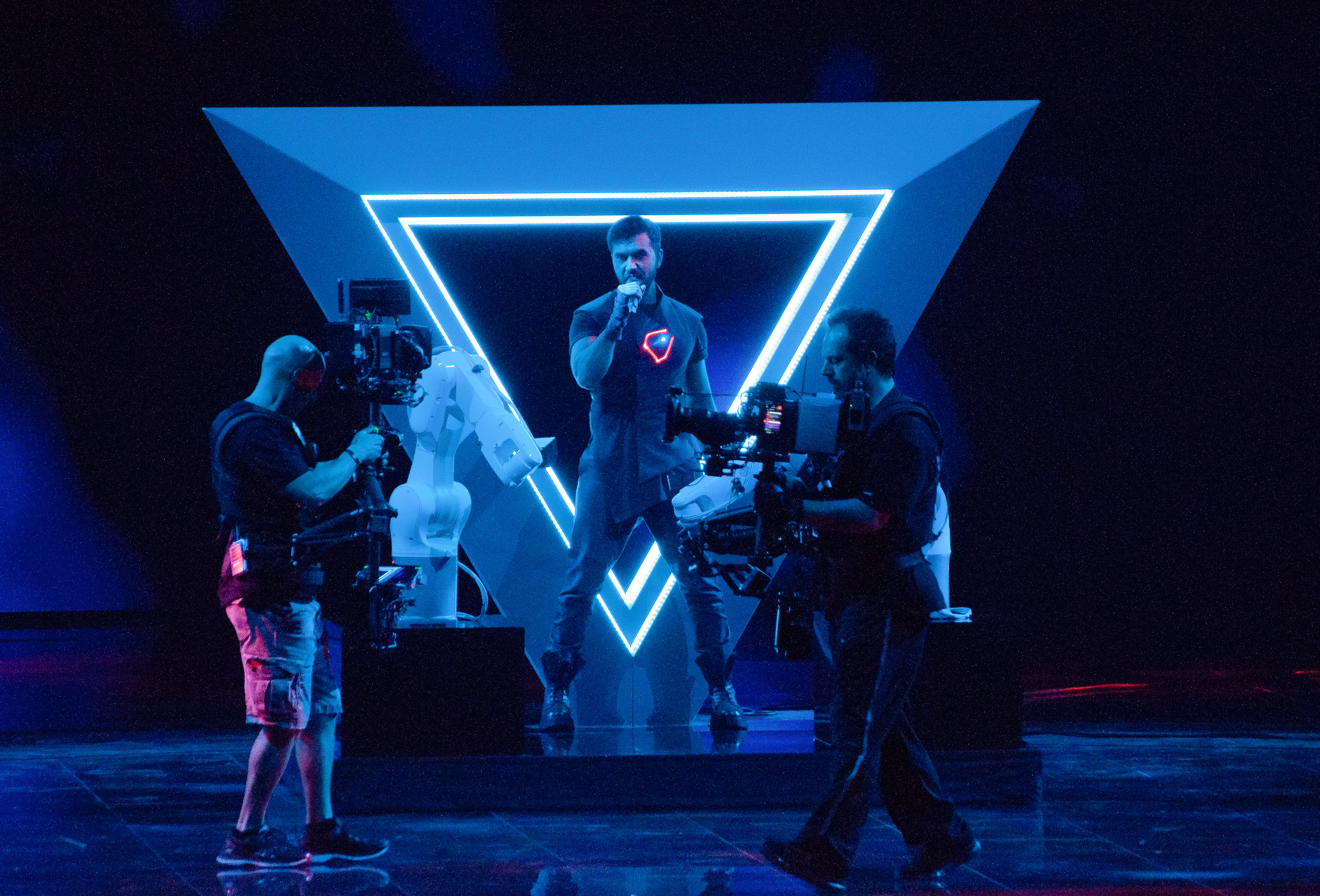
Chingiz in Tel Aviv (2019)

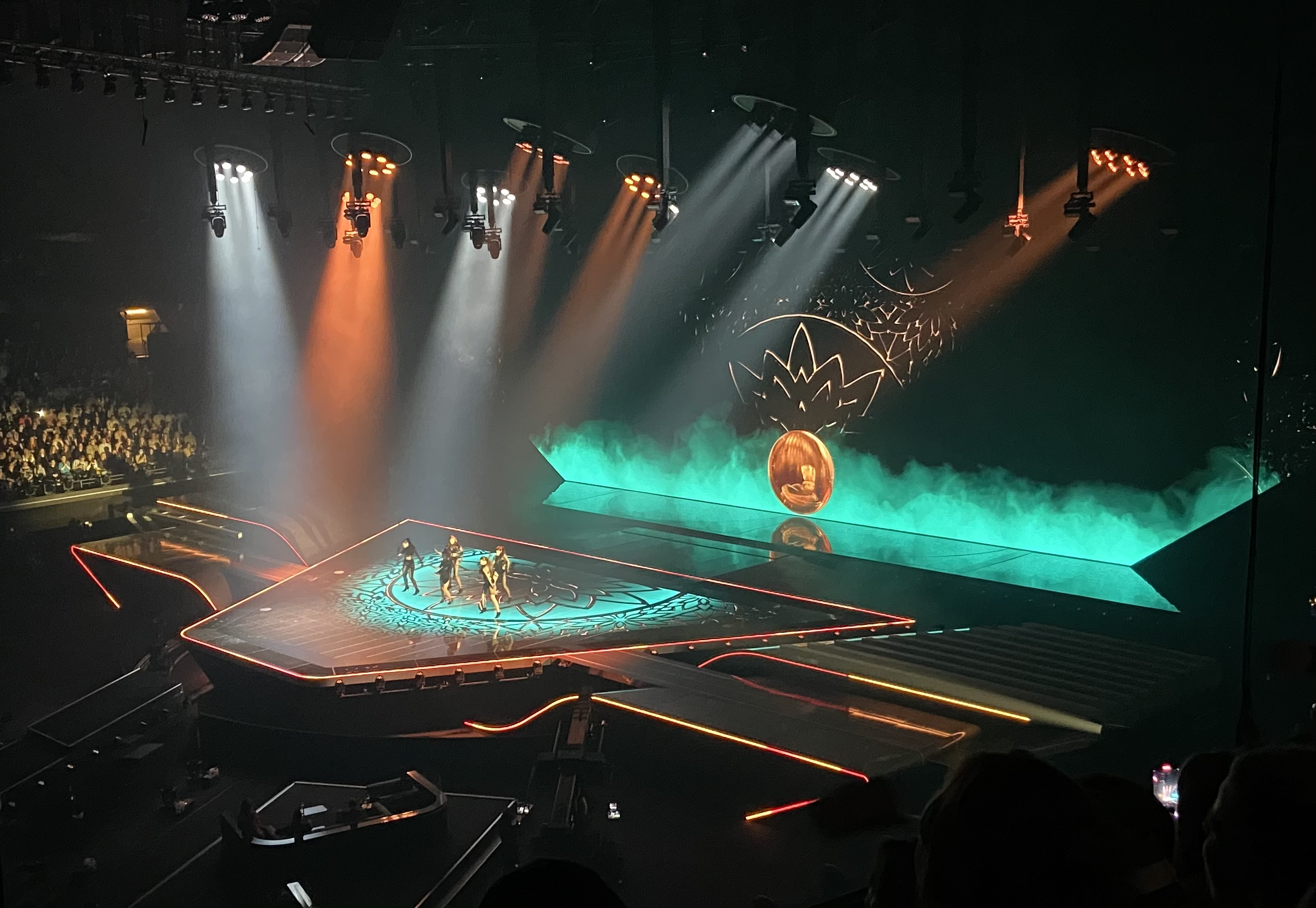
Efendi in Rotterdam (2021)

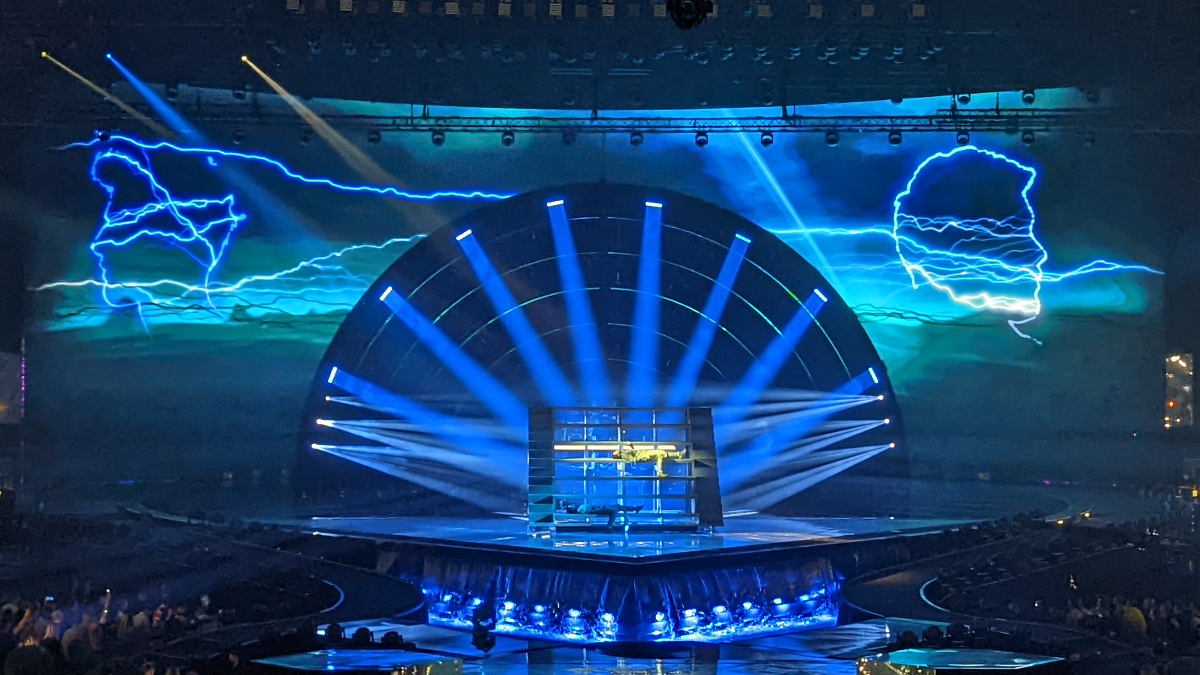
Nadir Rustamli in Turin (2022)

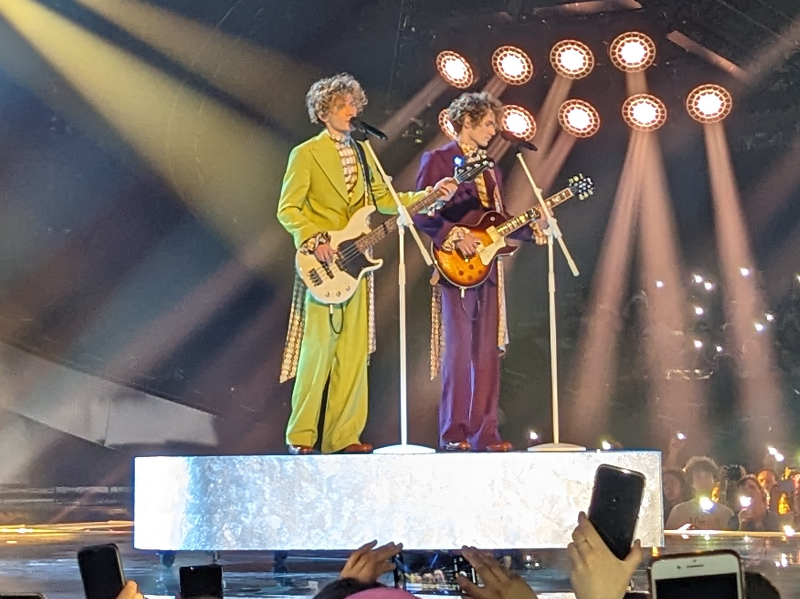
TuralTuranX in Liverpool (2023)

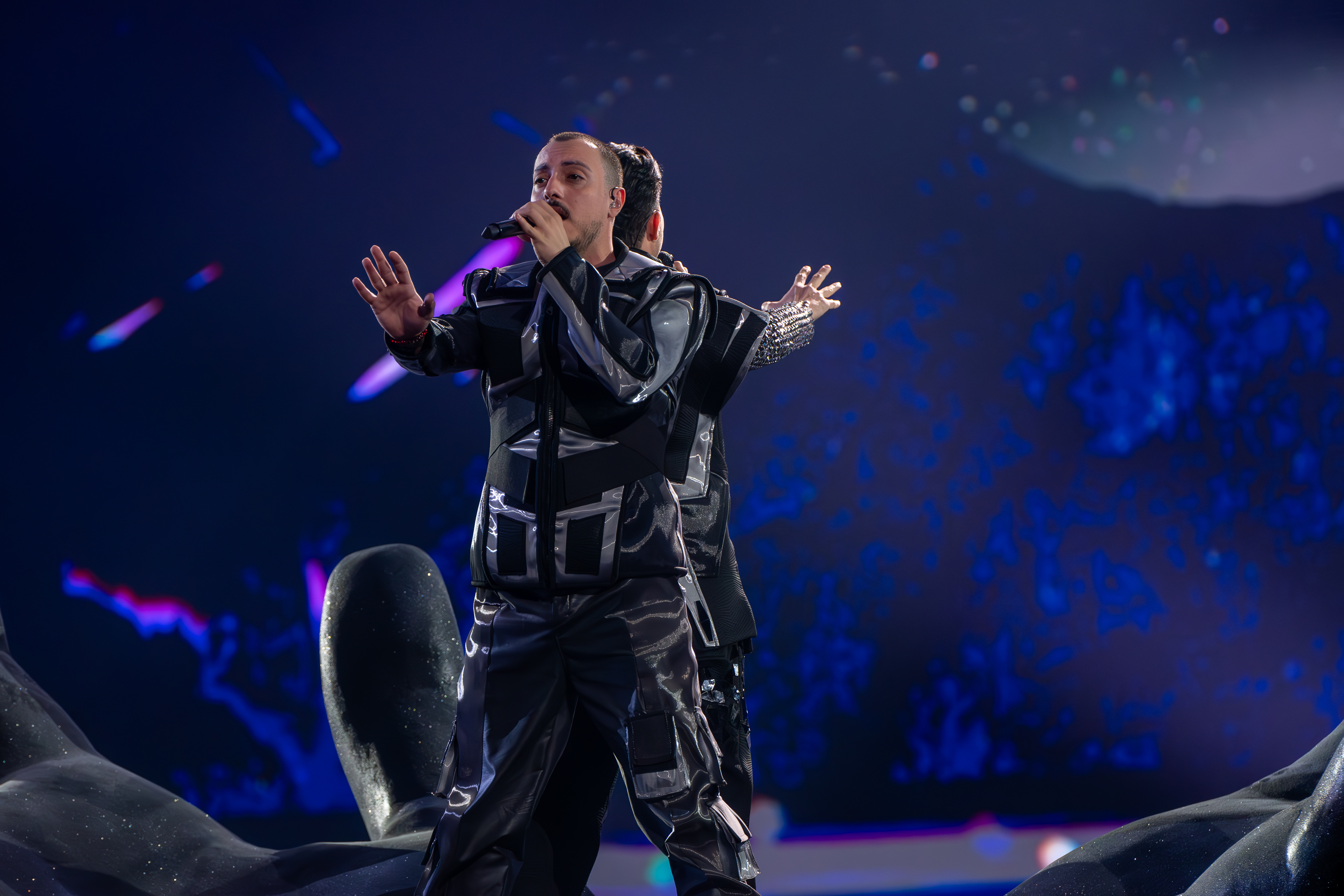
Fahree feat. Ilkin Dovlatov in Malmö (2024)

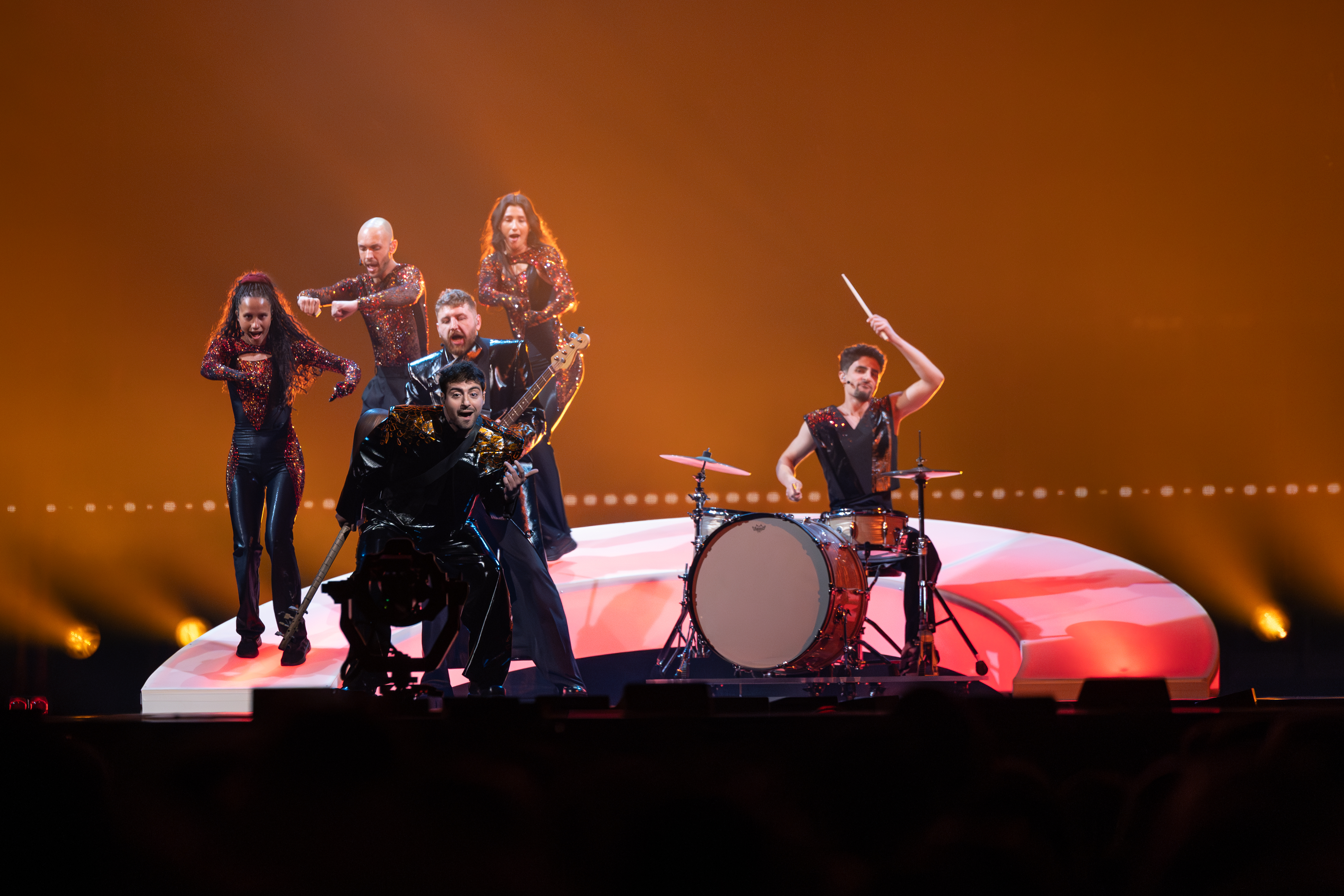
Mamagama in Basel (2025)

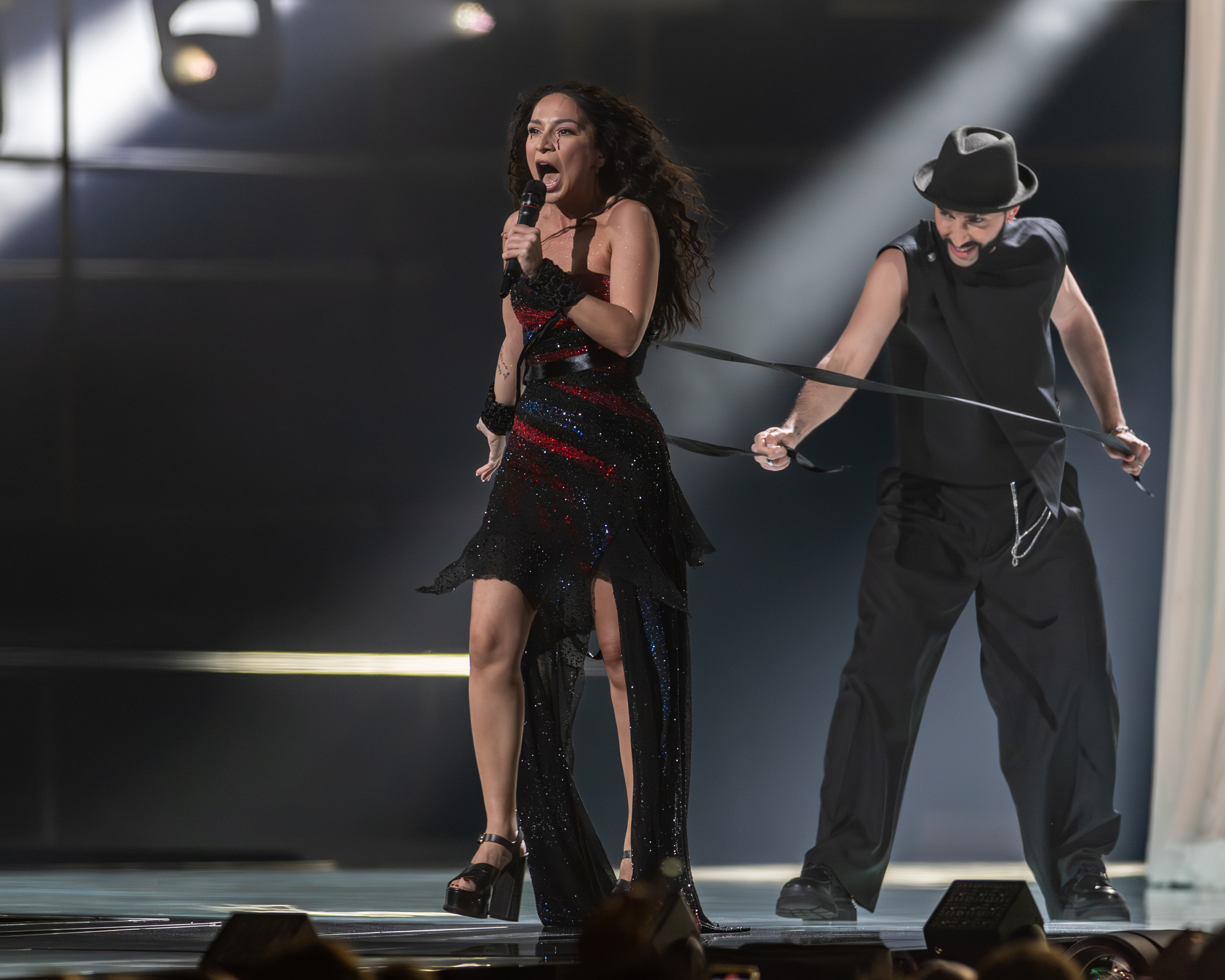
Jiva in Vienna (2026)

== See also ==
- Armenia–Azerbaijan relations in the Eurovision Song Contest – Relations between the two countries in the Junior and Senior Eurovision Song Contests.
- Azerbaijan in the Junior Eurovision Song Contest – Junior version of the Eurovision Song Contest.
