= Aynishan Quliyeva =

Azerbaijani singer (born 1990)

Aynishan Quliyeva (born 1990, Baku) is an Azerbaijani singer and the daughter of the famous Azeribaijani singer Aybeniz Hasimova. In 2010, she made it to the Azerbaijani national final for the chance to represent Azerbaijan in the Eurovision Song Contest 2011 in Germany. In her semifinal she received 25,000 votes, about 10,000 more votes than any of the other winners of the semifinals. Quliyeva did not win but placed amongst the five final acts in the final. In 2015 she participated in The Voice of Turkey.
