= Ilkin Dovlatov =

Azerbaijani singer (born 1990)

Ilkin Dovlatov İlkin Dövlətov
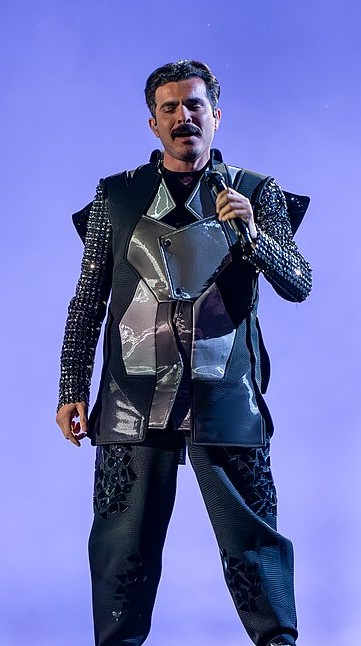
- Dovlatov in 2024

Background information
- Born: 16 June 1990 (age 35); Baku, Azerbaijani SSR, USSR
- Occupation: Singer
- Years active: 2023–present

Ilkin Dovlatov (Azerbaijani: İlkin Dövlətov, IPA: [ilˈcin dœy̯ˈlætow]; born 16 June 1990) is an Azerbaijani mugham singer. He rose to prominence after finishing second in The Voice of Azerbaijan (native songs version). Accompanying Fahree, he represented Azerbaijan in the Eurovision Song Contest 2024 with the song "Özünlə apar".

== Early life ==
Dovlatov was born in 1990 in Baku. He was raised in a musical family, his father being a major inspiration for him to start pursuing a musical career. At the age of four, Dovlatov performed his first song "Qəlbimdə qaldı". During his school years, a music teacher discovered Dovlatov's talent in singing and encouraged him to perform his music.

== Career ==
In 2023, Dovlatov competed in The Voice of Azerbaijan (native songs version). He was coached by Ilqar Khayal and finished as the contest's runner-up. Dovlatov has also participated in the Azəri Star song contest.

In late October 2023, İctimai Television (İTV) revealed a trio, consisting of Ilkin Dovlatov, Mila Miles and Etibar Asadli, as one of the sixteen shortlisted candidates in the 2024 Azerbaijani selection for the Eurovision Song Contest, and the next week, they were announced to be among the six acts who had moved on to the final stage. Their song was titled "İnsanlar". On 7 March 2024, Fahree was revealed as the selected candidate. However, on 13 March 2024, it was announced that Dovlatov would accompany Fahree on stage, performing the song "Özünlə apar". The duo failed to qualify from the first semi-final on 7 May 2024, placing 14th out of 15 with 11 points.

== Discography ==
=== Extended plays ===
Title	Details
Yaşa ürəyim	Released: 27 September 2024; Label: Self-released; Formats: Digital download, streaming

=== Live albums ===
Title	Details
Xatirələr	Released: 31 December 2025; Label: Self-released; Formats: Digital download, streaming

=== Singles ===
==== As lead artist ====
Title	Year	Album or EP
"Ters"	2023	Non-album singles
"Gecələr"	2023	Non-album singles
"İnsanlar" (with Mila Miles and Etibar Asadli)	2024	Non-album singles
"Azərbaycan" (with Fahree)	2024	Non-album singles
"Salam gətirmişəm"	2024	Non-album singles
"Getmə"	2024	Non-album singles
"Yandırdın qəlbimi" (with Nazpəri Dostəliyeva)	2024	Non-album singles
"Qonşular" (with Səbinə Ərəbli)	2024	Non-album singles
"Anama deyin"	2024	Non-album singles
"Unut məni"	2024	Non-album singles
"Ay saçı burma"	2024	Non-album singles
"Qal sənə qurban"	2024	Non-album singles
"Sevə bilmək" (with Nazpəri Dostəliyeva)	2025	Non-album singles
"Gecələr ayaz" (with Nigar Muharrem)	2025	Non-album singles
"Bayram edək"	2025	Non-album singles
"Qınama məni"	2025	Non-album singles
"Dünya"	2025	Non-album singles
"Ağrıkəsici" (with Fahree)	2025	Non-album singles
"Aman aman"	2025	Non-album singles
"Apar yanına"	2025	Non-album singles
"Sevməyir"	2025	Non-album singles
"Bir cavan"	2026	Non-album singles

==== As featured artist ====
Title	Year	Album or EP
"Özünlə apar" (Fahree featuring Ilkin Dovlatov)	2024	Non-album singles
"Ağla" (Xanım İsmayılqızı featuring Ilkin Dovlatov and Leyla Rəhimova)	2024	Non-album singles
"Gəlməmiş" (Vüqar Camalzadə featuring Ilkin Dovlatov)	2024	Dövri-səda
"Gizlətmək çətin" (Aygün Səmədzadə featuring Ilkin Dovlatov and Zabitə Alıyeva)	2024	Non-album single
"Ay İşığında" (Mila Miles featuring Ilkin Dovlatov)	2025	Triada

=== Other appearances ===
Title	Year	Album or EP
"Zəngəzur" (with Mübariz Tağıyev, Tünzalə, Aybəniz Haşımova, Aşıq Samirə, and Ehtiram Hüseynov)	2025	Non-album single

Awards and achievements
Preceded by TuralTuranX with "Tell Me More"	Azerbaijan in the Eurovision Song Contest; 2024; With: Fahree	Succeeded by Mamagama with "Run with U"
