= Tell Me More (song) =

2023 single by TuralTuranX

Single by TuralTuranX
- Language: English
- Released: 13 March 2023
- Length: 2:59
- Label: Beat Music
- Songwriters: Nihad Aliyev; Tunar Taghiyev; Tural Bağmanov; Turan Bağmanov

TuralTuranX singles chronology
| "Tell Me More" (2023) | "Reasons to Get High" (2024) |

Music video
- "Tell Me More" on YouTube

Eurovision Song Contest 2023 entry
- Country: Azerbaijan
- Artist: TuralTuranX
- Language: English
- Composers: Nihad Aliyev; Tunar Taghiyev; Tural Bağmanov; Turan Bağmanov
- Lyricists: Tural Bağmanov; Turan Bağmanov

Finals performance
- Semi-final result: 14th
- Semi-final points: 4

Entry chronology
- ◄ "Fade to Black" (2022)
- "Özünlə apar" (2024) ►

Official performance video
- "Tell Me More" (First Semi-Final) on YouTube

"Tell Me More" is a song by Azerbaijani folk duo TuralTuranX, released on 13 March 2023. The song represented Azerbaijan in the Eurovision Song Contest 2023 after being internally selected by İctimai Television, the Azerbaijani national broadcaster for the Eurovision Song Contest. The song competed in the first semi-final, failing to qualify for the grand final in 14th place with 4 points.

== Background and composition ==
According to both members of the duo, the inspiration of the song took place in 2022. While taking a music lesson, Tural would write some music chords as part of an assignment. He would give the chords to his brother, Turan, who had recently broken up with his girlfriend. Turan would also state that the song was inspired by the surroundings of his hometown, Zaqatala.

The song is described as a "vintage soft-rock" song by Wiwibloggs writer Katie Wilson. In an analysis by Wilson, the song is about one yearning for better communication in a relationship. The singer starts to experience a growing sense of separation from their romantic interest, but is still holding out hope for a smooth resolution. At first, the singer is fearful to express himself, but as the song progresses, they gradually become more comfortable with doing so.

== Eurovision Song Contest ==
=== Internal selection ===
İctimai Television opened a song submission period from 8 to 31 December 2022 for interested composers to enter their songs. The submission period was later extended until 15 January 2023. After denial from İctimai Television that they had already selected their Eurovision artist from singer Rauf Kingsley that occurred on 1 February, the next day, the broadcaster would officially announce the shortlist of five artists that were left in the running to represent Azerbaijan. On 9 March, TuralTuranX were officially announced as the representatives for Azerbaijan in the Eurovision Song Contest 2023, with their song officially releasing on 13 March.

=== At Eurovision ===
According to Eurovision rules, all nations with the exceptions of the host country and the "Big Five" (France, Germany, Italy, Spain and the United Kingdom) are required to qualify from one of two semi-finals in order to compete for the final; the top ten countries from each semi-final progress to the final. The European Broadcasting Union (EBU) split up the competing countries into six different pots based on voting patterns from previous contests, with countries with favourable voting histories put into the same pot. On 31 January 2023, an allocation draw was held, which placed each country into one of the two semi-finals, and determined which half of the show they would perform in. Azerbaijan has been placed into the first semi-final, to be held on 9 May 2023, and has been scheduled to perform in the second half of the show.
