= Fahree =

Azerbaijani singer (born 1995)

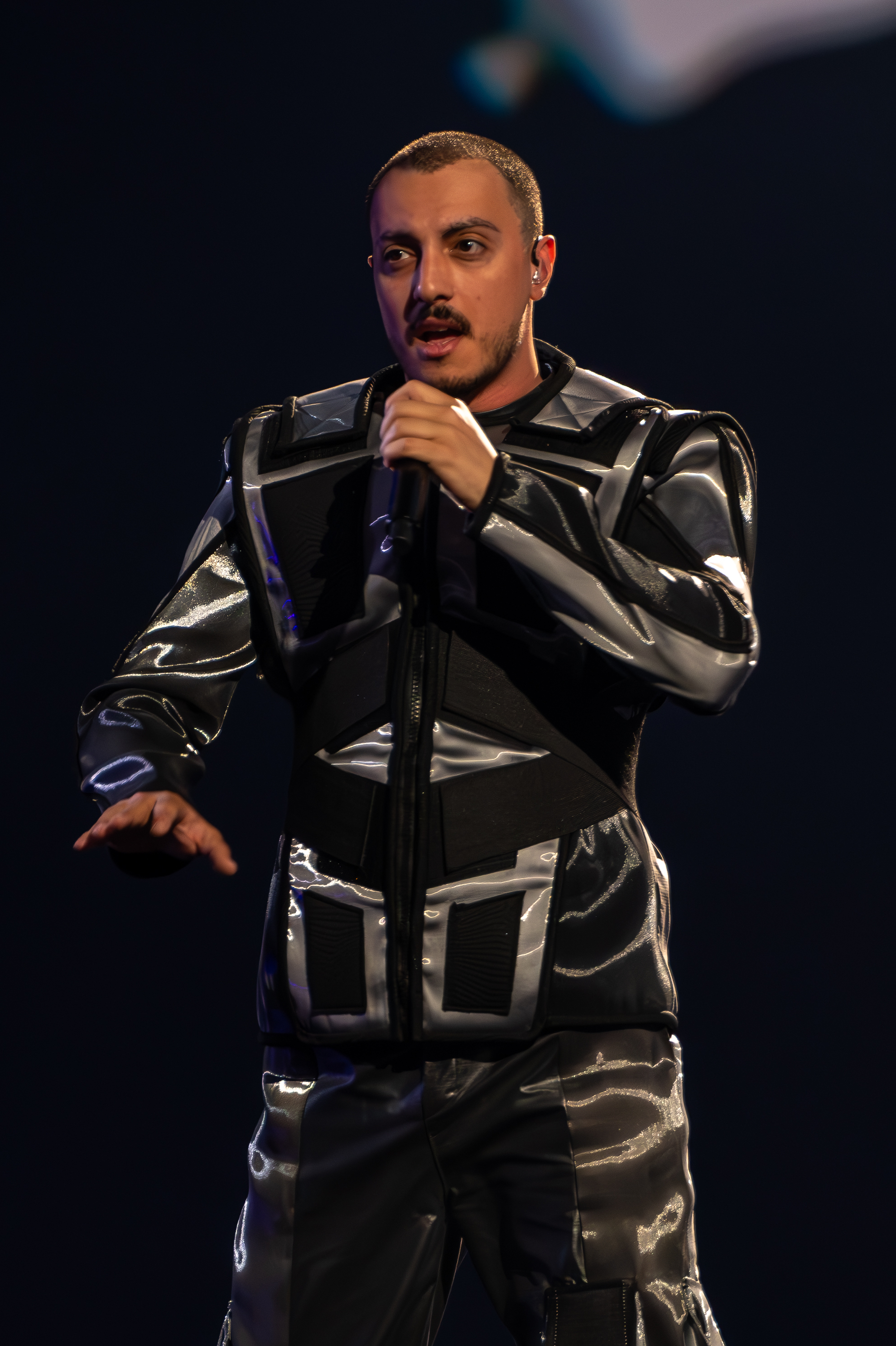
- Fahree in 2024

Background information
- Birth name: Fakhri Ismayilov
- Born: 10 April 1995 (age 30); Baku, Azerbaijan
- Years active: 2022–present
- Labels: Beat Music

Fakhri Ismayilov (Azerbaijani: Fəxri İsmayılov, pronounced [ˈfæxɾi ismɑˈjɯlow]; born 10 April 1995), known professionally as Fahree (stylized in all caps), is an Azerbaijani singer and songwriter. He represented Azerbaijan in the Eurovision Song Contest 2024 with the song "Özünlə apar", featuring Ilkin Dovlatov.

== Early life and education ==
Fahree was born in 1995 in Baku. He was raised in an artistic family, his father being a jazz drummer and his grandfather being an actor. He has both a Bachelor's and a Master's degree in law. At the height of the COVID-19 pandemic, he devoted himself more to music and pursued his childhood dream of becoming a musician.

== Career ==
In 2022, Fahree released his debut single, "Dance". He later went on to release two more singles.

In late October 2023, İctimai Television (İTV) revealed Fahree as one of the sixteen shortlisted candidates in the 2024 Azerbaijani selection for the Eurovision Song Contest, and the next week, he was announced to be among the six who had moved on to the final stage. On 7 March 2024, he was revealed as the selected candidate. He was accompanied on stage by Ilkin Dovlatov, one of the other finalists of the selection, performing the song "Özünlə apar". The duo failed to qualify from the first semi-final on 7 May 2024, placing 14th out of 15 with 11 points.

== Discography ==
=== Singles ===
Title	Year	Album or EP
"Dance"	2022	Non-album singles
"Apardı uzaqlara" (with Mila Miles)	2022	Non-album singles
"Yollar"	2023	Non-album singles
"Özünlə apar" (featuring Ilkin Dovlatov)	2024	Non-album singles
"Tərki-Dünya"	2024	Non-album singles
"Azərbaycan" (with Ilkin Dovlatov)	2024	Non-album singles
"Dön geriyə" (with Nurlana UnderCover)	2024	Non-album singles
"Ağrıkəsici" (with Ilkin Dovlatov)	2025	Non-album singles

Awards and achievements
Preceded by TuralTuranX with "Tell Me More"	Azerbaijan in the Eurovision Song Contest; 2024; With: Ilkin Dovlatov	Succeeded by Mamagama with "Run with U"
