= TuralTuranX =

Azerbaijani musical duo

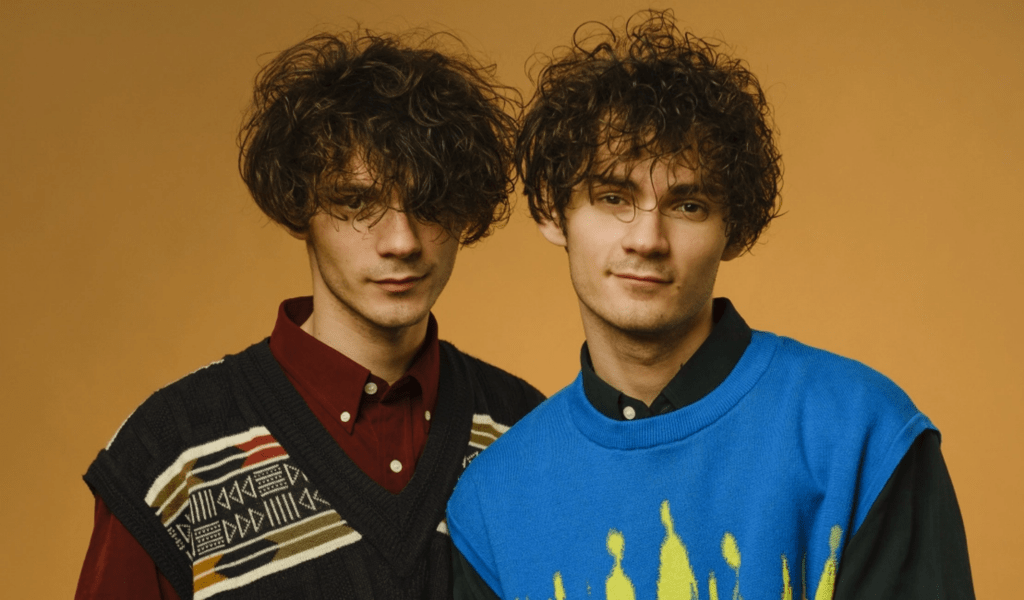
- TuralTuranX in 2023

Background information
- Born: Tural Bağmanov; Turan Bağmanov; 30 October 2000 (age 25); Zaqatala, Azerbaijan
- Origin: Baku
- Genres: Pop Electronic, Indie
- Label: BEAT Music
- Members: Tural Bağmanov; Turan Bağmanov

TuralTuranX is an Azerbaijani musical duo consisting of twin brothers Tural and Turan Bağmanov (born 30 October 2000). They represented Azerbaijan in the Eurovision Song Contest 2023 with their song "Tell Me More".

== History ==
Tural and Turan Bağmanov are from Zaqatala in northwestern Azerbaijan. They first saw a piano at school and were so fascinated by it that they often secretly practiced songs. Then their father bought them a used synthesizer. Later they also learned to play the guitar. TuralTuranX first appeared in schools and at some events. However, after the death of their father, they temporarily stopped making music.

Tural later moved to the capital Baku and founded the band TheRedJungle with a friend, with whom Turan also performed. The brothers also performed as street musicians.

On 2 February 2023, it was announced that TuralTuranX are among the last five candidates of Azerbaijan's internal selection for the Eurovision Song Contest 2023. On 9 March, they were selected as the Azerbaijani representatives for the Eurovision Song Contest. They competed in the first semi-final on 9 May with their song "Tell Me More", but failed to qualify for the grand final, finishing 14th out of 15, scoring 4 points.

== Personal lives ==
Tural and Turan Bağmanov had two other brothers named Emin and Jamal, both of whom died in a road accident in Yuxarı Tala in 2015.

== Discography ==
=== Singles ===
- "Tell Me More" (2023)
- "Reasons to Get High" (2024)
- "Amsterdam" (2025)

Awards and achievements
Preceded by Nadir Rustamli with "Fade to Black"	Azerbaijan in the Eurovision Song Contest; 2023	Succeeded by Fahree feat. Ilkin Dovlatov with "Özünlə apar"
