= Özünlə apar =

2024 song by Fahree

Single by Fahree featuring Ilkin Dovlatov
- English title: "Take Me with You"
- Released: 15 March 2024
- Genre: Mugham
- Length: 3:02
- Label: Beat Music
- Songwriters: Fahree; Edgar Ravin; Hasan Haydar; Mado Salikh; Mila Miles
- Producers: Hasan Haydar; Edgar Ravin

Fahree singles chronology
"Yollar" (2023)	"Özünlə apar" (2024)	"Tərki-Dünya" (2024)

Ilkin Dovlatov singles chronology
"Geceler" (2023)	"Özünlə apar" (2024)	"İnsanlar" (2024)

Music video
- "Özünlə apar" on YouTube

Eurovision Song Contest 2024 entry
- Country: Azerbaijan
- Artist: Fahree featuring Ilkin Dovlatov
- Languages: English, Azerbaijani
- Composers: Fakhri Ismayilov; Edgar Ravinov; Hasan Haydar; Tamila Rzayeva
- Lyricists: Fakhri Ismayilov; Madina Salikh

Finals performance
- Semi-final result: 14th
- Semi-final points: 11

Entry chronology
- ◄ "Tell Me More" (2023)
- "Run with U" (2025) ►

Official performance video
- "Özünlə apar" (First Semi-Final) on YouTube

"Özünlə apar" (Azerbaijani pronunciation: [œˈzynlæ ɑˈpɑɾ]; transl. "Take Me with You") is a song by Azerbaijani singer Fahree featuring Ilkin Dovlatov. It was written by Fahree and four other writers, and was released on 15 March 2024 by Beat Music. "Özünlə apar" represented Azerbaijan in the Eurovision Song Contest 2024.

== Background and composition ==
"Özünlə apar" was written by Fahree alongside Edgar Ravinov, Hasan Heydar, Mado Salikh and Mila Miles, and features traditional Azeri mugham vocals from Ilkin Dovlatov. The song is in English and Azerbaijani, making it the first Azerbaijani Eurovision entry to predominantly feature the Azerbaijani language. It has been described as an account of Fahree's "personal struggle and journey towards self-love and inner peace" in a Wiwibloggs analysis by Katie Wilson. Wilson, who stated that the song was dedicated to Fahree's girlfriend, wrote that when "the right person" comes out to hold his hand, his worries go away, showcasing love's power to free someone from emotional burdens.

On 7 March 2024, it was announced that Fahree would represent Azerbaijan in the Eurovision Song Contest 2024. The song was released on 15 March 2024 with a showcase performance uploaded to the official Eurovision Song Contest YouTube channel and was released on streaming services the following day.

== Music video and promotion ==
A music video to accompany "Özünlə apar", directed by Timó, was released onto YouTube on 27 April 2024. The video was filmed in the Azerbaijani municipality of Gobustan. To further promote the song, the duo released a remixed version of the song on the official Eurovision Song Contest YouTube channel on 17 April 2024.

== Critical reception ==
"Özünlə apar" has drawn mixed reception. Azerbaijani poet Aytan Ismikhanova made negative remarks about the song, criticizing it for being "meaningless" and a poor representation of mugham. In a Wiwibloggs review containing several statements from several critics, the song was rated 5.33 out of 10 points, earning 31st out of 37 songs on the site's annual ranking. The statements praised the cultural elements and vocals featured within the song, but was derided for a lack of uniqueness compared to other songs competing in Eurovision for that year. The same sentiment was shared by ESC Beat's Doron Lahav, who also ranked the song 31st. In contrast, Vulture's Jon O'Brien wrote a more favourable analysis of the song, proceeding to rank it tenth overall, calling it a "slow burner... its gorgeous sweeping strings and Dovlatov’s haunting melodies make this a far more intriguing proposition than the other competing ballads".

== Eurovision Song Contest ==
=== Internal selection ===
Azerbaijani broadcaster İctimai Television confirmed participation in Eurovision 2024 and opened their internal selection process to submissions on 14 July 2023, with the submission window lasting until 30 September. Live auditions for 15 artists, including Fahree, took part on 29 October 2023. Then on 6 November, İTV announced that a shortlist of 6 acts had been selected, which included Fahree, and also a separate trio featuring Ilkin Dovlatov as well as Mila Miles, who is one of the composers of "Özünlə apar". Despite initial reports that the trio and 2018 entrant Aisel were the final two acts in the running, it was eventually announced on 7 March that Fahree would be representing the country in Malmö.

=== At Eurovision ===
The Eurovision Song Contest 2024 took place at the Malmö Arena in Malmö, Sweden, and consisted of two semi-finals held on the respective dates of 7 and 9 May and the final on 11 May 2024. During the allocation draw on 30 January 2024, Azerbaijan was drawn to compete in the first semi-final, performing in the second half of the show. The duo were later drawn to perform 12th in the semi-final, after Moldova's Natalia Barbu and before Australia's Electric Fields.

For the Eurovision performance, Ukrainian stage designer Yevhenii Timokhin was placed in charge of its staging. The performance featured Fahree in an armoured black and silver outfit amongst blue and black lighting, with graphics in the background that were described as "monochrome" that displayed a figure emerging from a pool of water. Two statues of cupped hands later appeared in the second half of the performance, with Fahree singing between the figures. According to the duo, the performance was meant to be a "continuation" of the music video, with them stating that "you have to watch the clip to understand the [performance]". The duo failed to qualify for the grand final.

== Track listing ==
Digital download/streaming

1. "Özünlə apar" – 3:02

Digital download/streaming – OKtava version

1. "Özünlə apar" (OKtava Version) - 2:53

== Release history ==
Release history and formats for "Özünlə apar"
Country	Date	Format(s)	Version	Label	Ref.
Various	15 March 2024	Digital download; streaming	Single	Beat Music	
Various	10 May 2024	Digital download; streaming	OKtava version	Beat Music	
