= Aisel (singer) =

Azerbaijani singer (born 1989)

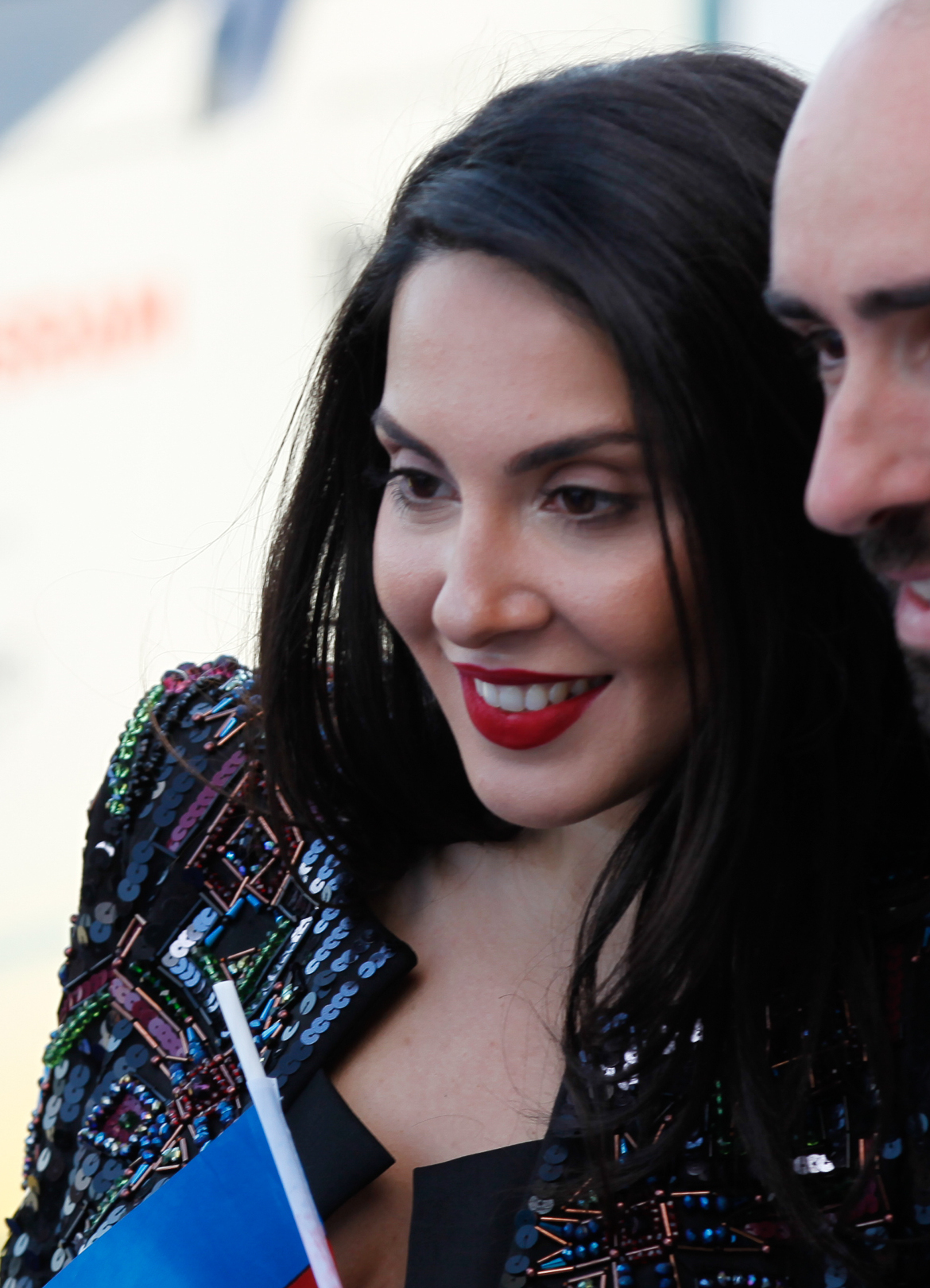
- Mammadova in 2018

Background information
- Born: Aysel Mammadova; 3 July 1989 (age 37); Baku, Azerbaijan SSR, USSR
- Genres: jazz; soul; electronic
- Occupation: Singer
- Instruments: Vocals; piano
- Labels: BEAT Music, SS MUSIC

Aysel Mammadova (Azerbaijani: Aysel Məmmədova; born 3 July 1989), known professionally as Aisel, is an Azerbaijani singer. She represented Azerbaijan in the Eurovision Song Contest 2018 with the song "X My Heart". She has also performed the Azerbaijan national anthem at the opening of the Formula 1 Azerbaijan Grand Prix 2023.

== Early life ==
Mammadova attended the Special Secondary Musical School and the Azerbaijan State Conservatory.

== Career ==
Mammadova participated in the Baku International Jazz Festival in 2005 and 2006, and the Montreux Jazz Festival in 2009. She is a member of the Baku Jazz Center.

=== Eurovision Song Contest ===
Mammadova was announced as the Azerbaijani artist for the Eurovision Song Contest 2018 on 8 November 2017. Her entry, "X My Heart", was released on 4 March 2018.

She performed first in the first semi-final on 8 May, placing 11th with 94 points, 14 points behind tenth-place Finland. She received 47 points from both the jury and the televote, receiving 12 points from the Greek jury. Her entry was the first Azerbaijani entry not to qualify for the final.

In regards to the song, Aisel stated: "I feel a strong connection with the lyrics of the song, since believing in myself made me overcome several difficulties I had in my life. This is a message I want to send to everyone: believing in yourself can make you stronger than cannonballs." However, two years later, she said that she regretted her performance with "X My Heart", and said that she had never actually connected with the song.

In late October 2023, Aisel was revealed as one of the sixteen shortlisted candidates in the 2024 Azerbaijani selection, and the next week, she was announced to be among the six who had moved on to the final stage. She ultimately was not selected.

== Discography ==
=== Studio albums ===
| Title | Details |
|---|---|
| On | Released: 3 March 2023; Label: Beat Music, SS Production; Formats: digital download, streaming |
| Subliminals | Released: 22 May 2026; Label: SS Music; Formats: digital download, streaming |

Awards and achievements
| Preceded by Dihaj with "Skeletons" | Azerbaijan in the Eurovision Song Contest; 2018 | Succeeded by Chingiz with "Truth" |
