= İctimai Television =

Azerbaijani public television channel

İctimai Televiziya
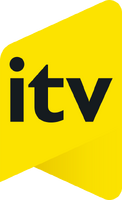
- Logo used since 2021
- Country: Azerbaijan
- Broadcast area: Azerbaijan
- Headquarters: Baku, Azerbaijan

Programming
- Language: Azerbaijani
- Picture format: 16:9 HDTV

Ownership
- Owner: Public Television and Radio Broadcasting Company (statutory corporation)

History
- Launched: 29 August 2005; 21 years ago

Links
- Website: itv.az

İctimai Television (İTV; Azerbaijani: İctimai Televiziya, lit. 'Public Television', pronounced: [id͡ʒtimɑˈi teleˈvizijɑ]) is a public television channel in Azerbaijan. After its legal creation in 2004, the station began broadcasting on 29 August 2005, making it the first independent public broadcaster in Azerbaijan. The channel is based in Baku.

== Organisation ==
İTV is primarily funded through advertising and government payments. The law of January 2004 creating the channel called for funding to come from a television licence fee beginning in January 2010, but this portion of the law has currently yet to be implemented as of October 2026.

The channel is operated by the Public Television and Radio Broadcasting Company (Azerbaijani: İctimai Televiziya və Radio Yayımları Şirkəti), which consists of a nine-member council whose members are approved by the President of Azerbaijan and a director general elected by the council and also approved by the President.

The company also operates the İctimai Radio public radio station, which commenced broadcasting on 10 January 2006. This arrangement, together with continued state financing, has been subject to criticism by non-governmental organizations because the channel may be too closely connected to the government to be fully independent and unbiased.

== Programming ==
İTV became a member of the European Broadcasting Union on 5 July 2007, allowing it to take part in events such as the Eurovision Song Contest, which it entered for the first time in 2008. Following Azerbaijan's win in the Eurovision Song Contest 2011, İTV hosted the competition of 2012 in Baku.

The broadcaster was also supposed to host the Third Eurovision Dance Contest in Baku in 2009, but this event was postponed and eventually cancelled due to the lack of participants. The channel was created with a vision to reflect the national and spiritual values, national customs and traditions, culture and art. It operates in accordance with the laws of Azerbaijan.

== Logo history ==
İctimai TV and Radio (logos)

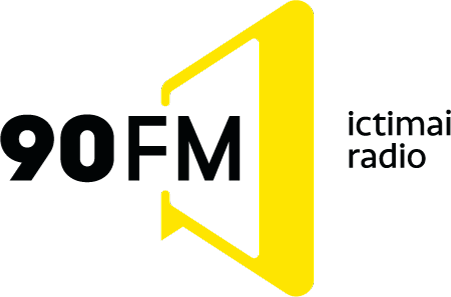
İctimai Radio (2019–2021)

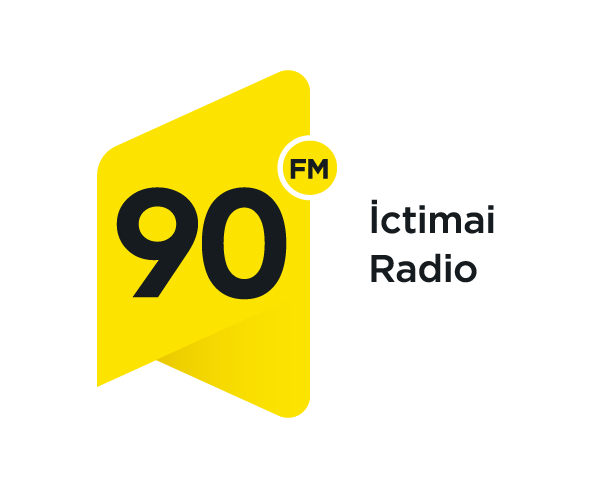
İctimai Radio (2021–present)
