= Azerbaijan in the Eurovision Song Contest 2014 =

- Eurovision Song Contest 2014
- Country: Azerbaijan
- Selection process: Artist: Böyük Səhnə; Song: Internal selection
- Selection date: Artist: 2 March 2014; Song: 16 March 2014

Competing entry
- Song: "Start a Fire"
- Artist: Dilara Kazimova
- Songwriters: Stefan Örn; Johan Kronlund; Alessandra Günthardt

Placement
- Semi-final result: Qualified (9th, 57 points)
- Final result: 22nd, 33 points

Participation chronology

Azerbaijan was represented at the Eurovision Song Contest 2014 with the song "Start a Fire" written by Stefan Örn, Johan Kronlund and Alessandra Günthardt. The song was performed by Dilara Kazimova. The Azerbaijani Eurovision entrant for the 2014 contest in Copenhagen, Denmark was selected through Böyük Səhnə, a talent show organised by the Azerbaijani broadcaster İctimai Television (İTV). Following three elimination shows and a final on 2 March 2014, a five-member jury selected Dilara Kazimova as the winner. The song "Start a Fire" was internally selected and presented to the public on 16 March.

Azerbaijan was drawn to compete in the first semi-final of the Eurovision Song Contest which took place on 6 May 2014. Performing during the show in position 8, "Start a Fire" was announced among the top 10 entries of the first semi-final and therefore qualified to compete in the final on 10 May. It was later revealed that Azerbaijan placed ninth out of the 16 participating countries in the semi-final with 57 points. In the final, Azerbaijan performed in position 3 and placed twenty-second out of the 26 participating countries, scoring 33 points. This marked the first time that Azerbaijan did not place in the top ten of the Eurovision Song Contest since its first entry in 2008.

== Background ==
Prior to the 2014 contest, Azerbaijan had participated in the Eurovision Song Contest six times since its first entry in 2008. Azerbaijan had won the contest on one occasion in 2011 with the song "Running Scared" performed by Ell and Nikki. Since their debut in 2008, Azerbaijan has had a string of successful results, qualifying to the final and placing in the top ten each year, including a third-place result in 2009 with the song "Always" performed by AySel and Arash and a second-place result in 2013 with the song "Hold Me" performed by Farid Mammadov.

The Azerbaijani national broadcaster, İctimai Television (İTV), broadcasts the event within Azerbaijan and organises the selection process for the nation's entry. İTV confirmed their intentions to participate at the 2014 Eurovision Song Contest on 4 September 2013. Azerbaijan had used various methods to select the Azerbaijani entry in the past, including internal selections as well as national finals to select both the artist and song. Between 2011 and 2013, Azerbaijan organized a national final titled Milli Seçim Turu to select the performer, song or both for Eurovision. For their 2014 entry, the broadcaster opted to utilise an existing talent show format titled Böyük Səhnə, which would result in the selection of a winning performer that would subsequently be given an internally selected song to perform at the contest. The competition was initially developed in 2013 by Azerbaijan's Ministry of Youth and Sports and the Ukrainian production company Euromedia and aired as a talent casting on Azad Azerbaijan TV until it moved to İTV for its second season for the purpose of selecting their 2014 entry.

== Before Eurovision ==
=== Böyük Səhnə ===
Böyük Səhnə (Big Stage) a talent show organised by İTV that selected the Azerbaijani contestant for the Eurovision Song Contest 2014. The competition consisted of four shows that commenced on 9 February 2014 and concluded with a winning artist on 2 March 2014. All shows took place at the NTU studios in Kyiv, Ukraine, hosted by Husniyya Maharramova and Tural Asadov and broadcast on İTV as well as streamed online via the broadcaster's website itv.az.

==== Format ====
The national final consisted of two stages. The first stage was the supercasting which involved interested artists attending auditions. 80 artists were shortlisted, fourteen of them which were selected to advance to the second stage, the televised shows. An introductory show was broadcast on 2 February 2014 where the fourteen contestants were presented along with a recap. Four shows including three elimination shows between 9, 16 and 23 February 2014 selected the three contestants (who each performed cover versions of various songs) that would advance to the final on 2 March 2014. In the final, the winner was selected from the remaining three artists who each performed three songs.

The results of the elimination shows and the final were determined by the votes of a five-member jury panel whose members varied in composition in each show. During the elimination shows, each jury member assigned scores ranging from 1 (lowest score) to 10 (highest score) to each contestant and those receiving a total score of over 45 automatically advanced in the competition. The remaining contestants faced an additional jury deliberation which determined those that be eliminated from the competition. In the final, each jury member evaluated each contestant by assigning scores from 1 to 10 for all three performances and the contestant with the highest total score was selected as the Azerbaijani Eurovision contestant.

===== Supercasting =====
On 26 December 2013, İTV called for interested artists to submit their applications to the broadcaster by attend a casting round held in the following eight cities across Azerbaijan between 9 and 16 January 2014:

- 9 January 2014 – Sumqayit and Ganja
- 10 January 2014 – Lankaran and Yevlakh
- 11 January 2014 – Shirvan and Shaki
- 12–13 January 2014 – Quba and Baku
- 15–16 January 2014 – Baku

250 applicants attended the castings in front of a five-member jury panel consisting of Gulchohra Shafieva (film director), Sevda Alekbarzadeh (singer), Ilhama Gasimova (singer), Tunzala Gahraman (singer) and Saleh Bagirov (television presenter). Each jury member assigned scores ranging from 1 to 10 to each artist based on voice as well as dance and acting abilities, of which 80 were shortlisted after receiving a total score of over 40. Five shows covering the supercasting later aired between 27 and 31 January 2014, hosted by Husniya Maharramova. On 31 January 2014, the fourteen selected contestants were announced.

==== Shows ====
===== Elimination shows =====
The three elimination shows took place on 9, 16 and 23 February 2014 where the fourteen contestants performed cover versions of various songs. The contestants that received a total score of over 45 automatically advanced in the competition, while the jury eliminated four of the artists in the first two shows and three artists in the third show.

The members of the jury that voted during the elimination shows were: Eldar Gasimov (singer and winner of the Eurovision Song Contest 2011; first and second show), Tunzale Agayeva (singer and composer; first and second show), Zumrud Dadashzadeh (professor at the Baku Music Academy; first and second show), Mubariz Taghiyev (singer; first show), Murad Arif (songwriter and television host; first show), Sabina Babayeva (singer, 2012 Azerbaijani Eurovision entrant; second show), Faiq Suceddinov (singer; second show), Tunzala Gahraman (singer; third show), Zahra Badalbeyli (musician and poet; third show), Dimitris Kontopoulos (Greek composer; third show), Murad Dadashov (producer; third show) and Fuad Aliyev (director; third show).

Contestant automatically advanced Contestant advanced

Show 1 – 9 February 2014
R/O	Artist	Song (original artists)	E. Gasimov	M. Arif	T. Aghayeva	M. Taghiyev	Z. Dadashzade	Total	Result
1	Lala Sultan	"Aphrodisiac" (Eleftheria Eleftheriou)	7	7	8	8	7	37	—N/a
2	Aydin Eyvazzadeh	"Pumped Up Kicks" (Foster the People)	9	10	10	9	8	46	Advanced
3	Khulya Ibadova	"You Are So Beautiful" (Joe Cocker)	10	8	8	9	10	45	Advanced
4	Samira Efendiyeva	"All by Myself" (Eric Carmen)	8	8	10	9	8	43	Advanced
5	Elton Ibrahimov	"Superstition" (Stevie Wonder)	10	10	10	10	9	49	Advanced
6	Aishabeyim Naghiyeva	"Still Loving You" (Scorpions)	7	7	8	7	8	37	—N/a
7	Wave	"Sarı Gelin" (Azerbaijani folk song)	6	7	7	7	7	34	—N/a
8	Fuad Asadov	"Every Time (I See Your Smile)" (Tomas N'evergreen)	8	10	10	9	9	46	Advanced
9	Khana Hasanova	"Hero" (Mariah Carey)	9	8	8	9	10	44	Advanced
10	Erkin Osmanli	"Girls, Girls, Girls" (original song)	10	10	10	9	10	49	Advanced
11	Dilara Kazimova	"Mercy" (Duffy)	10	10	10	10	10	50	Advanced
12	Safa Eldar	"Troublemaker" (Olly Murs feat. Flo Rida)	7	7	7	8	7	36	—N/a
13	Valeria Huseynzadeh	"Glorious" (Cascada)	9	7	6	7	8	37	Advanced
14	Azad Shabanov	"Fall Again" (Glenn Lewis)	10	10	8	10	10	48	Advanced

Show 2 – 16 February 2014
R/O	Artist	Song (original artists)	S. Babayeva	F. Suceddinov	T. Aghayeva	Z. Dadashzade	E. Gasimov	Total	Result
1	Khulya Ibadova	"GoldenEye" (Tina Turner)	9	8	9	9	8	43	—N/a
2	Erkin Osmanli	"Lovelight" (Robbie Williams)	10	10	10	10	9	49	Advanced
3	Valeria Huseynzadeh	"Drip Drop" (Safura)	8	9	8	8	9	42	—N/a
4	Azad Shabanov	"Señorita" (Justin Timberlake)	10	10	9	10	10	49	Advanced
5	Samira Efendiyeva	"It's All About You" (Juliana Pasha)	10	10	10	9	9	48	Advanced
6	Aydin Eyvazzadeh	"Pompeii" (Bastille)	9	8	7	8	7	39	—N/a
7	Khana Hasanova	"Dance Again" (Jennifer Lopez feat. Pitbull)	9	10	8	9	10	46	Advanced
8	Fuad Asadov	"Sorry Seems to Be the Hardest Word" (Elton John)	9	8	7	8	7	39	—N/a
9	Dilara Kazimova	"History Repeating" (Propellerheads feat. Shirley Bassey)	9	9	10	10	10	48	Advanced
10	Elton Ibrahimov	"Creative" (Leon Jackson)	9	10	8	9	9	45	Advanced

Heat 3 – 23 February 2014
R/O	Artist	Song (original artists)	T. Gahraman	Z. Badalbeyli	D. Kontopoulos	M. Dadashov	F. Aliyev	Total	Result
1	Khana Hasanova	"At Last" (Etta James)	10	10	10	9	8	47	Advanced
2	Elton Ibrahimov	"Ready for Love" (India Arie)	9	8	8	7	7	39	—N/a
3	Samira Efendiyeva	"I Have Nothing" (Whitney Houston)	9	9	9	8	9	44	—N/a
4	Azad Shabanov	"Whatever Happens" (Michael Jackson)	9	9	9	8	10	45	—N/a
5	Dilara Kazimova	"Hometown Glory" (Adele)	10	10	10	10	9	49	Advanced
6	Erkin Osmanli	"If You Were a Sailboat" (Katie Melua)	9	9	9	8	9	44	Advanced

===== Final =====
The final aired on 2 March 2014 where the remaining three artists each performed three songs, including one of the songs performed during the elimination shows and an original song. The show was filmed on 28 February 2014. Dilara Kazimova was selected by the jury as the winner. The members of the jury were Eldar Gasimov (singer, winner of the Eurovision Song Contest 2011), Tunzala Agayeva (composer and singer), Murad Arif (songwriter and television host), Stefan Örn (Swedish composer) and Jamil Guliyev (General Director of İTV).

Final – 2 March 2014
R/O	Artist	Song (original artists)	E. Gasimov	T. Aghayeva	M. Arif	S. Örn	J. Guliyev	Total	Place
1	Erkin Osmanli	"Girls, Girls, Girls" (original song)	8	8	8	6	8	122	3
1	Erkin Osmanli	"Love Me Again" (John Newman)	9	10	8	8	9	122	3
1	Erkin Osmanli	"Letter to Brooke" (original song)	7	7	10	8	8	122	3
2	Dilara Kazimova	"History Repeating" (Propellerheads feat. Shirley Bassey)	8	8	9	7	8	136	1
2	Dilara Kazimova	"Happy" (Pharrell Williams)	9	9	10	9	9	136	1
2	Dilara Kazimova	"Alone" (original song)	10	10	10	10	10	136	1
3	Khana Hasanova	"Dance Again" (Jennifer Lopez feat. Pitbull)	9	9	7	7	9	129	2
3	Khana Hasanova	"Run" (Snow Patrol)	10	9	9	9	9	129	2
3	Khana Hasanova	"My Life" (original song)	9	9	8	8	8	129	2

=== Song selection ===
On 16 March 2014, İTV announced that Dilara Kazimova would be performing the song "Start a Fire". The selection of the song was based on the decision of İTV and a national jury panel. "Start a Fire" was written by Stefan Örn, Johan Kronlund and Alessandra Günthardt, and features the traditional Azeri musical instrument balaban (as shown in the official music video which was presented on the same day). In regards to the song, Kazimova stated: "'Start a Fire' is the best choice for me. The melody is kind of hypnotising and the story is deep and touching. It's a bit tragic but with hope. I'm very much into the song and want to make my audiences feel its deep meaning." Azerbaijani and Turkish versions of "Start a Fire", titled "Bir qığılcım" and "Alev Gibi", were later released respectively on 17 April and 1 May 2014.

=== Promotion ===
Dilara Kazimova made several appearances across Europe to specifically promote "Start a Fire" as the Azerbaijani Eurovision entry. On 5 April, Kazimova performed during the Eurovision in Concert event which was held at the Melkweg venue in Amsterdam, Netherlands and hosted by Cornald Maas and Sandra Reemer. On 13 April, Kazimova took part in promotional activities in Lithuania where she appeared and performed during the LRT programmes Labas rytas, Lietuva and Dvi žvaigždės as well as the TV3 show Chorų karai. On 17 April, Kazimova took part in promotional activities in Hungary by appearing during the MTVA programmes Ma Reggel and Kívánságkosár. On 20 April, Kazimova performed during the Russian Pre-Party event, which was organised by ESCKAZ and held at the Karlson restaurant in Moscow, Russia. On 22 April, Kazimova completed promotional activities in Georgia.

== At Eurovision ==
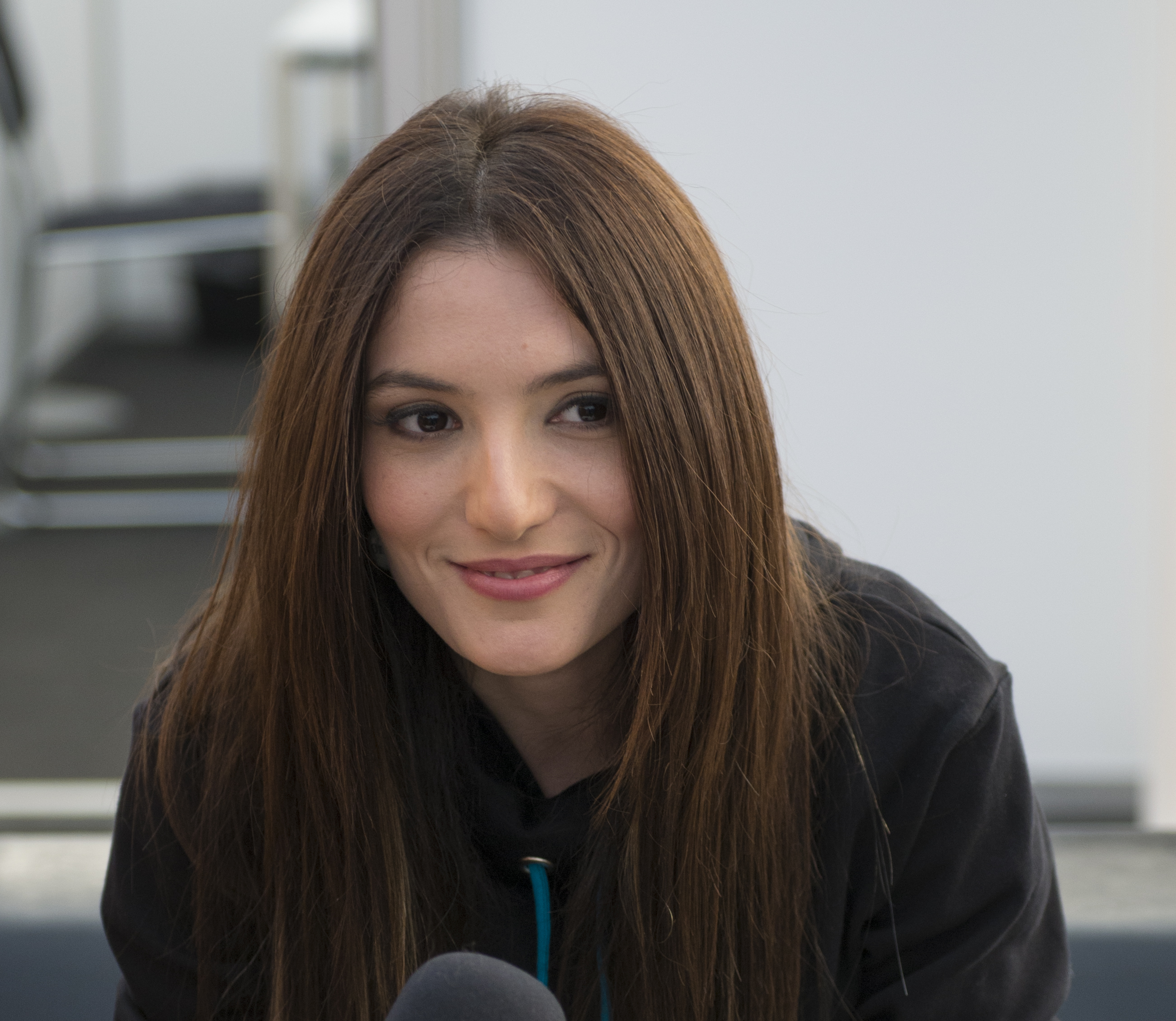
Dilara Kazimova during a press meet and greet

According to Eurovision rules, all nations with the exceptions of the host country and the "Big Five" (France, Germany, Italy, Spain and the United Kingdom) are required to qualify from one of two semi-finals in order to compete for the final; the top ten countries from each semi-final progress to the final. The European Broadcasting Union (EBU) split up the competing countries into six different pots based on voting patterns from previous contests, with countries with favourable voting histories put into the same pot. On 20 January 2014, a special allocation draw was held which placed each country into one of the two semi-finals, as well as which half of the show they would perform in. Azerbaijan was placed into the first semi-final, to be held on 6 May 2014, and was scheduled to perform in the first half of the show.

Once all the competing songs for the 2013 contest had been released, the running order for the semi-finals was decided by the shows' producers rather than through another draw, so that similar songs were not placed next to each other. Azerbaijan was set to perform in position 8, following the entry from Russia and before the entry from Ukraine.

The two semi-finals and final were broadcast in Azerbaijan on İTV and İTV Radio with commentary by Konul Arifgizi. The Azerbaijani spokesperson, who announced the Azerbaijani votes during the final, was 2012 Azerbaijani Eurovision representative Sabina Babayeva.

=== Semi-final ===
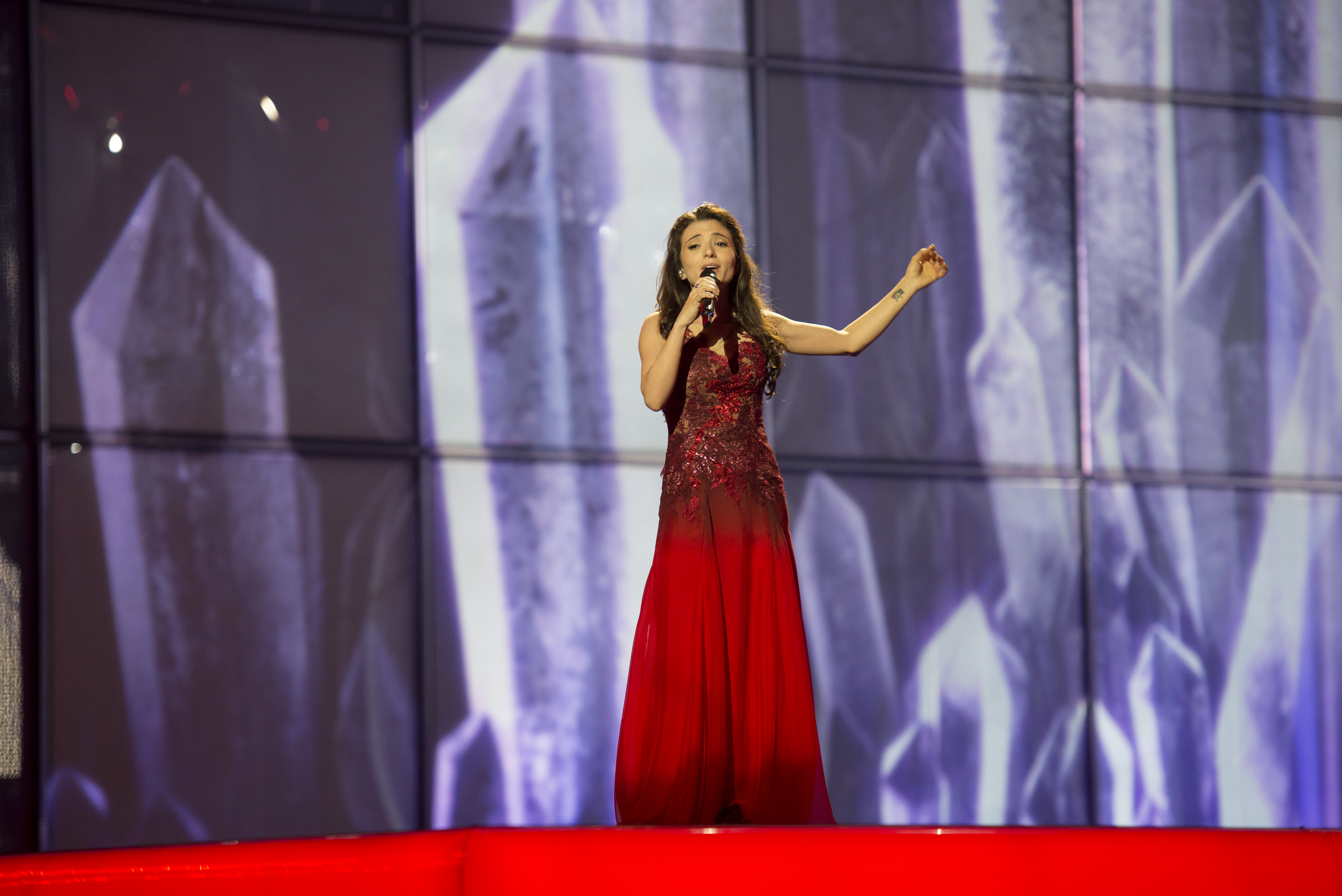
Dilara Kazimova during a rehearsal before the first semi-final

Dilara Kazimova took part in technical rehearsals on 28 April and 2 May, followed by dress rehearsals on 5 and 6 May. This included the jury show on 5 May where the professional juries of each country watched and voted on the competing entries.

The Azerbaijani performance featured Dilara Kazimova in a dark red dress performing with an aerial acrobat on an 8-meter-high acrobatic trapeze and three backing vocalists. The LED screens transitioned from a silhouette of giant stained-glass windows to a cityscape and ice crystals. The performance was directed by Asa Engman and Piotr Torazawa Giro, which based the idea of the aerial act as an imaginary "point of view" from which a new meaning in ordinary life scenes can be found, representing the spiritual concept of a soul. The aerial acrobat that joined Dilara Kazimova on stage was Matleena Laine, while the backing vocalists were Jennie Jahn, Sofia Lindström and Lena Engman.

At the end of the show, Azerbaijan was announced as having finished in the top 10 and subsequently qualifying for the grand final. It was later revealed that Azerbaijan placed ninth in the semi-final, receiving a total of 57 points.

=== Final ===
Shortly after the first semi-final, a winners' press conference was held for the ten qualifying countries. As part of this press conference, the qualifying artists took part in a draw to determine which half of the grand final they would subsequently participate in. This draw was done in the order the countries were announced during the semi-final. Azerbaijan was drawn to compete in the first half. Following this draw, the shows' producers decided upon the running order of the final, as they had done for the semi-finals. Azerbaijan was subsequently placed to perform in position 3, following the entry from Belarus and before the entry from Iceland.

Dilara Kazimova once again took part in dress rehearsals on 9 and 10 May before the final, including the jury final where the professional juries cast their final votes before the live show. Dilara Kazimova performed a repeat of her semi-final performance during the final on 10 May. Azerbaijan placed twenty-second in the final, scoring 33 points. This was the first time that Azerbaijan did not place in the top ten of the Eurovision Song Contest since its first entry in 2008.

=== Voting ===
Voting during the three shows consisted of 50 percent public televoting and 50 percent from a jury deliberation. The jury consisted of five music industry professionals who were citizens of the country they represent, with their names published before the contest to ensure transparency. This jury was asked to judge each contestant based on: vocal capacity; the stage performance; the song's composition and originality; and the overall impression by the act. In addition, no member of a national jury could be related in any way to any of the competing acts in such a way that they cannot vote impartially and independently. The individual rankings of each jury member were released shortly after the grand final.

Following the release of the full split voting by the EBU after the conclusion of the competition, it was revealed that Azerbaijan had placed twenty-second with the public televote and eighth with the jury vote in the final. In the public vote, Azerbaijan scored 26 points, while with the jury vote, Azerbaijan scored 108 points. In the first semi-final, Azerbaijan placed twelfth with the public televote with 41 points and fifth with the jury vote, scoring 94 points.

Below is a breakdown of points awarded to Azerbaijan and awarded by Azerbaijan in the first semi-final and grand final of the contest, and the breakdown of the jury voting and televoting conducted during the two shows:

==== Points awarded to Azerbaijan ====
Points awarded to Azerbaijan (Semi-final 1)
Score	Country
12 points	
10 points	Russia
8 points	
7 points	Albania; Montenegro
6 points	Moldova; San Marino
5 points	Ukraine
4 points	Estonia; Netherlands
3 points	
2 points	France; Latvia; Portugal
1 point	Hungary; Iceland

Points awarded to Azerbaijan (Final)
Score	Country
12 points	San Marino
10 points	Russia
8 points	
7 points	Georgia
6 points	
5 points	
4 points	
3 points	Belarus
2 points	
1 point	Ukraine

==== Points awarded by Azerbaijan ====
Points awarded by Azerbaijan (Semi-final 1)
Score	Country
12 points	Ukraine
10 points	Russia
8 points	Hungary
7 points	Latvia
6 points	San Marino
5 points	Estonia
4 points	Belgium
3 points	Netherlands
2 points	Montenegro
1 point	Portugal

Points awarded by Azerbaijan (Final)
Score	Country
12 points	Russia
10 points	Ukraine
8 points	Hungary
7 points	Belarus
6 points	Romania
5 points	Malta
4 points	Greece
3 points	San Marino
2 points	Poland
1 point	Austria

==== Detailed voting results ====
The following members comprised the Azerbaijani jury:

- Yegana Akhundova (jury chairperson) – pro-rector of Baku Music Academy, pianist, musician, composer
- Mubariz Taghiyev – People's Artist, musician, singer, actor
- Samir Djafarov – opera artist
- Nigar Jamal – singer, winner of the Eurovision Song Contest 2011
- Khayyam Mustafazadeh – singer, vocalist

Detailed voting results from Azerbaijan (Semi-final 1)
R/O	Country	Y. Axundova	M. Taghiyev	S. Djafarov	N. Jamal	K. Mustafazadeh	Jury Rank	Televote Rank	Combined Rank	Points
01	Armenia	15	15	15	15	15	15	15	15	
02	Latvia	5	6	1	4	5	4	9	4	7
03	Estonia	1	3	5	3	3	3	11	6	5
04	Sweden	12	14	12	14	14	14	8	13	
05	Iceland	13	12	14	11	13	13	12	14	
06	Albania	7	5	2	5	7	6	14	12	
07	Russia	2	1	4	1	2	1	2	2	10
08	Azerbaijan									
09	Ukraine	3	4	3	2	1	2	1	1	12
10	Belgium	8	11	7	10	8	9	6	7	4
11	Moldova	6	8	9	8	6	7	13	11	
12	San Marino	9	9	10	12	10	10	4	5	6
13	Portugal	14	13	13	9	11	12	7	10	1
14	Netherlands	11	10	8	13	12	11	5	8	3
15	Montenegro	10	7	11	6	9	8	10	9	2
16	Hungary	4	2	6	7	4	5	3	3	8

Detailed voting results from Azerbaijan (Final)
R/O	Country	Y. Axundova	M. Taghiyev	S. Djafarov	N. Jamal	K. Mustafazadeh	Jury Rank	Televote Rank	Combined Rank	Points
01	Ukraine	6	5	5	7	6	6	1	2	10
02	Belarus	3	2	3	4	1	2	5	4	7
03	Azerbaijan									
04	Iceland	19	18	17	19	19	18	18	21	
05	Norway	20	21	20	20	18	20	19	24	
06	Romania	5	6	2	2	3	4	9	5	6
07	Armenia	25	25	25	25	25	25	25	25	
08	Montenegro	9	11	10	9	10	10	22	18	
09	Poland	10	10	12	11	12	11	12	9	2
10	Greece	4	4	6	5	7	5	11	7	4
11	Austria	24	24	23	24	23	24	3	10	1
12	Germany	23	22	22	21	22	22	17	23	
13	Sweden	22	23	24	23	24	23	7	13	
14	France	15	12	15	13	14	14	24	22	
15	Russia	1	3	1	1	2	1	2	1	12
16	Italy	8	7	9	6	5	7	23	16	
17	Slovenia	11	8	8	10	8	9	21	15	
18	Finland	14	15	14	15	16	15	20	20	
19	Spain	12	13	11	14	11	12	15	12	
20	Switzerland	21	20	21	22	21	21	6	11	
21	Hungary	2	1	4	3	4	3	4	3	8
22	Malta	7	9	7	8	9	8	8	6	5
23	Denmark	17	16	18	17	17	17	16	19	
24	Netherlands	18	19	19	18	20	19	13	17	
25	San Marino	13	14	13	12	13	13	10	8	3
26	United Kingdom	16	17	16	16	15	16	14	14	
