= Kosalar =

Kosalar or Kasalar or Kyosalar may refer to:

- Kosalar, Agdam, Azerbaijan
- Kosalar, Khojali, Azerbaijan
- Kosalar, Lankaran, Azerbaijan
- Kosalar, Qazakh, Azerbaijan
- Kosalar, Lachin, Azerbaijan
