= Azerbaijan in the Eurovision Song Contest 2012 =

- Eurovision Song Contest 2012
- Participating broadcaster: İctimai Televiziya (İTV)
- Country: Azerbaijan
- Selection process: Artist: Milli Seçim Turu 2012; Song: Internal selection
- Selection date: Artist: 12 February 2012; Song: 17 March 2012

Competing entry
- Song: "When the Music Dies"
- Artist: Sabina Babayeva
- Songwriters: Anders Bagge; Sandra Bjurman; Stefan Örn; Johan Kronlund

Placement
- Final result: 4th, 150 points

Participation chronology

Azerbaijan was represented at the Eurovision Song Contest 2012 with the song "When the Music Dies", written by Anders Bagge, Sandra Bjurman, Stefan Örn, and Johan Kronlund, and performed by Sabina Babayeva. The Azerbaijani participant broadcaster, İctimai Televiziya (İTV), selected its performer through the competition Milli Seçim Turu 2012 and, subsequently, the song internally once the national final was over. In addition, İTV was also the host broadcaster and staged the event at the Baku Crystal Hall in Baku, after winning the previous edition with the song "Running Scared" performed by Ell and Nikki.

Following eight heats, a semi-final and a final on 12 February 2012, a seven-member jury selected Sabina Babayeva as the Azerbaijani performer for Eurovision. The song "When the Music Dies" was internally selected and presented to the public on 17 March.

As the host country, Azerbaijan qualified to compete directly in the final of the Eurovision Song Contest. Performing in position 13 during the final, Azerbaijan placed fourth out of the 26 participating countries with 261 points.

== Background ==
Prior to the 2012 contest, İctimai Televiziya (İTV) had participated in the Eurovision Song Contest representing Azerbaijan four times since its first entry in 2008. It had won the contest on one occasion in 2011 with the song "Running Scared" performed by Ell and Nikki. Since its debut in 2008, it has had a string of successful results, qualifying to the final and placing in the top ten each year, including a third-place result in 2009 with the song "Always" performed by AySel and Arash.

As part of its duties as participating broadcaster, İTV organises the selection of its entry in the Eurovision Song Contest and broadcasts the event in the country. İTV had used various methods to select its entries in the past, including internal selections of both the artist and song, as well as national finals to select its artist followed by an internal selection to determine the song. In 2011, the broadcaster organized a national final titled Milli Seçim Turu, which resulted in the selection of a winning performer that would subsequently be given an internally selected song to perform at Eurovision. The procedure was continued for the selection of its 2012 entry.

== Before Eurovision ==
=== Milli Seçim Turu 2012 ===
Milli Seçim Turu 2012 was the national final organised by İTV that selected the Azerbaijani performer for the Eurovision Song Contest 2012. The competition consisted of ten shows that commenced on 28 November 2011 and concluded with a winning artist on 12 February 2012. All shows were hosted by Husniyya Maharramova, Leyla Aliyeva and Kamran Quliyev and broadcast on İTV as well as streamed online via the broadcaster's website itv.az. The final was also streamed online at the official Eurovision Song Contest website eurovision.tv and broadcast in Turkey on TRT Müzik as well as in Malta on Television Malta (TVM).

==== Format ====
The national final consisted of two stages. The first stage involved an audition period where interested artists attended auditions. 70 artists were selected and advanced to the second stage, the televised shows. Ten shows including eight heats between 28 November 2011 and 28 January 2012 selected one artist from each show that would advance to the semi-final in January and February 2012. In the semi-final, five artists were selected to advance to the final on 12 February 2012. In the final, the winner was selected from the remaining five artists.

The results of the heats and semi-final were determined by the 50/50 combination of votes from public televoting and a seven-member jury panel. Each heat and semi-final took place across five days where the artists each performed cover versions of various songs in order to showcase their voice, dance ability and stage presence: world hits on Monday, Azerbaijani songs on Tuesday, Eurovision hits on Wednesday, songs with special focus on performance on Thursday and a song of their choice on Friday when the results were also announced. For each of the nine shows, the public was able to cast their votes through telephone or SMS over the five days. In the final, the jury selected the Azerbaijani Eurovision contestant.

The members of the jury were:

- Ismail Omarov – General Director of İTV
- Manzar Nuraliyeva – representative of the Ministry of Culture and Tourism of Azerbaijan
- Faiq Suceddinov – singer
- Zumrud Dadashzadeh – professor at the Baku Music Academy
- Zulfiyya Khanbabayeva – singer
- Tunzale Agayeva – singer and composer
- Rauf Babayev – singer

==== Competing artists ====
On 15 October 2011, İTV called for interested artists to submit their applications to the broadcaster by 25 October 2011. Eligible artists were those that were citizens of Azerbaijan or part of the Azerbaijani diaspora. 72 artists were selected for the competition from 119 applicants based on the decision of İTV and a five-member jury panel following a casting round held on 3, 5 and 7 November 2011. The members of the jury were Leyla Aliyeva (Azerbaijani commentator of the Eurovision Song Contest), Husniyya Maharramova (Azerbaijani commentator of the Eurovision Song Contest), Zahra Badalbeyli (musician and poet), Natavan Sheykhova (singer) and Tunzale Agayeva (singer and composer). Two of the selected artists, one of them being Rana Imamaliyeva who was set to perform in the fourth heat, later withdrew before the competition.

==== Shows ====
===== Heats =====
The eight heats took place between 28 November 2011 and 28 January 2012 at the İTV studios in Baku. The 70 artists each performed cover versions of various songs over five days and one artist was selected from each heat to advance to the semi-final based on the results of a public televote and a jury. Sabina Babayeva, who was set to perform in the sixth heat, was rescheduled to perform in the seventh heat due to illness.

Heat 1 – 28 November–2 December 2011
R/O	Artist	Place
1	Ramin Guliyev	4
2	Janana Zeynalova	7
3	Orkhan Mirzayev	8
4	Samra Rahimli	3
5	Kanan Gadimov	5
6	Anastasiya Bedritskaya	9
7	Amil Gojayev	6
8	Orkhan Karimli	1
9	Elnara Hasanova	2

Heat 2 – 5–9 December 2011
R/O	Artist	Place
1	Rufat Aliyev	8
2	Mehriban Sadykhova	9
3	Farid Hasanov	3
4	Ilham Hamidov	4
5	Huseyn Abdullayev	2
6	Maryam Karimova	1
7	Sehri Rahimova	6
8	Live or Leave	7
9	Elvin Babazadeh	5

Heat 3 – 12–16 December 2011
R/O	Artist	Place
1	Khayyam Mustafazadeh	1
2	Farid Ramazanov	7
3	Rustam Allazov	5
4	Rovshan Azizov	4
5	Aysel Guluzadeh	6
6	Yelena Karimova	9
7	Anar Safarov	3
8	Altun Zeynalov	2
9	Aytaj Valiyeva	8

Heat 4 – 19–23 December 2011
R/O	Artist	Place
1	Orkhan Nasibov	7
2	Emin Hasan	6
3	Empathy	4
4	Rinat Aslanov	8
5	Nigar Babayeva	3
6	Nadezhda Mikayilova	2
7	Fagan Safarov	1
8	Kamran Azizov	5

Heat 5 – 26–30 December 2011
R/O	Artist	Place
1	Elnara Kazimova	6
2	Azad Shabanov	2
3	Samir Mammadov	7
4	Elton Ibrahimov	1
5	Gunay Ahmadova	4
6	Yan Kashepava	8
7	Suleyman Aghakishiyev	9
8	Fidan Huseynova	5
9	Aydin Eyvazzadeh	3

Heat 6 – 2–6 January 2012
R/O	Artist	Place
1	Habil Ahmadov	4
2	Orkhan Efendi	5
3	Ramila Muradova	3
4	Elgiz Mammadov	6
5	Adil Bakhishli	1
6	Bakhtiyar Gasimov	2
7	Jahangir Gasimzadeh	7
8	Vlada Akhundova	8

Heat 7 – 9–13 January 2012
R/O	Artist	Place
1	Erkin Osmanli	8
2	Ad Gloriam	4
3	Ayla Idrisova	2
4	Kamran Abdullayev	5
5	Sabina Babayeva	1
6	Khana Hasanova	3
7	Khayal Taghiyev	9
8	Natig Baghirov	6
9	Azer Salimli	7

Heat 8 – 23–28 January 2012
R/O	Artist	Place
1	Tofig Hajiyev	5
2	Rinat Alimov	9
3	Arzu Ismayilova	1
4	Ali Mammadli	7
5	Ulkar Guliyeva	4
6	Abbas Karimli	6
7	Zaur Amiraslanov	3
8	Ulvi Rashidov	2
9	Caspian Dreamers	8

===== Semi-final =====
The semi-final took place between 30 January 2012 and 3 February 2012 at the İTV studios in Baku. The remaining eight artists each performed cover versions of various songs over five days and the top five artists were selected to advance to the final based on the results of a public televote and a jury.

Semi-final – 30 January–3 February 2012
R/O	Artist	Televote		Result
R/O	Artist	Votes	Rank	Result
1	Orkhan Karimli	2,259	1	Advanced
2	Maryam Karimova	233	7	—N/a
3	Khayyam Mustafazadeh	211	8	—N/a
4	Fagan Safarov	818	5	Advanced
5	Elton Ibrahimov	1,555	3	Advanced
6	Adil Bakhishli	455	6	—N/a
7	Sabina Babayeva	1,098	4	Advanced
8	Arzu Ismayilova	1,886	2	Advanced

===== Final =====
The final took place on 12 February 2012 at the Heydar Aliyev Palace in Baku. The remaining five artists each performed three cover versions of various songs and Sabina Babayeva was selected by the jury as the winner. In addition to the performances of the artists, Aynur Iskenderli, Anar Şaşali, Temur Bayramov, Arzu Aliyeva, 2010 Azerbaijani Eurovision entrant Safura, Azerbaijani Eurovision Song Contest 2011 winner Ell and Nikki, 2012 Maltese Eurovision entrant Kurt Calleja and 2012 Turkish Eurovision entrant Can Bonomo performed during the show as guests.

Final – 12 February 2012
R/O	Artist	Song 1	R/O	Song 2	R/O	Song 3	Place
1	Orkhan Karimli	"Azərbaycan"	6	"Milim"	11	"Aşk Kaç Beden Giyer?/Superman"	—N/a
2	Sabina Babayeva	"Səni Qəmli Görəndə"	7	"Hero"	12	"Soul Sister"	1
3	Elton Ibrahimov	"Yagızam Yalgız"	8	"There Goes My Baby"	13	"Popular"	—N/a
4	Fagan Safarov	N/A	9	"Lijepa Tena"	14	"Grenade"	—N/a
5	Arzu Ismayilova	"Senden Nigaranam"	10	"Only Girl"	15	"Someone Like You"	—N/a

=== Song selection ===
On 17 March 2012, İTV announced that Sabina Babayeva would be performing the song "When the Music Dies". The selection of the song was based on the decision of İTV and a national jury panel. "When the Music Dies" was written by Anders Bagge, Sandra Bjurman, Stefan Örn and Johan Kronlund, and was presented on the same day. The official music video was later released on 19 March 2012. In regards to the song, Babayeva stated: "'When the Music Dies' is a very special song. I feel it. Every time I sing, it feels like it's happening to me again. I think everybody has had this kind of moment in their life. Actually, I do believe music really should not die, because it helps us to stay alive no matter what happens." An Azerbaijani version of "When the Music Dies", titled "Gəl", was later released on 13 April 2012.

=== Promotion ===
Sabina Babayeva made several appearances across Europe to specifically promote "When the Music Dies" as the Azerbaijani Eurovision entry. Between 6 and 7 April, Babayeva took part in promotional activities in Hungary by appearing during the MTV programmes Marslakók, Ma Reggel and Kívánságkosár. On 21 April, Babayeva performed during the Eurovision in Concert event which was held at the Melkweg venue in Amsterdam, Netherlands and hosted by Cornald Maas and Ruth Jacott. On 23 April, Babayeva performed during the London Eurovision Party, which was held at the Shadow Lounge venue in London, United Kingdom and hosted by Nicki French and Paddy O'Connell. Between 3 and 4 May, Babayeva completed promotional activities in Malta by appearing during the TVM talk show programmes Ħadd Għalik and Xarabank.

== At Eurovision ==
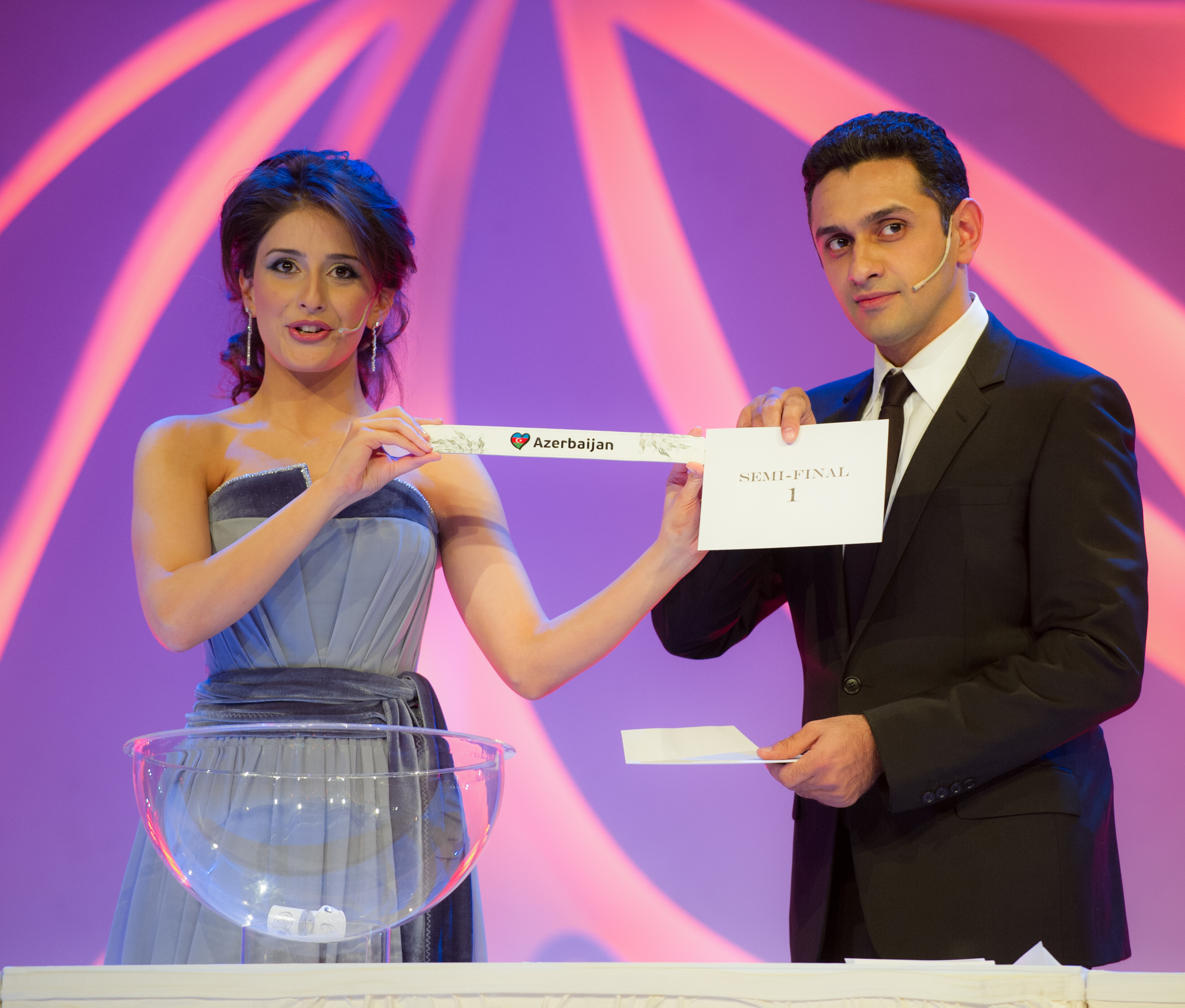
The semi-final allocation draw for the Eurovision Song Contest 2012 took place at the Buta Palace in Baku on 25 January 2012

According to Eurovision rules, all nations with the exceptions of the host country and the "Big Five" (France, Germany, Italy, Spain and the United Kingdom) are required to qualify from one of two semi-finals in order to compete for the final; the top ten countries from each semi-final progress to the final. As the host country, Azerbaijan automatically qualified to compete in the final on 26 May 2012. In addition to their participation in the final, Azerbaijan is also required to broadcast and vote in one of the two semi-finals. During the semi-final allocation draw on 25 January 2012, Azerbaijan was assigned to broadcast and vote in the first semi-final on 22 May 2012.

The two semi-finals and final were broadcast in Azerbaijan on İTV with commentary by Konul Arifgizi and Saleh Baghirov. İTV appointed Safura Alizadeh, who represented Azerbaijan the 2010 contest, as its spokesperson to announce the Azerbaijani votes during the final.

=== Final ===
Sabina Babayeva took part in technical rehearsals on 19 and 20 May, followed by dress rehearsals on 25 and 26 May. This included the jury final on 25 May where the professional juries of each country watched and voted on the competing entries. As the host nation, Azerbaijan's running order position in the final was decided through another draw on 20 March 2012. Azerbaijan was drawn to perform in position 13. While Azerbaijan had already been drawn to perform in position 13, it was determined following the second semi-final winners' press conference that Azerbaijan would perform following Norway and before the entry from Romania.

The Azerbaijani performance featured Sabina Babayeva performing in a white dress with silver sequins, feathers and a long train. Babayeva was flanked by three backing vocalists to the right and mugham performer Alim Qasimov to the left who sat on a glass platform. The LED screens displayed a moving abstract image of red paint being splashed and Babayeva's dress also displayed red and orange lighting effects. The three backing vocalists that joined Sabina Babayeva on stage were Anna Nilsson, Jennie Jahns and Marie Nordmark Sjöström. Azerbaijan placed fourth in the final, scoring 150 points.

=== Voting ===
Voting during the three shows consisted of 50 percent public televoting and 50 percent from a jury deliberation. The jury consisted of five music industry professionals who were citizens of the country they represent. This jury was asked to judge each contestant based on: vocal capacity; the stage performance; the song's composition and originality; and the overall impression by the act. In addition, no member of a national jury could be related in any way to any of the competing acts in such a way that they cannot vote impartially and independently.

Following the release of the full split voting by the EBU after the conclusion of the competition, it was revealed that Azerbaijan had placed fifth with the public televote and eighth with the jury vote. In the public vote, Azerbaijan scored 151 points and in the jury vote the nation scored 118 points.

Below is a breakdown of points awarded to Azerbaijan and awarded by Azerbaijan in the first semi-final and grand final of the contest. The nation awarded its 12 points to Albania in the semi-final and to Turkey in the final of the contest.

==== Points awarded to Azerbaijan ====
Points awarded to Azerbaijan (Final)
Score	Country
12 points	Lithuania; Malta; Turkey; Ukraine
10 points	Bulgaria; Georgia; Moldova; Russia
8 points	Cyprus; Israel
7 points	Belarus; Bosnia and Herzegovina
6 points	Slovakia
5 points	Greece; Montenegro
4 points	Albania; San Marino
3 points	Serbia
2 points	Macedonia; United Kingdom
1 point	Ireland

==== Points awarded by Azerbaijan ====
Points awarded by Azerbaijan (Semi-final 1)
Score	Country
12 points	Albania
10 points	Greece
8 points	Russia
7 points	Romania
6 points	Moldova
5 points	San Marino
4 points	Ireland
3 points	Latvia
2 points	Hungary
1 point	Cyprus

Points awarded by Azerbaijan (Final)
Score	Country
12 points	Turkey
10 points	Russia
8 points	Malta
7 points	Sweden
6 points	Romania
5 points	Greece
4 points	Lithuania
3 points	Ukraine
2 points	Cyprus
1 point	Ireland
