= Azerbaijan in the Eurovision Song Contest 2011 =

- Eurovision Song Contest 2011
- Participating broadcaster: İctimai Televiziya (İTV)
- Country: Azerbaijan
- Selection process: Artist: Milli Seçim Turu 2011; Song: Internal selection
- Selection date: Artist: 11 February 2011; Song: 14 March 2011

Competing entry
- Song: "Running Scared"
- Artist: Ell and Nikki
- Songwriters: Stefan Örn; Sandra Bjurman; Iain James Farquharson

Placement
- Semi-final result: Qualified (2nd, 122 points)
- Final result: 1st, 221 points

Participation chronology

Azerbaijan was represented at the Eurovision Song Contest 2011 with the song "Running Scared", written by Stefan Örn, Sandra Bjurman, and Iain James Farquharson, and performed by Ell and Nikki. The Azerbaijani participating broadcaster, İctimai Televiziya (İTV), selected its representative through Milli Seçim Turu 2011 and, subsequently, the song internally. Following seven heats, a semi-final and a final on 11 February 2011, a seven-member jury selected Nigar Jamal and Eldar Gasimov as the winner. The song "Running Scared" was internally selected and presented to the public on 14 March.

Azerbaijan was drawn to compete in the first semi-final of the Eurovision Song Contest which took place on 10 May 2011. Performing during the show in position 18, "Running Scared" was announced among the top 10 entries of the first semi-final and therefore qualified to compete in the final on 14 May. It was later revealed that Azerbaijan placed second out of the 19 participating countries in the semi-final with 122 points. In the final, Azerbaijan performed in position 19 and placed first out of the 25 participating countries, scoring 221 points. This was Azerbaijan's first win in the Eurovision Song Contest since its first entry in 2008.

== Background ==
Prior to the 2011 contest, İctimai Televiziya (İTV) had participated in the Eurovision Song Contest representing Azerbaijan three times since its first entry in 2008. Since its debut, it has had a string of successful results, qualifying to the final and placing in the top ten each year, including a third-place result in 2009 with the song "Always" performed by AySel and Arash. In 2010, "Drip Drop" performed by Safura placed fifth.

As part of its duties as participating broadcaster, İTV organises the selection of its entry in the Eurovision Song Contest and broadcasts the event in the country. The broadcaster confirmed its intentions to participate at the 2011 contest on 31 May 2010. İTV had used various methods to select its entry in the past, including internal selections as well as national finals to select both the artist and song. For its 2011 entry, the broadcaster opted to organize a new national final titled Milli Seçim Turu, which featured a similar process to the Land of Fire national final used in 2008 and 2010 where the selection of a winning performer would subsequently be given an internally selected song to perform at Eurovision.

== Before Eurovision ==
=== Milli Seçim Turu 2011 ===
Milli Seçim Turu 2011 was the national final organised by İTV that selected its representative for the Eurovision Song Contest 2011. The competition consisted of nine shows that commenced on 15 November 2010 and concluded with a winning artist on 11 February 2011. All shows were broadcast on İTV and streamed online via the broadcaster's website itv.az. The final was also streamed online at the official Eurovision Song Contest website eurovision.tv and broadcast in Turkey on TRT Avaz as well as in Georgia on the GPB First Channel.

==== Format ====
The national final consisted of two stages. The first stage involved interested artists attending auditions after submitting applications between 5 and 15 October 2010. Eligible artists were those that were citizens of Azerbaijan or part of the Azerbaijani diaspora. 77 artists selected from 120 applicants advanced to the second stage, the televised shows. Nine shows including seven heats between 15 November 2010 and 31 December 2011 selected one artist from each show that would advance to the semi-final in January 2011. In the semi-final, five artists were selected to advance to the final on 11 February 2011. In the final, the winner was selected from the remaining five artists.

The results of the heats and semi-final were determined by the 50/50 combination of votes from public televoting and a seven-member jury panel. Each heat and semi-final took place across five days where the artists each performed cover versions of various songs in order to showcase their voice, dance ability and stage presence: world hits on Monday, Eurovision hits on Tuesday, Azerbaijani songs on Wednesday and a song of their choice on Thursday. The results were announced on Friday. For each of the eight shows, the public was able to cast their votes through telephone or SMS over the five days. In the final, the jury selected the Azerbaijani Eurovision contestant.

The members of the jury were:

- Ismail Omarov – General Director of İTV
- Lala Kazimova – President of the National Music Committee of Azerbaijan
- Rauf Babayev – singer
- Faiq Suceddinov – singer
- Zulfiyya Khanbabayeva – singer
- Zahra Badalbayli – musician and poet
- Manzar Nuraliyeva – representative of the Ministry of Culture and Tourism of Azerbaijan

==== Shows ====
===== Heats =====
The seven heats took place between 15 November 2010 and 31 December 2010 at the İTV studios in Baku, hosted by Husniyya Maharramova and Leyla Aliyeva. The 77 artists each performed cover versions of various songs over five days and one artist was selected from each heat to advance to the semi-final based on the results of a public televote and a jury. Tarik Yigit only participated in the first day of the first heat and therefore was disqualified from the competition. Eldar Gasimov and Nigar Jamal were awarded wildcards by the jury from the non-qualifying acts to advance to the semi-final. Nicola Barclay was also awarded a jury wildcard, however she withdrew on 11 January 2011 due to illness and changes in the competition format.

Heat 1 – 15–19 November 2010
R/O	Artist	Place	Result
1	Khana Hasanova	7	—N/a
2	Aygun Ismayilova	5	—N/a
3	Adil Bakhishli	2	—N/a
4	Tofig "Mr. Toto" Hajiyev	6	—N/a
5	Chingiz Mustafayev	1	Qualified
6	Tarik Yigit	—	Disqualified
7	Ulviyya Abbasova	8	—N/a
8	Gulchohra Babayeva	9	—N/a
9	Next	3	—N/a
10	Zulfunaz Rajabova	4	—N/a

Heat 2 – 22–26 November 2010
R/O	Artist	Place	Result
1	East Groove	3	—N/a
2	Fizza Nadirova	7	—N/a
3	Sitara Nasirova	6	—N/a
4	Emin Hasan	9	—N/a
5	Nazrin Zarbaliyeva	8	—N/a
6	Ulvi Rashidov	2	—N/a
7	Gunay Alakbarova	4	—N/a
8	Yegana Aghayeva	11	—N/a
9	Shola Safaraliyeva	5	—N/a
10	Ulviyya Talishinskaya	10	—N/a
11	Nurlan Novrasli	1	Qualified

Heat 3 – 29 November–3 December 2010
R/O	Artist	Place	Result
1	Dilshan Ibadova	8	—N/a
2	Günay Ibrahimli	1	Qualified
3	Khayyam Nisanov	3	—N/a
4	Sevinj Aghashirinova	6	—N/a
5	Kanan Gadimov	5	—N/a
6	Nigar Babayeva	9	—N/a
7	Orkhan Aghayev	4	—N/a
8	Farid Mammadov	10	—N/a
9	Nazir Aghayev	11	—N/a
10	Nicola Barclay	2	Withdrew
11	Rinat Alimov	7	—N/a

Heat 4 – 6–10 December 2010
R/O	Artist	Place	Result
1	Said Ismayilzadeh	10	—N/a
2	Aydan Rustamova	2	—N/a
3	Arzum Khalilova	1	Qualified
4	Emilia Yagubova	8	—N/a
5	Ramin Guliyev	7	—N/a
6	Chinara Nazarli	6	—N/a
7	Milan Mammadov	9	—N/a
8	Sabina Babayeva	3	—N/a
9	Rahima Hasanalizadeh	5	—N/a
10	Leyla Dadashova	11	—N/a
11	Javanshir Hajiyev	4	—N/a

Heat 5 – 13–17 December 2010
R/O	Artist	Place	Result
1	Empathy	8	—N/a
2	Elmar Asgarov	9	—N/a
3	Altun Zeynalov	6	—N/a
4	Emin Nasirli	2	—N/a
5	Janana Zeynalova	10	—N/a
6	Rovshan Jivishov	4	—N/a
7	Jamila Hashimova	3	—N/a
8	Aynishan Quliyeva	1	Qualified
9	Gulnar Nabi-Chingiz	7	—N/a
10	Dinara Jafarova	11	—N/a
11	Orkhan Israfilov	5	—N/a

Heat 6 – 20–24 December 2010
R/O	Artist	Place	Result
1	Ilgara Ibrahimova	1	Qualified
2	Eldar Gasimov	2	Wildcard
3	Seyran Ismayilkhanov	5	—N/a
4	Leyla Idrisova	7	—N/a
5	Rustam Allazov	6	—N/a
6	Sultan Mashadiyev	8	—N/a
7	Elyana Ahmadova	3	—N/a
8	Fuad Mustafazadeh	10	—N/a
9	Sarkhan Mammadov	9	—N/a
10	Diana Hajiyeva	4	—N/a

Heat 7 – 24–31 December 2010
R/O	Artist	Place	Result
1	Orkhan Nasibov	12	—N/a
2	Sabina Mammadova	6	—N/a
3	Habil Ahmadov	11	—N/a
4	Sadikh Aghamaliyev	9	—N/a
5	Nigar Dargahzadeh	5	—N/a
6	Ilhama Gasimova	1	Qualified
7	Davud Asgarli	8	—N/a
8	Lala Aliyeva	7	—N/a
9	Tahir Guliyev	10	—N/a
10	Gunay Ahmadova	4	—N/a
11	Azad Shabanov	3	—N/a
12	Nigar Jamal	2	Wildcard

===== Semi-final =====
The semi-final took place between 10 and 14 January 2011 at the İTV studios in Baku, hosted by Husniyya Maharramova and Leyla Aliyeva. The remaining nine artists each performed cover versions of various songs over five days and the top five artists were selected to advance to the final based on the results of a public televote and a jury.

Semi-final – 10–14 January 2011
R/O	Artist	Televote		Result
R/O	Artist	Votes	Rank	Result
1	Chingiz Mustafayev	4,030	7	—N/a
2	Nurlan Novrasli	18,750	3	—N/a
3	Gunay Ibrahimli	1,033	8	—N/a
4	Arzum Khalilova	11,744	5	—N/a
5	Aynishan Quliyeva	17,202	4	Qualified
6	Ilgara Ibrahimova	30,147	2	Qualified
7	Eldar Gasimov	8,556	6	Qualified
8	Ilhama Gasimova	31,453	1	Qualified
9	Nigar Jamal	731	9	Qualified

===== Final =====
The final took place on 11 February 2011 at the State Academic Opera and Ballet Theatre in Baku, hosted by Leyla Aliyeva. The remaining five artists each performed four cover versions of various songs: a world hit, an Azerbaijani song, a Eurovision hit from songs performed during the Eurovision Song Contest 2009 and a song of their choice. Nigar Jamal and Eldar Gasimov were selected by the jury as the winners. In addition to the performances of the artists, David Vendetta, Safura (who represented Azerbaijan in 2010), Sofia Nizharadze (who represented Georgia in 2010), Senit (who represented San Marino in 2011), and Anna Rossinelli (who represented Switzerland in 2011), performed during the show as guests.

Final – 11 February 2011
Artist	R/O	Song 1 (World hit)	R/O	Song 2 (Azerbaijani song)	R/O	Song 3 (Eurovision hit)	R/O	Song 4 (Artist's choice)
Nigar Jamal	1	"Cry Me a River"	6	"Azərbaycan"	11	"It's My Time"	16	"Pretty Girls Adore Diamonds"
Aynishan Quliyeva	2	"Sway"	7	"Sevgi bu"	12	"Carry Me in Your Dreams"	17	"Esq Dəlisi"
Ilgara Ibrahimova	3	"Thank You"	8	"Nigaranam"	13	"Mamo"	18	"In Your Eyes"
Eldar Gasimov	4	"Je t'aime"	9	"Gəl Ey Səhər"	14	"Believe Again"	19	"When You Believe"
Ilhama Gasimova	5	"The Game of Love"	10	"Sevənlər"	15	"Je ne sais quoi"	20	"Out of Reach"

=== Song selection ===
On 11 January 2011, the broadcaster called for interested songwriters to submit their entries by 10 February 2011. Songwriters could be of any nationality. On 13 March 2011, İTV announced that Ell and Nikki would be performing the song "Running Scared". The selection of the song was based on the decision of İTV and the seven-member jury panel of Milli Seçim Turu 2011 from five potential songs shortlisted among 70 submissions from local and international songwriters. "Running Scared" was written by Stefan Örn, Sandra Bjurman and Iain James Farquharson, and was presented on the same day via the release of the official music video.

=== Promotion ===
Ell and Nikki made several appearances across Europe to specifically promote "Running Scared" as the Azerbaijani Eurovision entry. Between 15 and 16 April, Ell and Nikki took part in promotional activities in Malta by appearing during the TVM talk show programmes Il-Lejla and Xarabank. On 17 April, Ell and Nikki performed "Running Scared" as the opening act for De-Phazz's concert which was held at the Glavclub venue in Saint Petersburg, Russia. On 18 April, Ell and Nikki appeared during the ETV morning show programme Terevisioon in Estonia. On 20 April, Ell and Nikki performed "Running Scared" at a live concert which was held in Kyiv, Ukraine.

== At Eurovision ==
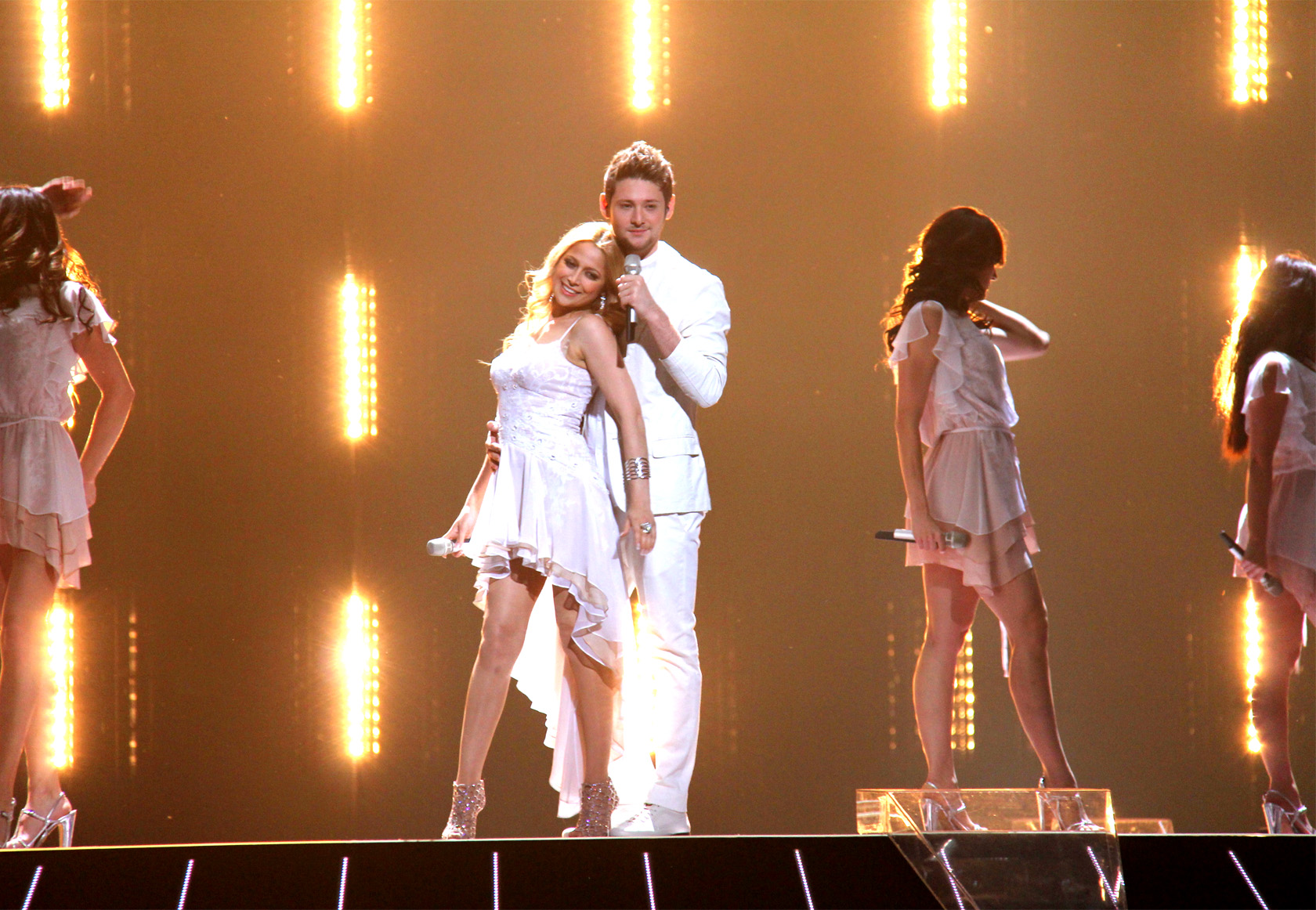
Ell and Nikki performing at the Eurovision Song Contest

According to Eurovision rules, all nations with the exceptions of the host country and the "Big Five" (France, Germany, Italy, Spain, and the United Kingdom) are required to qualify from one of two semi-finals in order to compete for the final; the top ten countries from each semi-final progress to the final. The European Broadcasting Union (EBU) split up the competing countries into six different pots based on voting patterns from previous contests, with countries with favourable voting histories put into the same pot. On 17 January 2011, a special allocation draw was held which placed each country into one of the two semi-finals, as well as which half of the show they would perform in. Azerbaijan was placed into the first semi-final, to be held on 10 May 2011, and was scheduled to perform in the second half of the show. The running order for the semi-finals was decided through another draw on 15 March 2011 and Azerbaijan was set to perform in position 18, following the entry from Lithuania and before the entry from Greece.

The two semi-finals and final were broadcast in Azerbaijan on İTV with commentary by Leyla Aliyeva. İTV appointed Safura Alizadeh, who represented Azerbaijan in 2010, as its spokesperson to announce the Azerbaijani votes during the final.

=== Semi-final ===
Ell and Nikki took part in technical rehearsals on 2 and 6 May, followed by dress rehearsals on 9 and 10 May. This included the jury final where professional juries of each country watched and voted on the competing entries.

The Azerbaijani performance featured Ell and Nikki dressed in white outfits designed by Lars Wallin and performing with four backing vocalists. The performance began with the backing vocalists standing in a line before walking off in sync to reveal Ell and Nikki behind them. The LED screens displayed predominantly white colours which later changed to gold blinking lights and the performance also included a pyrotechnic waterfall effect. The performance was directed by Rennie Mirro and Filip Adamo. The four backing vocalists that joined Ell and Nikki on stage were Åsa Engman, Jessica Marberger, Lisa Stadell and Vera Prada.

At the end of the show, Azerbaijan was announced as having finished in the top ten and subsequently qualifying for the grand final. It was later revealed that Azerbaijan placed second in the semi-final, receiving a total of 122 points.

=== Final ===
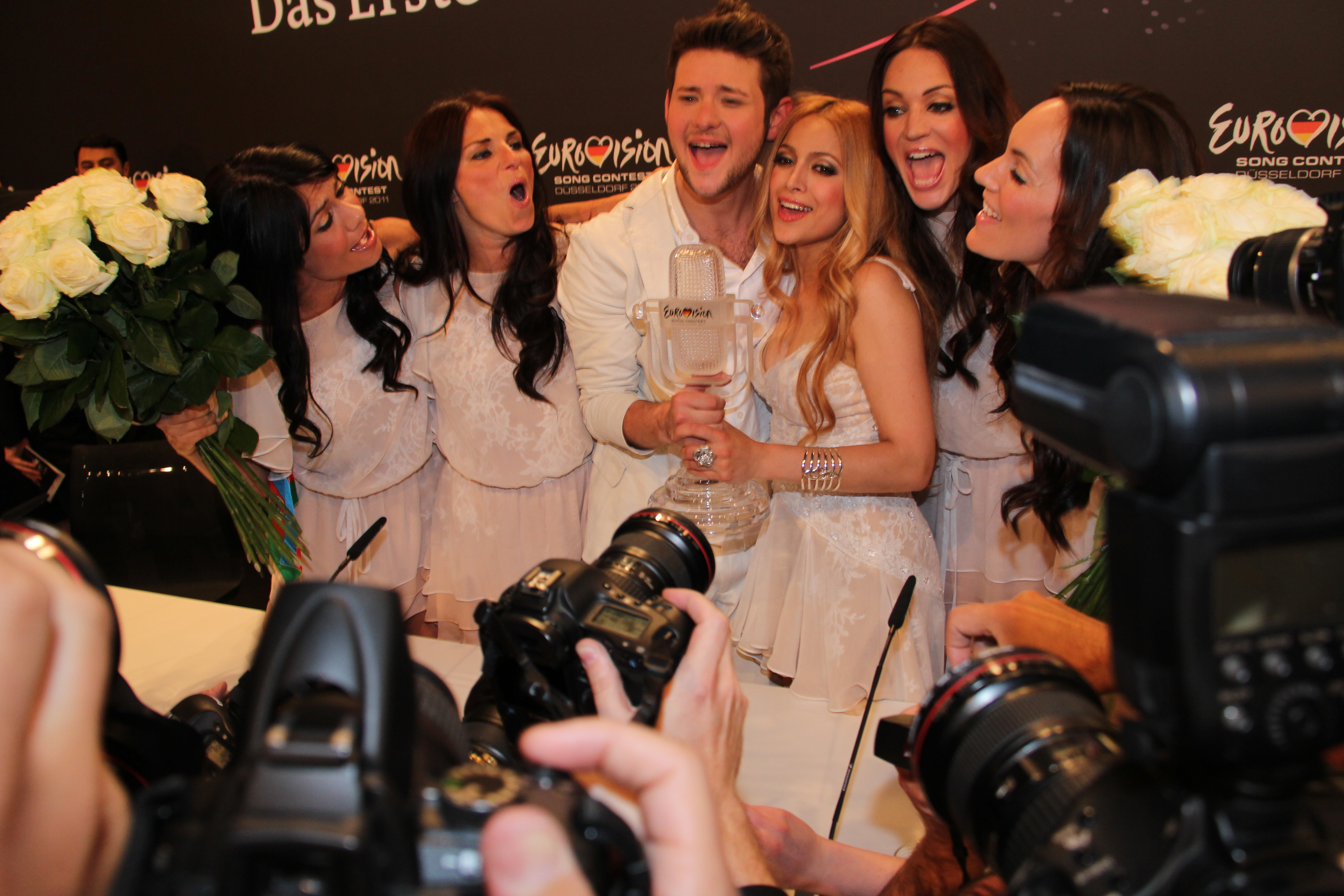
The Azerbaijani performers during the winner's press conference

Shortly after the first semi-final, a winners' press conference was held for the ten qualifying countries. As part of this press conference, the qualifying artists took part in a draw to determine the running order for the final. This draw was done in the order the countries were announced during the semi-final. Azerbaijan was drawn to perform in position 19, following the entry from Austria and before the entry from Slovenia.

Ell and Nikki once again took part in dress rehearsals on 13 and 14 May before the final, including the jury final where the professional juries cast their final votes before the live show. The duo performed a repeat of their semi-final performance during the final on 14 May. Azerbaijan won the contest placing first with a score of 221 points. This was Azerbaijan's first victory in the Eurovision Song Contest since its first entry in 2008.

=== Voting ===
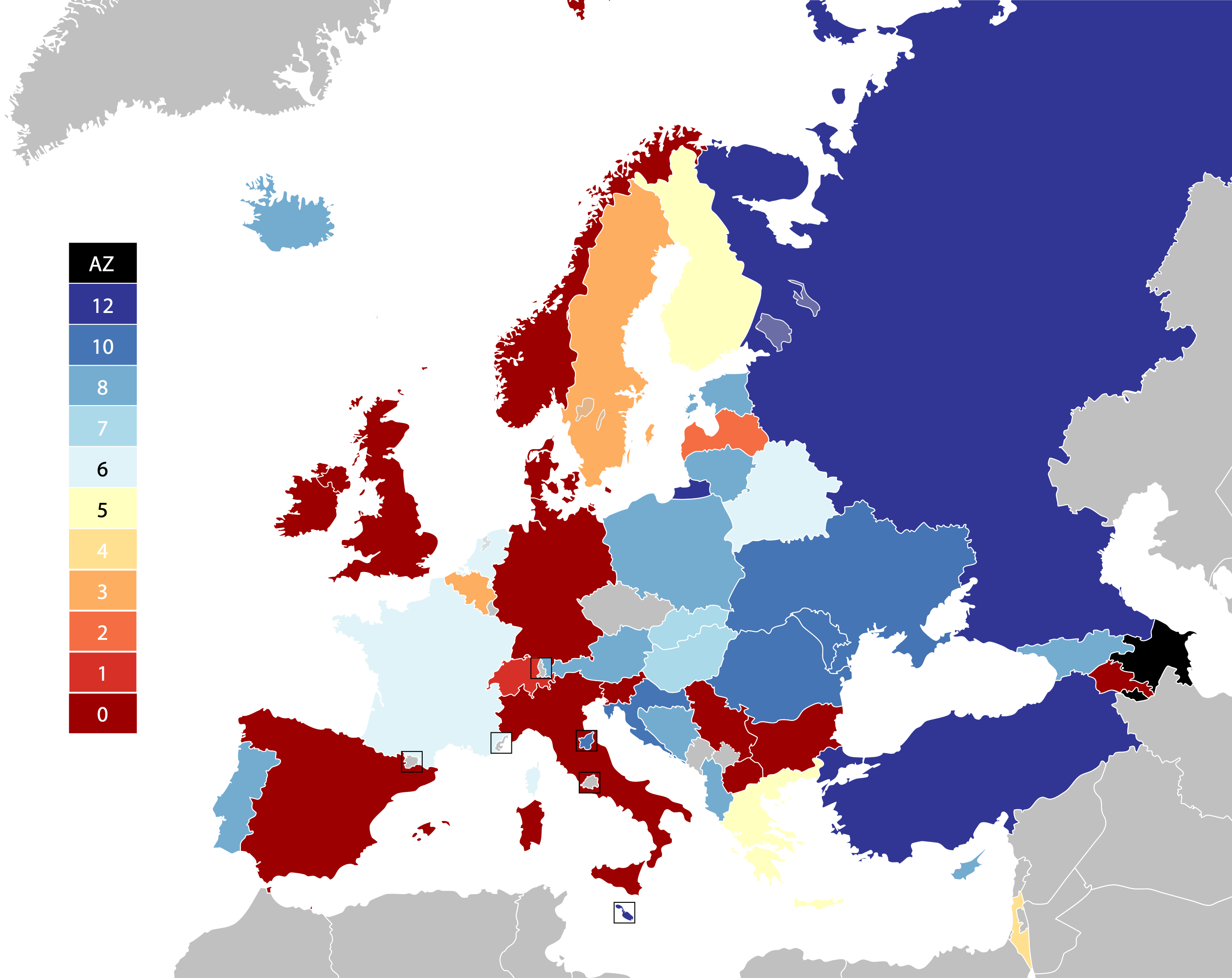
Points awarded to Azerbaijan

Voting during the three shows consisted of 50 percent public televoting and 50 percent from a jury deliberation. The jury consisted of five music industry professionals who were citizens of the country they represent. This jury was asked to judge each contestant based on: vocal capacity; the stage performance; the song's composition and originality; and the overall impression by the act. In addition, no member of a national jury could be related in any way to any of the competing acts in such a way that they cannot vote impartially and independently.

Following the release of the full split voting by the EBU after the conclusion of the competition, it was revealed that Azerbaijan had placed first with the public televote and second with the jury vote in the final. In the public vote, Azerbaijan scored 223 points, while with the jury vote, Azerbaijan scored 182 points. In the first semi-final, Azerbaijan placed second with both the public televote and the jury vote. In the public vote, Azerbaijan scored 124 points, while with the jury vote, Azerbaijan scored 109 points. With their entry only receiving 5.26 points per country, Azerbaijan holds the record of the lowest average score for a winning song under the previous voting system (in place from 1975 to 2015). Under the current voting system (since 2016), no winning song has received this low average score per set of votes (number of voting countries × 2). Since the introduction of semi-finals and the split jury-televoting system, they are also the third winner not to achieve first place in their semi-final (which was won by Greece), and not winning according to the juries' ranking (which placed Italy first).

Below is a breakdown of points awarded to Azerbaijan and awarded by Azerbaijan in the first semi-final and grand final of the contest. The nation awarded its 12 points to Turkey in the semi-final and to Ukraine in the final of the contest.

==== Points awarded to Azerbaijan ====
Points awarded to Azerbaijan (Semi-final 1)
Score	Country
12 points	Georgia; Turkey
10 points	Croatia; Lithuania; Malta; Russia
8 points	Iceland; Poland
7 points	Greece; Hungary; Portugal
6 points	
5 points	Albania; Finland; San Marino
4 points	United Kingdom
3 points	
2 points	
1 point	Spain; Switzerland

Points awarded to Azerbaijan (Final)
Score	Country
12 points	Malta; Russia; Turkey
10 points	Croatia; Moldova; Romania; San Marino; Ukraine
8 points	Albania; Austria; Bosnia and Herzegovina; Cyprus; Estonia; Georgia; Iceland; Lithuania; Poland; Portugal
7 points	Hungary; Slovakia
6 points	Belarus; France; Netherlands
5 points	Finland; Greece
4 points	Israel
3 points	Belgium; Sweden
2 points	Latvia
1 point	Switzerland

==== Points awarded by Azerbaijan ====
Points awarded by Azerbaijan (Semi-final 1)
Score	Country
12 points	Turkey
10 points	Greece
8 points	Georgia
7 points	Malta
6 points	San Marino
5 points	Russia
4 points	Croatia
3 points	Finland
2 points	Albania
1 point	Norway

Points awarded by Azerbaijan (Final)
Score	Country
12 points	Ukraine
10 points	Georgia
8 points	Greece
7 points	Moldova
6 points	Romania
5 points	United Kingdom
4 points	Russia
3 points	Sweden
2 points	Hungary
1 point	Italy

== After Eurovision ==
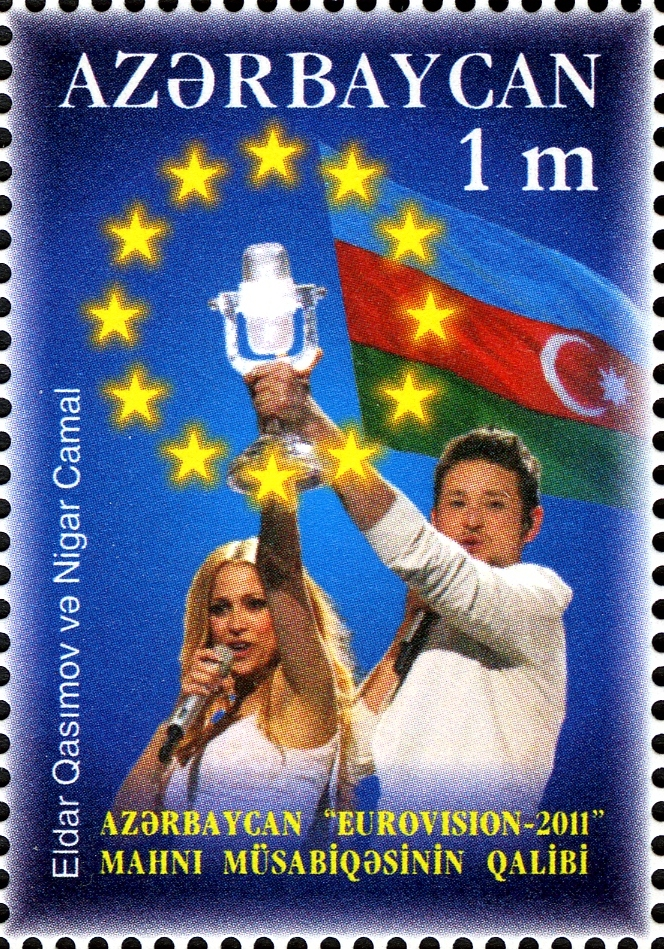
Azerbaijani stamp dedicated to Eurovision victory 2011.

Since winning the Eurovision final 2011, Jamal and Gasimov travelled to many European countries to perform their winning entry in the contest. The singers also received "Peace and Friendship Award" in Zonguldak's Ereğli district for carrying a Turkish flag onstage during final scene. Azerbaijan issued a postage stamp dedicated to Azerbaijan's victory with Gasimov and Jamal at Eurovision. In 2011, Ell and Nikki also became the official faces of Nar Mobile, one of Azerbaijan's mobile communication providers.
