= Eldar Gasimov =

Azerbaijani singer (born 1989)

Eldar Gasimov Eldar Qasımov
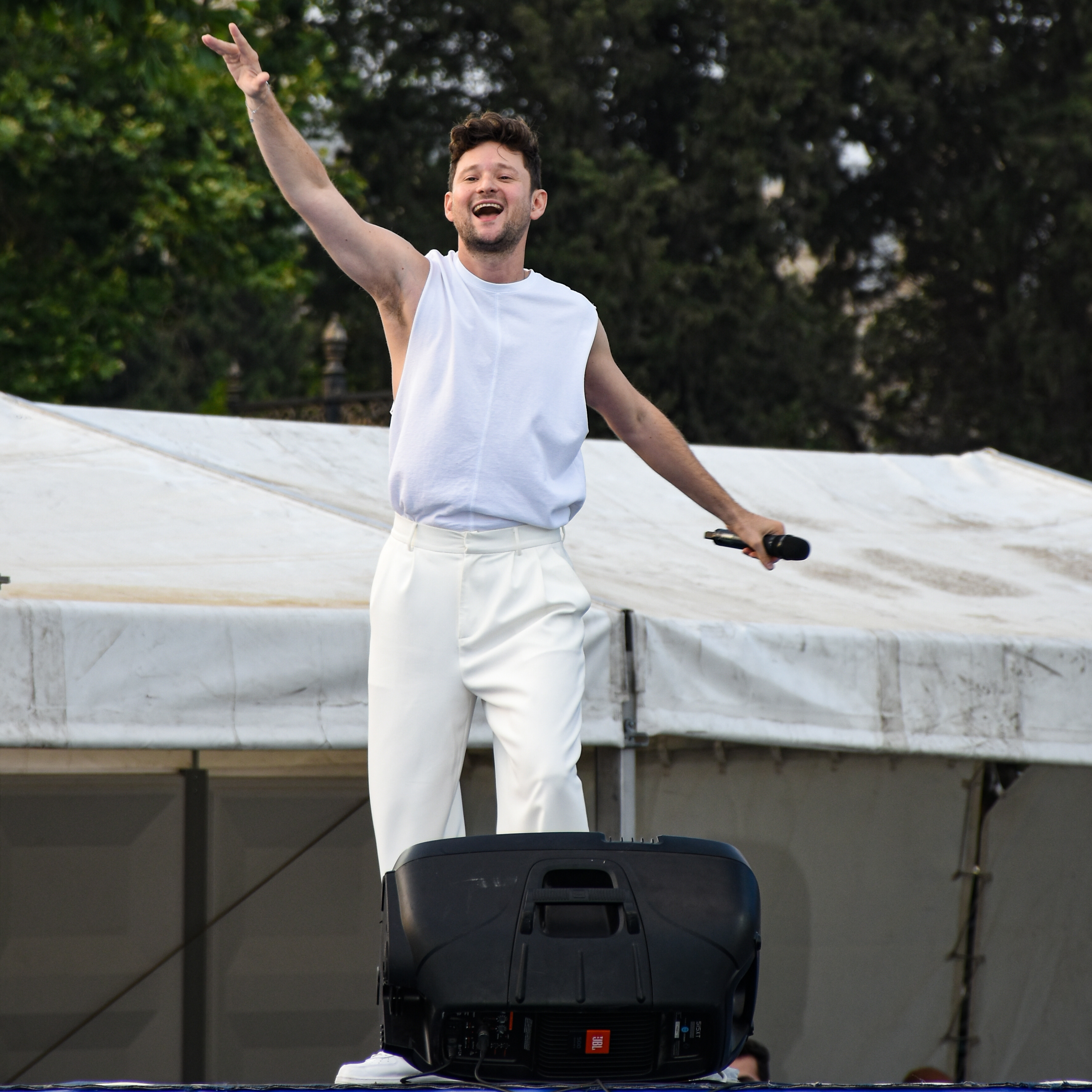
- Gasimov in 2023

Background information
- Born: Eldar Parviz oglu Gasimov; 4 June 1989 (age 37); Baku, Azerbaijani SSR, Soviet Union
- Genres: Pop; R&B; jazz-funk
- Occupation: Singer
- Years active: 2010–present
- Website: Eldar Qasimov profile

Eldar "Ell" Parviz oglu Gasimov (Azerbaijani: Eldar Pərviz oğlu Qasımov, IPA: [elˈdɑɾ pæɾˈvis oɣˈlu ˈɡɑsɯmof]; born 4 June 1989) is an Azerbaijani singer. He represented Azerbaijan in the Eurovision Song Contest 2011 alongside Nigar Jamal, winning the competition with the song "Running Scared". He co-hosted the Eurovision Song Contest 2012 in Baku.

== Early life ==
Eldar Gasimov is the great-grandson of Azerbaijani actor couple Honoured Artist of Azerbaijan Abbas Mirza Sharifzadeh and People's Artist of USSR Marziyya Davudova, and the grandson of People's Artist of Azerbaijan actress Firangiz Sharifova. Gasimov began singing when he was very young and has taken part in several concerts in various cities of Azerbaijan and Russia. Between 2001 and 2005 he received professional training in music and learned to play the piano.

Eldar Gasimov graduated from Baku Slavic University with a double major in international relations and regional geography. Since 2010, he has been a graduate student of international relations at the same university. Eldar Gasimov speaks Russian and German fluently and is also proficient in English.

== Career ==
=== Eurovision Song Contest 2011 ===
Gasimov took part in the Azerbaijani national selection, Milli Seçim Turu 2011. Gasımov's first appearance was in Heat 6, placing second with 10 points, behind winner Ilgara Ibrahimova with 12 points with both qualifying to the semi-final. Gasimov qualified from the semi-final along with four other artists to the final on 11 February 2011, where he and Nigar Jamal won the right to represent Azerbaijan at the Eurovision Song Contest 2011 in Düsseldorf, Germany in May 2011. They sang under the pseudonym Ell & Nikki the song "Running Scared" written by Stefan Örn and Sandra Bjurman from Sweden and Iain Farquharson from the UK, which won the competition with 221 points.

=== 2011–present: After Eurovision ===
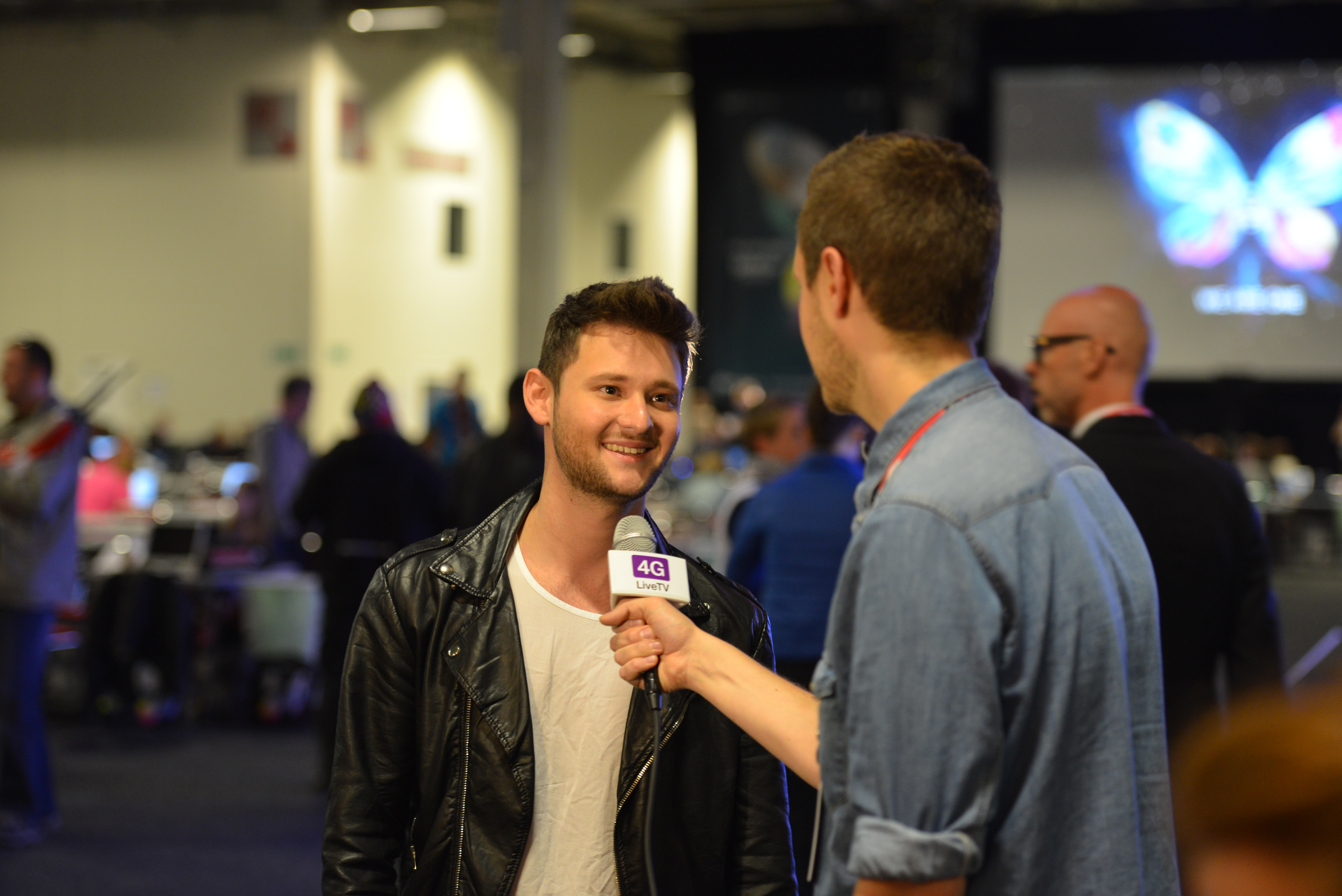
Eldar in Malmö during Eurovision Song Contest 2013

After winning the Eurovision Song Contest 2011 Gasimov and Jamal got to travel to a number of countries and perform their winning entry. In Azerbaijan 15,000 postage stamps in the denomination of 1 Azerbaijani manat were printed. The production of postage stamps in Azerbaijan were in dedication of Eldar and Nigar's victory at 2011 contest. In 2012, Eldar Gasimov was among five musicians from Azerbaijan chosen as the jury in the Danish national selection of the 2012 Eurovision contestant.

In January 2012, he released his first post-Eurovision song called "Birlikda nahayat" ("At last together"). Gasimov was one of the hosts of the Eurovision Song Contest 2012 held in Baku, Azerbaijan after his win the year before.

On 17 July 2012, Gasimov released the acoustic version of his new single I'm Free. The official video was released in September 2012. The original version of the track had been featured with famous Azerbaijani DJ/producer ALIGEE. The track had been produced in a studio of AzeriLife Music Entertainment by the executive record and music producer Farid (a.k.a. Phareed) Mammadov and Ali (a.k.a. ALIGEE) Abasbeili.

In October 2012, Eldar Gasimov announced on his social network account that he had been hired by the Baku Slavic University, where he had received his master's degree, to teach a course in international relations.

=== The Voice of Azerbaijan ===
Between 2021 and 2022, he served as a coach in the second season of The Voice of Azerbaijan. His contestant Nadir Rustamli won and represented Azerbaijan in the Eurovision Song Contest 2022, where he finished in 16th place.

== Discography ==
=== Singles ===
Year	Single	Peak chart position												Album
Year	Single	AUT (Austria)	BEL(Vl) (Flanders)	BEL(WAL) (Wallonia)	GER (Germany)	ICE (Iceland)	IRE (Republic of Ireland)	NL (Netherlands)	ROM (Romania)	RUS (Russia)	SVK (Slovakia)	SUI (Switzerland)	UK (United Kingdom)	Album
2011	"Running Scared" (with Nigar Jamal)	22	37	7	33	2	41	59	99	10	50	11	61	Play With Me (Nigar Jamal album)
2012	"Birlikdə nəhayət"	–	–	—	—	—	–	—	—	—	—	—	—	Non-album single
2012	"I'm Free" (with Aligee)	–	–	—	—	—	–	—	—	—	—	—	—	Non-album single
2013	"Music's Still Alive" (with Nigar Jamal)	–	–	—	—	—	–	—	—	—	—	—	—	Non-album single
2013	"Heartbreaker"	–	–	—	—	—	–	—	—	—	—	—	—	Non-album single
2013	"Waiting"	–	–	—	—	—	–	—	—	—	—	—	—	Waiting
2013	"Ангелы" (with SoSmile Project)	–	–	—	—	—	–	—	—	—	—	—	—	Non-album single
2014	"Onu Sən De"	–	–	—	—	—	–	—	—	—	—	—	—	Non-album single
2014	"Ice and Fire" (with Zlata Ognevich)	–	–	—	—	—	–	—	—	—	—	—	—	Non-album single
2014	"In Your Head"	–	–	—	—	—	–	—	—	—	—	—	—	Non-album single
2014	"Anladım"	–	–	—	—	—	–	—	—	—	—	—	—	Non-album single
2015	"The One"	–	—	—	—	—	–	—	—	—	—	—	—	Non-album single
2015	"Gülümse" (with Rustam)	–	–	—	—	—	–	—	—	—	—	—	—	Non-album single
2015	"Closer"	–	–	—	—	—	–	—	—	—	—	—	—	Non-album single
2016	"Sevgi Alovlandirandir"	–	–	—	—	—	–	—	—	—	—	—	—	Non-album single
2016	"1&Only"	–	–	—	—	—	–	—	—	—	—	—	—	Non-album single
2017	"Tell Me About Love"	–	–	—	—	—	–	—	—	—	—	—	—	Non-album single
2017	"Son Nəfəsim Ol"	–	–	—	—	—	–	—	—	—	—	—	—	Non-album single
2017	"Чи Була Любов"	–	–	—	—	—	–	—	—	—	—	—	—	Non-album single
2017	"Duman"	–	–	—	—	—	–	—	—	—	—	—	—	Non-album single
2017	"Yeni il gəlir"	–	–	—	—	—	–	—	—	—	—	—	—	Non-album single
2018	"I Miss You"	–	–	—	—	—	–	—	—	—	—	—	—	Non-album single
2019	"Rising Up"	–	–	—	—	—	–	—	—	—	—	—	—	Non-album single
2019	"Novruz Gəlir"	–	–	—	—	—	–	—	—	—	—	—	—	Non-album single
2019	"Məsafələr"	–	–	—	—	—	–	—	—	—	—	—	—	Non-album single
2019	"I'll Find A Way"	–	–	—	—	—	–	—	—	—	—	—	—	Non-album single
2019	"Bax Uçuram"	–	–	—	—	—	–	—	—	—	—	—	—	Non-album single
2020	"Until the End" (with VoColor)	—	—	—	—	—	—	—	—	—	—	—	—	Non-album single
2020	"Catch If You Fall"	—	—	—	—	—	—	—	—	—	—	—	—	Non-album single
2023	"Break Free"	–	–	—	—	—	–	—	—	—	—	—	—	

== See also ==
- Azerbaijani pop music
- Azerbaijani jazz

Awards and achievements
Preceded by (Germany) Lena with "Satellite"	Winner of the Eurovision Song Contest (with Nigar Jamal as duo Ell & Nikki); 2011	Succeeded by (Sweden) Loreen with "Euphoria"
Preceded by Safura Alizadeh with "Drip Drop"	Azerbaijan in the Eurovision Song Contest (with Nigar Jamal as duo Ell & Nikki); 2011	Succeeded by Sabina Babayeva with "When the Music Dies"
Preceded by (Germany) Anke Engelke, Judith Rakers and Stefan Raab	Eurovision Song Contest presenter (with Leyla Aliyeva and Nargiz Birk-Petersen); 2012	Succeeded by (Sweden) Petra Mede
