= Nigar Jamal =

Azerbaijani singer (born 1980)

Nigar Jamal Nigar Camal
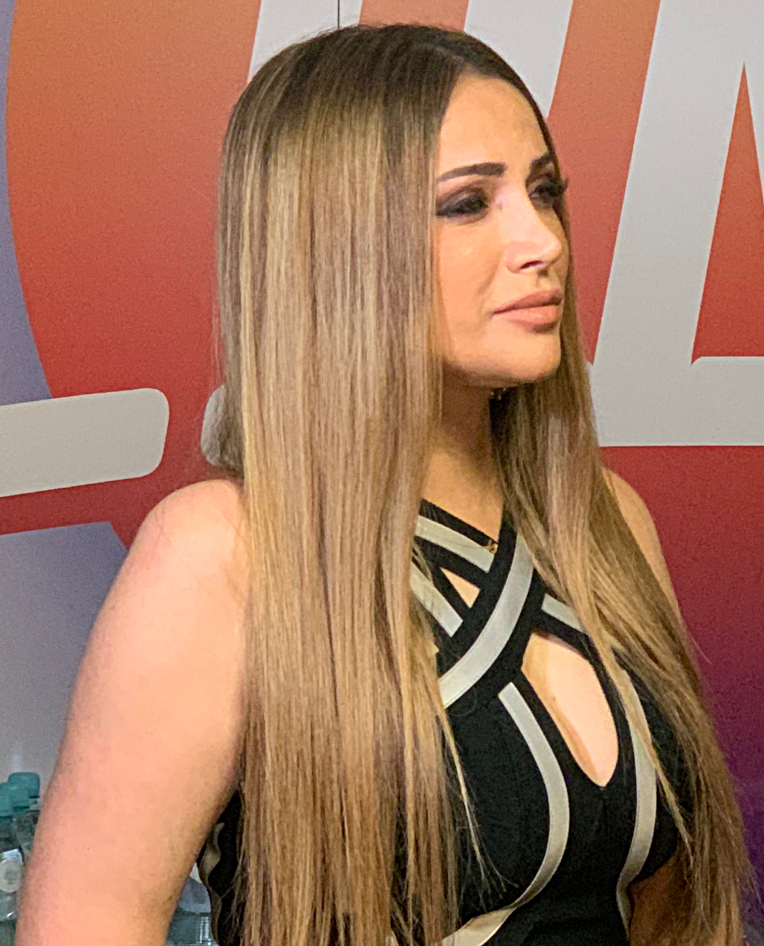
- Jamal in 2022

Background information
- Also known as: Nikki Jamal
- Born: Nigar Mutallibzadeh; 7 September 1980 (age 46); Baku, Azerbaijan SSR, Soviet Union
- Genres: Pop; R&B
- Occupation: Singer
- Years active: 2011–present
- Website: nigarjamal.net

Nigar "Nikki" Aydin qizi Jamal (Azerbaijani: Nigar Aydın qızı Camal, IPA: [niˈɟɑɾ ɑjˈdɯn ɡɯˈzɯ dʒɑˈmɑl]; née Mutallibzadeh [Mütəllibzadə, IPA: [mytæˈlibzɑdæ]]; born 7 September 1980) is an Azerbaijani singer. Born and raised in Baku, she has resided in London since 2005. She won the Eurovision Song Contest 2011 with Eldar Gasimov with the song "Running Scared". She and Gasimov have since performed as a duo on various occasions under the name Ell & Nikki.

== Early life ==
Jamal was born as Nigar Mutallibzadeh in Baku on 7 September 1980. In 1997, she entered Khazar University, majoring in economics and management, finishing 3 out of 4 years. Before trying herself as a singer, Nigar Jamal had been a housewife for five years. Jamal says she is inspired by the likes of Christina Aguilera, Alicia Keys, Brandy Norwood, Craig David and Chris Brown.

== Career ==
=== Eurovision Song Contest 2011 ===
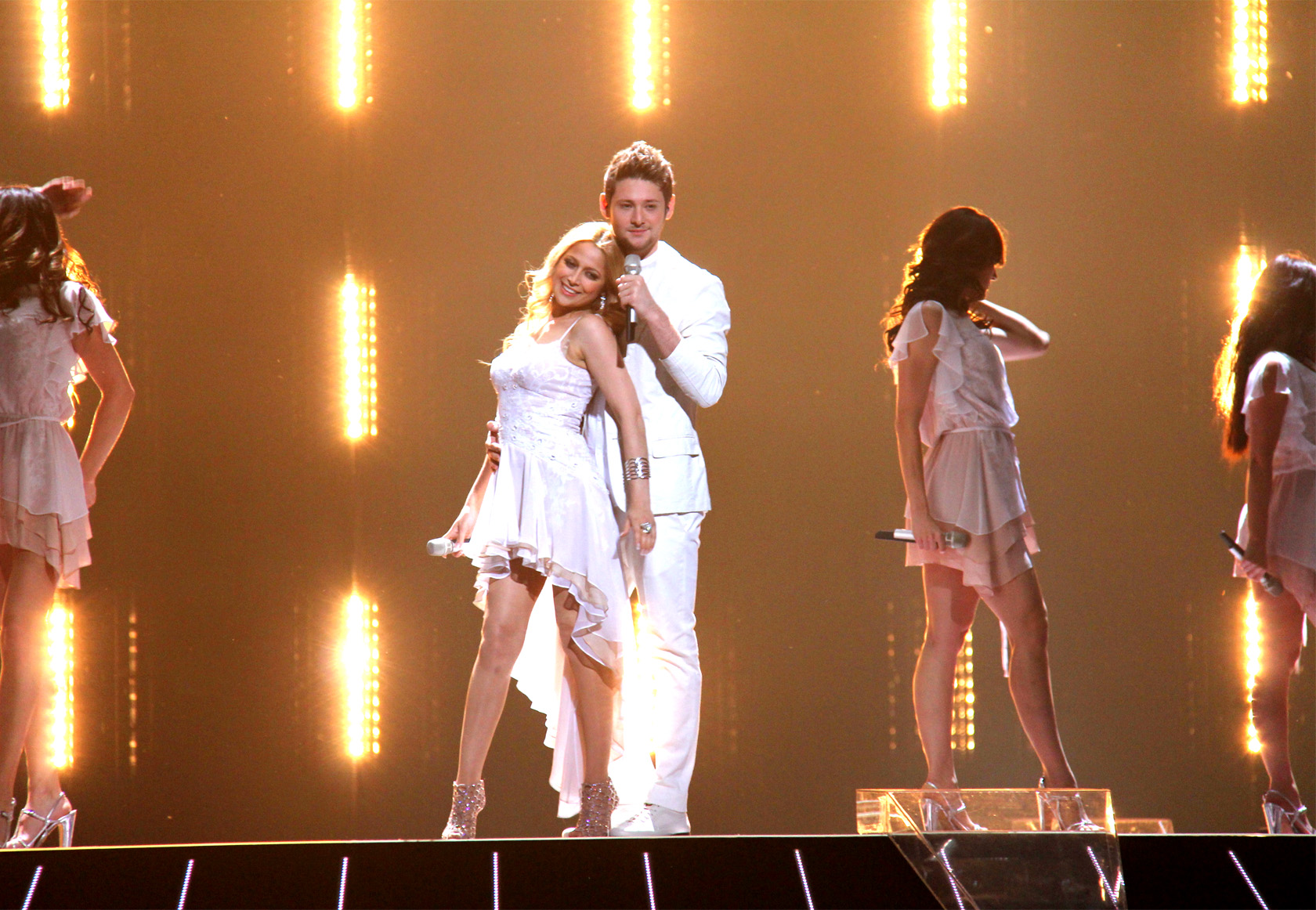
Nigar (left) and Eldar (right)

In December 2010, Jamal took part in the Azerbaijani national selection, Milli Seçim Turu 2011. Her first appearance was in Heat 7, placing joint first with 11 points, along with Ilhama Gasimova, both qualifying to the semi-final. Jamal qualified from the semi-final along with four other artists to the final on 11 February 2011, where she and Eldar Gasimov won the right to represent Azerbaijan at the Eurovision Song Contest 2011 in Düsseldorf, Germany in May 2011. They sang under the pseudonym Ell & Nikki the song "Running Scared" written by Stefan Örn and Sandra Bjurman from Sweden and Iain Farquharson from the UK, which won with a total of 221 points.

=== 2011–present: After Eurovision ===
After winning the Eurovision Song Contest 2011 Jamal and Gasimov got to travel to a number of countries and perform their winning entry. In Azerbaijan 15,000 postage stamps in the denomination of 1 Azerbaijani manat were printed. The production of postage stamps in Azerbaijan were in dedication of Eldar and Nigar's victory at the 2011 contest. In September 2011 it was announced that Nigar would appear in an episode of the Turkish comedy series Yahşi Cazibe.

In 2012, she was among five musicians from Azerbaijan chosen as the jury in the Danish national selection for their 2012 Eurovision contestant.

On 1 December 2011 Nikki presented her first post-Eurovision solo song and video clip "Crush on You". Other new material was released afterwards, including a duet with Miri Yusif entitled "Qal" ("Stay"); and another duet with Eurovision 2008 winner Dima Bilan entitled "Come Into My World".

On 11 August 2012, she released her debut album entitled "Play With Me". She has reportedly worked with Danish songwriter Boe Larsen for the album.

In early 2014, she was a judge in the Turkish television show X Factor.

== Discography ==
=== Albums ===
- 2014: Play With Me

=== Singles ===
Year	Single	Peak chart positions											Album
Year	Single	TUR	AUT	BEL (Vl)	GER	IRE	NL	ROM	RUS	SVK	SUI	UK	Album
2011	"Running Scared" (with Eldar Gasimov)	—	22	37	33	41	59	99	10	50	11	61	Play With Me
2011	"Crush On You"	—	—	—	—	—	—	—	—	—	—	—	Play With Me
2012	"Qal" ("Stay") (with Miri Yusif)	—	—	—	—	—	—	—	—	—	—	—	Non-album single
2012	"Come Into My World" (with Dima Bilan)	—	—	—	—	—	—	—	—	—	—	—	Play With Me
2012	"Play With Me"	—	—	—	—	—	—	—	—	—	—	—	Play With Me
2012	"One With The Music"	—	—	—	—	—	—	—	—	—	—	—	Play With Me
2012	"Sevdiyimə nifrət edirəm" ("I hate the one I love")	—	—	—	—	—	—	—	—	—	—	—	Non-album singles
2015	"Broken Dreams"	1	—	—	—	—	—	—	—	—	—	—	Non-album singles
2015	"Herhalde" feat. Berksan	—	—	—	—	—	—	—	—	—	—	—	Non-album singles

== See also ==
- British Azerbaijanis
- Azerbaijani ballet
- Azerbaijani pop music
- Azerbaijani jazz

Awards and achievements
Preceded by (Germany) Lena with "Satellite"	Winner of the Eurovision Song Contest (with Eldar Gasimov as duo Ell & Nikki); 2011	Succeeded by (Sweden) Loreen with "Euphoria"
Preceded by Safura Alizadeh with "Drip Drop"	Azerbaijan in the Eurovision Song Contest (with Eldar Gasimov as duo Ell & Nikki); 2011	Succeeded by Sabina Babayeva with "When the Music Dies"
