= Ilhama Gasimova =

Azerbaijani pop singer (born 1976)

- Also known as: Ilhama
- Born: May 24, 1976 (age 49); Bala Şürük, Azerbaijan SSR, Soviet Union
- Genres: Pop
- Occupation: singer
- Years active: 2005 – present
- Labels: Universal Music Group
- Website: www.ilhamaqas.com

Ilhama Gasimova (Azerbaijani: İlhamə Qasımova; born 1976, Bala Şürük, Lankaran Rayon, Azerbaijan) is an Azerbaijani pop singer.

== Early life ==
Ilhama Gasimova was born in the village of Bala Şürük and raised in Lankaran, where she graduated from school. She later obtained a degree in philology from Lankaran State University and worked as an Azeri language and literature teacher for two years. In 1999 she moved to Baku to defend a Master's dissertation, but problems of adaptation and financial difficulties forced her to abandon her plan and find an office job to make a living. Despite being musically gifted and citing singing as a childhood hobby, Ilhama Gasimova had not chosen to pursue a career in show business partly due to her parents opposing this choice.

== Music career ==
Ilhama Gasimova had no professional musical training when her coworkers persuaded her to sign up for the Baku Autumn song contest in 2000, where she won the first prize. Despite this success, Ilhama Gasimova remained sceptical about her possible career as a singer, stating in an interview that she had no financial means for self-promotion. However five years later she was once again persuaded to try herself as a contestant in the fourth season of the Azerbaijani Yeni Ulduz (2005—2006) song contest, where she competed alongside Aysel Teymurzadeh (who represented Azerbaijan in the Eurovision Song Contest later, in 2009) beating her in the final. This victory marked the beginning of Gasimova's professional singing career. In 2011, she advanced to the final of Azerbaijan's Eurovision 2011 national selection (from the same heat as Eurovision 2011 winner Nigar Jamal), but lost to the Ell & Nikki duo in the final, on 11 February. She then announced her plans to continue her career in Germany, where she later signed a contract with Universal Music.

In November 2011, Ilhama Gasimova released her first single Bei Mir Bist Du Sheen featuring DJ OGB, a modern version of the popular 1932 Yiddish song. The video clip for the song became the sixth most sold on iTunes. She announced her plans to release an album which would include remix versions of the songs from the 1930–50s. In 2012, she won an EMMAward for best video (Bei Mir Bist Du Sheen).

In January–February 2012, Ilhama Gasimova went on her first big tour and gave concerts in cities around Germany and Austria, including Vienna, Berlin, Karlsruhe, Fulda, Lübeck and Ludwigshafen.

== Personal life ==
In 1993 (when she was age 17), Ilhama Gasimova had an arranged marriage with a man who "loved her very much" but "belonged to a world different from hers." Gasimova soon ended this marriage, in part because she was unwilling to be "confined to a life as a housewife." Since 2009, she has been living with a common-law partner, 14 years her senior.
