= Farid Mammadov =

Azerbaijani singer (born 1991)

Fərid Məmmədov
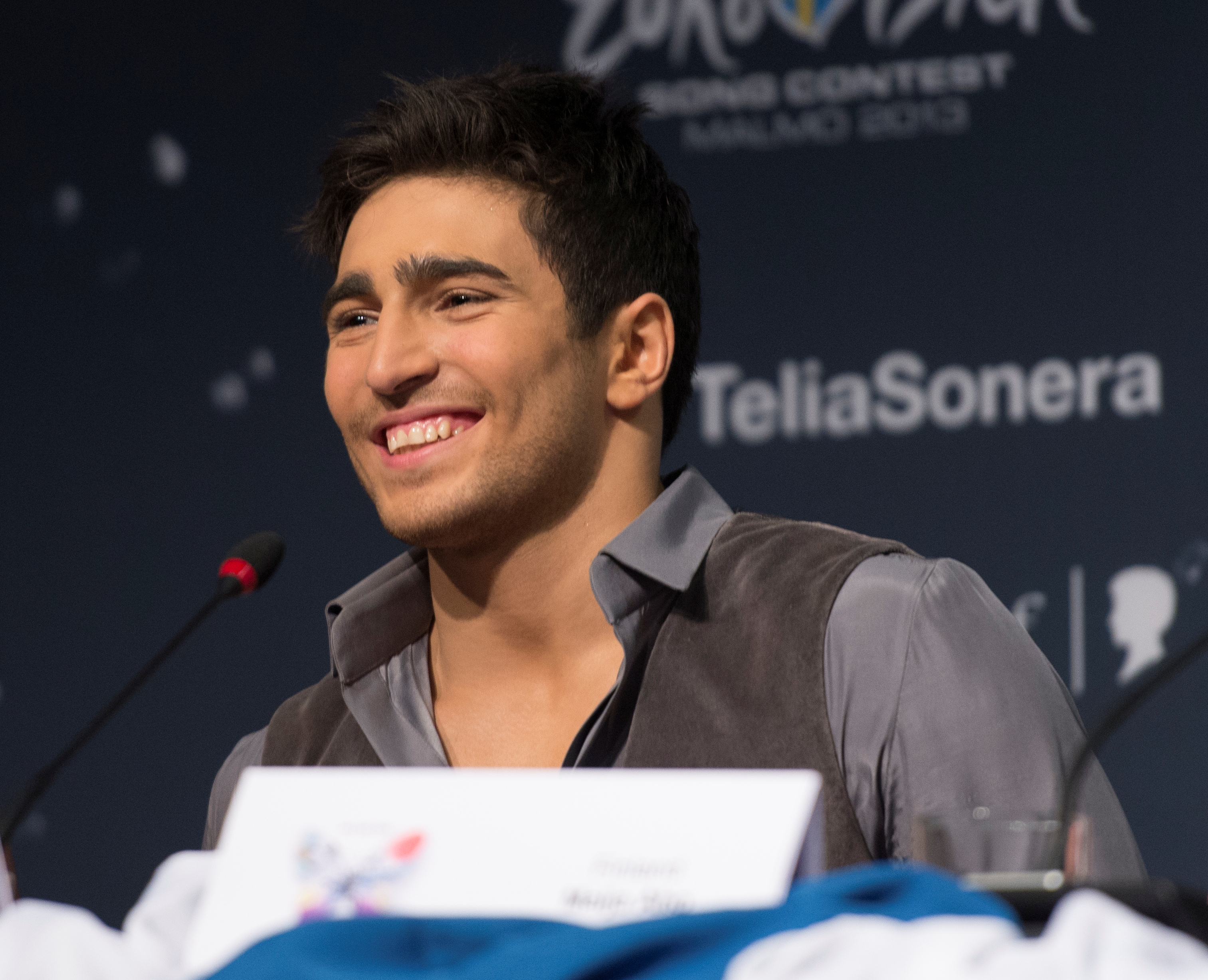
- Farid Mammadov at Eurovision Song Contest 2013 press conference

Background information
- Born: 30 August 1991 (age 34); Baku, Republic of Azerbaijan, USSR
- Origin: Azerbaijan
- Genres: pop, R&B, soul, jazz
- Occupation: singer composer sportsman
- Instrument: vocals
- Years active: 2000–present

Farid Mammadov (Azerbaijani: Fərid Məmmədov; born 30 August 1991 in Baku) is an Azerbaijani singer. He represented Azerbaijan in the Eurovision Song Contest 2013 in Malmö with the song "Hold Me" and came second after Denmark.

== Biography ==
=== Early life and career ===
Mammadov was born in Baku, to Asif Mammadov, a professional judoka and amateur rock musician, and Maya Mammadova, a silver-winning Soviet gymnast. Farid Mammadov studied at the Azerbaijan State University of Culture and Arts.

Since childhood, Mammadov sang in the Bulbul ensemble managed by Aybaniz Hashimova. For a long time, he was a soloist in this ensemble. He has been interested in soul and jazz since age 8 and cites Stevie Wonder as a major influence.

Mammadov is the author of Gal yanima (Come to Me), one of the songs which he performed during the Azerbaijani Eurovision selection tour.

Besides music, he also practices Greco-Roman wrestling and capoeira.

In 2013, he participated in the opening ceremony of the "Gold Grand Prix" international wrestling tournament

In 2015, he participated in the closing of the 1st European Games where he sang the national anthem of Azerbaijan with Sabina Babayeva

=== Eurovision ===
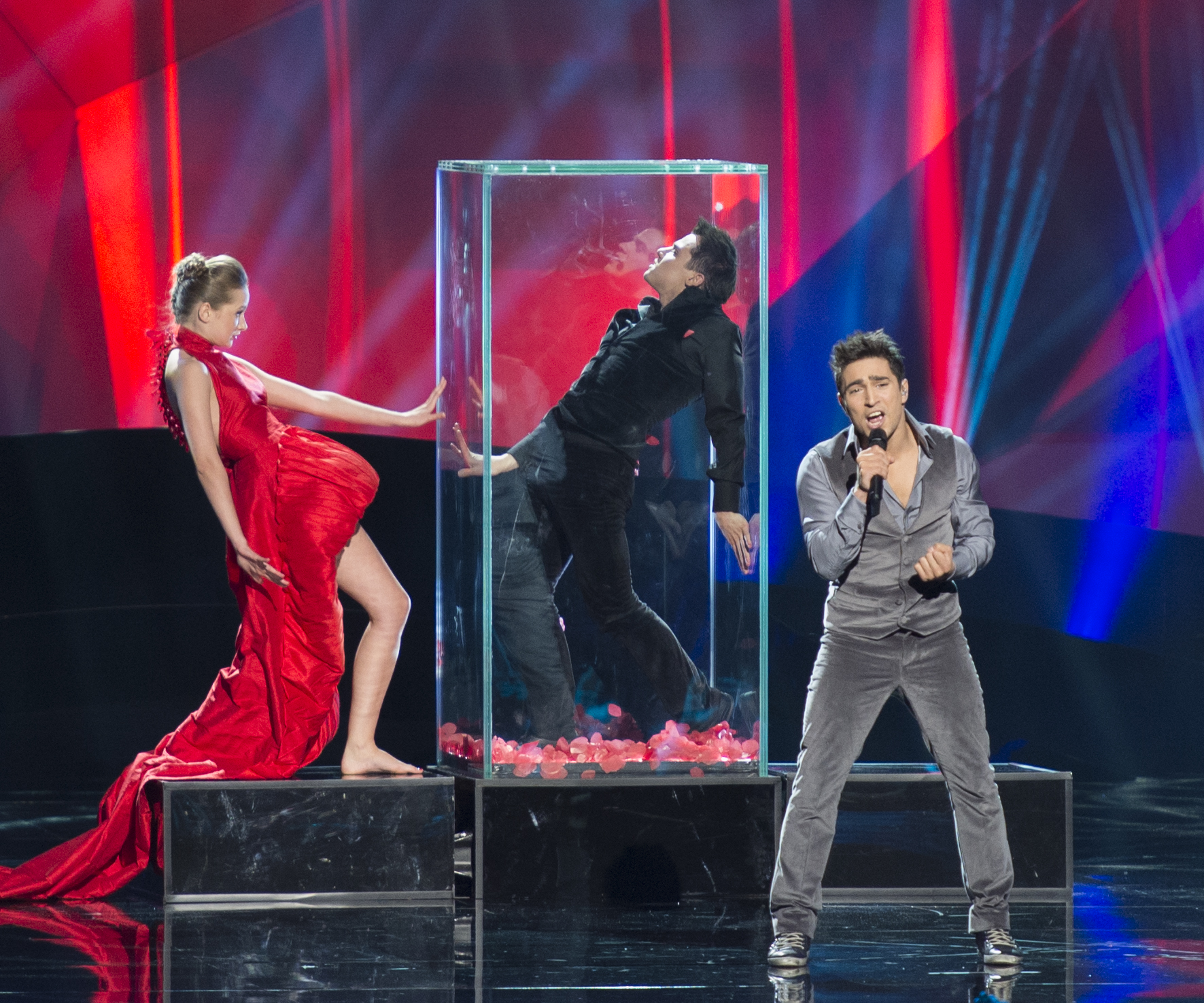
Farid Mammadov at Eurovision 2013

In March 2013 Farid won the Azerbaijani national final for the 58th annual Eurovision Song Contest 2013 which was held in Malmö, Sweden in May 2013. Mammadov was the first male solo singer to represent Azerbaijan in the contest. His performance was staged by Fokas Evangelinos, a Greek choreographer who directed the Eurovision performances of Sakis Rouvas and Ani Lorak. Azerbaijan placed 2nd in the 2013 competition, receiving ten 12-point scores and 234 points.

For the first time in the history of Azerbaijan's participation in the Eurovision Song Contest, he was awarded the Marcel Bezençon Artistic Award.

== Post-Eurovision ==
In April 2016, Farid Mammadov married a woman named Nigar in a private ceremony. The couple moved to Los Angeles, California, where their son was born in January 2019.

== Discography ==
=== Singles ===
Year	Title	Peak chart positions		Album
Year	Title	NL	SWI	Album
2012	"Gəl yanıma"	—	—	Non-album singles
2013	"İnan"	—	—	Non-album singles
2013	"Hold Me"	92	73	Non-album singles
"—" denotes release that did not chart or was not released.

Awards and achievements
Preceded by Sabina Babayeva with "When the Music Dies"	Azerbaijan in the Eurovision Song Contest; 2013	Succeeded by Dilara Kazimova with "Start a Fire"
