= Kosalar, Lankaran =

Kosalar
- Location within Azerbaijan
- Coordinates: 38°43′00″N 48°46′45″E
- Country: Azerbaijan
- Rayon: Lankaran
- Municipality: Bala Şürük
- Time zone: UTC+4 (AZT)
  - Summer (DST): UTC+5 (AZT)

Kosalar (also, Kasalar) is a village in the Lankaran Rayon of Azerbaijan. The village forms part of the municipality of Bala Şürük.
