= Elton Ibrahimov =

Elton Ibragimov
- Born: Elton Ibragimov; November 3, 1994 (age 31); Baku, Azerbaijan
- Origin: Azerbaijanian
- Genres: Pop, R&B
- Occupation: singer

Elton Ibragimov (рус. Элтон Ибрагимов; born November 3, 1994) is a singer and dancer who occupied second place in the national selection of Eurovision 2012 in Baku.

== Solo career ==
Elton Ibragimov passed a casting of national selection for the Eurovision 2012 in Baku, and was among 120 participants who took part in eliminations, subsequently entering into the top five. The final was in Heydar Aliyev Palace, on February 12, 2012, and there he took second place behind Sabina Babayeva. After that he recorded his first single under the name "Even if".

== Discography ==
=== Singles ===
"Even If" (2012) "You Know That" (2012) "She" (2014)

=== EPs ===
Luminary (2018)
