= Stefan Örn =

Swedish music composer and guitarist

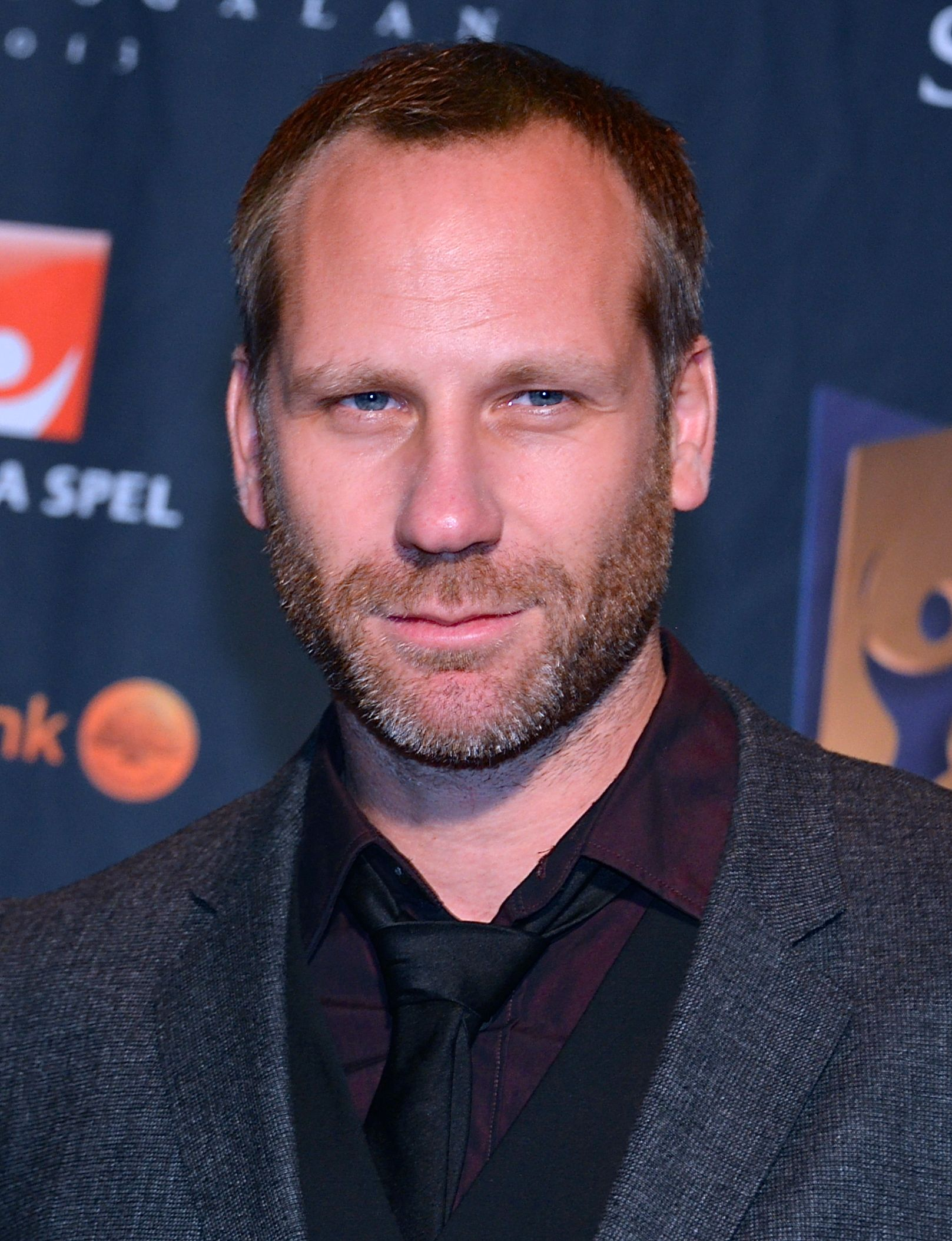
Stefan Örn

Stefan Örn (born 9 January 1975) is a Swedish music composer and guitarist. He is a member of the band Apollo Drive.

Örn was one of the composers of the songs which represented Azerbaijan in the Eurovision Song Contest in 2010 ("Drip Drop"), 2011 ("Running Scared"), 2012 ("When the Music Dies") and 2014 ("Start A Fire"). The 2011 entry won the contest that year. He also later worked on Montenegro's 2017 ESC song "Space".

In 2012, he worked with the Ukrainian superstar and Eurovision winner Ruslana for her international album My Boo! (Together!) being the co-author of the songs "Pop Up!" and "This is Euphoria". He also co-authored most of the songs from Anette Olzon's debut album, "Shine".

Örn grew up in Dalstorp and played with his two brothers in the football team Grimsås IF.
