= Kosalar, Aghdam =

Kosalar
- Location within Azerbaijan Location within Karabakh Economic Region
- Coordinates: 40°05′01″N 46°56′57″E
- Country: Azerbaijan
- District: Aghdam
- Time zone: UTC+4 (AZT)

Kosalar is a village in the Aghdam District of Azerbaijan.
