= Bala Şürük =

- Municipality
- Location within Azerbaijan
- Coordinates: 38°42′N 48°50′E
- Country: Azerbaijan
- Rayon: Lankaran

Population
  - Total: 1,476
- Time zone: UTC+4 (AZT)
  - Summer (DST): UTC+5 (AZT)

Bala Şürük (also, Bala-Şürük, Bala Shuryuk, and Malyy Shuryuk) is a village and municipality in the Lankaran Rayon of Azerbaijan. It has a population of 1,476. The municipality consists of the villages of Bala Şürük and Kosalar.
