= Running Scared (Ell & Nikki song) =

2011 song by Ell & Nikki

Single by Ell & Nikki
- Released: March 2011
- Recorded: 2011
- Genre: Pop
- Length: 2:59
- Composers: Stefan Örn; Sandra Bjurman; Iain James Farquharson
- Lyricists: Stefan Örn; Sandra Bjurman

Eldar Gasimov singles chronology
"Running Scared" (2011)	"Birlikdə nəhayət" (2012)

Nigar Jamal singles chronology
"Running Scared" (2011)	"Crush On You" (2011)

Music video
- "Running Scared" on YouTube

Eurovision Song Contest 2011 entry
- Country: Azerbaijan
- Artists: Eldar Gasimov; Nigar Jamal
- As: Ell & Nikki
- Language: English
- Composers: Stefan Örn; Sandra Bjurman; Iain James Farquharson
- Lyricists: Stefan Örn; Sandra Bjurman

Finals performance
- Semi-final result: 2nd
- Semi-final points: 122
- Final result: 1st
- Final points: 221

Entry chronology
- ◄ "Drip Drop" (2010)
- "When the Music Dies" (2012) ►

Official performance video
- "Running Scared" (Final) on YouTube

"Running Scared" is a song performed by Azerbaijani duo Ell & Nikki –Eldar Gasimov and Nigar Jamal– with music composed by Stefan Örn, Sandra Bjurman, and Iain James Farquharson, and lyrics written by Örn and Bjurman. It represented Azerbaijan in the Eurovision Song Contest 2011 held in Düsseldorf, resulting in the country's only ever win at the contest.

== Background ==
=== Conception ===
"Running Scared" was composed by Stefan Örn and Sandra Bjurman –from Sweden– together with Iain Farquharson –from the United Kingdom–, with lyrics by Örn and Bjurman. Örn and Bjurman are also authors of the song "Drip Drop", which represented Azerbaijan at the Eurovision Song Contest 2010.

=== National selection ===
From 15 November 2010 until 11 February 2011, Eldar Gasimov and Nigar Jamal competed in Milli Seçim Turu 2011, the national selection organised by İctimai Television (İTV) to select its performer for the 56th edition of the Eurovision Song Contest. They won the competition becoming the performers for Eurovision as the duo "Ell & Nikki".

İTV internally chose "Running Scared" for them from among seventy submissions coming from both Azerbaijan and abroad received within four weeks from 10 January 2011. The song was presented to the public on 14 March 2011 as the Azerbaijani entrant for Eurovision.

Gasimov stated that the song was a perfect common ground for the singers' varying styles, voices and spirits. Prior to its release, neither singer had performed in a duo. According to Gasimov, at the initial stage, both singers were unsure of the success of such a project.

=== Music video ===
The official videoclip for "Running Scared" was released on 11 April 2011 and was directed by Tarmo Krimm. It was preceded by a promotional video released earlier in March. Krimm, who was also the producer of the Eurovision Song Contest 2002 held in his native Estonia, won the right to direct this videoclip after submitting his proposal in February 2011.

The video was shot in southern Crimea, the videoclip features Ell taking photographs of Nikki as she appears sitting on a cliff with a Labrador Retriever and taking a ride on a cable car. These scenes are interrupted by shots of Ell and Nikki singing both separately and together. In the end, Ell is shown climbing up the cliff while Nikki looks at him tenderly, and the joined couple sings the final chorus standing face-to-face.

=== Eurovision ===
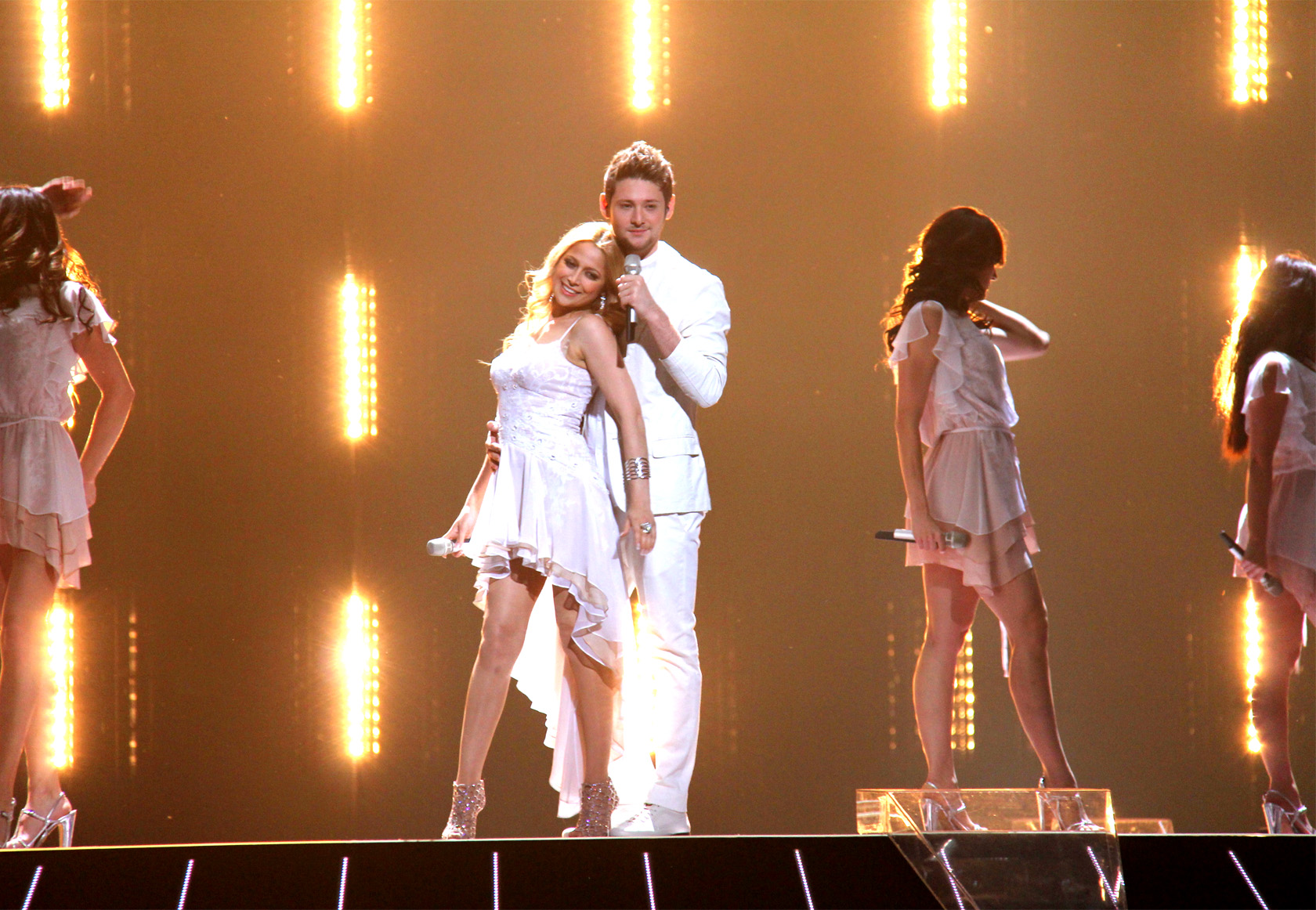
Ell & Nikki performing at Eurovision.

On 10 May 2011, the first semi-final of the Eurovision Song Contest was held in the Düsseldorf Arena in Düsseldorf hosted by Norddeutscher Rundfunk (NDR) on behalf of ARD and broadcast live throughout the continent. Ell & Nikki performed "Running Scared" eighteenth on the evening, following Lithuania's "C'est ma vie" by Evelina Sašenko and preceding Greece's "Watch My Dance" by Loukas Yorkas feat. Stereo Mike. After the grand final it was revealed that it had received in its semi-final 122 points, placing second in a field of nineteen and qualifying for the final.

On 14 May 2011, the grand final for the Eurovision Song Contest was held. Ell & Nikki performed again "Running Scared" nineteenth on the evening, following Austria's "The Secret Is Love" by Nadine Beiler and preceding Slovenia's "No One" by Maja Keuc.

At the close of voting it had received 221 points, placing first and winning the contest. Ell and Nikki were the first mixed-gender duo to win the contest since 1963 and the first winners from Azerbaijan. "Running Scared" set a new record for lowest average score on a Eurovision winner, earning 5.26 points per jury and breaking the previous record held by "My Number One" by Helena Paparizou, the 2005 winner.

== Chart history ==
=== Weekly charts ===
Chart (2011)	Peak position
Austria (Ö3 Austria Top 40)	22
Belgium (Ultratop 50 Flanders)	37
Belgium (Ultratip Bubbling Under Wallonia)	7
Germany (GfK)	33
Iceland (RÚV)	2
Ireland (IRMA)	41
Netherlands (Single Top 100)	59
Romania (Romanian Top 100)	99
Slovakia (IFPI)	50
Switzerland (Schweizer Hitparade)	11
UK Singles (OCC)	61

== Legacy ==
Acoustic and remix versions of the song were made by German DJ Azzido Da Bass in late April 2011.

Preceded by "Satellite" by Lena Meyer-Landrut	Eurovision Song Contest winners 2011	Succeeded by "Euphoria" by Loreen
