= Husniyya Maharramova =

Azerbaijani TV presenter and producer

Husniyya Maharramova Hüsniyyə Məhərrəmova
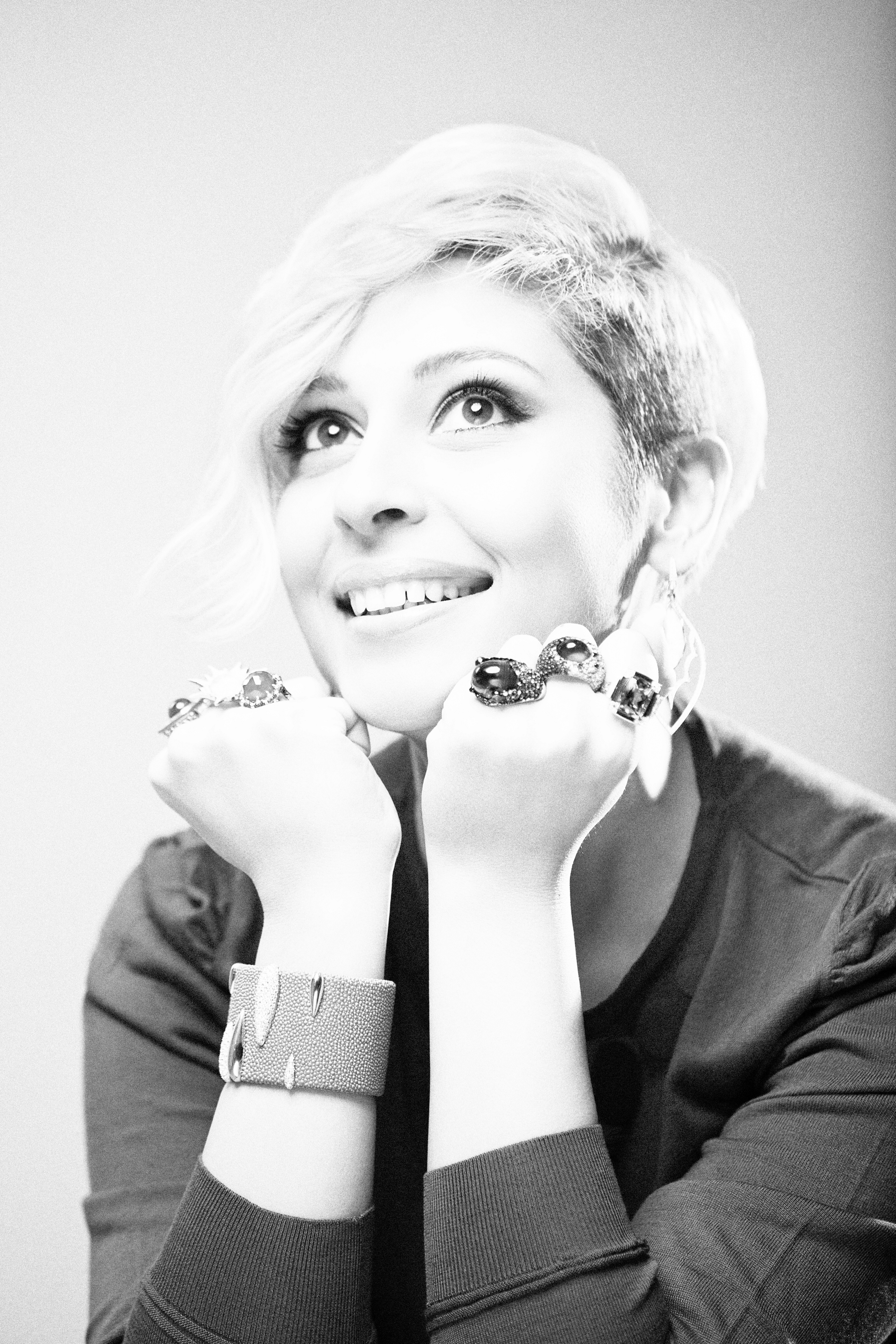
- Born: September 30, 1981 (age 43); Baku, Azerbaijan SSR, USSR
- Education: Azerbaijan State University of Culture and Arts; Baku Music Academy
- Occupation(s): Television host, producer
- Years active: 2005–present

Husniyya Ikram gizi Maharramova (Azerbaijani: Hüsniyyə İkram qızı Məhərrəmova, born September 30, 1981) is an Azerbaijani TV presenter, commentator, producer and former head of the Azerbaijani delegation of the Eurovision Song Contest.

== Biography ==
Husniyya Maharramova was born on September 30, 1981, in Baku. In 1987–1998, she studied at secondary schools No. 255 and 151 in Baku. She also studied piano at a music school. In 1999, she was admitted into the faculty of acting skills of the Azerbaijan State University of Culture and Arts, and after graduating in 2003, she entered the solo singing faculty of the Baku Music Academy and received her second higher education. In the same year, H. Maharramova participated in "Sing Your Song" contest and took the third place. At the same time, she continued her studies and received her master's degree in musicology.

During education years, Husniyya Maharramova changed her career to television presentation. In 2005, the year İctimai Television was launched, she passed the competition and hosted her first TV show a few days later. She worked here as a producer, deputy director of the department of musical and entertainment programs and presenter until May 2014.

In 2007–2008, Husniyya Maharramova worked at TRT Avaz, and from 2010 to 2014, she was the deputy director of the department of musical and entertainment programs of İctimai Television. Between the years 2014 and 2016, she was the executive director of a private company. In July 2019, she was appointed as the head of the international relations and protocol department of AzTV, and worked there until January 2020. Since 2020, Husniyya Maharramova has been working as a director and media director in a private sector.

Husniyya Maharramova was a member of Azerbaijani mission for the Eurovision Song Contest 2007, the host of the national selection for the debut of Azerbaijan in the contest in 2008, the point presenter at the Eurovision Dance Contest 2008 and the Eurovision Song Contest 2009. She was the commentator and reporter at the Eurovision Song Contest 2010, national commentator at the Eurovision Song Contest 2011, member of the international jury for the national entry selection of Malta's in 2012. She worked as a member of the organizing core team and coordinator of the Eurovision Song Contest 2012 held in Azerbaijan, as the head of the Azerbaijani delegation in 2012, 2013 and 2014, and as a producer and manager in 2015, 2016 and 2017. In 2019, she became the head of the Azerbaijani delegation again.

In 2008, Husniyya Maharramova married Samir Jafarov, a member of the "Coldunya" rock band. They have twins: a girl and a boy.

== Television activity ==
Husniyya Maharramova was the presenter and producer of a number of programs from 2005 to 2020:

Date	Name	TV channel	Role
2005	Muzexpress	İctimai Television	Presenter
2006–2010	Garage	İctimai Television	Presenter, producer
2007–2008	Winds from the Caucasus	TRT Avaz	Presenter
2010	Show N1	İctimai Television	Presenter, producer
2012	Eurasia Star	İctimai Television	Presenter
2013–2014	Fort Boyard	Azad Azerbaijan TV	Producer
2014	Big Stage	Azad Azerbaijan TV	Presenter, casting manager, producer
2016–2019	5th Element	Azad Azerbaijan TV	Presenter
2019–2020	The One AzTv	AzTV	Presenter

== Awards ==
- 2008 Prize of Congress of World Azerbaijanis (For contribution to the development of Azerbaijani art)
- "Uğur Zirvəsi" 2009 (For services in the field of television)
- Best TV Host and Best TV Commentator of 2008, 2009, 2010 by the Ministry of Youth and Sport, Main Department of Youth and Sports of the city of Baku and the All-Republican Youth Movement "İrəli" (For being the best role model for youth and the contribution to the development of a culture of Azerbaijan)
- Golden Palm Award 2019 (Best Female TV Presenter/Best Show Producer)
- Golden Woman Award 2022 (For the contribution to the art of Azerbaijan)
