= Sabina Babayeva =

Azerbaijani singer (born 1979)

Səbinə Babayeva
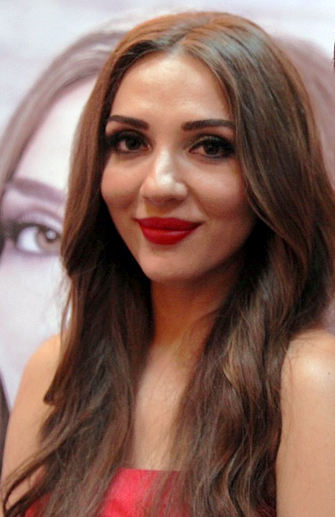
- Sabina Babayeva (2012)

Background information
- Born: 2 December 1979 (age 46); Baku, Azerbaijan SSR, Soviet Union
- Genres: Jazz, pop, soul
- Occupation: Musician
- Website: www.facebook.com/sabinababaeva/

Sabina Eldar gizi Babayeva (Azerbaijani: Səbinə Eldar qızı Babayeva; born 2 December 1979, Baku) is an Azerbaijani singer. She represented Azerbaijan in the grand final of the Eurovision Song Contest 2012, held in Baku, Azerbaijan on 26 May 2012, with the song "When the Music Dies", as the 13th act, and finished 4th overall.

== Eurovision Song Contest 2012 ==
Sabina Babayeva is a graduate of the Asaf Zeynally Music School in Baku with a degree in vocal arts. She has participated in a number of song competitions both in her country and abroad. She is known in Azerbaijan as the singer of Roya kimi, theme song of the 2003 Azerbaijani television series Bayaz hayat. She is a veteran contestant in the Azerbaijani national selection, she has applied to represent Azerbaijan in the Eurovision Song Contest every year since the country's debut in 2008. In 2011, she came third in her heat.

Prior to being selected, Sabina Babayeva recorded the song Sikhvarulis tamashi in duo with Anri Jokhadze who represented Georgia in the Eurovision Song Contest 2012.

As part of her promotional tour, Sabina performed in London, Amsterdam and Budapest. At Eurovision, she came in fourth, the highest rank for a host country contestant since the introduction of the semi-finals. She also received the Marcel Bezençon Press Award for her performance of "When the Music Dies".

== After Eurovision ==
In 2012, Babayeva was admitted to a post-secondary programme at the Baku Academy of Music.

In 2014, Babayeva was the spokesperson for the Azerbaijani voting for the Eurovision Song Contest 2014 in Copenhagen, Denmark. During the rehearsals, she refused to give 8 points to Armenia, repeatedly and incorrectly insisting that the points were for Greece. She would take this role again twelve years later for the 2026 contest in Vienna, Austria.

== Personal life ==
She considers Engelbert Humperdinck as one of her favourite singers and has expressed an interest in singing a duet with him.

On 30 July 2012, it was announced that Babayeva was engaged to Javidan Sharifov, six years her junior, a program director on Ictimai TV. The couple was reported to have been dating for a year. Sabina Babayeva refuted the claim but despite her initial reaction, the wedding did take place on 26 September. In early 2016, Babayeva gave birth to a son.

== Achievements and awards ==
- A laureate of 1st award in nomination for the best rendering of foreign song in local competition ”Wave” among musical institutions in 1999.
- A laureate of international contest of young vocal performers “Golden Hit’99”
- A Diploma for the participation in Charity Concerts dedicated to the International Day of Innocent Children victims of aggression and UN Program for the International year of Culture of Peace ‘2000.
- In 2002 was invited to the vocal department of LAMA (Los Angeles Music Academy)
- A laureate of the 1st premium of international festival dedicated to 55th years passed from World War
- A laureate of 1st premium in Republic Contest of young singers"Golden Key 2001”
- Grand-prix of International contest of young performers “Amberstar 2009” in Latvia – Stockholm
- A Grand-prix of International contest of young performers named “Slavic Star’2009”
- A performer of soundtrack “Like a Dream” in 10 parts “White Life” Movie .
- A soloist in Aypara music vocal instrumental group
- A soloist in Baku jazz club
- A soloist in musical “Noterdam De Pari“ 2010- 2011
- A representer of Azerbaijan at culture week in Paris ‘2011
- A representer of Azerbaijan at culture week in Washington’2013
- A representer of Azerbaijan at culture week in Cannes ‘2013
- A representer of Azerbaijan at culture week in Vilnius ‘2013
- A representer at Eurovision song contest 2012 (4-d place Azerbaijan) (video)
- Performed in a live concert in Moscow “Zaferano” club and Baku “11” club 2012
- A “Voice of the Year '2012” nomination given by the Azerbaijan Ministry of Youth and Sport
- A singer of the National Anthem at the first European games in Baku 2015
- A special guest at the closing ceremony of Islamic games 2017

== Discography ==
- Sabina Babayeva (2001) [1] [2]
- Roya kimi (OTS) - Sabina Babayeva (2003) [1] [2] [3] [4]
- Duets - Sabina Babayeva (2009) [1] [2]
- When the music dies - Sabina Babayeva (Eurovision-2012) [1] [2] [3] [4] [5] [6] [7] [8] [9]
- Retro - Sabina (2012) [1]
- Ey Azerbaycanim - Sabina Babayeva (2013) [1] [2]
- Geca - Sabina (2014) [1]
- Oceans away - Sabina Babayeva (2014) [1] [2] [3]
- Out Of Love - DJ AKG & Sabina Babayeva (2014) [1]

== See also ==
- Azerbaijani folk music
- Azerbaijani pop music
- Azerbaijani jazz

Awards and achievements
Preceded by Ell & Nikki with "Running Scared"	Azerbaijan in the Eurovision Song Contest; 2012	Succeeded by Farid Mammadov with "Hold Me"
