= Murad Arif discography =

Discography of Azerbaijani singer Murad Arif

- Studio albums: 5
- Authored songs: 70+

Murad Arif discography is the discography of Azerbaijani singer, songwriter, record producer and television personality Murad Arif. It includes his studio albums, songs written or co-written by him, and selected music videos.

== Studio albums ==
Year	Album	Language	Producer	Label	Genre	Collaborations
2014	Solo	Azerbaijani, Turkish, Russian	Murad Arif	mikpro	Pop, orient-pop	Natavan Habibi, Tunzala Aghayeva, Manana Japaridze, Iskender Paydash, Mirkelam
2018	Hitmaker	Azerbaijani, Turkish	Murad Arif	mikpro	Pop, orient-pop, jazz	Vagif Garayzadeh, Okaber, Gunel Zeynalova, Ramil Nabran, Dilara Kazimova, Elshad Khose
2021	Milli	Azerbaijani, Russian	Murad Arif	mikpro	Folklore, ashik music, Baku chanson, folk songs	Brilliant Dadashova, Dan Ulduzu ensemble
2024	Superstar	Azerbaijani	Murad Arif	mikpro	Pop, orient-pop, R&B	Aygun Kazimova, Sevda Alekbarzadeh, Mikayil Vakilov, Payam Turk
2025	Nostalgiya	Azerbaijani, Russian, Turkish	Murad Arif	mikpro	Retro music, classical estrada, waltz	Brilliant Dadashova, chamber orchestra

=== Solo ===
Solo is the first studio album by Murad Arif. It was released on 12 December 2014 by mikpro and consists of 16 tracks. The album followed Arif's transition to a performing career with the song "Həyat yoldaşımsan". It mostly consists of his own compositions and includes new versions of songs previously known through performances by other artists, such as Sevdiyini söylə, Bu şəhər ikimizə dar and Yeganə.

The album includes duets with Natavan Habibi, Tunzala Aghayeva and Manana Japaridze. It also contains a cover version of Tavla by Mirkelam and Iskender Paydash, as well as a cover version of Polad Bulbuloghlu's song Bakı. The arrangements were mainly prepared by Givi Usenashvili, Rashad Baghirov, Samir Shirinov and Joshgun Gadashov.

Several songs from the album received music videos. The video for Həyat yoldaşımsan was released in October 2014 and directed by Farhad Ali. In July 2016, Arif presented the music video for Dondurma, directed by Farid Yusifoglu. The music video for Partlat! was released in September 2017 and directed by Jalal Kangarli.

Track listing

No.	Title	Artist	Length
1.	"Həyat yoldaşımsan"	Murad Arif	3:30
2.	"Sevdiyini söylə"	Murad Arif, Natavan Habibi	3:14
3.	"Partlat!"	Murad Arif	3:15
4.	"İnşallah"	Murad Arif	3:16
5.	"Bu şəhər ikimizə dar"	Murad Arif	3:40
6.	"Sevgililər"	Murad Arif	4:11
7.	"Yeganə"	Murad Arif	3:49
8.	"Saçların"	Murad Arif	3:34
9.	"Tavla"	Murad Arif	4:24
10.	"Xəyanət etməyən kişi"	Murad Arif	3:31
11.	"Canavar"	Murad Arif	3:32
12.	"Ürəyimsən"	Murad Arif, Tunzala Aghayeva	3:57
13.	"Dondurma"	Murad Arif	3:09
14.	"Boom"	Murad Arif	3:17
15.	"Yaşasın sevənlər"	Murad Arif, Manana Japaridze	3:50
16.	"Bakı"	Murad Arif	3:14
Total length:			57:29

=== Hitmaker ===
Hitmaker was released on 5 July 2018 and consists of 17 tracks. The album includes songs such as Oppalara, Mənə sən lazımsan, Tufan, Qızım, Oğlum, Bossa Nova and Qələbə.

The album features collaborations with Ramil Nabran, Gunel Zeynalova, Dilara Kazimova, Okaber, Elshad Khose and Orkhan Nukha. Arif also recorded Bossa Nova, written by Vagif Garayzadeh. The arrangements were mainly prepared by Vagif Garayzadeh, Elvin Imanov, Givi Usenashvili and Rashad Baghirov.

Several songs from the album were released with music videos. The video for Qızım was presented in April 2018. The music video for Oppalara, performed by Murad Arif and Ramil Nabran, was released in May 2018. In June 2019, Arif presented Mənə sən lazımsan.

Track listing

No.	Title	Artist	Length
1.	"Bakı göz yaşlarına inanmır"	Murad Arif	3:14
2.	"Oppalara"	Murad Arif, Ramil Nabran	3:17
3.	"Mənə sən lazımsan"	Murad Arif	3:28
4.	"Tufan"	Murad Arif, Gunel Zeynalova	3:33
5.	"Yalnız səni gözlədim"	Murad Arif, Dilara Kazimova	3:32
6.	"Yaşamalı – Zərbəçi"	Murad Arif, Okaber	3:43
7.	"İçin-için"	Murad Arif	3:08
8.	"Qadan alaram"	Murad Arif, Ramil Nabran	3:17
9.	"Qızım"	Murad Arif	3:43
10.	"Oğlum"	Murad Arif	4:08
11.	"Şəkillər"	Murad Arif	4:10
12.	"Get iş tap işlə"	Murad Arif, Elshad Khose	3:19
13.	"Bossa Nova"	Murad Arif	3:30
14.	"Yaşa"	Murad Arif, Ramil Nabran	3:05
15.	"İçin-için" (remix)	Murad Arif, Orkhan Nukha	3:39
16.	"Sənə ehtiyacım var"	Murad Arif	4:28
17.	"Qələbə"	Murad Arif	3:12
Total length:			60:26

=== Milli ===
Milli was released on 29 March 2021 and consists of 18 tracks. The album consists of folk and composer songs, medleys, folklore material, ashik music and Baku chanson-style performances. It is one of Arif's album projects based mainly on songs not written by him.

The album includes national music material and medleys arranged in 6/8 rhythm. The arrangements were mostly prepared by Taleh Aghayev, Joshgun Gadashov and Ismayil Alizadeh. The album also includes collaborations with Brilliant Dadashova and the Dan Ulduzu ensemble.

Track listing

No.	Title	Artist	Length
1.	"Bəri bax"	Murad Arif	2:30
2.	"Gülə-gülə / Gözəllər / Dişlərin incidəndir" (medley)	Murad Arif	5:06
3.	"Biz mehriban ailəyik / Almanı atdım xarala / Toy mahnısı" (medley)	Murad Arif	8:28
4.	"Nə qaldı / Muleyli / Kəndimiz" (medley)	Murad Arif	8:30
5.	"Salam verək / Ruhani döndərməsi / Yaşıl ağacın altı" (medley)	Murad Arif	7:55
6.	"Qəmərim / Məhəbbətin qüdrəti / Nazı yandırdı" (medley)	Murad Arif	8:31
7.	"Tello / Cilveloy / Qaraxal yar" (medley)	Murad Arif	7:30
8.	"Bilməm nə oldu / Yada sal məni / Nə pis şeydir məhəbbət" (medley)	Murad Arif	7:22
9.	"Самолет / Nurcana / Hop-stop" (medley)	Murad Arif	7:10
10.	"Bakının maralısan / Güldəstə / Nargilə" (medley)	Murad Arif	7:00
11.	"Ах эта свадьба"	Murad Arif	3:42
12.	"Bakı / Neftçilər / Ağacda alma" (medley)	Murad Arif	4:37
13.	"Müşfiqin yanında / Daşlı qala / Aman ovçu" (medley)	Murad Arif	6:08
14.	"Almırsan vecə / Ay xanım / Leylican" (medley)	Murad Arif	7:56
15.	"Ay mənim ürəyim"	Murad Arif, Brilliant Dadashova	2:57
16.	"Şən Azərbaycan"	Murad Arif, Dan Ulduzu ensemble	2:41
17.	"Ay dili-dili / Reyhani / O qara gözlərinin" (medley)	Murad Arif	6:50
18.	"Qarabağ (Anadır arzulara)"	Murad Arif	3:31
Total length:			1:48:24

=== Superstar ===
Superstar was released on 14 June 2024 by mikpro and consists of 12 tracks. The album contains pop, orient-pop and R&B songs.

The album includes Çalxala, performed with Aygun Kazimova; Superstar, a duet with Sevda Alekbarzadeh; and Şuşam, performed with Payam Turk. It also includes Arif's versions of Qara gözlər and Bilərsən, songs composed by Mikayil Vakilov. The music video for Çalxala was released in June 2023 and directed by Delee Orujlu.

Track listing

No.	Title	Artist	Length
1.	"Çalxala"	Murad Arif, Aygun Kazimova	3:15
2.	"Hər şeyim"	Murad Arif	3:37
3.	"Möhtəşəm"	Murad Arif	2:40
4.	"Brilyantlar" (oriental version)	Murad Arif	3:11
5.	"Superstar"	Murad Arif, Sevda Alekbarzadeh	2:59
6.	"Bilərsən"	Murad Arif	3:26
7.	"Qara gözlər"	Murad Arif	2:49
8.	"İstanbul"	Murad Arif	3:41
9.	"Eşqimi sönməyə qoymaram"	Murad Arif	3:18
10.	"Yaşa" (remix)	Murad Arif	2:46
11.	"Yaşamalı" (solo version)	Murad Arif	2:39
12.	"Şuşam"	Murad Arif, Payam Turk	3:58
Total length:			38:19

=== Nostalgiya ===
Nostalgiya was released on 5 September 2025 by mikpro and consists of 10 tracks. Recorded with a chamber orchestra, the album was prepared in retro music, classical estrada and waltz styles. It consists of Arif's versions of well-known twentieth-century songs.

The album includes songs associated with composers such as Elza Ibrahimova, Andrey Babayev, Nushaba Muradova and Emin Sabitoghlu. Most of the arrangements were prepared by pianist Nargiz Aliyeva. The album also includes Təşəkkür, a duet with Brilliant Dadashova written by Murad Arif.

Track listing

No.	Title	Artist	Length
1.	"Nazəndə sevgilim"	Murad Arif	2:48
2.	"Mehribanım"	Murad Arif	2:44
3.	"İntizar (Vəfadarım)"	Murad Arif	4:08
4.	"Я встретил девушку"	Murad Arif	2:45
5.	"Uzaq yaşıl ada"	Murad Arif	2:44
6.	"Samanyolu (Bir şarkısın sen)"	Murad Arif	3:31
7.	"Qurban verərdim"	Murad Arif	4:02
8.	"Песня первой любви, Sevgilim, Необыкновенные глаза" (medley)	Murad Arif	4:43
9.	"Bana ellerini ver"	Murad Arif	3:08
10.	"Təşəkkür"	Murad Arif, Brilliant Dadashova	3:19
Total length:			33:52

== Authored songs ==
Year	Artist	Song
2008	Ayaz Gasimov	Almalarınla
2008	Khayyam Nisanov	İstanbul
2008	Elnara Khalilova	Ay qız oyan
2009	Natavan Habibi and Intizar	Sevdiyini söylə
2009	Aygun Kazimova	Şou № 1
2009	Khayyam Nisanov	İstidir
2009	Ayaz Gasimov	Şokolad
2009	Aygun Rahimova	Məni dəli kimi sevən adam
2009	Faig Aghayev	Bal kimi
2010	Tunzala Aghayeva and Khayyam Nisanov	Ürəyimsən
2010	Khayyam Nisanov	Boom
2010	Natavan Habibi	Təyyarələr
2011	Natavan Habibi	Stop
2011	Zamiq Huseynov	O mənə inanır
2011	Nadir Gafarzadeh	Rakkada-çıkkada
2012	Natavan Habibi	Damlalar
2012	Rashad Ilyasov	Adrenalin
2012	Roza Zargarli	Atəş
2012	Khayyam Nisanov	Bakı-Moskva
2012	Nil Karaibrahimgil	Ay kız uyan
2012	Faig Aghayev	Riyaziyyat
2012	Ziynet Sali	İstanbul
2013	Natavan Habibi	Sən məni başa düşmürsən niyə
2013	Fagan Safarov	Xəstə
2013	Ayaz Gasimov	Mən səni öldürdüm
2014	Zamiq Huseynov	Yeganə
2014	Nura Suri	Brilliantlar
2014	Ilhama Gasimova	Seni seviyorum
2014	Roya	Ona nə var ki
2014	Murad Arif	Həyat yoldaşımsan
2014	Zulfiyya Khanbabayeva and Abbas Baghirov	Xoşbəxt olun
2015	Roya and Khayyam Nisanov	Sənə ehtiyacım var
2015	Roza Zargarli	Şirin çay
2016	Fuad Dadashov	Şəkillər
2016	Enbe Orkestrası, Ziynet Sali and Khayyam Nisanov	İstanbul
2016	Abbas Baghirov	Safiyə
2016	Murad Arif	Sevgililər
2016	Murad Arif	Dondurma
2016	Manana Japaridze and Murad Arif	Yaşasın sevənlər
2017	Aygun Mammadli	İkimiz
2017	Natavan Habibi	Sənə
2017	Murad Arif	Saçların
2017	Murad Arif	Partlat!
2018	Murad Arif and Dilara Kazimova	Yalnız səni gözlədim
2018	Murad Arif	Qızım
2018	Murad Arif and Ramil Nabran	Oppalara
2019	Murad Arif and Gunel Zeynalova	Tufan
2020	Murad Arif	Oğlum
2020	Murad Arif and Ramil Nabran	Qadan alaram
2020	Murad Arif and Elshad Khose	Get iş tap işlə
2020	Murad Arif	Şəkillər
2020	Murad Arif	Qələbə
2021	Murad Arif and Okaber	Yaşamalı
2021	Murad Arif	Bakı göz yaşlarına inanmır
2021	Murad Arif	İçin-için
2022	Murad Arif and Brilliant Dadashova	Təşəkkür
2022	Murad Arif and Ramil Nabran	YAŞA!
2022	Murad Arif	Hər şeyim
2022	Murad Arif	İstanbul
2023	Murad Arif	Brilyantlar (oriental version)
2023	Murad Arif and Aygun Kazimova	Çalxala
2023	Roya	Şükür edirəm
2023	Murad Arif and Payam Turk	Şuşam
2024	Murad Arif and Sevda Alekbarzadeh	Superstar
2024	Murad Arif and Jay Aliyev	O qızın adı nədir
2025	Murad Arif and Roya	Bumeranq
2025	Murad Arif and Roya	Ona nə var ki?
2025	Murad Arif	Brilyantlar (remix)
2026	Roya	Ayrılan adamlar
2026	Murad Arif and Brilliant Dadashova	Cin atı
2026	Murad Arif and Orkhan Zeynalli	Üzr
2026	Murad Arif	HOQQA
2026	Murad Arif	Səni unuda bilmirəm
