= Murad Arif =

Azerbaijani singer (born 1981)

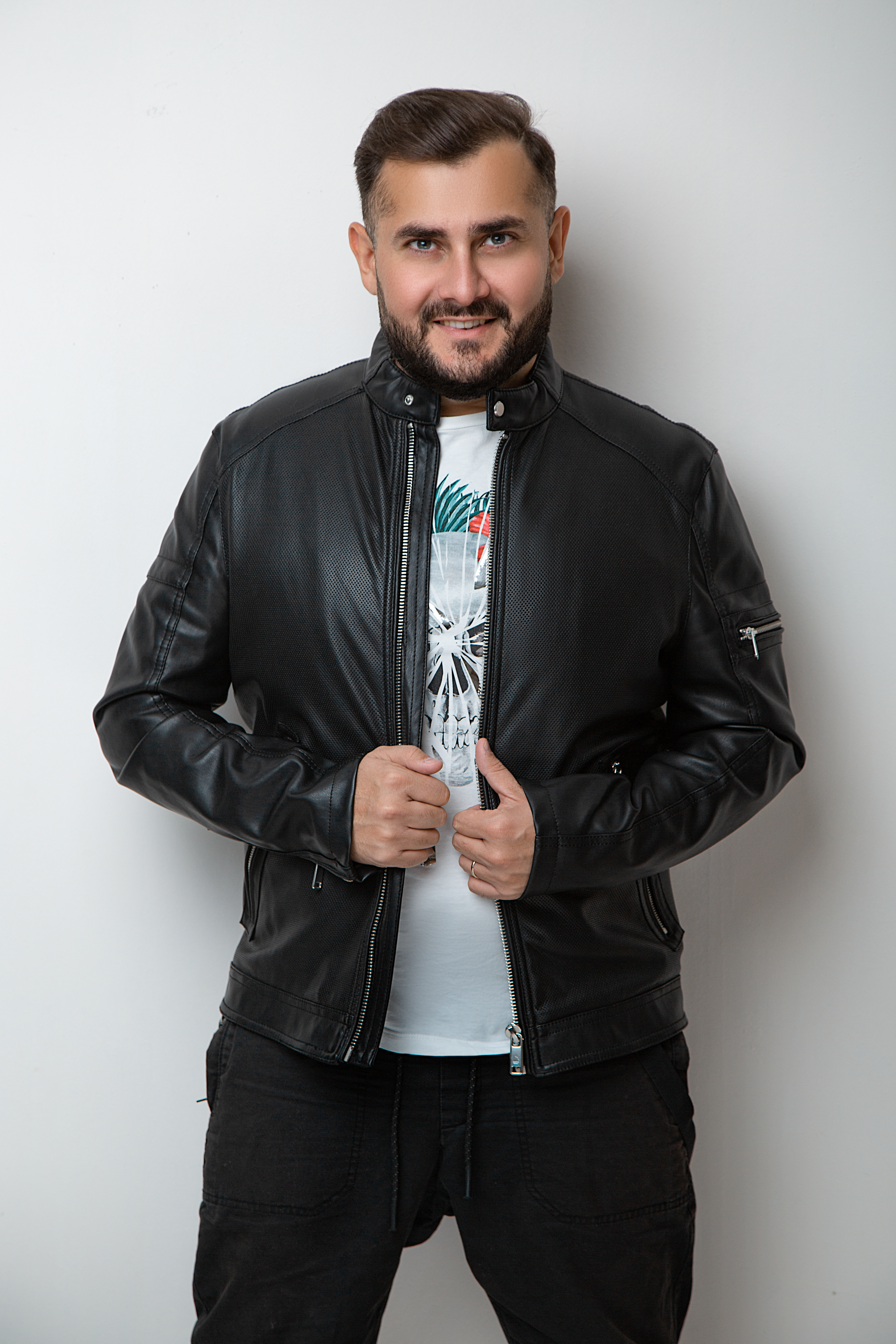

Background information
- Also known as: Hitmaker
- Born: Murad Şükür Arif oğlu 27 September 1981 (age 44); Sumgait, Azerbaijan SSR, Soviet Union
- Genres: pop; dance-pop; R&B; jazz; folk; Azerbaijani estrada
- Occupations: singer; composer; record producer; showman; journalist
- Years active: 2002–present

Murad Arif oghlu Shukur (Azerbaijani: Murad Arif oğlu Şükür; born 27 September 1981), known professionally as Murad Arif, is an Azerbaijani singer, songwriter, record producer, showman and journalist. Azerbaijani media have referred to him as a "Hitmaker". He has held solo concerts in major concert venues in Azerbaijan and has appeared as a coach or panel member in Azerbaijani editions of international television formats, including The Voice and Masked Singer.

== Biography ==
Murad Arif was born on 27 September 1981 in Sumgait, in the family of cultural worker Arif Shukurov (1936–2019) and biologist Sanubar Shukurova (born 1949). His paternal family is originally from Fuzuli, while his maternal family is from Shusha. He has two sisters and is the brother of television presenter Konul Arifgizi.

Arif studied at secondary schools No. 15 and No. 28 in Sumgait, as well as at the Istedad (lit. 'Talent') lyceum. He graduated from the Faculty of International Economic Relations. He married in 2011. His son Mikayil was born in 2012, and his daughter Ayla was born in 2015.

== Television career ==
After completing higher education, Arif did not continue a career in economics. In 2002, he worked at Radio Space 104 FM. He later worked as a DJ at 104 FM, Lider Jazz FM, İctimai Radio and Day.AZ Radio.

Together with Leyla Guliyeva, Arif was one of the first Azerbaijani commentators of the Eurovision Song Contest 2006. His first television programme as a presenter was Qaraj, broadcast on İctimai Television in 2006 and co-hosted with Husniyya Maharramova. In 2007, he participated in Murad Dadashov's television project Mashin show and won the competition.

He later presented the programmes Yeni Səhər (lit. 'New Morning') and Solo on Lider TV, as well as Gün keçir (lit. 'The Day Passes') on ATV. In 2008, he prepared a series of programmes for the Montreux Jazz Festival in Switzerland. He commentated on the opening ceremony of the 2010 FIFA World Cup and the international music competition 5 Звезд (lit. 'Five Stars'). In 2014, he served as a judge in the music competition Böyük səhnə (lit. 'Big Stage') and supported Dilara Kazimova during the Azerbaijani national selection for the Eurovision Song Contest 2014.

In 2018, Arif left Lider TV and launched his author project Popumuz Var! (lit. 'We Have Pop!'), an online interview programme focused on music and show business. Arif commentated for Azerbaijan at the Eurovision Song Contest in 2006, 2019, 2021 and 2022.

He was selected as a coach in The Voice Kids Azerbaijan in 2020 together with Zulfiyya Khanbabayeva and Chingiz Mustafayev, and in 2021 joined The Voice Azerbaijan as a coach alongside Brilliant Dadashova, Tunzala Aghayeva and Eldar Gasimov. In 2023, he appeared as a detective panel member in the Azerbaijani version of Masked Singer, together with Faig Aghayev, Nigar Jamal, Kamila Babayeva and Joshgun Rahimov. He returned to The Voice Azerbaijan in 2025 as a coach, alongside Zulfiyya Khanbabayeva, Roya and Eldar Gasimov, and in 2026 again appeared as a detective panel member in Masked Singer with Faig Aghayev, Nigar Jamal, Kamila Babayeva and Joshgun Rahimov.

== Music career ==
For a long time, Arif worked as a record producer for Ayaz Gasimov, Khayyam Nisanov, Yashar Jalilov and Elton Huseynaliyev. He began working as a songwriter in 2008 and presented the song "Almalarınla" (lit. 'With Your Apples') to Ayaz Gasimov that year. After the song was broadcast, it gained popularity in Azerbaijan. Following this, Arif collaborated with a number of Azerbaijani performers, including Natavan Habibi, Aygun Kazimova, Roya, Tunzala Aghayeva, Sevda Alakbarzadeh, Faig Aghayev and others, writing songs for them.

In 2009, his song "Sevdiyini söylə" (lit. 'Tell that You Love'), performed by Intizar and Natavan Habibi, won the Bakı Gecələri (lit. 'Baku Nights') competition organised by the Ministry of Culture of Azerbaijan. In 2011, Natavan Habibi performed "Təyyarələr" (lit. 'Airplanes'), written and composed by Arif, at the Turkcevizyon Muzik Festivali 2011, a festival of Turkic-speaking countries held in Denizli, Turkey.

Songs written by Arif have been used, with official permission, by Turkish artists including Nil Karaibrahimgil, Ziynet Sali and DJ Suat Ateşdağlı, who included them in their albums. Some of his songs have also been used without official permission by performers in Kazakhstan, Uzbekistan and Russia.

In 2014, Arif began his solo career by performing his own songs. His early solo releases included Həyat yoldaşımsan (lit. 'You Are My Spouse'), İnşallah" and "Saçların (lit. 'Your Hair'). In 2018, his song Oppalara became one of his better-known solo works.

On 5 December 2019, Arif held a solo concert titled Tufan (lit. 'Storm') at Elektra Hall in Baku. On 19 May 2023, he held his first major solo concert, SOLO, at the Heydar Aliyev Palace. His second concert at the same venue, titled HITMAKER, was held on 23 May 2024. On 30 September 2025, he held his third solo concert, titled 3:0.

== Discography ==
- Solo (2014)
- Hitmaker (2018)
- Milli (2021)
- Superstar (2024)
- Nostalgiya (2025)

Murad Arif is also the author of more than 70 songs. For a list of these songs, see: songs authored by Murad Arif.
