= The Voice of Azerbaijan =

Azerbaijani television singing competition

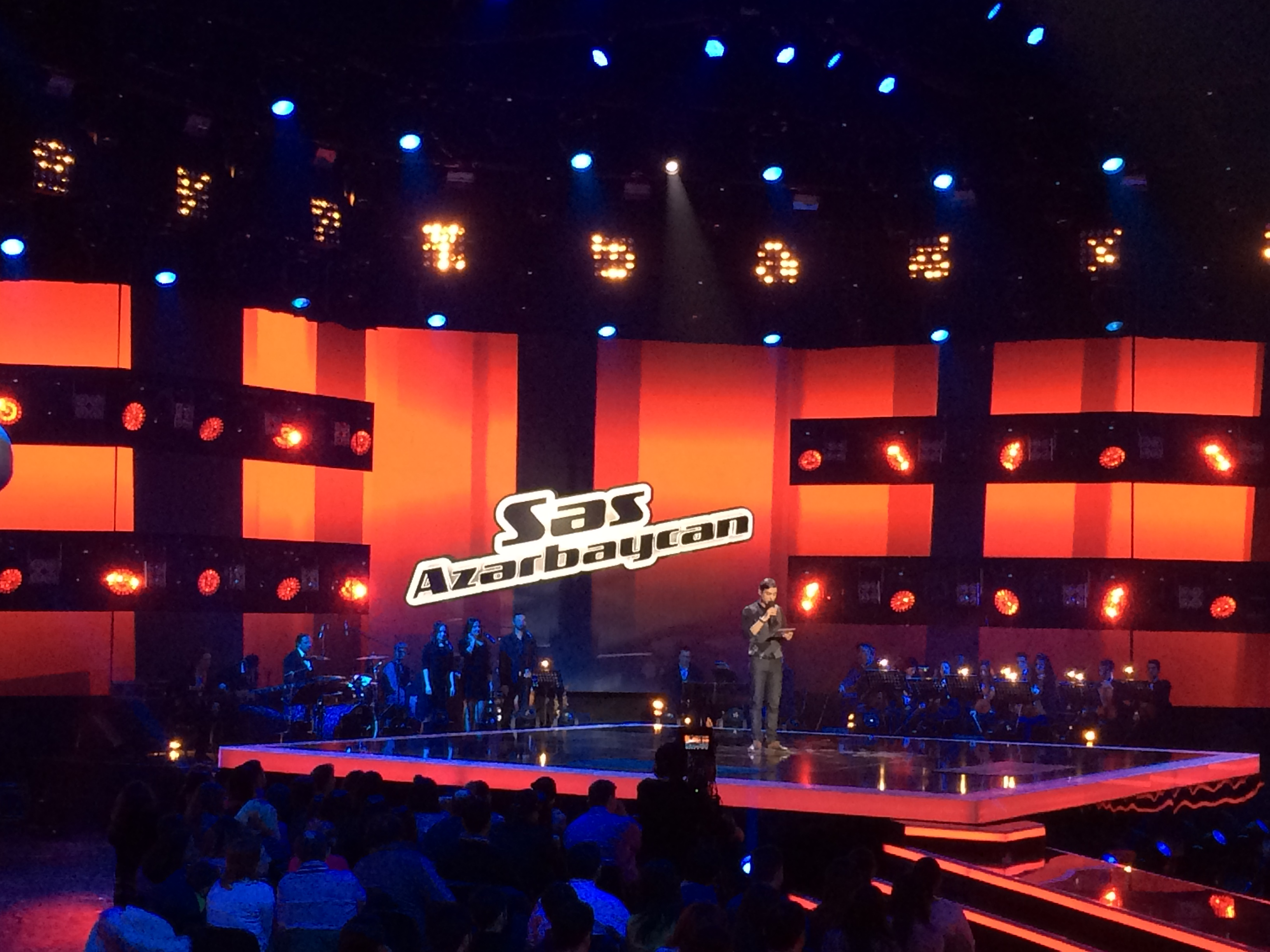
- Azerbaijani: Səs Azərbaycan
- Genre: Reality television
- Created by: John de Mol
- Judges: Faig Aghayev; Manana Japaridze; Mübariz Tağiyev; Tünzale Ağayeva; Murad Arif; Brilliant Dadashova; Eldar Gasimov; Zulfiyya Khanbabayeva; Röya
- Country of origin: Azerbaijan
- Original language: Azerbaijani
- No. of seasons: 3

Production
- Production locations: Baku, Azerbaijan
- Production companies: Talpa (2015-2016); ITV Studios (2021-present)

Original release
- Network: AzTV
- Release: 13 November 2015 – 5 March 2016
- Network: İctimai Television
- Release: 8 October 2021 – present

The Voice of Azerbaijan (Azerbaijani: Səs Azərbaycan) is an Azerbaijani television singing competition created by John de Mol. The first season was broadcast on AzTV. The show premiered in late 2015 continuing to 2016. The rules of the show were based on The Voice of Holland. The show received a reboot for the second season that was scheduled to premiere on October 8, 2021.

== Series overview ==
Team Faiq
Team Manana
Team Mübariz
Team Tünzale
Team Murad
Team Brilliant
Team Eldar
Team Zulfiyya
Team Röya

Season	First aired	Last aired	Winner	Runner-up	Third place	Fourth place	Winning coach	Presenter	Coaches (chair's order)				Network
Season	First aired	Last aired	Winner	Runner-up	Third place	Fourth place	Winning coach	Presenter	1	2	3	4	Network
1	13 Nov 2015	4 Mar 2016	Emiliya Yaqubova	Samira Efendiyeva	Samra Rahimli	Hüseyn Abdullayev	Mübariz Tağiyev	Tural Asadov	Faiq	Manana	Mübariz	Tünzale	AzTV
2	8 Oct 2021	28 Jan 2022	Nadir Rustamli	Emil Tağıyev	Leyla Izzetova	Hidayat Aliyev	Eldar Gasimov	Azer Suleymanli	Murad	Brilliant	Tünzale	Eldar	İctimai Television
3	9 Feb 2025	25 May 2025	Jamila Hashimova	Ilqar Bakirov	Sanat Asuat	Fuad Mehdiyev	Röya	Azer Suleymanli	Murad	Zulfiyya	Röya	Eldar	İctimai Television

Coaches' timeline
Coach	Season		
Coach	1	2	3
Tünzale Ağayeva			
Manana Japaridze			
Mübariz Tağıyev			
Faig Aghayev			
Eldar Gasimov			
Murad Arif			
Brilliant Dadashova			
Zulfiyya Khanbabayeva			
Röya			

== Season 3 ==
=== Episode 1 (Feb. 9) ===
Order	Artist	Song	Coach's and contestant's choices			
Order	Artist	Song	Murad	Zülfiyyə	Röya	Eldar
1	Fuad Mehdiyev	"Lose Control"	✔	✔	✔	✔
2	Çingiz Mustafayev	"Dönmə Geri"	—	—	—	—
3	Məlahət Mirzəyeva	"Bana Bana Gəl"	—	—	✔	✔
4	İrina Mityanes	"Cambio Dolor"	—	—	—	—
5	Sübhan Rüstəmov	"When Will I See You Again"	✔	—	—	—
6	Selcan Adıgözəlli	"Xatırla Məni"	—	—	—	—
7	Sanat Asuat, Kazakhstan	"Run to You"	—	✔	✔	✔
8	Şəhanə Rzayeva	"Flowers"	—	✔	—	—
9	Teymur Hənifəyev	"La La La"	✔	✔	✔	✔

=== Episode 2 (Feb. 16) ===
Order	Artist	Song	Coach's and contestant's choices			
Order	Artist	Song	Murad	Zülfiyyə	Röya	Eldar
1	Tais Saka, Turkey	"Who's Lovin' You"	✔	✔	✔	✔
2	Nofəl Aslanov	"Ay Gecikən Məhəbbətim"	✔	✔	✔	—
3	Elmira Atapour, Iran	"I Wish You Love"	—	'✔	✔	—
4	Ayaz Ömərli	"Beggin'"	—	—	—	—
5	Mövsüm Salamzadə	"Şükriyyə"	—	—	—	—
6	Nigar Tağıyeva	"Shallow"	—	—	—	✔
7	İlqar Bəkirov	"Skate"	—	✔	—	—
8	Lalə Qafarova	"Sanki Buz"	—	—	—	—
9	Rüstəm Sadıqlı	"Pəncərəmə qondu çiçək"	✔	—	✔	✔
10	Babək Əfəndi	"Writing's on the Wall"	✔	✔	✔	✔

=== Episode 3 (Feb. 23) ===
Order	Artist	Song	Coach's and contestant's choices			
Order	Artist	Song	Murad	Zülfiyyə	Röya	Eldar
1	Sərvər Yılmaz	"Cake by the Ocean"	—	—	—	—
2	Elnur İsgəndərov	"Mənim-Mənim"	✔	✔	✔	—
3	Piri Əliyev	"Gözümün içinə bax"	—	—	—	—
4	Mehinbanu Bayramlı	"Dernière danse"	—	✔	—	✔
5	Nigar Qasımova	"Apar məni"	—	✔	✔	—
6	Zərinə Rəhimova	"I See Red"	✔	✔	✔	✔
7	Nəzrin Rəcəbzadə	"All I Ask"	—	—	—	✔
8	Leyla İbrahimova	"I Surrender"	—	✔	—	—
9	Ariz Nəbiyev	"O gözlər"	—	—	—	—
10	Tamari Kavtaradze, Georgia	"All by Myself"	✔	✔	✔	✔

=== Episode 4 (Mar. 2) ===
Order	Artist	Song	Coach's and contestant's choices			
Order	Artist	Song	Murad	Zülfiyyə	Röya	Eldar
1	Jamila Hashimova	"I Have Nothing"	✔	✔	✔	✔
2	Kənan Mansurzadə	"Clocks"	—	—	—	—
3	Elnarə Kazımova	"Venus"	✔	✔	✔	—
4	Ruslan Zuyev	"Since You Been Gone"	✔	—	—	✔
5	İsmayıl Əsədli	"Ey Vətən"	—	—	—	—
6	Zərəfşan Məmmədova	"Tut ağacım"	✔	—	—	—
7	Mələk Cəfərli	"I Will Survive"	—	—	—	—
8	Safael Mişiyev	"Adventure of a Lifetime"	✔	✔	✔	✔
9	Nafisat Akiyeva	"Contigo en la Distancia"	—	✔	—	—
10	Əli Faiq Mirzəyev	"Pərvanə"	—	✔	✔	✔

=== Episode 5 (Mar. 9) ===
Order	Artist	Song	Coach's and contestant's choices			
Order	Artist	Song	Murad	Zülfiyyə	Röya	Eldar
1	Yusif Qasımov	"Just the Two of Us"	✔	—	—	—
2	Səmayə Xankişiyeva	"Give Us A Little Love"	—	—	—	—
3	Qəşəm Cəfərov	"Neyləyək"	—	✔	✔	—
4	Arzu Hüseynov	"Tiryakinim"	✔	✔	✔	—
5	Emil Məmməd-zadə	"Unuda bilməzsən"	—	—	—	—
6	Əhməd Balayev	"Hurt"	—	—	—	—
7	Seymur Qasımzadə	"Əziz dost"	—	—	—	✔
8	Könül Məmmədova	"Je suis malade"	—	✔	—	—
9	Yuliya Medvednikova, Russia	"Love Scenes"	✔	✔	—	✔
10	Ramin Şirəlizadə	"Xatirə"	✔	—	—	✔

== Kids version ==
Team Murad
Team Zulfiyya
Team Chingiz

Season	First aired	Last aired	Winner	Runner-up	Third place	Winning coach	Presenter	Coaches (chair's order)		
Season	First aired	Last aired	Winner	Runner-up	Third place	Winning coach	Presenter	1	2	3
1	February 7, 2020	May 2, 2021	Amina Hajiyeva	Sona Azizova	Adelina Bayseupova	Chingiz Mustafayev	Leyla Quliyeva	Murad	Zulfiyya	Chingiz

Coaches' timeline
Coach	Season	
Coach	1	2
Murad Arif		
Zulfiyya Khanbabayeva		
Chingiz Mustafayev		

=== Teams ===
Colour key

- Winner
- Runner-up
- Third place
- Eliminated in the Final
- Eliminated in the Sing Offs
- Eliminated in the Battle rounds

Coaches	Top 45 artists				
Murad Arif					
Murad Arif	Adelina Bayseupova	İskəndər Həsənzadə	Aylin Altınkaya	Atilla Qərib	Fidan Zeynallı
Murad Arif	Adel Nazarçuk	Matvey Soqomonov	Tuncay Oruczadə	Boqdan Titarenko	Leyli Nəcəfova
Murad Arif	Kamran İbrahim	Nuridə Zamanova	Yeganə Hüseynova	Timur Nərimanov	Lalə Rəfiyeva
Zülfiyyə Xanbabayeva					
Zülfiyyə Xanbabayeva	Sona Əzizova	Zəminə Nurullayeva	Sabir Əliyev	Leyla Məmmədova	Gülyaz Həsənzadə
Zülfiyyə Xanbabayeva	Leyla Tağızadə	Mariya Quleviç	Mail Manafov	Fəxriyyə Əliyeva	Məhəmməd Allahverdiyev
Zülfiyyə Xanbabayeva	Aylin Nəcəfli	Yelizaveta Primina	Ülvi Tahirov	Nurdan Hüseynzadə	Fəqan Xəlilli
Çingiz Mustafayev					
Çingiz Mustafayev	Əminə Hacıyeva	Yalkı Saka	Aylin Nağıyeva	Həsən Əliyev	Hikmət Qasımov
Çingiz Mustafayev	Tamari Kavtaradze	Sofya Serebryanskaya	Nuran Qafarova	Xəyal və Fatimə Tarıverdizadələr	Nurlana Veysova
Çingiz Mustafayev	Elvin Salmanov	Valeriya Xristyuk	Leyla Qürbətli	Teymur Süleymanov	Məhəmməd Baxşizadə

=== Blind auditions ===
Colour key

✔	Coach pressed his/her "I WANT YOU" button
	Artist defaulted to this coach's team
	Artist elected to join this coach's team
	Artist eliminated with no coach pressing his or her "I WANT YOU" button

==== Episode 1 (Feb. 7) ====
Order	Artist	Age	Song	Coach's and contestant's choices		
Order	Artist	Age	Song	Murad	Zülfiyyə	Çingiz
1	Hikmət Qasımov	12	"Roya kimi"	✔	✔	✔
2	Leyla Tağızadə	13	"You Know I'm No Good"	✔	✔	✔
3	Cəlal Bəşirli	11	"You Are Not Alone"	—	—	—
4	İlham Hüseynov	11	"Attention"	—	—	—
5	Aylin Altınkaya, Turkey	11	"The Winner Takes It All"	✔	✔	—
6	Gülyaz Həsənzadə	13	"Neden oldu"	✔	✔	✔
7	Mail Manafov	10	"Opera №2"	—	✔	—
8	Nuru Qasımov	13	"Roi"	—	—	—
9	Tamari Kavtaradze, Georgia	11	"Adagio"	✔	✔	✔
10	Kamran İbrahim	11	"Girls Like You"	✔	—	—
11	İskəndər Həsənzadə	11	"Can You Feel the Love Tonight"	✔	✔	✔

==== Episode 2 (Feb. 14) ====
Order	Artist	Age	Song	Coach's and contestant's choices		
Order	Artist	Age	Song	Murad	Zülfiyyə	Çingiz
1	Həsən Əliyev	10	"O mənə inanır"	✔	—	✔
2	Adelina Bayseupova, Russia	12	"History Repeating"	✔	✔	✔
3	Vüsalə Bəkirzadə	11	"Zazhigay serdtse"	—	—	—
4	Leyla Məmmədova	12	"Bakı"	—	✔	—
5	Nuran Qafarova	13	"Havana"	—	—	✔
6	Aysu Abdullazadə	13	"Qısqana-qısqana"	—	—	—
7	Atilla Qərib	11	"Luna"	✔	✔	✔
8	Yelizaveta Primina, Kazakhstan	11	"Bird Set Free"	✔	✔	✔
9	Əliyyə Süleymanova	12	"Million Reasons"	—	—	—
10	Elvin Salmanov	14	"Life"	—	✔	✔
11	Boqdan Titarenko, Ukraine	14	"Dream a Little Dream of Me"	✔	✔	—
12	Zəminə Nurullayeva	13	"Wrecking Ball"	✔	✔	✔

==== Episode 3 (Feb. 21) ====
Order	Artist	Age	Song	Coach's and contestant's choices		
Order	Artist	Age	Song	Murad	Zülfiyyə	Çingiz
1	Teymur Süleymanov	11	"Sarı gəlin"	✔	—	✔
2	Sübhan İsmayılov	10	"Şən Azərbaycan"	—	—	—
3	Yalkı Saka, Turkey	12	"Feeling Good"	✔	✔	✔
4	Səid Babazadə	14	"Alleya"	—	—	—
5	Yeganə Hüseynova	12	"Felaket"	✔	—	—
6	Matvey Soqomonov, Russia	13	"Lose Yourself"	✔	—	✔
7	Tuncay Oruczadə	8	"Qarabağ maralı"	✔	—	—
8	İbrahim İsayev	10	"Bella ciao"	—	—	—
9	Sona Əzizova	10	"Zombie"	✔	✔	✔
10	Nurlana Veysova	14	"Love Yourself"	—	✔	✔
11	Mariya Quleviç, Belarus	10	"All About That Bass"	—	✔	—
12	Aylin Nəcəfli	12	"Drip Drop"	—	✔	—

==== Episode 4 (Feb. 28) ====
Order	Artist	Age	Song	Coach's and contestant's choices		
Order	Artist	Age	Song	Murad	Zülfiyyə	Çingiz
1	Fəqan Xəlilli	10	"Aşiqəm"	✔	✔	✔
2	Leyla Qürbətli	12	"Love it ritm"	✔	—	✔
3	Adel Nazarçuk, Ukraine	9	"No Roots"	✔	—	—
4	Əli Abdullayev	11	"Despacito"	—	—	—
5	Leyli Nəcəfova	13	"Love Me like You Do"	✔	—	—
6	Aylin Nağıyeva	12	"Love You Like a Love Song"	—	✔	✔
7	Məhəmməd Baxşizadə	12	"Zabyt' tebya"	✔	✔	✔
8	Leyla Hüseynova	11	"Lost on You"	—	—	—
9	Nurdan Hüseynzadə	14	"Tufanla oynama"	—	✔	—
10	Nuridə Zamanova	14	"Ddu-Du Ddu-Du"	✔	—	✔
11	Etibar Əsgərzadə	12	"Almanı atdım xarala"	—	—	—
12	Müzəffər Fərzəliyev	12	"Pəncərə"	—	—	—
13	Sabir Əliyev	10	"September"	✔	✔	✔

==== Episode 5 (Mar. 6) ====
Order	Artist	Age	Song	Coach's and contestant's choices		
Order	Artist	Age	Song	Murad	Zülfiyyə	Çingiz
1	Fidan Zeynallı	12	"idontwannabeyouanymore"	✔	✔	—
2	Ülvi Tahirov	13	"Ana"	—	✔	✔
3	Ruqlay Əlisoy	8	"Sinyaya vechnost'"	—	—	—
4	Lalə Rəfiyeva	14	"Je veux"	✔	—	—
5	Fəxriyyə Əliyeva	10	"Fly Me to the Moon"	✔	✔	✔
6	Timur Nərimanov	14	"There's Nothing Holding Me Back"	✔	—	—
7	Sofya Serebryanskaya	12	"We Remain"	—	✔	✔
8	Fuad Məmişov	11	"Vera"	—	—	—
9	Valeriya Xristyuk	14	"Cerce"	✔	✔	✔
10	Əminə Hacıyeva	14	"At Last"	✔	✔	✔
11	Məhəmməd Allahverdiyev	11	"Besame mucho"	—	✔	✔
12	Xəyal and Fatimə Tarıverdizadələr	11/10	"Gəl, ey səhər"	—	—	✔

=== The Battles ===
Coach	Winner	Song	Did Not Win	
Çingiz	Hikmət Qasımov	"Moy Azerbaydzhan"	Nurlana Veysova	Məhəmməd Baxşizadə
Çingiz	Yalkı Saka	"Rockabye"	Tamari Kavtaradze	Elvin Salmanov
Zülfiyyə	Zəminə Nurullayeva	"Hello"	Leyla Tağızadə	Aylin Nəcəfli
Zülfiyyə	Sabir Əliyev	"How Deep Is Your Love"	Mail Manafov	Ülvi Tahirov
Murad	Atilla Qərib	"Bez boyu"	Boqdan Titarenko	Timur Nərimanov
Murad	Fidan Zeynallı	"Dance Monkey"	Leyli Nəcəfova	Lalə Rəfiyeva
Murad	İskəndər Həsənzadə	"Rolling in the Deep"	Adel Nazarçuk	Kamran İbrahim
Zülfiyyə	Leyla Məmmədova	"Diamonds"	Fəxriyyə Əliyeva	Nurdan Hüseynzadə
Çingiz	Əminə Hacıyeva	"Shallow"	Sofya Serebryanskaya	Valeriya Xristyuk
Çingiz	Həsən Əliyev	"Ay qız"	Teymur Süleymanov	Xəyal və Fatimə Tarıverdizadələr
Zülfiyyə	Sona Əzizova	"Never Tear Us Apart"	Mariya Quleviç	Yelizaveta Primina
Zülfiyyə	Gülyaz Həsənzadə	"Bayatılar"	Məhəmməd Allahverdiyev	Fəqan Xəlilli
Çingiz	Aylin Nağıyeva	"Kuda uhodit detstvo"	Nuran Qafarova	Leyla Qürbətli
Murad	Adelina Bayseupova	"Crazy in Love"	Matvey Soqomonov	Nuridə Zamanova
Murad	Aylin Altınkaya	"Sən gəlməz oldun"	Tuncay Oruczadə	Yeganə Hüseynova

=== The Sing-offs ===
Colour key

Artist was saved by his/her coach and advanced to the Final
Artist was eliminated

Coach	Artist	Song	Result
Murad	Atilla Qərib	"Luna"	Eliminated
Murad	Fidan Zeynallı	"idontwannabeyouanymore"	Eliminated
Murad	Adelina Bayseupova	"History Repeating"	Murad's Choice
Murad	Aylin Altınkaya	"The Winner Takes It All"	Eliminated
Murad	İskəndər Həsənzadə	"Can You Feel the Love Tonight"	Murad's Choice
Zülfiyyə	Gülyaz Həsənzadə	"Neden oldu"	Eliminated
Zülfiyyə	Sabir Əliyev	"September"	Eliminated
Zülfiyyə	Zəminə Nurullayeva	"Wrecking Ball"	Zülfiyyə's Choice
Zülfiyyə	Leyla Məmmədova	"Bakı"	Eliminated
Zülfiyyə	Sona Əzizova	"Zombie"	Zülfiyyə's Choice
Çingiz	Aylin Nağıyeva	"Love You Like a Love Song"	Eliminated
Çingiz	Əminə Hacıyeva	"At Last"	Çingiz's Choice
Çingiz	Yalkı Saka	"Feeling Good"	Çingiz's Choice
Çingiz	Həsən Əliyev	"O mənə inanır"	Eliminated
Çingiz	Hikmət Qasımov	"Roya kimi"	Eliminated

İctimai Television temporarily suspended the remaining episodes following the COVID-19 pandemic in Azerbaijan. Air dates for the remainder of the first kids season will be announced later on.

== Native songs version ==
Season	First aired	Last aired	Winner	Runner-up	Third place	Winning coach	Presenter	Coaches (chair's order)		
Season	First aired	Last aired	Winner	Runner-up	Third place	Winning coach	Presenter	1	2	3
1	6 Jan 2023	20 Mar 2023	Zulfu Asadzade	Ilkin Dovlatov	Turkay Melikova	Gulyaz Memmedova	Azer Suleymanli	Ilqar	Gulyaz	Samira
