= Jiva (singer) =

Azerbaijani singer (born 1982)

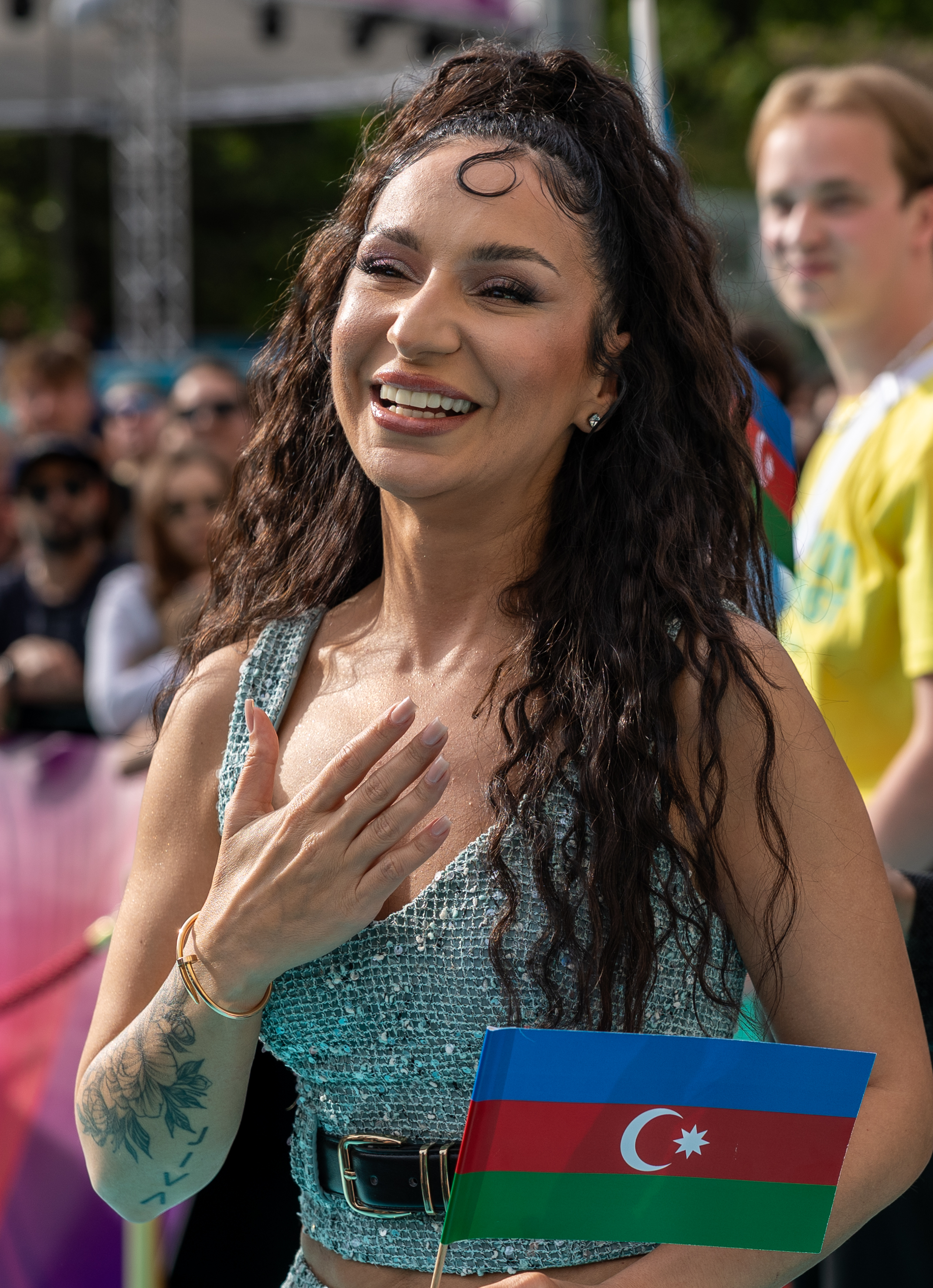
- Jiva in 2026

Background information
- Born: Jamila Hashimova; 9 September 1982 (age 43); Moscow, Russian SFSR, Soviet Union
- Occupations: Singer; songwriter
- Years active: 2003–present

Jamila Hashimova (Azerbaijani: Cəmilə Həşimova; born 9 September 1982), known professionally as Jiva (stylized in all caps), is a Russian-born Azerbaijani singer and songwriter. Jiva won the third season of The Voice of Azerbaijan. Her repertoire includes pop, dance, and R&B, which she performs in Azerbaijani, Russian, and English. She represented Azerbaijan in the Eurovision Song Contest 2026 with her song "Just Go".

== Early life and education ==
Jamila Hashimova was born on 9 September 1982 in Moscow.

== Career ==
Hashimova began her musical career in 2003. In 2011, she participated in the national selection rounds for the Eurovision Song Contest 2011.

In February 2025, Hashimova auditioned for the third season of The Voice of Azerbaijan. In the blind auditions, she earned chair turns from all four coaches. She chose to be on Team Röya. In May, she won the show with a televote percentage of 42.6%.

The Voice of Azerbaijan Performances
	Song	Original Artist(s)	Notes
Blind Audition	"I Have Nothing"	Whitney Houston	Four-chair turn, joins Team Röya
1/8 Final	"Lady Marmalade"	Bob Crewe and Kenny Nolan	
Final	"Pozovi menya s soboy"	Tatyana Snezhina	

Hashimova participated in the Baku Autumn contest and in the Montreux Jazz Festival. She also performed with the band Rast and, as a soloist, with the Hazz Band.

On 6 March 2026, İctimai Television announced that they had internally selected Hashimova, under the stage name Jiva, to represent Azerbaijan in the Eurovision Song Contest 2026. She was one of 18 acts were selected to take part in an audition round, from which she was one of three proceeded to the final stage based on the decision of a jury panel and a focus group. Jiva placed 15th in her Semi Final, receiving two points in total from the jury.

== Discography ==
Credits taken from Apple Music.

=== Singles ===
Title	Year	Album
"Stop Crying"	2021	Non-album singles
"Hey Guy"	2021	Non-album singles
"Telefon Söhbəti"	2022	Non-album singles
"Kəpənək" (with Cris Taylor)	2022	Non-album singles
"Yalan"	2023	Non-album singles
"Rəqs Et"	2023	Non-album singles
"İsti Nəfəsin"	2025	Non-album singles
"Just Go"	2026	Non-album singles
"BUSSI"	2026	Non-album singles

Awards and achievements
Preceded by Nadir Rüstəmli	The Voice of Azerbaijan winner 2025	Succeeded by TBD
Preceded by Mamagama with "Run with U"	Azerbaijan in the Eurovision Song Contest; 2026	Succeeded by TBD
