= Alakbarzadeh =

Alakbarzadeh is a surname. Notable people with the surname include:

- Abulhasan Alakbarzadeh (1906–1986), Soviet Azerbaijani writer
- Sevda Alakbarzadeh (born 1977), Azerbaijani singer
