= Emilia Yagubova =

Azerbaijani singer (born 1986)

Emilia Yagubova Emiliya Yaqubova
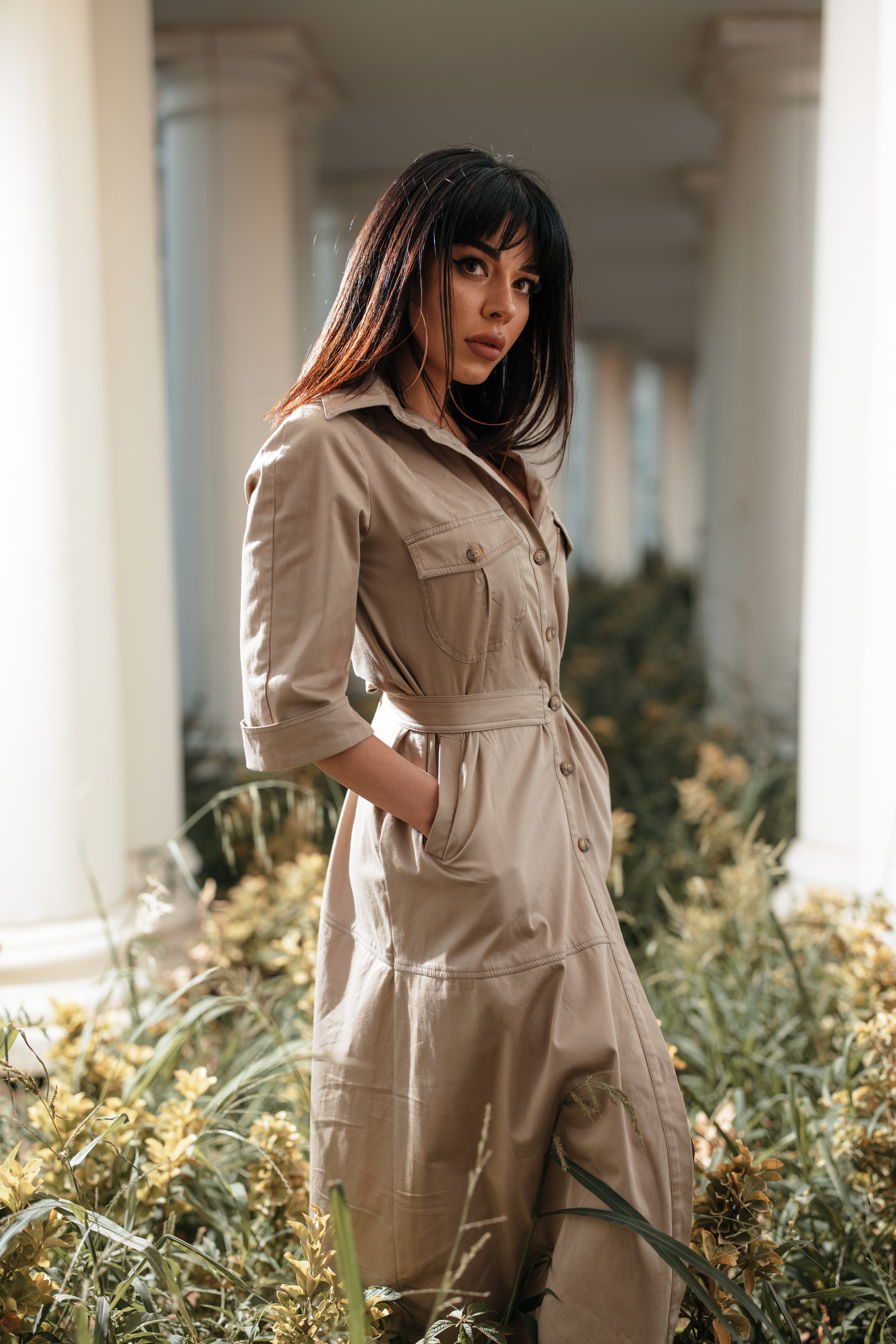
- Yagubova in 2022

Background information
- Also known as: Emy Lia
- Born: May 27, 1986 (age 40); Baku, Azerbaijan SSR, Soviet Union
- Genres: Pop
- Occupations: Singer, artist, piano teacher
- Years active: 2008–present

Emilia Yagubova (Azerbaijani: Emiliya Yaqubova, Russian: Эмилия Ягубова; born 27 May 1986), also known as Emy Lia, is an Azerbaijani pop singer. She is the winner of Voice of Azerbaijan 2015/2016 season. Since 2016 she has been the soloist of Azerbaijan State Television and Radio.

== Early life ==
Emilia Yagubova was born in Baku. She graduated from the piano department of the Music College named after Asaf Zeynalli and the "Art of Music" faculty of the Azerbaijan State University of Culture and Arts.

== Career ==
In 2011, Yagubova participated in the national selection rounds for the Eurovision Song Contest 2011 and was invited to the group of the leader of the "Rast" group, people's artist of the Republic of Azerbaijan Rashad Hashimov. She worked as a soloist of the "Hazz Band" group under the "Rast" group for four years. In 2016, she became the winner of the world-famous The Voice of Azerbaijan (Səs Azərbaycan) competition organized by Azerbaijan Television and Radio Broadcasting CJSC (AzTV) and held for the first time in Azerbaijan. Since 2016, she has worked as a soloist of Azerbaijan State Television and Radio.

In 2014, she performed at the famous "Montreux Jazz Festival" in Switzerland, as a soloist of the "Rast" group.

During 2017–2019, she performed as a soloist in the well-known Alex Fokin's "DJazz Radioband" of Ukraine.

In addition, in 2016, two singles performed by Yagubova were released in a row. They were performed as a cover of "Niyə" (Why) and Zulfiyya Khanbabaeva's song "Son Görüş" (Sensiz).

In 2017, she performed at the "ZHARA" festival in Baku, with the song "Старинные Часы", one of the famous works of Alla Pugacheva.

In 2018, she represented Azerbaijan at the "Discover Silk Road Star" festival held among 14 countries in Batumi, Georgia, and won the competition.

In the same year, she played the role of "Jasmin" in the first children's musical of Azerbaijan, "Aladdin's Magic Lamp", which was staged in the Heydar Aliyev Palace.

Also, in 2018, together with famous producers Emin Efendi and Nigar Hajizadeh, she implemented the project called "Yersiz İstehsal". Within the framework of the project, world-famous pieces of music were synthesized with national musical instruments of Azerbaijan and performed with national color. The works of the world famous "Black or White" (Michael Jackson), "Zombie" (The Cranberries) and "Smells like teen spirit" (Nirvana) were included in this project.

In late October 2023, Yagubova was revealed as one of the sixteen shortlisted candidates in the Azerbaijani selection for the Eurovision Song Contest 2024, and the next week, she was announced to be among the six who had moved on to the final stage. She ultimately was not selected.

== Personal life ==
Since 2019, she has been living in London, Great Britain after getting married.

== Discography ==
- "Niyə" (2016)
- "Son Görüş"
- "Azərbaycan"
- "7AM"
- "Kaş ki"
- "Badi-Kübə"
- "Dərbədər" (2021)
- "Sözsüz mahnı" (2022)

Awards and achievements
Preceded by N/A (First season)	The Voice of Azerbaijan winner 2015–16	Succeeded by Nadir Rüstəmli
