= Tural Asadov =

Azerbaijani actor, television presenter, voice-over artist and film producer

Tural Asadov Tural Əsədov
- Born: 16 August 1982 (age 44); Baku, Azerbaijan SSR
- Education: Western Caspian University
- Occupations: Actor, television presenter, voice-over artist, film producer
- Years active: 2001–present

Tural Asadov (Azerbaijani: Tural Əsədov, born 16 August 1982) is an Azerbaijani actor, television presenter, voice-over artist and film producer.

== Biography ==
=== Vital ===
Tural Jafar oglu Asadov was born on August 16, 1982, in the city of Baku. In 1999, he graduated from high school number 211. In 1999-2003 he studied regional studies at Western University. In 2003-2005 he studied by correspondence for a master's degree in finance at the University of Economics. In 2003–2005, he served in the State Border Service Marine Ships Brigade. For a while he played in the Club of Merry and Witty. He married in 2011 and has a son and a daughter. The Daughter and The Son want to stay anonymous online.

=== Activity ===
Tural Asadov started working in television in 2001 on Space TV channel. He hosted the "Bazar" magazine program broadcast on Space TV.

He has produced numerous commercials and feature films. As a director, he created clips of Azerbaijani pop stars such as Sevda Alekperzadeh, Miri Yusif and Roya. He hosted Roya's concert in the Kremlin.

Tural Asadov was a participant in the "Car 10: Transformer" (Azerbaijani: Maşın Şou 10: Transformer) episode of the car reality show, which aired in May 2010, and had to leave the game on May 17 after losing an SMS fight.

In 2013, he participated in the "Touch the Star" (Azerbaijani: Ulduza toxun) project, produced by Picmus Production, all rights reserved for PicMus LLC.

On December 18, 2013, Tural Asadov and Italian actress Ornella Muti were hosts at the concert entitled "San-Remo festival stars in Baku".

In 2014, he co-hosted the Big Stage (Azerbaijani: Böyük səhnə) vocal project on Azerbaijan's Public Television with popular presenter Husniya Maharramova.

As one of the main actors in the 2015 film Half-World (Azerbaijani: Yarımdünya), directed by Turkish Osman Albayrak, Tural Asadov was also the main producer of the project.

He hosted the opening and closing ceremonies of the Baku 2015 European Games in 2015.

On October 22, 2015, at the Fairmont Hotel, Samsung hosted an event organized by Azerbaijan, where the presentation of the Galaxy Note 5 smartphone and Galaxy Gear S2 smartwatch took place.

In 2015, he was the host of "The Voice of Azerbaijan" song contest.

In 2016, he has been the official voice of Baku City Circuit.

From 2015 to 2018, Tural Asadov served as the Azerbaijani jury spokesperson in the final of the Eurovision Song Contest.

In late 2016, Tural Asadov starred in the romantic-comedy film Too Many Coincidences in New York.

In 2017, he hosted the opening and closing ceremonies of the Islamic Solidarity Games.

In 2019, he hosted the 15th anniversary concert of the Heydar Aliyev Foundation. He commented on the Europa League final on May 29, 2019, at the Baku Olympic Stadium.

== Projects ==
As an actor

- Protect Men (full-length feature film) (role: Zaur)
- Istanbul holiday (full-length feature film) (role: correspondent)
- Stolen Dreams (feature series) (role: Elnur)
- Dmitrov street 86 (short feature film) (role: Shafiqa's son-in-law)
- Half-world (full-length feature film)
- Too Many Coincidences (full-length feature film) (role: Mike Kowalski)
- Hozu 2 (full-length feature film) (role: Investigator)

As a producer

- Half-world (full-length feature film)

As a dubbing artist

- American pastoral
- Spark
- Underwater era
- Super Alibi
- Escobar
- Bleed for This
