= Nügədi =

Nügədi or Nyugedy or Nyugedi may refer to:

- Birinci Nügədi, Azerbaijan
- İkinci Nügədi, Azerbaijan
