= Azer Suleymanli =

Azerbaijani television presenter

- Azər Süleymanlı
- Born: Azer Sharif oglu Suleymanov; December 10, 1986 (age 39); Ikinci Nugadi, Guba District, Azerbaijan SSR, Soviet Union
- Citizenship: Azerbaijan
- Education: Azerbaijan State University of Culture and Arts
- Occupation: TV presenter
- Years active: 1999–2021
- Notable work: Host of The Voice of Azerbaijan and local commentator of Eurovision Song Contest
- Television: Khayal TV, Region TV, Space TV, Medeniyyet TV, Ictimai TV
- Spouse: Aydan Suleymanli
- Father: Sharif Suleymanov

Azer Sharif oglu Suleymanov (Azerbaijani: Azər Şərif oğlu Süleymanov; born 10 December 1986), known professionally as Azer Suleymanli (Azerbaijani: Azər Süleymanlı) is an Azerbaijani TV presenter. During his career, he worked in Khayal TV, Region TV, Space TV, Medeniyyet TV and Ictimai TV. Azer Suleymanli hosted The Voice of Azerbaijan and was the Azerbaijani commentator for 2016, 2017, and 2018 editions of the Eurovision Song Contest.

== Life ==
Azer Sharif oglu Suleymanov was born on 10 December 1986 in Ikinci Nugadi, Quba District of Azerbaijan. In 2009 he graduated from the Azerbaijan State University of Culture and Arts with honours.

== Career ==
In 1999, when he was still in school, Azer Suleymanli started to host a show for Khayal TV (now Qafqaz TV), which operates in Guba District. Until 2007, he was the host of Bizim sinif, Dünya uşaqların gözü ilə, Hər bazar. He continued his career as one of the first presenters of Region TV (now ARB TV), founded in 2007. Until 2016, he was the host of the programs Buralar, Azərlə hər bazar, AzərKeş, ÖYRƏNirəm. Azer Suleymanli worked at Space TV from 2008 to 2010. He hosted the karaoke program Mənim Sevimli Mahnım (MSM), as well as the last season of Azəri Star song contest. Suleymanli was the host of the intellectual program 1001 sual on the Medeniyyet TV, which began broadcasting in 2011. He started to host the Şərq ulduzları children's song contest on Azad Azerbaijan TV in 2012.

Azer Suleymanli has been working as a presenter at the Ictimai Television and Radio Broadcasting Company since September 2013. During this time, he hosted the channel's morning program Yeni gün, and since 2017 Sabahın xeyir, Azərbaycan. In 2021, the Ictimai Television and Radio Broadcasting Company acquired the license to broadcast The Voice and the hosting of the project's local edition was entrusted to Azer Suleymanli. Suleymanli was also the Azerbaijani commentator for the Eurovision Song Contest three times in a row – in 2016, 2017, and 2018.

Azer Suleymanli hosted many state-organized events and projects. He also gave seminars on becoming a presenter at the invitation of many universities and youth organizations in the country. Over the years, he has been awarded diplomas and prizes by various government agencies, organizations and public associations.

== Personal life ==
Azer Suleymanli was married in 2014.
