= Nadir Rustamli =

Azerbaijani singer (born 1999)

Nadir Rustamli Nadir Rüstəmli
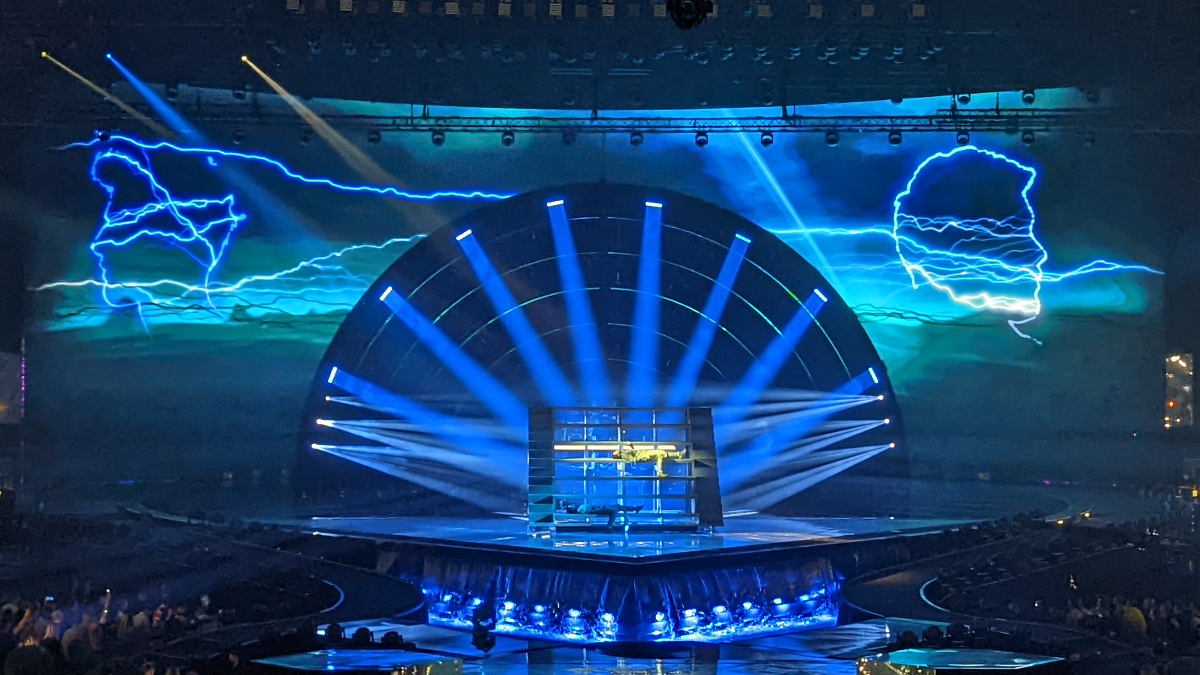
- Rustamli performing at the Eurovision Song Contest 2022

Background information
- Born: Nadir Rashid oghlu Rustamli; 8 July 1999 (age 26); Salyan, Azerbaijan
- Occupation: Singer
- Years active: 2016–present

Nadir Rashid oghlu Rustamli (Azerbaijani: Nadir Rəşid oğlu Rüstəmli, pronounced [nɑˈdiɾ ɾæˈʃid oɣˈlu ɾystæmˈli]; born 8 July 1999) is an Azerbaijani singer. Rustamli won the second season of The Voice of Azerbaijan. He represented Azerbaijan in the Eurovision Song Contest 2022 with the song "Fade To Black", finishing 16th in the final.

== Early life ==
Born in Salyan, Rustamli attended secondary school #3 in 2005–2016. In his younger years, he received piano training at the Gulu Asgarov Music School in his hometown. In 2021, Rustamli graduated from the Azerbaijan University of Tourism and Management with a degree in business administration.

== Career ==
=== 2017–2020 ===
From 2017 onwards, Rustamli has participated in various contests, including the Youthvision 2019 International Song Contest, where he finished second among 21 contestants.

=== 2021: The Voice of Azerbaijan ===
In 2021, he auditioned for the second season of The Voice of Azerbaijan. In the blind auditions, he earned chair turns from Eldar Gasimov and Murad Arif. He chose to be on Team Eldar. In January 2022, he won the show with a televote percentage of 42.6%.

The Voice of Azerbaijan Performances
	Song	Original Artist(s)	Notes
Blind Audition	"Writing's on the Wall"	Sam Smith	Two-chair turn, joins Team Eldar
Battle	"Beggin'"	The Four Seasons	Won against Amir Paşayev
Knockout	"We Could Be The Same"	maNga	
1/8 Final	"Xatirədir"	Alim Qasimov	
Quarterfinal	"Arcade"	Duncan Laurence	
Semifinal	"Just the Way You Are"	Bruno Mars	
Final	"Running Scared"	Ell & Nikki	Duet with Eldar Gasimov
Final	"Bad Liar"	Imagine Dragons	
Final	"Bu da son"	Elnur Hüseynov & Samir Javadzadeh	

=== 2022: Eurovision Song Contest 2022 ===
On 16 February 2022, İctimai Television announced that they had internally selected Rustamli to represent Azerbaijan in the Eurovision Song Contest 2022. He came 10th in the second semi-final with 96 points, qualifying for the final. All of the points came from jury votes, with the public vote not awarding any points. Rustamli performed 15th in the grand final, and came 16th with 106 points; 103 points came from the jury, and 3 from the public.

== Discography ==
=== Singles ===
Title	Year	Peak chart positions	Album or EP
Title	Year	LTU	Album or EP
"Fade to Black"	2022	69	Non-album singles
"Lenetli şeher"	2022	—	Non-album singles
"İzin qalacaq"	2023	—	Non-album singles
"Əbədi sevgi" (with Sivva)	2023	—	Non-album singles
"Unuduram" (with Aslixan and Yanamary)	2023	—	Non-album singles
"Bedel"	2023	—	Non-album singles
"Gölgelerim"	2023	—	Non-album singles
"Duman"	2024	—	Non-album singles
"Yalan" (with Aslixan)	2025	—	Non-album singles
"—" denotes a recording that did not chart or was not released in that territory.

Awards and achievements
Preceded by Emilia Yagubova	The Voice of Azerbaijan winner 2021–22	Succeeded by Jamila Hashimova
Preceded by Efendi with "Mata Hari"	Azerbaijan in the Eurovision Song Contest; 2022	Succeeded by TuralTuranX with "Tell Me More"
