= Berent =

Berent may refer to:

- German name of Kościerzyna
- Kreis Berent, kreis of West Prussia
- Berent (surname)
- Berent Kavaklıoğlu
- Berent Schwineköper
