= Kepez Belediyesi S.K. =

Turkish basketball club

Kepez Belediyespor is a basketball club based in Kepez - Antalya, Turkey that plays in the Turkish Basketball League. They got promoted from the Second League as the runners-up in the 2006-2007 season. They finished their 2007-2008 TBL season in 11th spot with 12 wins.

The club is sponsored by Kepez Municipality.

== Current roster ==
Kepez Belediyespor roster
Players
Coaches

Pos.	No.	Nat.	Name	Ht.
SF	-	(Turkey)	Vekiloğlu, Arda	2.06 m (6 ft 9 in)
C	-	(Bosnia and Herzegovina)	Bavčić, Edin	2.10 m (6 ft 11 in)
-	44	(United States)	Saunders, Edmund
SG	-	(United States)	Fitch, Gerald	1.91 m (6 ft 3 in)
SF	11	(Sweden) (Turkey)	İnan, Serkan	1.97 m (6 ft 6 in)
PF	-	(Turkey)	Enis Ekmen, Enver	2.06 m (6 ft 9 in)
PF	32	(United States)	Traylor, Robert	2.03 m (6 ft 8 in)
-	53	(United States)	McLinton, Darren
SG	35	(Turkey)	Esmer, Güven	1.92 m (6 ft 4 in)
SG	20	(Turkey)	Erol, Hakan	2.00 m (6 ft 7 in)
PG	19	(Turkey)	Kavaklıoğlu, Berent	1.86 m (6 ft 1 in)
PG	8	(Turkey)	Urcu, Arda	1.80 m (5 ft 11 in)
C	10	(Turkey)	Bilgin, Levent	2.06 m (6 ft 9 in)
C	4	(Turkey)	Yavşaner, Melih	2.09 m (6 ft 10 in)

Head coach

- (Bosnia and Herzegovina) Sabit Hadzij

Assistant coach(es)

- None

Legend

- (C) Team captain
- Injured
