= Hakan Erol =

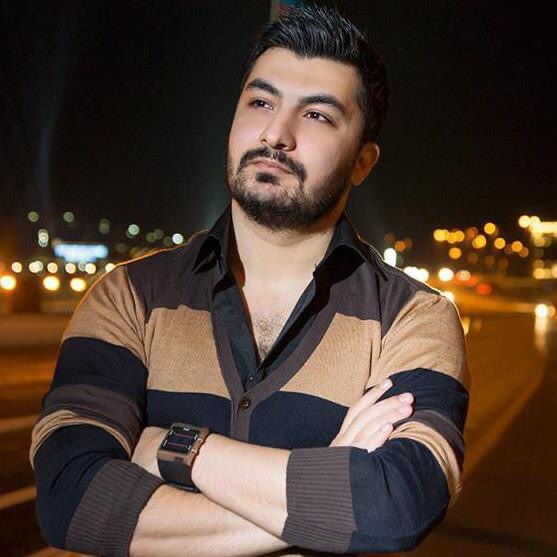

Background information
- Born: August 10, 1984 (age 42); Erzurum, Turkey
- Genre: Pop
- Occupations: composer, arranger, singer
- Years active: 2005–present
- Label: Hakan Production • netd müzik

Hakan Erol (born August 10, 1984, in Erzurum, Turkey) is a Turkish musician, composer, arranger and singer.

== Biography ==
Hakan Erol was born on August 10, 1984, in Erzurum. He graduated from Azerbaijan State University of Culture and Arts in 2005.

== Works ==
Year	Song	Performer	Credits
2011	Düşün məni	Aygün Kazımova	arranger
2011	Bir gecəlik	Aygün Kazımova	composer, arranger
2011	Nankor	Aygün Kazımova	arranger
2012	Sən artıq mənimsən	Aygün Kazımova	composer, arranger
2012	Səssiz Sinema	Aygün Kazımova	composer, arranger
2014	Sənə xəstəyəm	Aygün Kazımova	composer, arranger
2014	Səndən adam olmayacaq	Aygün Kazımova	composer, arranger
2013	Təsadüf	Aygün Kazımova	composer, arranger
2015	Aklım başıma geldi	Aygün Kazımova	composer, arranger
2013	Nə vaxtsa	Aygün Kazımova	composer, arranger
2016	Doldur ürəyimi	Röya	composer, arranger
2015	Sən yox	Röya	composer, arranger
2014	Unutmalıydım çoxdan	Röya	composer, arranger
2015	Səni belə sevmədilər	Aygün Kazımova	composer, arranger
2017	Seni Böyle Sevmediler	Aygün Kazımova	composer
2018	Seni Böyle Sevmediler	Sinan Akçıl	composer
2020	Doldur Yüreğimi	Funda Arar	composer
2014	Kör olsun	Cengiz Kurtoğlu	composer
	Orada biri var	Zamiq Hüseynov	composer
	Yağış	Zamiq Hüseynov	composer
	Mən görmədim	Zamiq Hüseynov	composer
	Nə fərq edər	Zamiq Hüseynov	composer
	Kaman	Zamiq Hüseynov	arranger
	Bəyaz mələyim	Zamiq Hüseynov	arranger
	Məni yaşadan insan	Zamiq Hüseynov	composer
	Yaşadıq	Sevda Yahyayeva	composer
	Aç mənə vərəq	Sevda Yahyayeva	composer
2015	Yalnış adam	Sevda Yahyayeva	composer
	Qurban olaram	Sevda Yahyayeva	composer
	Sənsiz olmaz	Abbas Bağırov	composer
	Uzaq sevincim	Miri Yusif	composer
	Qiymətlim	Miri Yusif	composer
	Günəş	Miri Yusif	arranger
2014	Bilmək olmaz	Miri Yusif	arranger
2017	Sənə aid	Aysel Əlizadə	composer
2017	Sarılsam	Aysel Əlizadə	composer
	Unutmuram	Jeyla	composer
	O hardan bilsin	Jeyla	composer
	Bilsən	Jeyla	composer
	Unutma	Jeyla	composer
	Mənsiz olan	Jeyla	composer
2019	Hərdən arada	Səidə Sultan	composer
	Olsan da, olmasan da	Səidə Sultan	composer
2015	Bu hisslər bitməsin	Zulfiyya Khanbabayeva	composer
	İlk baxışdan məhəbbət	Zulfiyya Khanbabayeva	composer
2019	Sevən tərəfdə mən	Zulfiyya Khanbabayeva	composer, arranger
2019	Elə bilirdim	Röya	composer, arranger
2020	Arafta	Jeyla	composer, arranger
2018	Duygular	Jeyla	composer, arranger
2019	İster Yar Ol	Gökhan Erol	composer, arranger
2019	Milyon şanslar	Roza Zargarli	composer
2018	Gəl, gör	Miri Yusif	composer
2016	Körpələrin səsi	Zulfiyya Khanbabayeva, Alim Qasimov, Farghana Qasimova, Abbas Bağırov,	composer, arranger
2014	Bir az sevgi	Ilgara Kazimova	composer
2019	Keçmiş olsun	Sevda Yəhyayeva	composer, arranger
2019	Neredesin Sen	İlyas Yalçıntaş	arranger
2020	Vətən oğlu	Aygün Kazımova	
2020	Nələr oldu	Ilhama Gasimova	arranger
2021	Bu qadın	Aygün Kazımova	record producer

== Awards ==
Year	Nomination	Award	Result
2011	Hakan Erol	Arranger of the year	Won
