= Too Many Coincidences =

2016 film

- Film poster
- Directed by: Ulviyya Konul
- Written by: Ramiz Fataliyev, Aleksandr Mardan
- Produced by: Mushfug Hatamov
- Starring: Tural Asadov; Aydan Akhunzadeh; Kamran Aghabalayev; Evgeniya Orudzheva; Afag Bashirgyzy
- Cinematography: Nadir Mehdiyev
- Music by: Aytan Ismikhanova
- Production company: Azerbaijanfilm
- Release date: 15 December 2016 (Nizami Cinema Center)
- Running time: 90 minutes
- Countries: Azerbaijan, USA
- Language: Azerbaijani

Too Many Coincidences (Azerbaijani: Həddən artıq uyğunluq) is a 2016 Azerbaijani drama film directed by Ulviyya Konul.

== Synopsis ==
The main characters – Mike Kovalski, a young American of Azerbaijani descent and a young business woman Aydan Bagirzade face a number of similar situations. They meet by accident and their meeting is full of surprises.

== Cast ==
- Tural Asadov as Michael Kovalski
- Aydan Akhundzadeh as Aydan Bagirzadeh
- Evgeniya Orudzheva as Jane
- Kamran Aghabalayev as Ajdar
- Afag Bashirgyzy as Fatma Hala
