= Fade to Black (Nadir Rustamli song) =

2022 single by Nadir Rustamli

Single by Nadir Rustamli
- Language: English
- Released: 21 March 2022
- Length: 2:57
- Songwriters: Andreas Stone Johansson; Anderz Wrethov; Sebastian Schub; Thomas Stengaard

Music video
- "Fade to Black" on YouTube

Eurovision Song Contest 2022 entry
- Country: Azerbaijan
- Artist: Nadir Rustamli
- Language: English
- Composers: Andreas Stone Johansson; Anderz Wrethov; Sebastian Schub; Thomas Stengaard
- Lyricists: Andreas Stone Johansson; Anderz Wrethov; Sebastian Schub; Thomas Stengaard

Finals performance
- Semi-final result: 10th
- Semi-final points: 96
- Final result: 16th
- Final points: 106

Entry chronology
- ◄ "Mata Hari" (2021)
- "Tell Me More" (2023) ►

"Fade to Black" is a 2022 single by Azerbaijani singer Nadir Rustamli. The song represented Azerbaijan in the Eurovision Song Contest 2022 in Turin, Italy, after being internally selected by İctimai Television (İTV), Azerbaijan's broadcaster for the Eurovision Song Contest. The song "became the first ... to qualify without scoring a single point from the televote."

== Release ==
The song was released on 21 March 2022, with the official music video being released on the Eurovision Song Contest's YouTube channel.

== Eurovision Song Contest ==
=== Selection ===
On 30 December 2021, the Azerbaijani broadcaster İctimai Television (İTV) opened a song submission period for interested composers to submit their songs into the Azerbaijani selection until 31 January 2022. All entrants who wished to take part in the Azerbaijani song selection were to provide a brief description of themselves as part of their submission. Six songs were shortlisted from around 300 submissions, which will be offered to the chosen artist for selection.

Nadir Rustamli was announced as the selected artist on 16 February 2022, during İTV's breakfast show Sabahın xeyir, Azərbaycan ("Good morning Azerbaijan").

=== At Eurovision ===
According to Eurovision rules, all nations with the exceptions of the host country and the "Big Five" (France, Germany, Italy, Spain and the United Kingdom) are required to qualify from one of two semi-finals in order to compete for the final; the top ten countries from each semi-final progress to the final. The European Broadcasting Union (EBU) split up the competing countries into six different pots based on voting patterns from previous contests, with countries with favourable voting histories put into the same pot. On 25 January 2022, an allocation draw was held which placed each country into one of the two semi-finals, as well as which half of the show they would perform in. Azerbaijan was placed into the second semi-final, held on 12 May 2022, and performed in the first half of the show. Azerbaijan score 96 points from the juries, but zero from the public vote. However, the high number of jury points ensured the country qualified to the final, becoming the first, and as of 2024, only country to do so. In the final, the entry scored 103 points from the juries and just 3 points from the televote. All 3 points came from their neighbour, Georgia.

== Charts ==
Chart performance for "Fade to Black"
Chart (2022)	Peak position
Lithuania (AGATA)	69
