= Just Go (Jiva song) =

2026 song by Azerbaijani singer Jiva

Single by Jiva
- Language: English; Azerbaijani
- Released: 10 March 2026
- Recorded: 2026
- Genre: Pop; Ballad
- Length: 3:00
- Label: BEAT Music
- Composer: Fuad Javadov
- Lyricists: Fuad Javadov; Nurlana Jafarova
- Producers: Fuad Javadov; Mila Miles; Anar Keytarman; Hafiz Bakhish; Rustam Rzayev

Music videos
- "Just Go" on YouTube "Just Go" (rock version) on YouTube

Eurovision Song Contest 2026 entry
- Country: Azerbaijan
- Artist: Jiva
- Languages: English; Azerbaijani
- Composer: Fuad Javadov
- Lyricists: Fuad Javadov; Nurlana Jafarova

Finals performance
- Semi-final result: 15th
- Semi-final points: 2

Entry chronology
- ◄ "Run with U" (2025)

Official performance video
- "Just Go" (second semi-final) on YouTube

"Just Go" is a song by Azerbaijani singer Jiva (born Jamila Hashimova), released as a single on March 10, 2026, by BEAT Music under an exclusive license from İctimai TV. The song represented Azerbaijan in the Eurovision Song Contest 2026, held in Vienna, Austria.

== Background and release ==
On December 15, 2025, the Azerbaijani participating broadcaster, İctimai Televiziya (İTV), announced that its representative for the Eurovision Song Contest 2026 would be selected internally. Following an open submission window that yielded 186 entries, an audition process narrowed the candidates down to three finalists, evaluated by a jury and an international focus group.

On March 6, 2026, İTV officially announced that Jiva-who had previously won the third season of The Voice of Azerbaijan-would represent the country. Her competing entry, "Just Go", was formally unveiled on March 9, 2026, alongside an official music video directed by Sarkhan Akhundov. The song was released on digital download and streaming platforms the following day. An alternate "Rock Version" of the track was subsequently featured in the Eurovision.

== Composition ==
"Just Go" is a pop and dance track featuring lyrics predominantly in English, alongside a bridge section in Azerbaijani. The music was composed by Fuad Javadov, who also co-wrote the lyrics with Nurlana Jafarova. Lyrically, the song addresses the aftermath of a deceitful relationship. The lyrics detail a protagonist who has finally seen through their partner's disguise and lies (e.g., "Now every word feels like a lie / I'm done, I'm saying goodbye"), reclaiming their independence and demanding that the partner leave.

== Eurovision Song Contest ==
=== At Eurovision ===
Jiva performed "Just Go" in position 2 during the live broadcast. Following the voting period, Azerbaijan was not announced as one of the ten qualifiers advancing to the grand final. It was later revealed that "Just Go" placed 15th (last) in the semi-final, scoring only 2 points. This outcome marked Azerbaijan's worst result in the contest since its debut in 2008.

== Track listing ==
Digital download / streaming

"Just Go" - 3:00

Digital download / streaming (Rock Version)

"Just Go (Rock Version)" - 3:00
