= Run with U (Mamagama song) =

2025 single by Mamagama

Single by Mamagama
- Released: 19 February 2025
- Genre: Folk; disco; funk; electro-folk
- Length: 3:03
- Label: Beat Music
- Composers: Hasan Heydar; Roman Zee; Sefael Mishiyev
- Lyricist: Safael Mishiyev
- Producers: Roman Zee; Hasan "KHVS" Heydar; Safael Mishi

Mamagama singles chronology
"This Is for You" (2023)	"Run with U" (2025)

Music videos
- "Run with U" on YouTube "Run with U" (deep house version) on YouTube

Eurovision Song Contest 2025 entry
- Country: Azerbaijan
- Artist: Mamagama
- Language: English
- Composers: Hasan Heydar; Roman Zee; Safael Mishiyev
- Lyricist: Safael Mishiyev

Finals performance
- Semi-final result: 15th
- Semi-final points: 7

Entry chronology
- ◄ "Özünlə apar" (2024)
- "Just Go" (2026) ►

Official performance video
- "Run with U" (first semi-final) on YouTube

"Run with U" is a song by Azerbaijani rock band Mamagama. The song was released on 19 February 2025 and was written by Hasan "KHVS" Heydar, Roman Zee, and Safael Mishiyev. It represented Azerbaijan in the Eurovision Song Contest 2025. The song's sound was compared to Daft Punk and Chic.

== Eurovision Song Contest 2025 ==
=== Internal selection ===
Azerbaijan's broadcaster for the Eurovision Song Contest, İctimai Televiziya (İTV), officially announced their intentions to participate in the Eurovision Song Contest 2025 on 3 August 2024. On 4 August 2024, İTV announced that both the artist and song that would represent Azerbaijan at the Eurovision Song Contest 2025 would be selected internally. Their announcement called for interested artists and songwriters were called upon to submit their applications and entries by 15 September 2024. Songwriters could be of any nationality. On 4 February 2025, İTV announced that the band Mamagama would represent Azerbaijan. The selection of Mamagama as the Azerbaijani Eurovision contestant was based on the decision of a jury panel consisting of national and international music industry experts. Mamagama's competing song, "Run with U", was released on 19 February 2025.

=== At Eurovision ===
The Eurovision Song Contest 2025 took place at St. Jakobshalle in Basel, Switzerland, and consisted of two semi-finals held on the respective dates of 13 and 15 May and the final on 17 May 2025. During the allocation draw held on 28 January 2025, Azerbaijan was drawn to compete in the first semi-final, performing in the second half of the show. The band failed to qualify for the grand final.
