= Azerbaijani musical instruments =

Azerbaijani traditional musical instruments are a family of ancient string, wind and percussion instruments used in the performance of Azerbaijani traditional music.

== Types of instruments ==
Instruments used in traditional Azerbaijani music include the stringed instruments tar (skin faced lute), the kamancha (skin faced spike fiddle), the oud, originally barbat, and the saz (long necked lute); the double-reed wind instrument balaban, the frame drum ghaval, the cylindrical double faced drum nagara (davul), and the goshe nagara (naqareh) (pair of small kettle drums). Other instruments include the garmon (small accordion), tutek (whistle flute), and daf (frame drum).

The zurna and naghara duo is played at weddings and other local celebrations.

Instruments can be played individually, in an improvisational manner, in ensembles, during traditional ceremonies and folk dances.

=== String instruments ===
The main stringed instruments are tar and kamancha, which are the part of the national music mugham. They together with ghaval create trio in mugham. Tar is a keyhole-shaped and kamancha is round shaped instrument. Their strings are made of silk or horsehair. Tar traditionally crafted around the country and in 2012 craftsmanship of tar was added to the UNESCO Intangible Cultural Heritage Lists of Humanity. Walnut or mulberry trees are used in order to carve tar. It has long neck and deep body. Traditionally neck was tied 27-28 frets. In the twentieth century Azerbaijani musician Mirza Sadigh (also known as Sadighjan) made some changes by increasing number of strings to18. Then he reduces strings to 13. In order to strengthen the sound effects, he reduced the depth of the body part by flattening the sides.

In 1932, Uzeyir Hajibeyov created an orchestra consisted of Azerbaijani folk instruments. The first tar and kamancha concerts with symphony orchestra were arranged by Haji Khanmammadov. Nowadays, Farkhad Khudyev and Imamyar Hasanov are well-known Azerbaijani kamancha players. In 2013, Farkhad Khudyev performed concert for kamancha with the Youth Music Monterrey County Symphony Orchestra from California dedicated to the 25th anniversary of the Khamammadov’s Symphony Orchestra.

Another stringed instrument is saz which is performed by ashiks. It is an ancient musical instrument that originally national poems were narrated by. In 2009, Azerbaijani ashik music was included in the list of Intangible Cultural Heritage by the UNESCO.

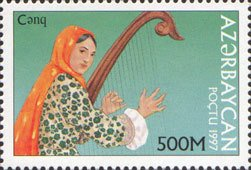
Cǝnq, an arched harp of Azerbaijan.

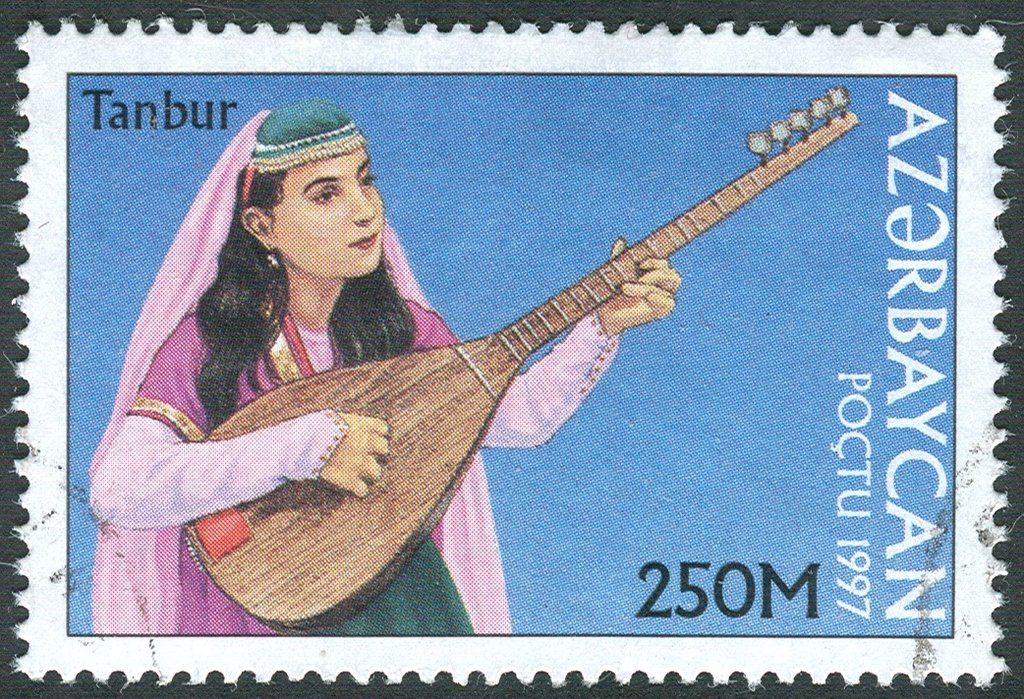
Azerbaijani version of the tanbur

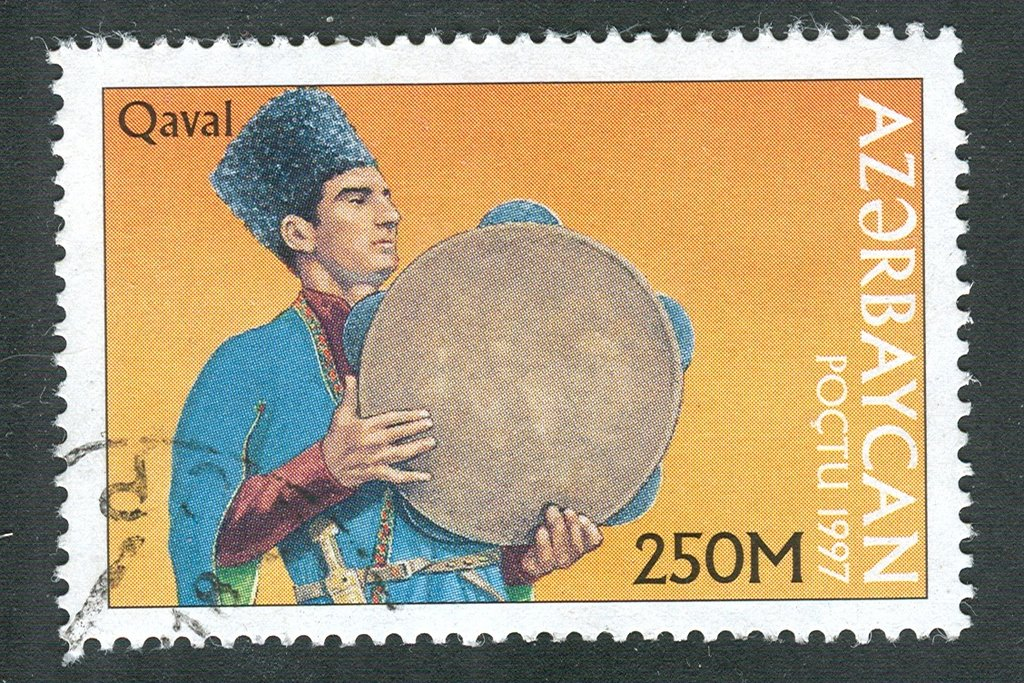
Qaval

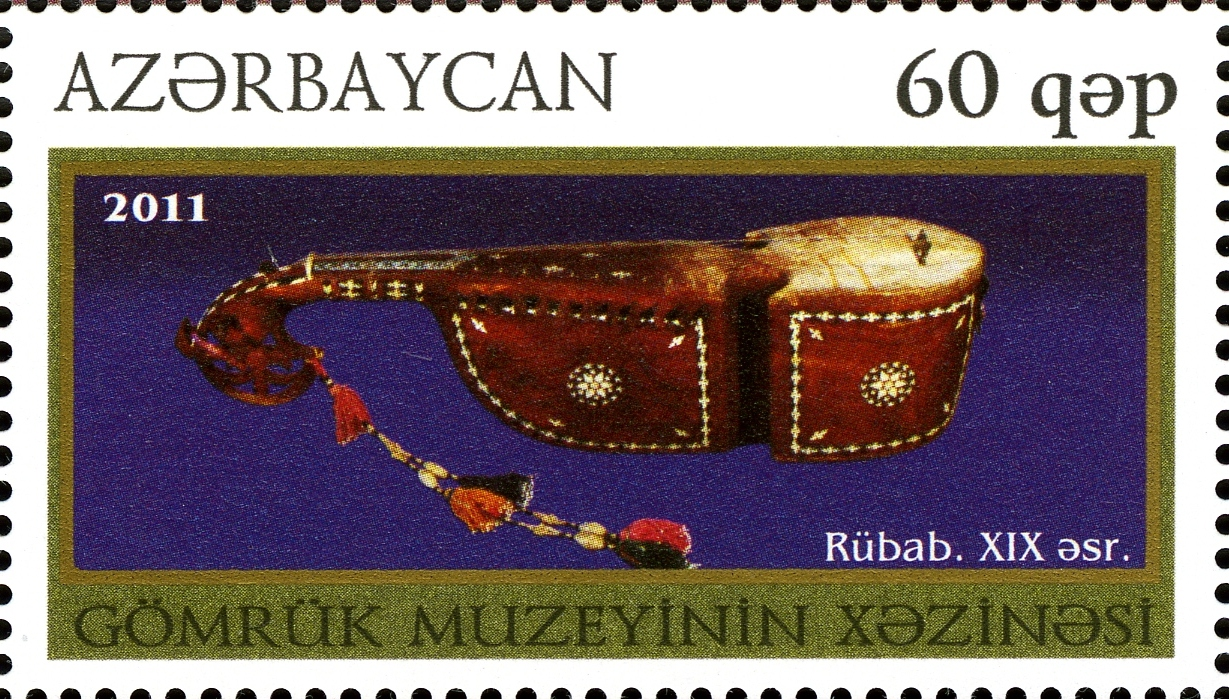
rubab

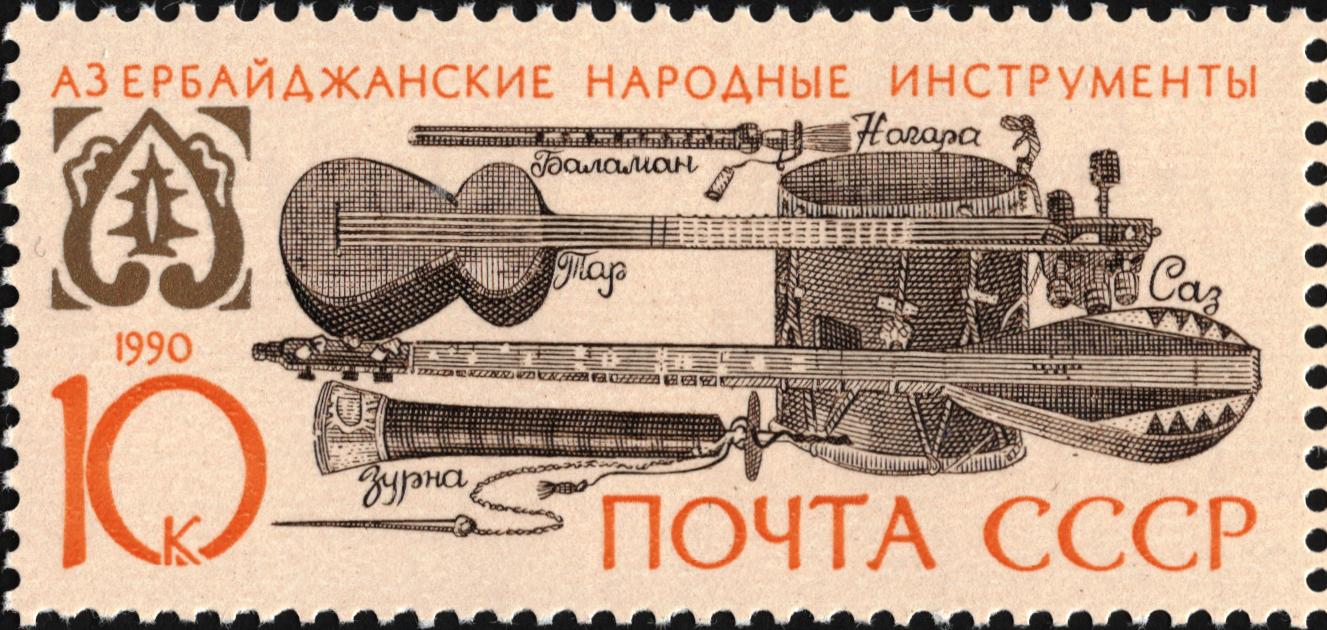
Azerbaijani balanan double-reed pipe, nagara drum, tar, saz and zurna (oboe or shawm).

=== Percussion instruments ===
Naghara is cylinder shaped instrument played with hands or sticks and made of membrane or leather of animals. The base of the naghara is wooden and made of walnut, mulberry or apricot trees. There are a number of types of naghara such as, goltug naghara, bala naghara and manual naghara. Gosha naghara are two joined nagharas with the same height but different sized, which is usual for Azerbaijani music.

Classical mugham instrument ghaval (also called daf) is shallow round shaped drum. The frame surrounded by metal rings inside.

=== Wind instruments ===
The wind instrument balaban (also sometimes called as balaman) is widely used in ceremonies. The origin of the word comes from “bala” – little, “ban” – sound of cockcrow. Balaban carved from the trees of walnut, mulberry, apricot or pear. The length of the instrument is up to 30 centimeters. The main body of the instrument consisted of the eight holes and there is a hollow in the lower part of the balaban. During the performances, players use their fingers by blowing the instrument. Sound effects are created regarding to the air flows from the holes.

Ney is considered as an ancient wind musical instrument and the main body of the instrument is made from one piece of reed. The ney is 55-60 centimeters long. There are five holes on the front side of the body and one in the back.

There are two types of tutak such as, small and large tutaks in Azerbaijan. The front side has seven and the back side has six holes. The body of the instrument is made from a piece of walnut, mulberry, apricot trees or reed. The length of the finished barrel is 28-30 centimeters and the diameter – 20mm. The main difference between the tutak and other Azerbaijani wind instruments its sound is mild.

Zurna is an instrument that is widely used in Azerbaijan. The word zurna consists of two parts: “sur” (great party) and “nay” (reed). The 302–317 mm long body is carved from the trees of walnut, mulberry or apricot trees and the width of the mouth pieces is 20 mm and extends in the end portion up to 65 mm. According to the archeological excavations there is found four pipes made from deer horn in Mingachevir.

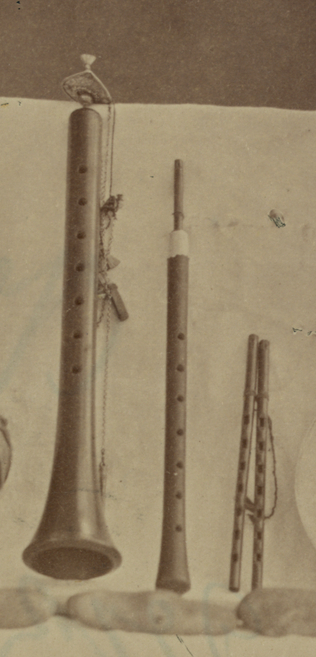
From left: zurna, bülban, and koşnai, Russian Turkestan 1865 to 1872. Tubular reed split from top downward.
