= Elşad Xose =

Azerbaijani rapper (born 1979)

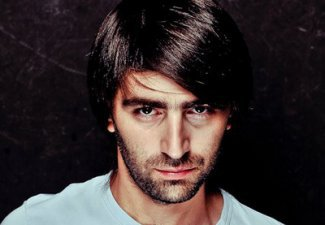
- Elşad Xose

Background information
- Also known as: Elşad Xose, Hose
- Born: Elşad Əliyev; September 25, 1979 (age 46)
- Origin: Baku, Azerbaijan
- Genres: Hip hop
- Occupation: Rapper
- Years active: 1999 - present

Elshad Aliyev (born September 25, 1979 in Baku), better known by his stage name Elşad Xose, is an Azerbaijani rapper. He is one of the most commercially famous and influential Azerbaijani rappers.

== Early career ==
Aliyev developed interest in rap during his school times and chose the nickname Xose. He started to perform in a rap duo with Russian rapper Pauk under the name of "D.U" and most of his songs were part of his first album Жизнь не меняется.

== Music career ==
=== Canlı yayım ===
In 2002, he released the album called "Canlı yayım", which sold 2500 copies in first 3 days

== Personal life ==
In 2007, Xose was arrested for misdemeanor, heroin use and possession. He was sentenced to 1.5 years but later, the case was cleared.

He was married to Azerbaijani dancer Oksana Rasulova but their relationship ended in a divorce.

== Albums ==
- Жизнь не меняется (2000)
- Canlı yayım (2002)
- Plagiat (2003)
- Hәr Atdığım Addım (2004)
- Ixlas (2005)
- Hip-Hop Namә (2008)
- Insaf (2011)
