= Abulhasan Alakbarzadeh =

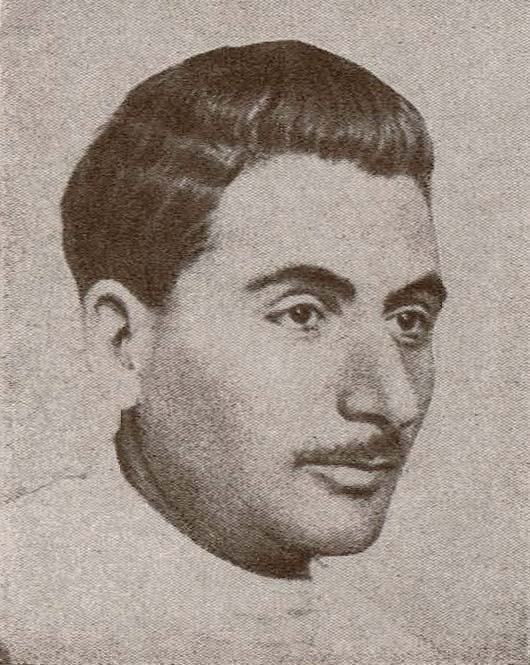

Abulhasan Alibaba oglu Alakbarzadeh (Azerbaijani: Əbülhəsən Ələkbərzadə; 1906 in Basqal, near Ismayilli – 1986 in Baku) was a Soviet Azerbaijani writer known under the pen- name Abulhasan, People's Writer of Azerbaijan (1979).

He is father of the Azerbaijani writer and journalist Chingiz Alakbarzadeh and grandfather of singer Sevda Alakbarzadeh.

== Creativity ==
He was known as an outstanding prose writer in the 20th century, creating many Azerbaijani Soviet novels. He was engaged in artistic creativity for more than 40 years and was the author of works such as "Sofi", "Yokhuslar", "Dunya kopur", "Fathers and Sons", "Wounded", etc.

He also touched on issues of women's freedom in his work, opposed the violation of women's rights, and included images of free women in his works.
