= Chingiz Alakbarzadeh =

- Born: 17 October 1936
- Died: 7 January 1999
- Occupation: journalist, writer

Chingiz Abulhasan oghlu Alakbarzadeh (Azerbaijani: Çingiz Əbülhəsən oğlu Ələkbərzadə) was a journalist and writer.

== Biography ==
He was born on October 17, 1936, in Baku. As a young man, he wished to become a musician. However, his father, Abulhasan Alakbarzadeh, disapproved, and so Chingiz Abulhasan studied philology at the Azerbaijan State University. After graduating, Chingiz worked as a teacher and editor of the newspapers Işiq and Zəhmətkeş. He then became head of the news department at the Azerbaijan State Television and Radio Company.

Chingiz Abulhasan's work includes the books Yarpaqlar tokuləndə, Gullələr dənizdə sonur, Qızıl yəhərli at, Vulkan, Zindan, and his autobiography, Türmə mənim ahımdır.

In 1986, Chingiz Alakbarzadeh was illegally sentenced to two years and eight months in prison. He was released in 1988. His time in prison influenced his writing of Zindan and Türmə mənim ahımdır.
