= Tatyana Snezhina =

Russian poet and singer-songwriter

- Recording songs in a studio

Background information
- Born: Tatyana Valeryevna Pechyonkina; 14 May 1972; Voroshilovgrad
- Died: 21 August 1995 (aged 23) Novosibirsk Oblast
- Genre: pop
- Occupations: poet, singer-songwriter
- Years active: 1993 – 1995
- Label: Melodiya

Tatyana Valeryeva Pechyonkina (Russian: Татьяна Валерьевна Печёнкина,Ukrainian: Тетяна Валеріївна Печьонкіна; 14 May 1972 – 21 August 1995), better known by her stage name Tatyana Snezhina (Russian: Татьяна Снежина) was a Russian poet and singer-songwriter of Ukrainian origin. She wrote more than 200 songs which were performing by herself and – after her death – by many Russian popular artists.

== Early life ==
Tatyana was born in Voroshilovgrad on 14 May 1972. Her father was a military commissioned officer. Her mother was a technologist at the factory. Soon after her birth, the family moved to Petropavlovsk-Kamchatsky, where Tatyana attended the school No.4 and started to study in a local music school. In 1981, the family moved to Moscow. In that period, she began to perform self-penned songs. In 1992, the family moved to Novosibirsk. Tatyana enrolled at the Novosibirsk medical institute.

== Professional singer career ==
In 1993, Tatyana took the pseudonym Snezhina and started working on her first album "Вспомни со мной" (English: Remember with me) contained 21 songs written by Tatyana. In 1994, she first performed on a stage of the Moscow State Estrada Theatre. She was the subject of the report on the Radio Rossii.

She met Sergey Bugayov, record producer and the head of a recording studio, and he became her producer. Soon, they began an affair. They were planning on getting married on 13 September 1995.

== Death ==
Tatyana Snezhina, Sergey Bugayov and 4 other people died in a collision with a truck at 106th kilometer of the R256 highway, located in Cherepanovsky District of Novosibirsk Oblast, on 21 August 1995.

Initially, she was buried in Zayeltsovskoye Cemetery in Novosibirsk but subsequently reburied in Troyekurovskoye Cemetery in Moscow.

== After death ==
In 1997, Alla Pugacheva performed the Tatyana Snezhina song "Позови меня с собой" (English: Call me to come with you) at the Slavianski Bazaar Festival, and it became a hit record. In 2015, the lyrics of this song took 23rd place in the top-100 of the most famous Russian poetry in the history.

In late 1990s – early 2000s, the songs written by Tatyana Snezhina were performed by many famous artists, such as Joseph Kobzon, Kristina Orbakaitė, Lolita Milyavskaya, Mikhail Shufutinsky, Lada Dance, Lev Leshchenko, Alisa Mon, Tatiana Bulanova, etc.

== Legacy ==
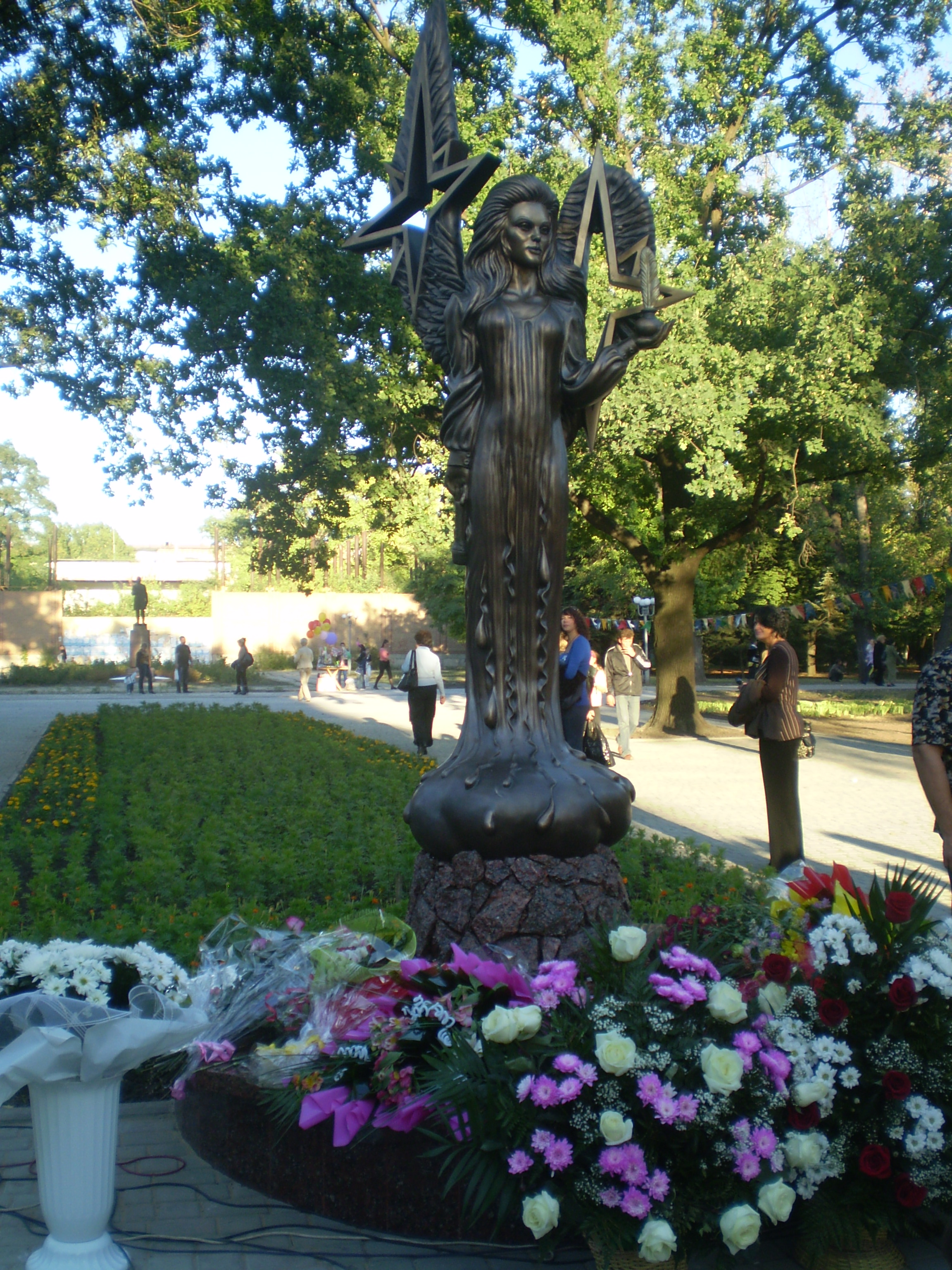
The monument to Tatyana Snezhina in Luhansk

- In 1998, one of peaks of Altai Mountains (44° 58' 30.313" N; 79° 19' 55.247" E) was named after Tatyana Snezhina.
- Since 2008, Novosibirsk has held an annual Television Young Song Performers Contest "Ordynka" dedicated to the memory of Tatyana Snezhina and Sergey Bugayev.
- In 2010, the bronze monument to Tatyana Snezhina was opened in Luhansk.
- In 2011, one of the streets in Novosibirsk was named after Tatyana Snezhina.
- In 2013, the monument to Tatyana Snezhina was opened in Novosibirsk.
