= Berent Kavaklıoğlu =

Turkish basketball player (born 1986)

Free Agent
- Position: Point guard

Personal information
- Born: May 4, 1986 (age 40) Ankara, Turkey
- Listed height: 6 ft 1 in (1.85 m)
- Listed weight: 176 lb (80 kg)

Career information
- Playing career: 2002–present

Career history
- 2002–2008: TED Ankara Kolejliler
- 2008–2009: Kepez Belediye
- 2009–2010: Hacettepe Üniversitesi
- 2010–2011: Erdemir
- 2011–2015: TED Ankara Kolejliler
- 2015–2016: Ankara DSİ
- 2016–2017: Muratbey Uşak Sportif
- 2017–2018: Ankara DSİ
- 2018–2019: Afyon Belediye

Ali Berent Kavaklıoğlu (born May 4, 1986) is a Turkish professional basketball player, who lastly played for as a point guard for Afyon Belediye of the Turkish Basketball League.
