= Faig Aghayev =

Azerbaijani singer (born 1971)

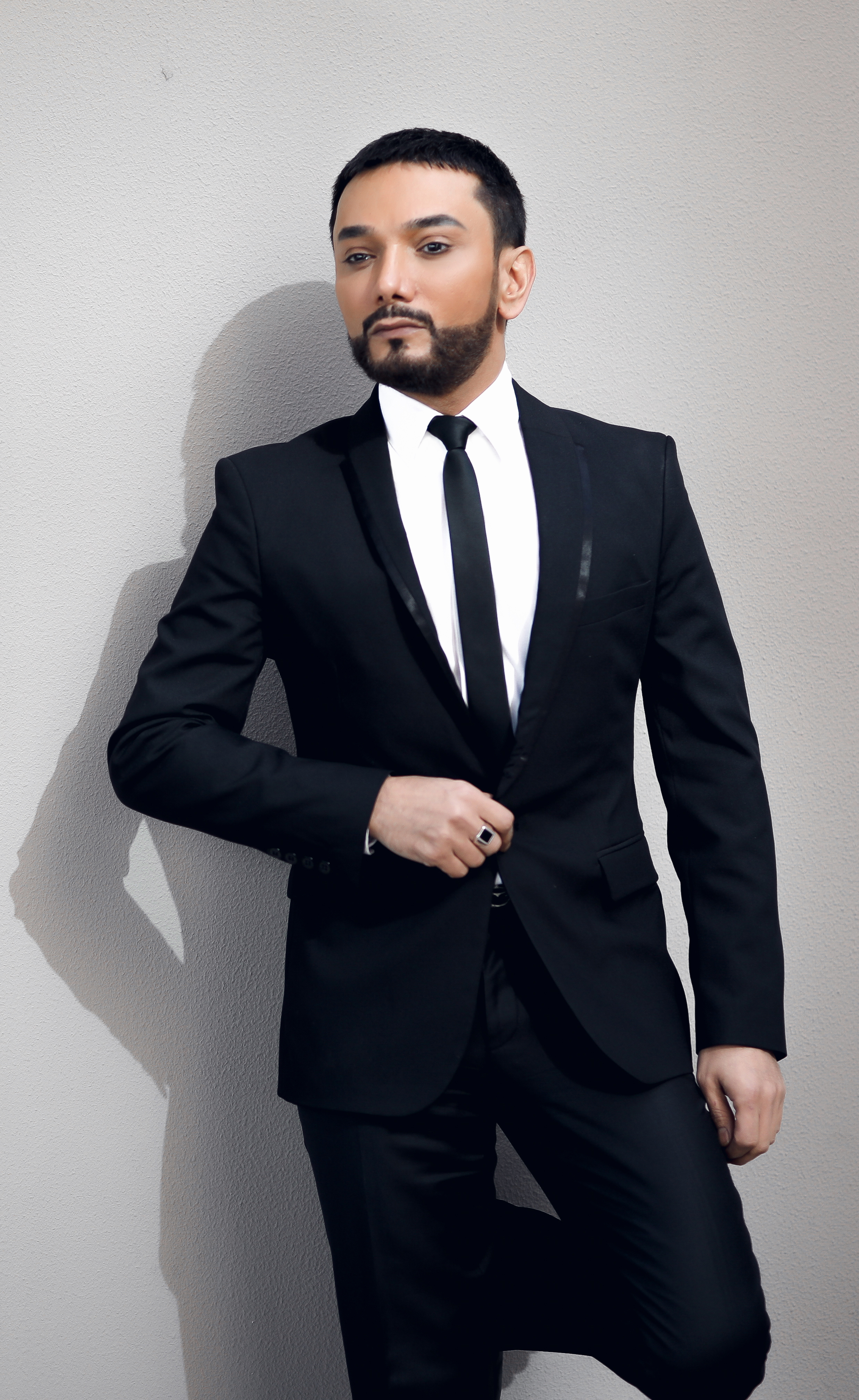
- Aghayev in 2020

Background information
- Born: 29 December 1971 (age 54); Baku, Azerbaijan SSR, Soviet Union
- Genres: Pop
- Occupation: Singer
- Years active: 1988–present
- Website: Faig Aghayev

Faig Balagha oghlu Aghayev (Azerbaijani: Faiq Balağa oğlu Ağayev, born 29 December 1971) is an Azerbaijani pop singer and the People's Artiste of Azerbaijan since 2008. Aghayev received the nickname "Mister Gold Schlager" by his fans.

== Career ==
Aghayev debuted at the "Bakı Payızı 1988" ("Baku Autumn 1988") musical contest, where he won first place.

During his time at university, he gained recognition as a singer, winning multiple musical contests, including the "Qızıl payız 1989" ("Golden Autumn 1989") contest, "Vitebsk 1990" international contest, and the "Yalta 1992" international television song contest.

After graduating from the Azerbaijan State University of Culture and Art in 1993, he continued participating in contests and was placed first in "Kharkov 1995" and "Golden Hit."

In 1995, his first album, Ola bilməz (It Can't Be) was produced. It was the first in a series of albums, such as Səni əvəz eləmir (None Can Replace You) in 1996, Vəfasızım (My Faithless) in 1998, Faiq Ağayev – Seçmələr (The Best of Faig Aghayev) in 1999, Minilliyin sonu (The End of Millennium) in 2000, in 2004 Tam məxfi (Top Secret) and in 2006 Faiq Ağayev - Albom Kolleksiyası (Album Collection).

Since 1996, Aghayev has been the soloist of Azerbaijan State Television and Radio Company (AzTV). In 2012–2013 he was also the soloist of the Azerbaijan State Mugham Theatre.

In 2013, 2015, and 2018, Aghayev was a member of Azerbaijan's national jury at the Eurovision Song Contest. He was the spokesperson for the presentation of points for Azerbaijan at the Eurovision Song Contest 2019.

He was also the coach at The Voice of Azerbaijan contest in 2015.

== Awards ==
In 1998, Aghayev won the Concert of the Year Humay National Music Award.

In 1999, Aghayev won Music Video of the Year Humay award for "Dəşti" ("Dashtee") music video as well as the Grand Award for Singer of the Year.

On 28 October 2000, by the decree of Heydar Aliyev, the President of Azerbaijan, Aghayev was awarded with the honorary title of Honored Artist of Azerbaijan. He was also the winner of Qızıl Mikrofon ("Golden Microphone") National Music Award for Singer of the Year.

In 2001, he was the winner of Grand National Musical Award in three nominations, including Singer of the Year, Concert of the Year ("Əsrin ve minilliyin son konserti" - "The last concert of the century and the millennium") and Album of the Year (Minilliyin sonu - The End of the Millennium).

On 17 September 2008, the President of Azerbaijan Ilham Aliyev awarded Aghayev the honorary title of People's Artist of Azerbaijan.

In April 2019, Faig Aghayev was appointed a member of arts council of Azad Azerbaijan TV channel.

== Discography ==
Title	Album details	Peak chart positions
Title	Album details	Az
Ola bilməz (It Can't Be)	Release date: 1995	
Səni əvəz eləmir (None Can Replace You)	Release date: 1996	
Vəfasızım (My Faithless)	Release date: 1998	
Faiq Ağayev – Seçmələr (The Best of Faig Aghayev)	Release date: 2000	
Minilliyin sonu (The End of Millennium)	Release date: 2000	
Tam məxfi (Top Secret)	Release date: 2004	
