= İkinci Nügədi =

- Municipality
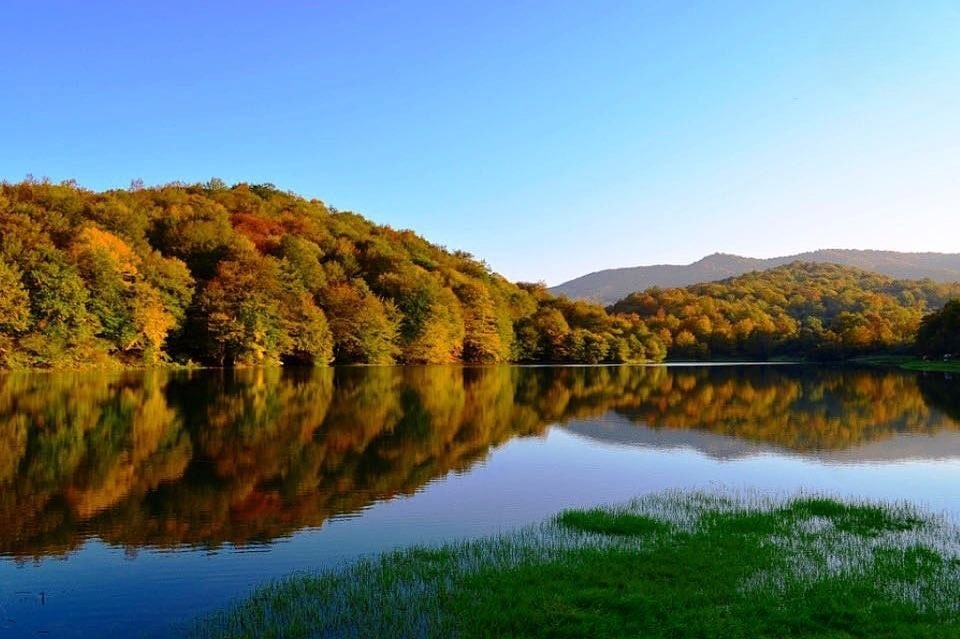

- Location within Azerbaijan
- Coordinates: 41°18′54″N 48°35′09″E
- Country: Azerbaijan
- Rayon: Quba

Population
  - Total: 7,952
- Time zone: UTC+4 (AZT)
  - Summer (DST): UTC+5 (AZT)

İkinci Nügədi (also known as Nügədi, Nyugedi Vtoryye, or Vtoryye Nyugedy) is a village and the most populous municipality, except for the capital Quba, in the Quba Rayon of Azerbaijan. It has a population of 7,952.
