= Sevda Alekbarzadeh =

Azerbaijani singer (born 1977)

- Born: July 4, 1977 (age 48); Baku, Azerbaijan
- Genres: Jazz, folk music, mugam
- Occupation: Singer-songwriter
- Website: www.sevda.info

Sevda Alekbarzadeh (Azerbaijani: Sevda Ələkbərzadə; born July 4, 1977) is an Azerbaijani singer.

== Biography ==
Sevda's grandfather, Abulhasan Alakbarzadeh, is a national writer of Azerbaijan and author of the first Azerbaijani novel written in the Soviet period. Her father, Chingiz Alakbarzadeh, was a famous journalist and writer.

Sevda's voice is difficult to mix up with another's; it's strong and thick, with special guttural notes. This is notwithstanding the fact that her style of singing embraces many possible elements; one can discern in it both soul music and jazz, new wave, and even African griots. Sevda was interested in trying to learn everything; both techniques of traditional "khanende" singing (lessons of legendary singer Alim Gasimov proved a help) and opera bel canto (she went for probation period to Florence, Italy in 2005 not in vain). The most important feature that has always characterized the singer's performance is a high degree of emotional contribution. Sevda Alekperzade comes from a family where culture was objective and predestination of everybody. She and her sister started to take a great interest in singing from childhood. When Sevda was only 14 and Elmira - 18, they came to Aypara group that was formed and led by Vagif.
