= Natavan Habibi =

Azerbaijani singer, actress, and TV presenter (born 1981)

- Also known as: Natavan Həbibi; Nataone
- Born: Natavankhanim Shamil qizi Habibova; 20 May 1981 (age 45); Krasnovodsk, Turkmen SSR, Soviet Union
- Genres: Pop; R&B
- Occupations: Singer; actress; television presenter
- Instrument: Vocals
- Years active: 1999-present

Natavankhanim Shamil qizi Habibova (Note: Azerbaijani: Natavanxanım Şamil qızı Həbibova) (born 20 May 1981), known professionally as Natavan Habibi (Note: Azerbaijani: Natavan Həbibi) and Nataone, is an Azerbaijani singer, actress, and television presenter.

== Early life ==
Habibi was born on 20 May 1981 in Krasnovodsk, Turkmenistan. In 1987, she went to the first grade of school number 12. She later graduated from a 9-year music school. In August 1996, she moved to Baku with her family.

== Career ==
In 1999, Habibi met Vagif Gerayzadeh and started working in the pop group W-Trio together with Roya Aykhan and Elnara Khalilova. She started her solo career in 2006 and her first solo song was "Men Sani Itirse". The first music video was shot for this song while the video for the song "Ulduzlar yandı" (The stars are lit) was shot in Italy. Habibi achieved greater success with her music video, and her first album was also associated with the title of this song. Habibi, who stood out for her style, later made interesting clips for the songs "Sadəcə bulud", "Ehtiyacim var" and "Etirazim var" in Moscow. She was the host of several programs.

Habibi performed the songs "Habibi" and "Ehsas jadid" in Arabic. The song "Habibi" was created during the cooperation with the world-famous and well-known producer Maksim Fadeyev. In 2008, she starred in the film "Ayrılıq imiş" together with Izzat Bagirov. Taking the lead role in the film, she played the role of a young girl named Narmin.

In June 2011, Habibi represented Azerbaijan at Türkçevizyon, a festival attended by Turkic-speaking peoples. On 24 May 2014, a solo concert program called "LISTEN" took place on the stage of Heydar Aliyev Palace, and in September, a concert took place in "Crystal Hall". The singer, who performed the soundtrack of the movie "Zaman nama qatar" shot in 2015, presented her hits "Başima bala", "Sen", "Istarem" to her fans, as well as "Anlayamadım", composed by herself. She made the international festival more memorable by taking the stage at the opening ceremony of the "Cultural capital of the Turkish world - Shaki 2016" in April. In 2017, she was invited to play the lead role in the new romantic comedy film "Hozu".

== Personal life ==
In 2017, Habibi married rapper Dado Aliyev, known mononymously as Dado. They have a son.

Habibi was accepted as a member of the New Azerbaijan Party on 28 April 2011.
