= Brilliant Dadashova =

Azerbaijani pop singer

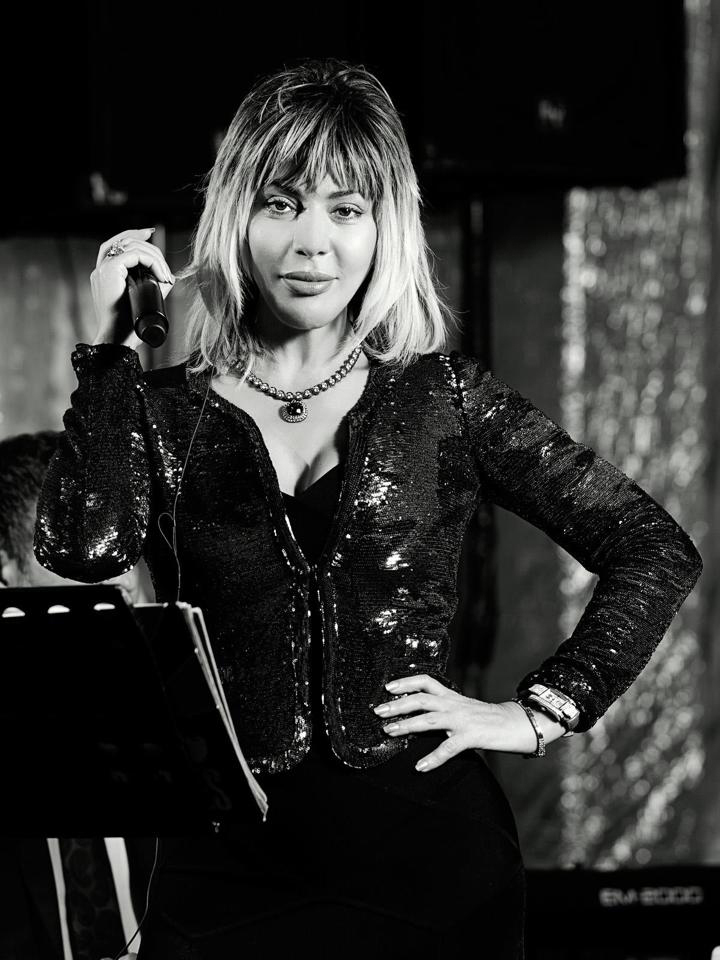

Background information
- Born: 15 September 1959 (age 66) or 15 September 1965 (age 60); Baku, Azerbaijan SSR, USSR
- Genres: Pop; Folk
- Years active: 1985–present

Brilliant Suleyman gyzy Dadashova (Azerbaijani: Brilliant Süleyman qızı Dadaşova [bɾiˈljɑnt sylejˈmɑn ɡɯˈzɯ dɑˈdɑʃovɑ]; born 15 September 1959 (or 1965, according to other sources) is an Azerbaijani pop singer.

== Life ==
In 1986, she participated in the annual International Youth Festival in Moscow. Two years later, she won the All-Union Pop Singers Contest, a singing competition among representatives of the republics of the Soviet Union. In 1990, she graduated from the Azerbaijan National Culture and Arts Institute.

In 1995, her song "Züleyha" hit the top 10 in Russian charts. In 1997, Dadashova was among the musicians in the album Landet vi kommer fra ("The Land We Came From", released by Kirkelig Kulturverksted in Norway), which included Azerbaijani folk songs sung in Azerbaijani and Norwegian by the Azerbaijani soloists and the Norwegian choir SKRUK.

In 1999 Dadashova was elected to the Baku City Council.

In 2012 her song "Vokaliz" (a 2001 vocal improvisation of the Azerbaijani folk dance tunes "Meydan" and "Baki", as well as Vagif Garayzadeh's "Novruzu" musical composition) became an issue of controversy after allegedly having been performed by the Armenian singer Varduhi Vardanyan, who was accused of violating copyright. Vardanyan vehemently denied the accusations and said that the song is a traditional Armenian folk song.

Her seventh album, Saninlayam ("I'm with You"), was released in September 2002, and was dedicated to the memory of composer Rafig Babayev. She released another studio album, titled Masal Dunyam, in Azerbaijan and Turkey in August 2008. The song "Per sempre" with Adriano Celentano was published in 2021.

Dadashova is married to stage actor Adalat Hajiyev and has a son. In March 2011, she announced that she had filed for divorce due to a long-term complicated relationship. They were married in the late 1980s and were still married as of 2020.
