= Zulfiyya Khanbabayeva =

Azerbaijani singer and performer (born 1967)

- Born: Zülfiyyə Güloğlan qızı Xanbabayeva; 16 October 1967 (age 58); Baku, Azerbaijan SSR, USSR
- Origin: Quba, Azerbaijan
- Genres: Pop
- Occupation: Singer
- Instrument: Vocals
- Years active: 1988–present
- Labels: Z.X Records, BMF, WAVE
- Website: www.zulfiyya.com

Zulfiyya Khanbabayeva (Azerbaijani: Zülfiyyə Xanbabayeva, born 16 October 1967) is an Azerbaijani singer and performer.

== Biography ==
=== Childhood - “Bakı Payızı” ===
Zulfiyya Khanbabayeva was born on 16 October 1967 in Baku. They were three children in the family: two girls, one boy. From early years, she had an interest in music, and she loved to sing for her grandparents, and had some little concerts.

Zulfiyya studied at school #161. In school years she was singing in Afsar Javanshirov chorus. First time when newspapers wrote about her she was only 12, that time for the poem "Shabi Hicran" (Şəbi-Hicran) by the greatest Azeri poet Fuzûlî in Uzeyir Hajibeyov home-museum. Zulfiyya learned from her mother Azeri national folk music. She decided to be a singer or actress, although her father wished to see her as a student of Foreign Languages Institute. After school she entered Theater Director faculty. In her student years she directed some plays and played a little roles. The same years she became friends with - Nigar, and today Nigar Hajizadeh is Zulfiyya's producer. In 1987 Nigar acquainted her with Brilliant Dadashova. Brilliant listened to her and liked her singing. She told great Azeri composer Javanshir Guliev to listen to Zulfiyya. Javanshir Guliev saw her talent, and so began to work with Zulfiyya xanim. In 1989 Zulfiyya participated in Bakı Payızı 88 song contest with the Vagif Gerayzadeh song “Səni Xatırlayarkən” (Remembering You) and entered final.

=== Aypara - Zulfiyya today ===
In 1994 Zulfiyya sang in Vagif Gerayzadeh group Aypara. After leaving the group Zulfiyya started a solo career as singer. Her first album released in 2000 year was titled Gecə (Night) and became the best-selling album of the year in Azerbaijan. She released 2 music videos from this album. In 2002 she released her second studio album Sən Gedən Gündən (Since You've Been Gone) with 3 music videos. Her third studio album Qəlbinə Yol (The Way To Your Soul) released in 2003 year. Music video for title song was the most expensive music video of all times for Azeri show business. From this album one music video was released. The fourth studio album named Sənsiz (Without You) was released in December 2004, but was given to stores on 2–5 January 2005. She released 4 music videos from this album and all became #1 in all national charts. In 2005 she gave 6 concert-programs in the frame of her "Canım Məmləkətim" tour (My Dear Land) in 6 cities of Azerbaijan. She was named Deserve Artist of Azerbaijan Republic in November 2003. On 17 September 2008 she was named National Artist of Azerbaijan Republic by President of Azerbaijan Republic. She is married. On 26 October 2007, Deniz, Zulfiyya's daughter was born. First photos of Zulfiyya Khanbabayeva and her daughter were published by OK Azerbaijan magazine.

== Music career ==
=== Studio albums ===
2000 - “Gecə” (The Night)
2002 - “Sən Gedən Gündən” (Since You've Been Gone)
2003 - “Qəlbinə Yol” (The Way To Your Heart)
2004 - “Sənsiz” (Without You)
2009 - “Dəniz” (The Sea)

=== Music Videos ===
1999 - “Demirəm”
1999 - “Gecikməyin Sevməyə”
2000 - “Aləm Oyansın”
2001 - “Sən Gedən Gündən”
2002 - “Son Gecə”
2003 - “Sənsiz”
2003 - “Qəlbinə Yol”
2004 - “Səninlə”
2004 - “Azərbaycan”
2005 - “Ayrılığa Dözərəm”
2006 - “Gözümün Qarası”
2006 - “Xatırla Məni”
2007 - “Mənimsən”
2010 - “Unut Getsin”
2010 - “Nə Faydası”
2013 - “Sən Azərbaycanlısan”
2014 - “İki Doğma İnsan”
2017 - “Melancholia”
2017 - “Etiraf”
