= Röya =

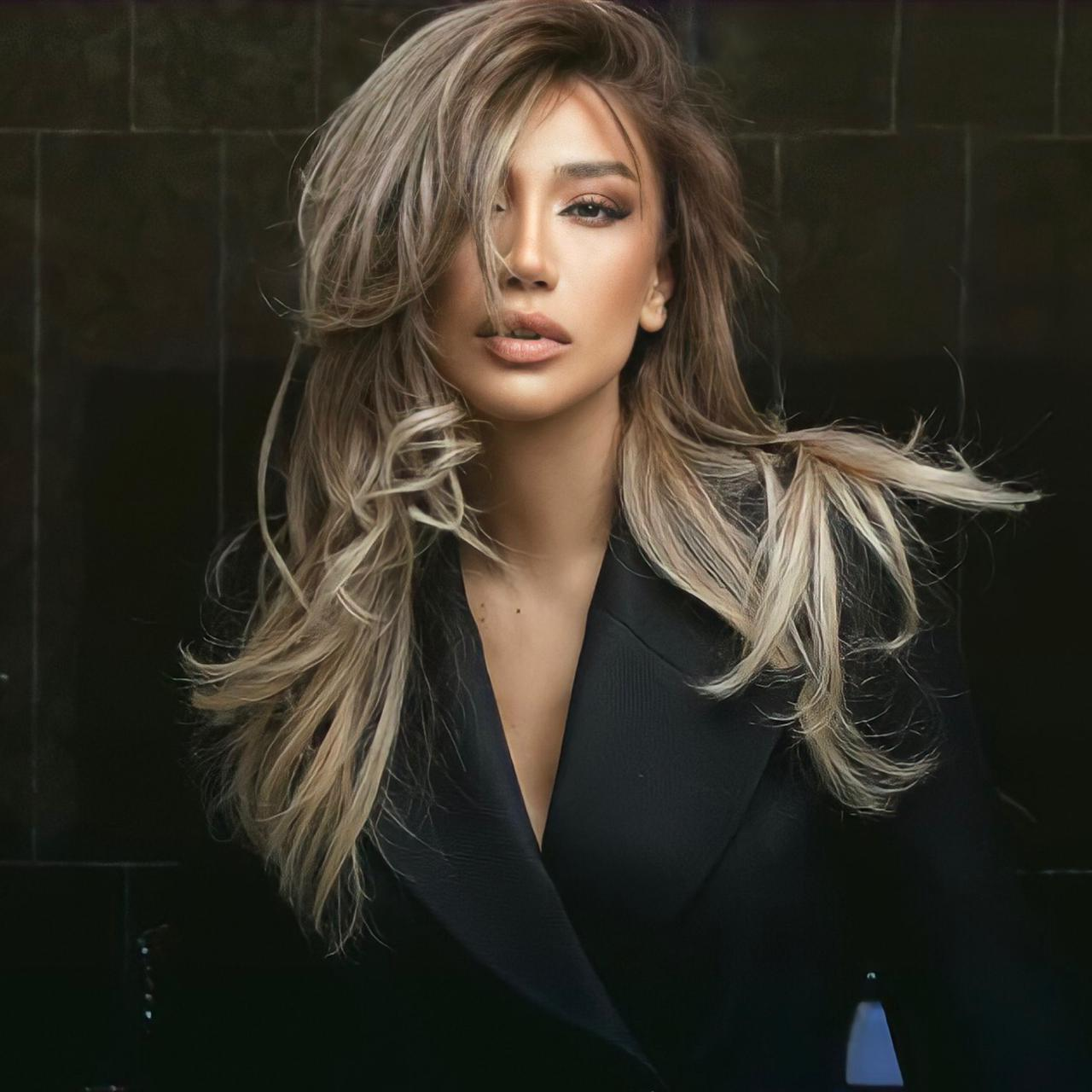

Background information
- Born: Royala Yagub gyzy Najafova; 14 June 1982 (age 44); Baku, Azerbaijan SSR, Soviet Union
- Genre: Pop
- Occupation: Singer
- Instrument: Vocals
- Years active: 1999–present
- Label: BEAT Music
- Website: royaofficial.com

Royala Yagub gyzy Najafova (Azerbaijani: Röyalə Yaqub qızı Nəcəfova), known as Röya Aykhan (Azerbaijani: Röya Ayxan) or simply Röya, is an Azerbaijani pop singer. She is known for her liberal artistic style.

== Career ==
The song "Ay lali yar" got Roya started with her singing career as a member of the W-Trio girls-band in 1999, with two other soloists: Elnara Khalilova and Natavan Habibi. In March 2003, Roya decided to leave the band to pursue a solo career and later, quickly became one of the country's most popular stars, enjoying admiration from a generation of young Azerbaijani fans. Her debut single "Bilersenmi?" was released in early September 2003 and her debut album Söyle was released in May 2004. From 2004, Roya gave nearly 10 solo-performances in Baku and about 15 performances across the country. In 2008, Roya gave two solo-concerts in March and July. In March 2009 she gave 2 live performances in Baku with a chamber orchestra conducted by Teymur Geockchayev. At the same time her third album Bax (Look!) was released in Azerbaijan.

== Personal life ==
From 2008 to 2014, Roya was married to Anar Jalilov, with whom she has a son born in 2009.

== Discography ==
=== Albums ===
- 2003: Röya Kimi
- 2007: Röya, Vol. 1
- 2012: Gönder
- 2013: Gemiciler
- 2015: Kesin Bilgi
- 2016: Yolun Açık Olsun
- 2017: O Konu
- 2018: Feat.
- 2018: Sene Ehtiyacim Var
- 2018: Best Hits
- 2018: Afaki
- 2018: Düşürsen Tez-Tez Yada
- 2019: Slow Compilation
- 2019: Yaz Ayları
- 2019: Röya, Vol. 2
- 2019: Best Compilation, Vol. 1
- 2019: Best Compilation, Vol. 2
- 2019: Best Compilation, Vol. 3
- 2019: Best Compilation, Vol. 4
- 2019: Dedin Yox
- 2020: Olar
- 2020: Hərə Öz Sevdiyini Çağırsın
- 2021: Qış Yuxusu
- 2022: Dəli Kimi
- 2023: 14/41

=== Singles ===
- "Gönder" (2012)
- "Günahsız Günahım" (2013)
- "Gemiciler" (2013)
- "Kesin Bilgi" (ft. Ozan Çolakoğlu) (2015)
- "Yolun Açık Olsun" (2016)
- "Düşürsen Tez-Tez Yada" (2016)
- "O Konu" (with Soner Sarıkabadayı) (2017)
- "Səndən Başqa" (2018)
- "Bilmirdin" (2018)
- "Afaki" (2018)
- "Mənə Sevgindən Bəhs Et" (2018)
- "Problemdi Sevgimiz" (2018)
- "İnsanam" (2018)
- "Kölgə" (feat. Emil Bedelov) (2019)
- "Bağışlaram" (2019)
- "Dama Dama" (2019)
- "Unutmaq Lazım" (2019)
- "Kimin Belə Sevgilisi Var?" (2019)
- "Yaz Ayları" (feat. Amina) (2019)
- "Səni Sevmək Mənə Çok Yaraşır" (2019)
- "Dedin Yox" (2019)
- "Elə Bilirdim" (2019)
- "Nazlı" (2019)
- "Məhkumam" (2019)
- "Влюблена" (2020)
- "Təmənnasız" (2020)
- "Sevgilim" (ft. Miri Yusif) (2020)
- "Xəbərsiz" (2020)
- "Gəlmə Yaxınıma" (with Yashar Jalilov) (2020)
- "Gic Kimi" (2020)
- "Hərə Öz Sevdiyini Çağırsın" (2020)
- "Olar" (feat. Rauf) (2020)
- "Sənə Qədər" (2021)
- "Qış Yuxusu" (2021)
- "Qəribə Dünya" (2021)
- "Dolunay" (2021)
- "Qələbə" (2021)
- "Tövbe Tövbe" (2021)
- "Ağla" (2022)
- "Bir Gün" (with Nuri Serinlendiriji) (2022)
- "Axtarma Məni" (2022)
- "Dəli Kimi" (with Nicat Rəhimov) (2022)
- "Yada Düşürsən" (with Nurəddin Mehdixanlı) (2022)
- "Yuxu Dərmanımdır" (2022)
- "Kart Belə Olar" (with Birbank) (2022)
- "Səni İnsan Sandım" (2022)
- "Bəzən" (with Ceyhun Zeynalov) (2023)

== Extral links ==
- Röya Official's channel on YouTube
