= Azerbaijani hip-hop =

Azerbaijani hip hop (Azerbaijani: Azərbaycan hip-hopu) is the musical genre which became popular in Azerbaijan in the mid-1990s. It is a mix of native meykhana genre of Azerbaijani music with fusion of Western hip hop.

== History ==
The first Azerbaijani hip-hop song "Dünənki keçdi" (Yesterday is Past) was created in 1983 by Chingiz Mustafayev, who would later become Azerbaijan's national hero for unrelated reasons. The pioneer of Azerbaijani rap often associated with name of Anar Nagilbaz in 1992, which also included elements of disco but the popularity of the rap genre came with the rise of Dayirman, which included primarily patriotic elements.

In 2000s, despite mass emergence of independent rappers like Elşad Xose and Huseyn Derya and popularity of hip-hop shows like "Mən də varam" on Space TV, only a few Azerbaijani rap artists have achieved commercial success. During the late 2000s, rap group H.O.S.T. became primarily popular among hip hop fans.

On 29 December 2011, the first Azerbaijani national musical, a hip-hop version of the classic love story Leyli and Majnun, has been performed in Baku. Despite the commercial dominance of hip-hop and Azerbaijani pop music during this period, rapper Miri Yusif found success with his reggae and soul fusion album "Karma", peaked at number 1 in the Azerbaijani Albums Chart in 2010.

== Participants ==
=== Notable artists ===
- Anar Nagilbaz
- Chingiz Mustafayev
- Elşad Xose
- Huseyn Derya
- OKABER
- Qaraqan
- Xpert

=== Groups ===
- Dayirman
- H.O.S.T.

== See also ==
- Meykhana
- Mugham
- Azerbaijani pop music
