= Emin Efendi =

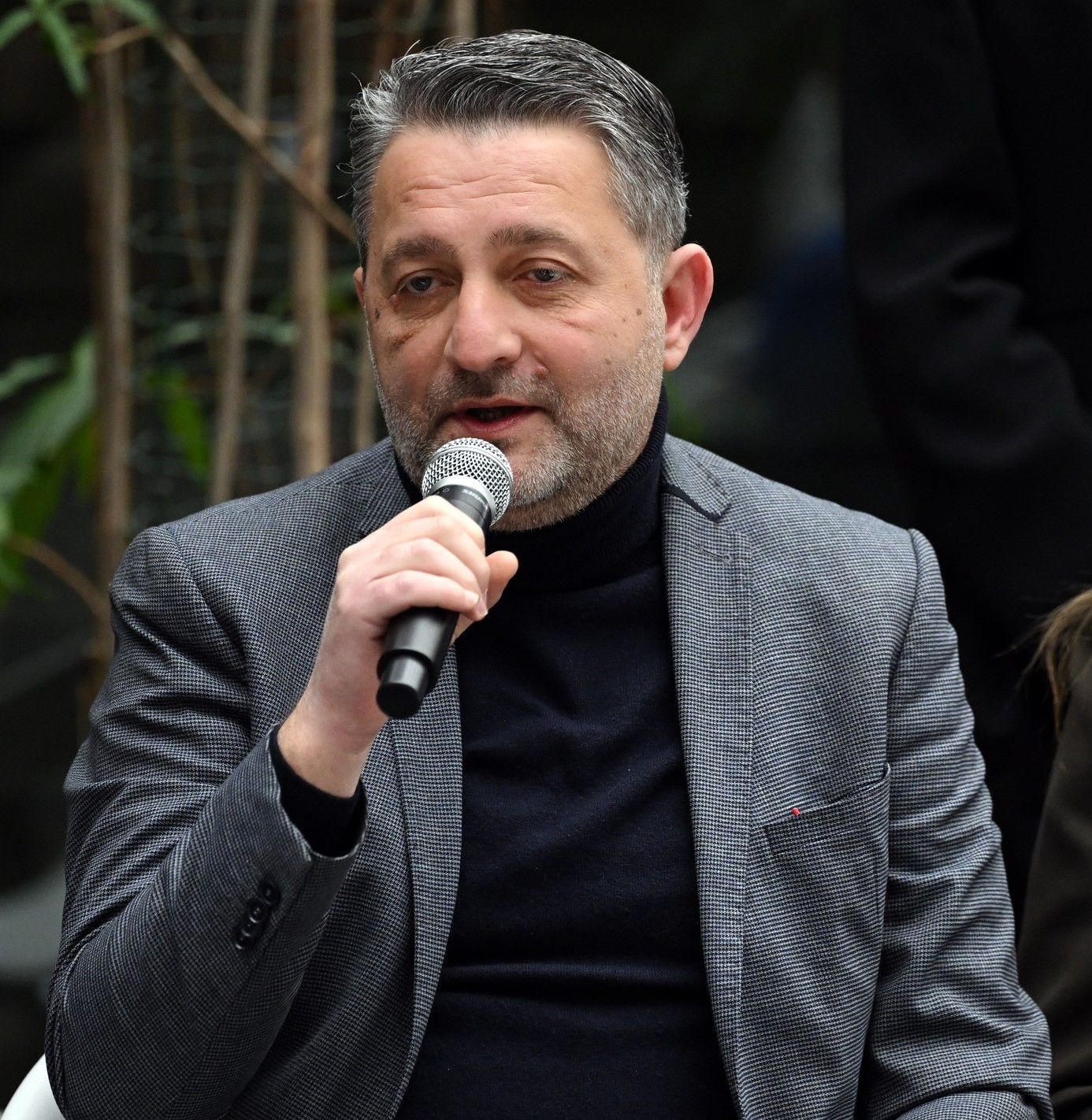

Background information
- Born: 15.11.1978
- Origin: Azerbaijan
- Genre: Hip hop
- Occupation: Producer
- Years active: 1996-present

Emin Efendi (born November 15, 1978, in Baku) is an Azerbaijani producer and television presenter from Baku, Azerbaijan. He founded the Azerbaijani rap group Dayirman and has produced for the rap group H.O.S.T. and singer Miri Yusif.

== Early life ==
Emin Efendi's birth transpired on November 15, 1978, within the city of Baku. His formative years were spent in the "Vasmoy" locale of Baku, specifically the "8 KM" settlement. In 1996, he graduated from Nizami district's School Number 210, subsequently studying at the Azerbaijan University of Architecture and Construction.

== Career ==
He started his career by producing on ANS CM radio. By 2001, he was host for the "De Gelsin" meykhana show. He produced and hosted the televised program "Chardaq," broadcast on Space TV. Over different intervals, he orchestrated opening and closing ceremonies for the Azerbaijan Football Cup finals. In 2011, he produced the opening and closing ceremonies of the World Boxing Championship hosted in Azerbaijan. He was on the jury panel of the "Big Stage" TV program on the ATV TV channel. He was manager and author of the weekly program "Danışır Efendi," in collaboration with ASAN Radio and Azxeber.com.

He hosted the "Bizim kimi" show and the morning radio show "Səhərin Şərhi," broadcast on the "Radio Enerji."
