= Elkhan =

Elkhan is a given name. Notable people with the name include:

- Elkhan Ahmadov (born 1993), Azerbaijani footballer
- Elkhan Astanov (born 2000), Kazakh footballer
- Elxan Həsənov (born 1967), Azerbaijani footballer
- Elkhan Mammadov (judoka) (born in 1982), Azerbaijani judoka
- Elkhan Mammadov (fencer) (born in 1969), Azerbaijani fencer
- Elkhan Nuriyev (born 1969), Azerbaijani political scientist
- Elkhan Polukhov, Azerbaijani diplomat
- Elkhan Suleymanov (born 1974), Azerbaijani weightlifter
- Elkhan Zeynalli, Azerbaijani writer
