= Qurd =

Studio album by Dayirman
- Released: 11 January 2001
- Genre: Hip hop, Azerbaijani hip hop
- Producer: Emin Efendi

Dayirman chronology
| Az@rimeyk | Qurd | Gözümüz sözdür |

Qurd ([ˈɡurt], wolf) is a studio album by the Dayirman. The album contains fifteen compositions based on Azerbaijani hip hop.

== Content ==
=== Subject matter ===
Qurd is a reflective album, featuring Dayirman's more personal and serious side. This change gives the album a lighter tone, a departure from his previous albums. One of the most noticeable changes is the generally lighter lyrical content. Over the course of the album, the group touches on the issues of Karabakh in hip hop ("Ya Qarabağ, Ya Ölüm"), Pan-Turkism ("Turk turke dastak"), the Turan and Tengrism ("Qurd").

== Track listing ==
| No. | Title | Writer(s) | Length |
|---|---|---|---|
| 1. | "Intro" | Dayirman | 0:26 |
| 2. | "Ya Qarabağ, Ya Ölüm" | Ozan Arif | 5:45 |
| 3. | "Mama" | Emin Efendi | 4:02 |
| 4. | "Toppush Gizlar" | Emin Efendi | 4:57 |
| 5. | "Avtosh" | Miri Yusif | 3:54 |
| 6. | "Qurd" | Emin Efendi | 3:07 |
| 7. | "Baku" | Emin Efendi | 3:55 |
| 8. | "Ushag Naghmasi (featuring Sayyah)" | Emin Efendi | 4:10 |
| 9. | "Turk turke dastak (featuring Maho B)" | Emin Efendi, Maho B | 4:02 |
| 10. | "L-günü (featuring Samira)" | L-Mir | 4:56 |
| 11. | "Pul Tap Ver" | Emin Efendi | 2:49 |
| 12. | "Avtosh 2" | Miri Yusif | 4:35 |
| 13. | "Yeri Var" | Emin Efendi | 4:08 |
| 14. | "Kulek" | Shamil | 3:04 |
| 15. | "Outro" | Dayirman | 1:19 |

== Critical reception ==
Qurd received mostly positive ratings from most music critics. Dayirman been praised for their patriotic elements in their songs and helping popularising Azerbaijani hip hop.

== See also ==
- Mugham
- Meykhana
