= Sinima Beats =

Online music licensing company

Sinima Beats is an online music licensing company founded in New York City that distributes instrumentals for songwriters, singers, rappers, film makers, or app developers. Sinima Beats is a registered Broadcast Music, Inc. member as a publisher. "Sinima Beats" is also a registered trademark.

== History ==
Sinima Beats was founded in May 2005 and offers urban, rock, rnb, pop, dance, reggae, dubstep and soundtrack instrumentals through various independent music websites; primarily SoundClick. Sinima Beats began to license its music through the internet to aspiring artists, royalty-free. These licenses give independent artists the opportunity to record songs over instrumentals and commercially distribute their songs without having to pay additional fees. All instrumentals are sample-free and cleared for commercial release.

Eventually, many notable artists and companies used instrumentals by Sinima Beats in their projects. Artists such as DMX, Krizz Kaliko, Stat Quo, Canibus, E-40 and Silkk the Shocker have all recorded over instrumentals produced by Sinima Beats. Subsequently, several instrumentals were placed on popular TV shows such as Keeping up with the Kardashians, The Real World, Road Rules, etc.

== Notable artists ==
- DMX (rapper)
- Fetty Wap
- Krizz Kaliko
- Tory Lanez
- The Game (rapper)
- Stat Quo - Time 2 Get Paid
- Young Buck
- Canibus
- E-40
- Jake Paul
- Soulja Boy
- Silkk the Shocker
- Emcee Kerser
- Bobby Creekwater
- Rhymefest
- Jin (rapper)
- G-Dep
- Steven Jo
- Grafh featuring Face tha Music - Don't Push Me
- Termanology
- Rah Digga
- Capone (rapper)
- Cutty Ranks
- Rashad McCants
- Kempi - Zet Um Op (Baby)
- Hopsin
- Sexion D'Assaut
- Qaraqan
- Goest Ryder

== Companies ==
- Marvel Studios
- Universal Music Group
- Killer Tracks
- Bunim/Murray Productions
- Boost Mobile
- EMI Music Publishing
- MTV
- Lafiosa Enterprise

== TV/Film ==
Instrumentals have been placed as background music on the following TV shows:

- The Wolverine (film) - Trailer
- Jimmy Kimmel Live
- Keeping Up with the Kardashians
- The Spin Crowd
- Kourtney and Khloé Take Miami
- Khloé & Lamar
- Kourtney and Kim Take New York
- The Real World
- The Challenge (TV series)
- Chopped (TV series)
- The Bad Girls Club

== Today ==
Sinima Beats has over 29 million video views according to YouTube with over 100,000 subscribers. They have also achieved over 116.9 million song plays and over 12.8 million page views worldwide on the internet according to their SoundClick statistics.
