= Consulate General of Norway, Houston =

Coordinates: 29.757336°N 95.401410°W

Consulate-General of Norway in Houston
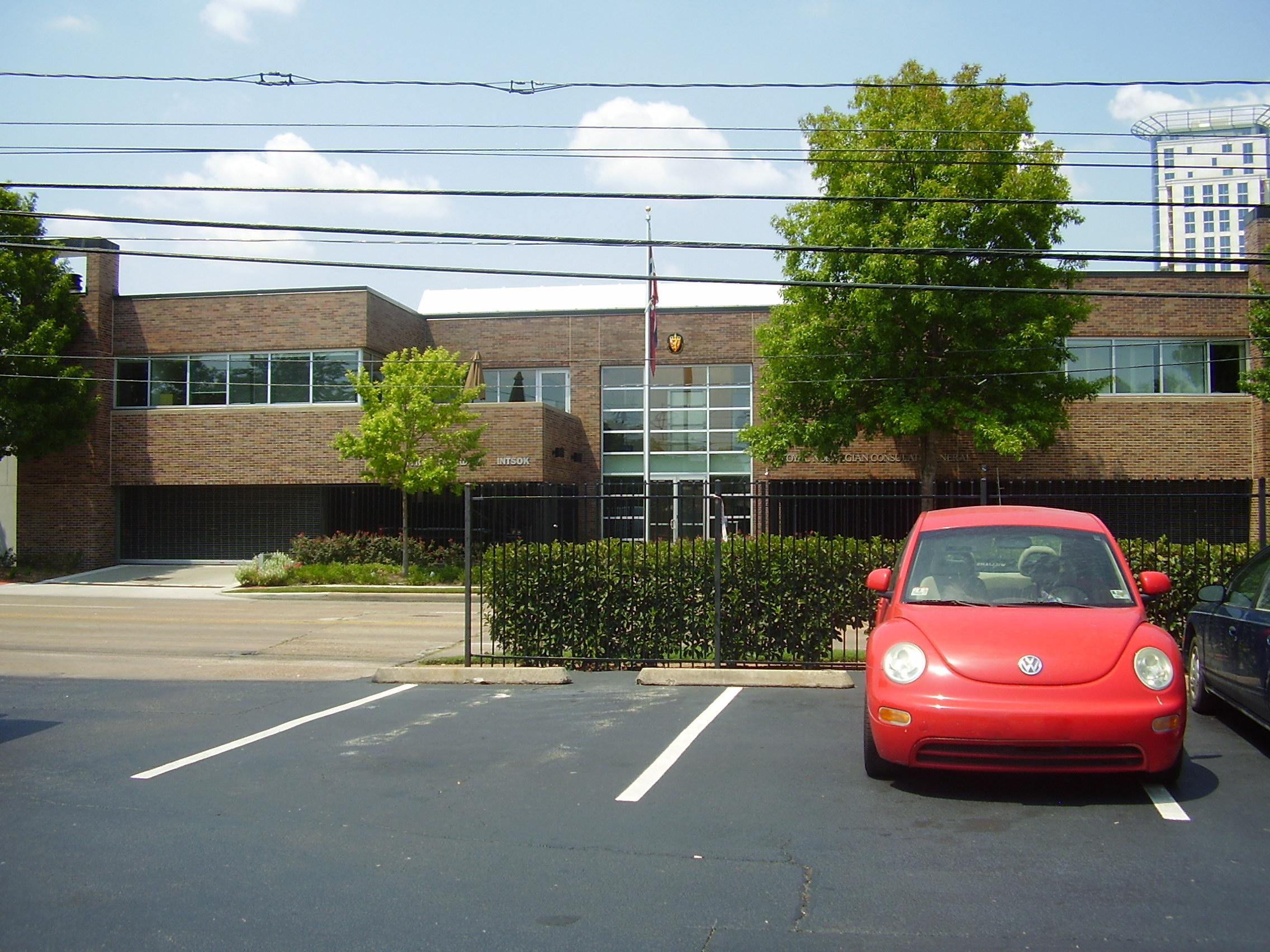
- Norway House, which housed the Consulate-General of Norway in Houston
- Location: Houston, Texas, United States
- Address: 3410 West Dallas street, Suite 100

The Consulate-General of Norway in Houston was Norway's diplomatic mission in Houston, Texas, United States. It was located in the Neartown area.

Petroleum-related business ties formed major connections between Norway and Houston. Lasse Sigurd Seim, former consul general of Norway to Houston, described the estimated 5,000–6,000 Norwegians in the Houston area around 2008 as the largest concentration of Norwegians outside of Scandinavia. About 100 Norwegian companies had business operations in Houston during that year. In 2007 Houston had $1.5 billion United States dollars in trade with Norway.

The Norwegian Consulate General in Houston was permanently closed in July 2023.

== History ==
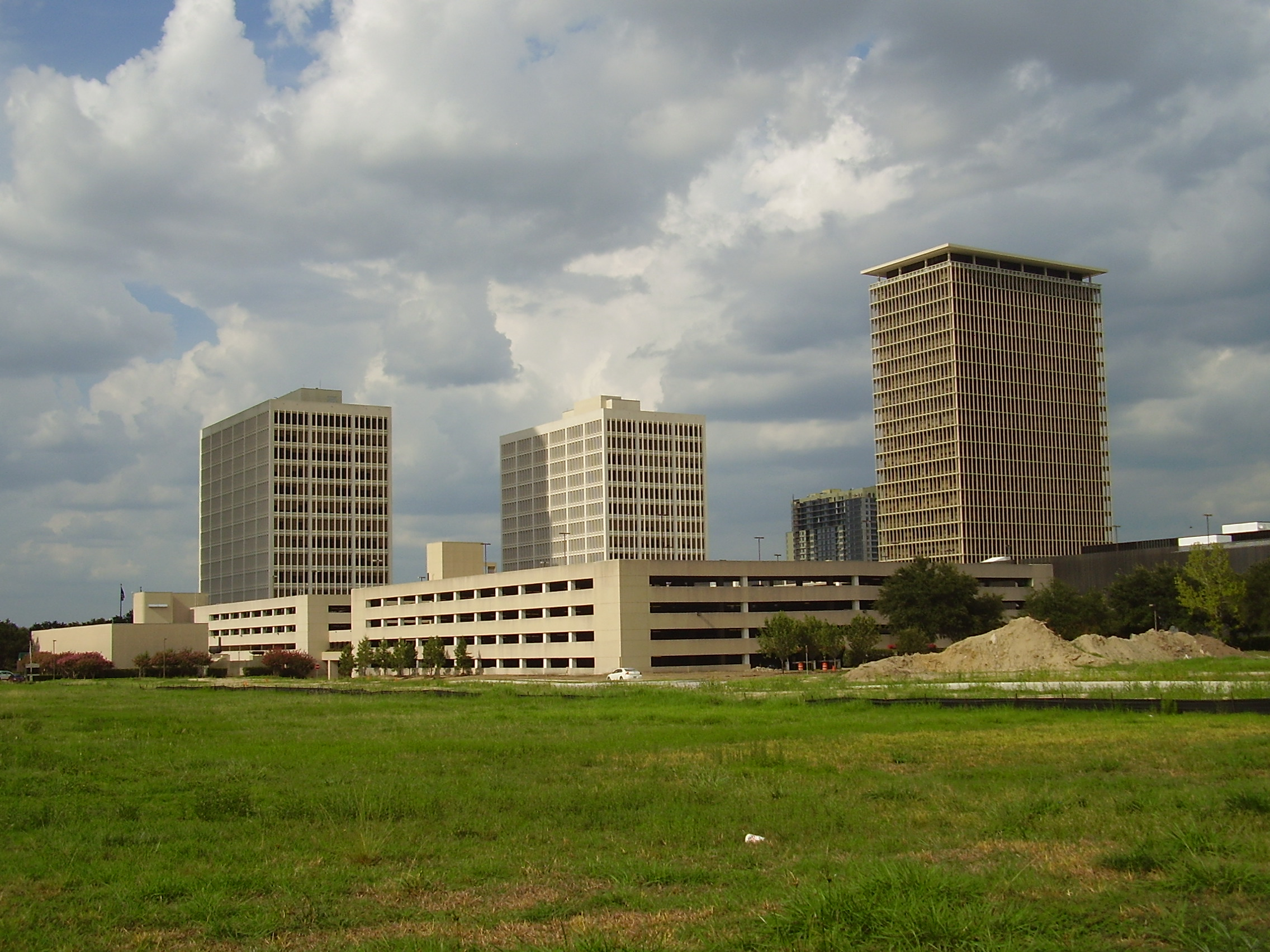
Four of the towers of the American General Center; the Riviana Building used to have offices of the consulate

The consulate first opened in 1977. For a 27-year period, the consulate leased space in the Riviana Building in the American General Center, at 2777 Allen Parkway, in Neartown Houston. Before it moved to its current location, the consulate was located in Suite 1185 in the Riviana Building. Around 2008 the Norwegian consulate announced that it was expanding consular services to a new building.

By 2008 the Norwegian government introduced plans to establish an "incubator" for Norwegian businesses in the Houston area, with the consulate and the Innovation Norway group organizing the incubator facility. The government planned to move the consulate offices into the facility along with small and medium-sized businesses. In 2010, the consulate relocated to the "Norway House," a building in Neartown that also houses Innovation Norway, INTSOK, the Norwegian American Chamber of Commerce (NACC), and several small offices reserved for small and medium-sized Norwegian companies that hope to establish business in Greater Houston. On November 16, 2010 the official opening was held. Trond Giske, the Norwegian Minister of Trade and Industry, attended the opening. The U.S. Green Building Council gave Norway House Leadership in Energy and Environmental Design (LEED) gold certification. Within the United States, Norway House is the first consulate facility and the second diplomatic facility to receive that certification.

== Service area ==
U.S. states within its jurisdiction included Texas, Alabama, Arkansas, Florida, Kansas, Louisiana, Mississippi, Missouri, Nebraska, and Oklahoma. The consulate also covered the U.S. insular areas of Puerto Rico and U.S. Virgin Islands.

It previously served Haiti and Jamaica; consular services for Jamaica and Haiti are now provided by the Norwegian embassy in Havana, Cuba.

== See also ==
- Diplomatic missions of Norway
- Embassy of Norway in Washington, D.C.
- Norway–United States relations
