= Huseyn Derya =

Azerbaijani rapper (1975–2014)

Huseyn Darya
- Born: Hüseyn Cahangir oğlu Muradov; June 29, 1975; Baku Azerbaijan
- Origin: Baku Azerbaijan
- Died: March 15, 2014 (aged 38) Baku Azerbaijan
- Genres: Hip hop
- Occupations: Rapper; actor
- Years active: 1999–2014

Huseyn Muradov (29 June 1975 – 15 March 2014), better known by his stage name Huseyn Derya, was an award-winning Azerbaijani rapper and actor from Baku, Azerbaijan.

== Early life ==
Darya was born on June 29, 1975, in Baku, in the district of Bakikhanov.

He graduated from Baku secondary school No. 4, and was accepted to Baku State University, but at the same time, there was a war in Azerbaijan. He dropped out of university and joined the army. After returning from the war, he continued his career as a musician.

== Accident and Death ==
On March 14, 2014, he was badly injured in a traffic accident, and died on the next day.

== See also ==
- Azerbaijani hip hop
