= Lasse Sigurd Seim =

Norwegian civil servant and diplomat

- Born: 21 May 1943; Bergen, Norway
- Died: 30 March 2024 (aged 80); Oslo, Norway
- Education: University of Oslo
- Occupations: Civil servant, diplomat

Lasse Sigurd Seim (21 May 1943 – 30 March 2024) was a Norwegian civil servant and diplomat.

== Career ==
Seim graduated as cand.real. from the University of Oslo in 1968. He was state secretary at the Ministry of Defence from 1988 to 1989, and was assigned to the Norwegian delegation to the United Nations in New York from 1990 to 1994. He was ambassador to the Czech Republic in Prague from 1999 to 2004, ambassador to Egypt in Cairo from 2004 to 2007, and consul general of Norway to Houston from 2007 to 2010.

== Personal life and death ==
Born in Bergen on 21 May 1943, Seim was a son of educationalist Hjalmar Seim.

Seim died in Oslo on 30 March 2024, aged 80.
