= Elkhan Nuriyev =

Azerbaijani political scientist and recognized expert in Eurasian affairs

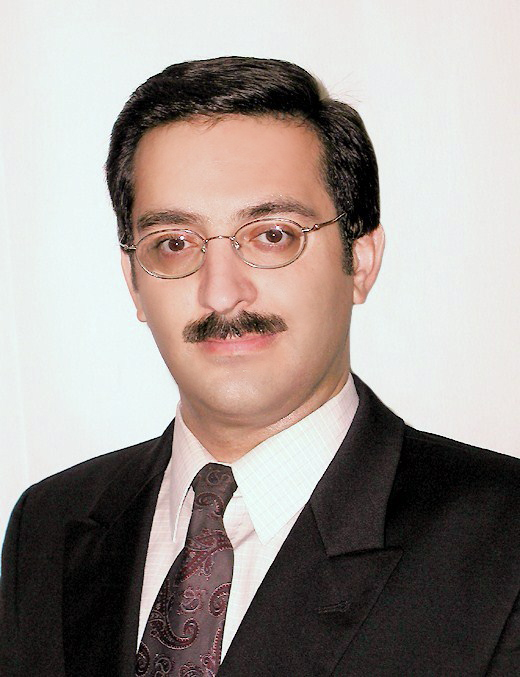
- Born: May 15, 1969 (age 57); Baku, Azerbaijan SSR, USSR
- Education: University of Bonn George C. Marshall European Center for Security Studies Russian Academy of Sciences (Ph.D.) Azerbaijan University of Languages (M.A.)
- Occupation: Political scientist
- Notable work: The Routledge Handbook of Political Risk - Exploring Future Energy Security in the Black Sea-Caspian Region, The South Caucasus at the Crossroads, EU Policy in the South Caucasus
- Website: https://mcc.hu/en/person/elkhan-nuriyev-phd https://www.humboldt-foundation.de/en/connect/explore-the-humboldt-network/singleview/1065767/prof-dr-elkhan-nuriyev https://www.lm-prisk.com/elkhan-nurijev

Elkhan Nuriyev (Azerbaijani: Elxan Eldar oğlu Nuriyev; born 15 May 1969, Baku, Azerbaijan) is an Azerbaijani political scientist and a recognized expert with a strong track record in Eurasian affairs, specializing in Russia, Eastern Europe, Caucasus, Central Asia, and Black Sea-Caspian region.

== Education ==
Nuriyev earned a MA degree with distinction in Linguistics from Azerbaijan University of Languages in 1992 and received a PhD degree in Political science from the Russian Academy of Sciences in 1996.

He also studied at the Foreign Service Academy in Pakistan in 1993, at the Goethe Institute in Bonn during 1999–2000 and at the George C. Marshall European Center for Security Studies in Garmisch-Partenkirchen in 2001. He received his postdoctoral qualification from the University of Bonn in 2010.

== Early life and career ==
He began his career in the early 1990s as a diplomat in the Ministry of Foreign Affairs of the Republic of Azerbaijan. During 1996–1997 Nuriyev was a William Fulbright Scholar at the Institute for European, Russian and Eurasian Studies at The George Washington University. Between 1999 and 2008 he also worked as a senior research associate at a number of US and European research institutions, including the Monterey Institute of International Studies, the Woodrow Wilson International Center for Scholars, the Peace Research Institute in Frankfurt and the German Institute for International and Security Affairs. Besides, he served as a co-chairman of the South Caucasus Regional Stability Study Group of the Partnership for Peace Consortium at the George C. Marshall European Center for Security Studies in Garmisch-Partenkirchen from 2002 to 2004.

In February 2008, Nuriyev was appointed as the Founding Director of the Center for Strategic Studies, Azerbaijan's premier think-tank, known by the acronym SAM in Azeri language. He headed a Baku-based SAM think-tank until late January 2011. After his resignation, Nuriyev was a Humboldt Senior Fellow at the German Council on Foreign Relations in 2011.

In 2014, Nuriyev was a DAAD Senior Fellow at the German Council on Foreign Relations in Berlin. In 2015, he was a Humboldt Senior Fellow at the German Institute for International and Security Affairs in Berlin. In 2017, Elkhan Nuriyev served as Corridors Fellow for Dialogue and Cooperation at The Leibniz Institute for East and Southeast European Studies (IOS), Regensburg, Germany. In 2019, Nuriyev worked as a Humboldt Senior Fellow at Zentrum für Osteuropa- und internationale Studien (ZOiS) / Centre for East European and International Studies in Berlin. In 2020, he was an Eastern Europe-Global Area Fellow at the Research Centre Global Dynamics, Leipzig University. In 2021, Elkhan Nuriyev worked as a Think Visegrad Senior Visiting Fellow at the Institute for Foreign Affairs and Trade (IFAT) | The Hungarian Institute of International Affairs (HIIA) in Budapest.

He is a Global Energy Associate at the Brussels Energy Club and is also a Senior Expert on Russia, Eastern Europe and Central Asia at L&M Political Risk and Strategy Advisory in Vienna.

Since November 1, 2024, Elkhan Nuriyev has been a Senior Fellow at the Mathias Corvinus Collegium Foundation (MCC) in Budapest.

Since 1993, Elkhan Nuriyev has been active as an international speaker at public and private universities, research institutions, think-tanks and international conferences in the United States, the United Kingdom, Germany, France, Russia, and elsewhere in Europe and around the world.

He has provided expert briefings, consulting, and policy advice to international organizations, government agencies, think tanks, media outlets, and multinational companies on Russia and post-Soviet countries, Iran, and Turkey, focusing on (geo)political risk analysis, market entry strategies, foreign policy, energy security, and the evaluation of key drivers of political risk in Eurasia.

Elkhan Nuriyev is the author of numerous publications on Russia, Caucasus, Central Asia and Eurasian affairs, including four books and monographs, 45 book chapters, 60 scholarly journal articles and over 600 opinion pieces in professional and popular media.

Nuriyev has been quoted in The Washington Times, Voice of America, The Moscow Times, Asia Times, Arab News, Deutsche Welle, Bloomberg Businessweek, The Frankfurter Allgemeine Zeitung, Die Furche, Cicero, BBC World Service, Radio Free Europe, ITAR-TASS, RIA Novosti, Der Standard and The Huffington Post.
