= Anar Nagilbaz =

Azerbaijani rapper, songwriter and actor (1976–2018)

- Birth name: Anar Rizvan oğlu Cəbiyev
- Also known as: The Father of Azerbaijani Rap
- Born: 28 March 1976; Baku, Azerbaijani SSR, USSR
- Died: 4 August 2018 (aged 42); Baku, Azerbaijan
- Genres: Hip hop
- Occupation(s): Rapper, songwriter, actor
- Instrument: Vocals
- Years active: 1992–2018

Anar Rizvan oglu Jabiyev (Azerbaijani: Anar Rizvan oğlu Cəbiyev, Анар Ризван оғлу Ҹәбијев [ɑˈnɑr rizˈvɑn ɔˈɣlu d͡ʒæˈbijɪf], 28 March 1976 Baku – 4 August 2018 Baku), known as Anar Nagilbaz (Azerbaijani: Anar Nağılbaz, Анар Нағылбаз, [nɑɣəlˈbɑs]), was an Azerbaijani rapper, songwriter and actor. He is often considered the "Father of Azerbaijani Rap" after he composed the first rap album in Azerbaijani.

== Albums ==
- Sabah Olmayacaq (1997)
- Keçdi Günlər (1999)
- O Qızı Görən Olubmu? (2000)
- Zaman O Zaman Deyil (2001)
- Dost (2003)
- İç Xəbər (2005)
- Göbələk (2005)
- Non-Stop (2007)
