= List of diplomatic missions of Norway =

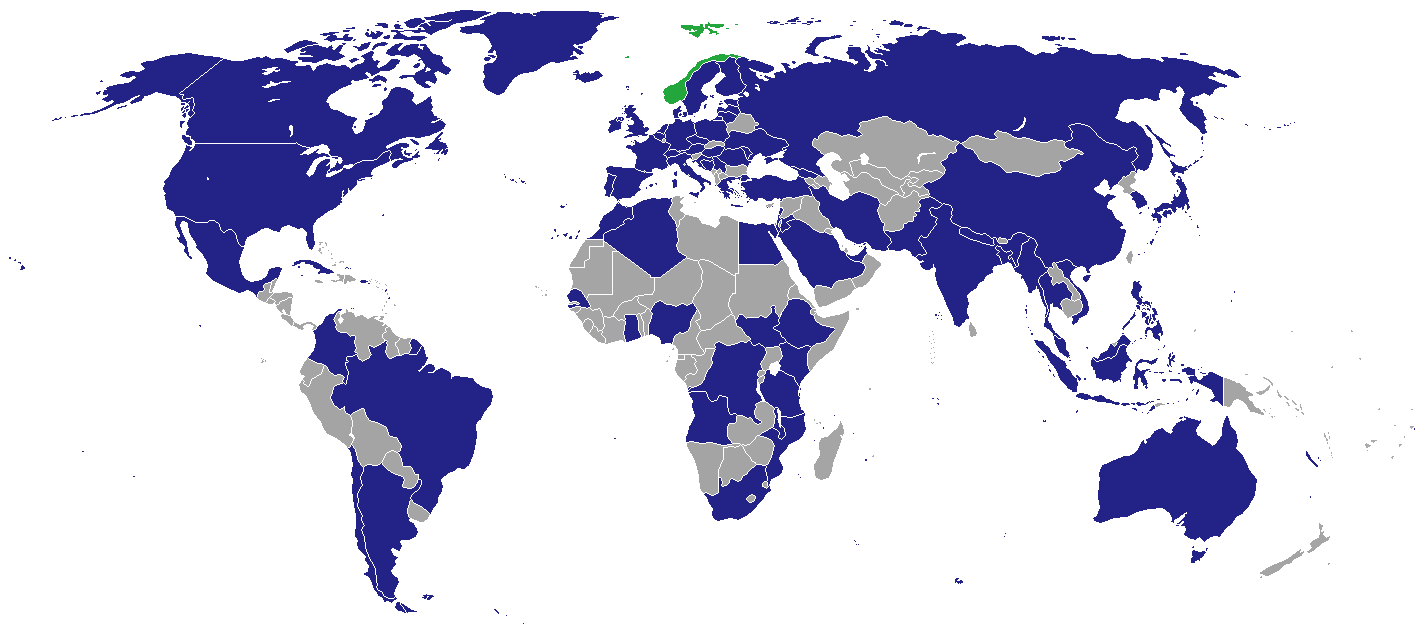
Norwegian diplomatic missions

This is a list of diplomatic missions of Norway, excluding honorary consulates.

In countries without Norwegian representation, Norwegian citizens can seek assistance from public officials in the foreign services of any of the other Nordic countries, in accordance with the Helsinki Treaty.

== Current missions ==
=== Africa ===
Host country	Host city	Mission	Concurrent accreditation	Ref.
Algeria	Algiers	Embassy	Countries: Tunisia	
Angola	Luanda	Embassy	Countries: São Tomé and Príncipe	
Congo-Kinshasa	Kinshasa	Embassy	Countries: Central African Republic; Congo-Brazzaville; Equatorial Guinea; Gabon	
Egypt	Cairo	Embassy	Countries: Libya	
Ethiopia	Addis Ababa	Embassy	Countries: Djibouti	
Ghana	Accra	Embassy	Countries: Gambia; Guinea; Ivory Coast; Liberia; Sierra Leone	
Kenya	Nairobi	Embassy	Countries: Seychelles; Somalia; International Organizations: United Nations; United Nations Environment Programme; United Nations Human Settlements Programme	
Malawi	Lilongwe	Embassy	Countries: Zambia	
Morocco	Rabat	Embassy		
Mozambique	Maputo	Embassy	Countries: Eswatini; Mauritius	
Nigeria	Abuja	Embassy	Countries: Benin; Cameroon; Togo	
Senegal	Dakar	Embassy	Countries: Burkina Faso; Chad; Mali; Niger; Mauritania	
South Africa	Pretoria	Embassy	Countries: Botswana; Lesotho; Madagascar; Namibia; Zimbabwe	
South Sudan	Juba	Embassy		
Tanzania	Dar Es Salaam	Embassy	Countries: Burundi; Comoros; Rwanda; Uganda	

=== Americas ===
Host country	Host city	Mission	Concurrent accreditation	Ref.
Argentina	Buenos Aires	Embassy	Countries: Bolivia; Paraguay; Uruguay	
Brazil	Brasília	Embassy	Countries: Guyana; Suriname	
Brazil	Rio de Janeiro	Consulate-General	Countries: Guyana; Suriname	
Canada	Ottawa	Embassy		
Chile	Santiago	Embassy	Countries: Peru	
Colombia	Bogotá	Embassy	Countries: Ecuador; Panama; Venezuela	
Cuba	Havana	Embassy	Countries: Antigua and Barbuda; Bahamas; Barbados; Dominica; Dominican Republic; Grenada; Haiti; Jamaica; Saint Kitts and Nevis; Saint Lucia; Saint Vincent and the Grenadines; Trinidad and Tobago	
Mexico	Mexico City	Embassy	Countries: Belize; Costa Rica; El Salvador; Guatemala; Honduras; Nicaragua	
United States	Washington, D.C.	Embassy	International Organizations: Organization of American States (Note: Accredited as an observer mission.)	
United States	New York City	Consulate-General	International Organizations: Organization of American States	
United States	San Francisco	Consulate-General	International Organizations: Organization of American States	

=== Asia ===
Host country	Host city	Mission	Concurrent accreditation	Ref.
Bangladesh	Dhaka	Embassy		
China	Beijing	Embassy	Countries: Mongolia	
China	Shanghai	Consulate-General	Countries: Mongolia	
Georgia	Tbilisi	Embassy	Countries: Armenia	
India	New Delhi	Embassy	Countries: Bhutan; Maldives; Sri Lanka	
India	Mumbai	Consulate-General	Countries: Bhutan; Maldives; Sri Lanka	
Indonesia	Jakarta	Embassy	Countries: East Timor; International Organizations: Association of Southeast Asian Nations	
Iran	Tehran	Embassy		
Israel	Tel Aviv	Embassy		
Japan	Tokyo	Embassy	Countries: Marshall Islands; Micronesia	
Jordan	Amman	Embassy	Countries: Iraq	
Lebanon	Beirut	Embassy	Countries: Syria	
Malaysia	Kuala Lumpur	Embassy	Countries: Brunei	
Myanmar	Yangon	Embassy		
Nepal	Kathmandu	Embassy		
Pakistan	Islamabad	Embassy		
Palestine	Ramallah	Representative office		
Philippines	Manila	Embassy	Countries: Palau	
Saudi Arabia	Riyadh	Embassy	Countries: Bahrain; Oman; Yemen	
Singapore	Singapore	Embassy		
South Korea	Seoul	Embassy	Countries: North Korea	
Thailand	Bangkok	Embassy	Countries: Cambodia	
Turkey	Ankara	Embassy	Countries: Albania; Azerbaijan; Kosovo	
United Arab Emirates	Abu Dhabi	Embassy	Countries: Kuwait; Qatar	
United Arab Emirates	Dubai	Consulate-General	Countries: Kuwait; Qatar	
Vietnam	Hanoi	Embassy	Countries: Laos	

=== Europe ===
Host country	Host city	Mission	Concurrent accreditation	Ref.
Austria	Vienna	Embassy	International Organizations: United Nations; International Atomic Energy Agency; UNIDO; UNODC; UNCITRAL	
Belgium	Brussels	Embassy		
Bosnia and Herzegovina	Sarajevo	Embassy		
Croatia	Zagreb	Embassy		
Czech Republic	Prague	Embassy		
Denmark	Copenhagen	Embassy		
Estonia	Tallinn	Embassy		
Finland	Helsinki	Embassy		
France	Paris	Embassy	Countries: Monaco	
Germany	Berlin	Embassy		
Greece	Athens	Embassy	Countries: Cyprus	
Hungary	Budapest	Embassy	Countries: Slovenia	
Iceland	Reykjavík	Embassy		
Ireland	Dublin	Embassy		
Italy	Rome	Embassy	Countries: Malta; San Marino	
Latvia	Riga	Embassy		
Lithuania	Vilnius	Embassy	Countries: Belarus	
Moldova	Chișinău	Embassy		
Netherlands	The Hague	Embassy	Countries: Luxembourg; International Organizations: OPCW	
Poland	Warsaw	Embassy		
Portugal	Lisbon	Embassy	Countries: Cape Verde; Guinea-Bissau	
Romania	Bucharest	Embassy	Countries: Bulgaria; Moldova	
Russia	Moscow	Embassy		
Russia	Saint Petersburg	Consulate-General		
Serbia	Belgrade	Embassy	Countries: Montenegro; North Macedonia	
Spain	Madrid	Embassy	Countries: Andorra	
Sweden	Stockholm	Embassy		
Switzerland	Bern	Embassy	Countries: Holy See; Liechtenstein	
Ukraine	Kyiv	Embassy		
United Kingdom	London	Embassy		

=== Oceania ===
Host country	Host city	Mission	Concurrent accreditation	Ref.
Australia	Canberra	Embassy	Countries: Cook Islands; Fiji; Kiribati; Nauru; New Zealand; Papua New Guinea; Samoa; Solomon Islands; Tonga; Tuvalu; Vanuatu	

=== Multilateral organizations ===
Organization	Host city	Host country	Mission	Concurrent accreditation	Ref.
African Union	Addis Ababa	Ethiopia	Permanent Delegation		
Council of Europe	Strasbourg	France	Permanent Delegation		
European Union	Brussels	Belgium	Permanent Mission		
Food and Agriculture Organization	Rome	Italy	Permanent Mission	International Organizations: International Fund for Agricultural Development; World Food Programme	
NATO	Brussels	Belgium	Permanent Delegation		
OECD	Paris	France	Permanent Delegation	International Organizations: UNESCO	
OSCE	Vienna	Austria	Permanent Delegation		
United Nations	New York City	United States	Permanent Mission		
United Nations	Geneva	Switzerland	Permanent Mission	International Organizations: European Free Trade Association; World Health Organization; World Trade Organization	

== Gallery ==
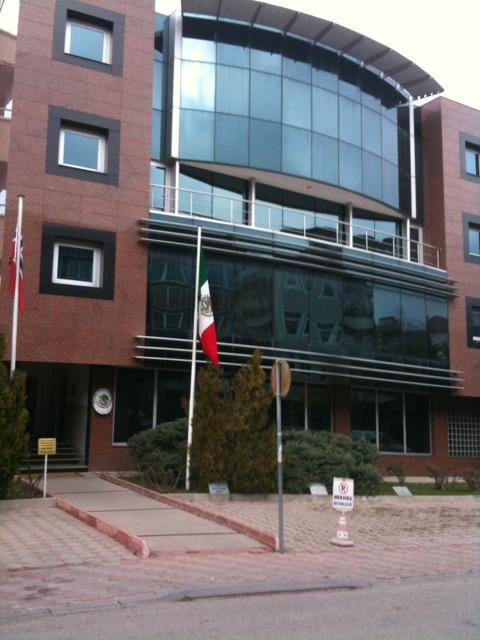
Embassy in Ankara

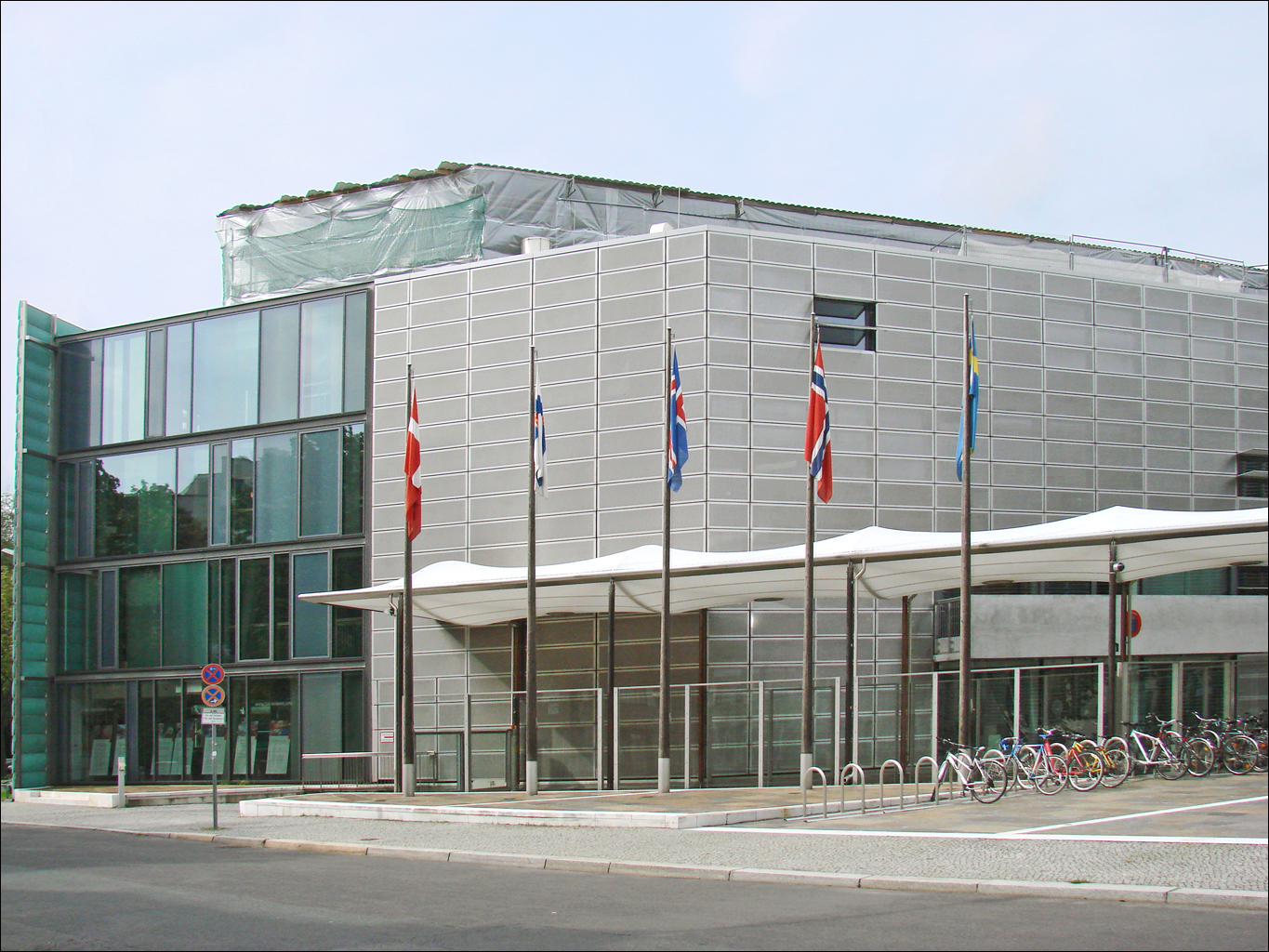
Embassy in Berlin

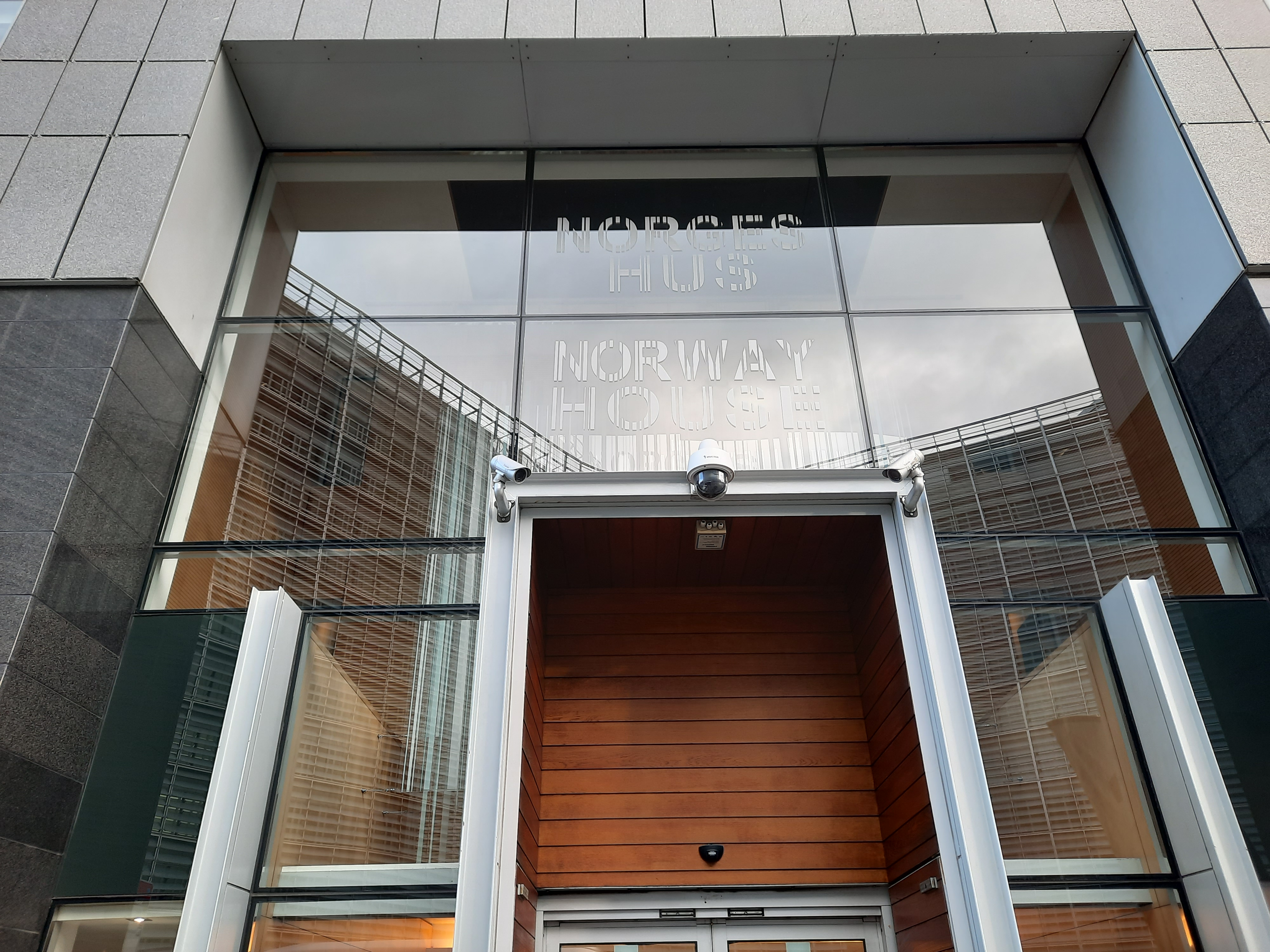
Embassy in Brussels

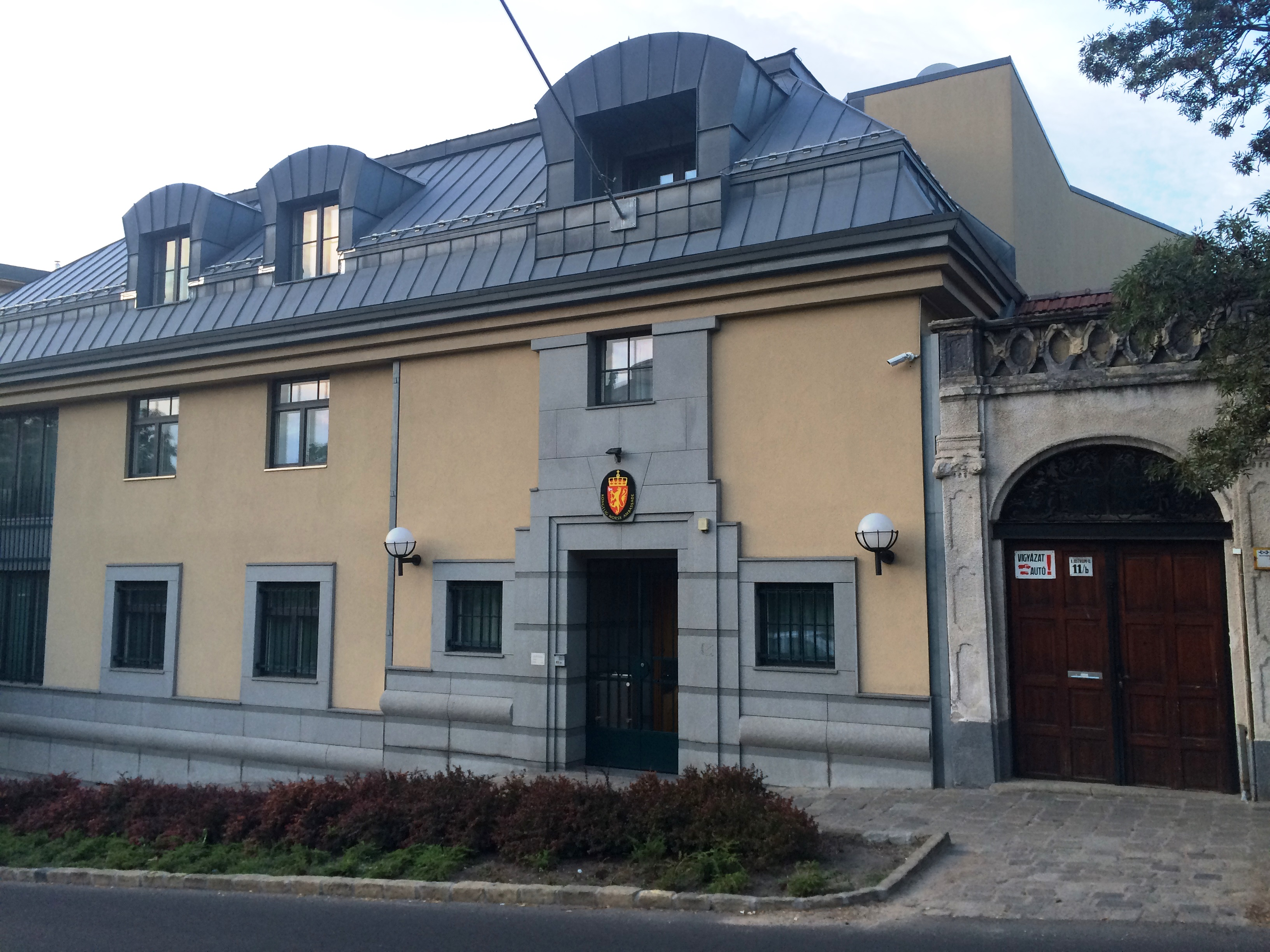
Embassy in Budapest

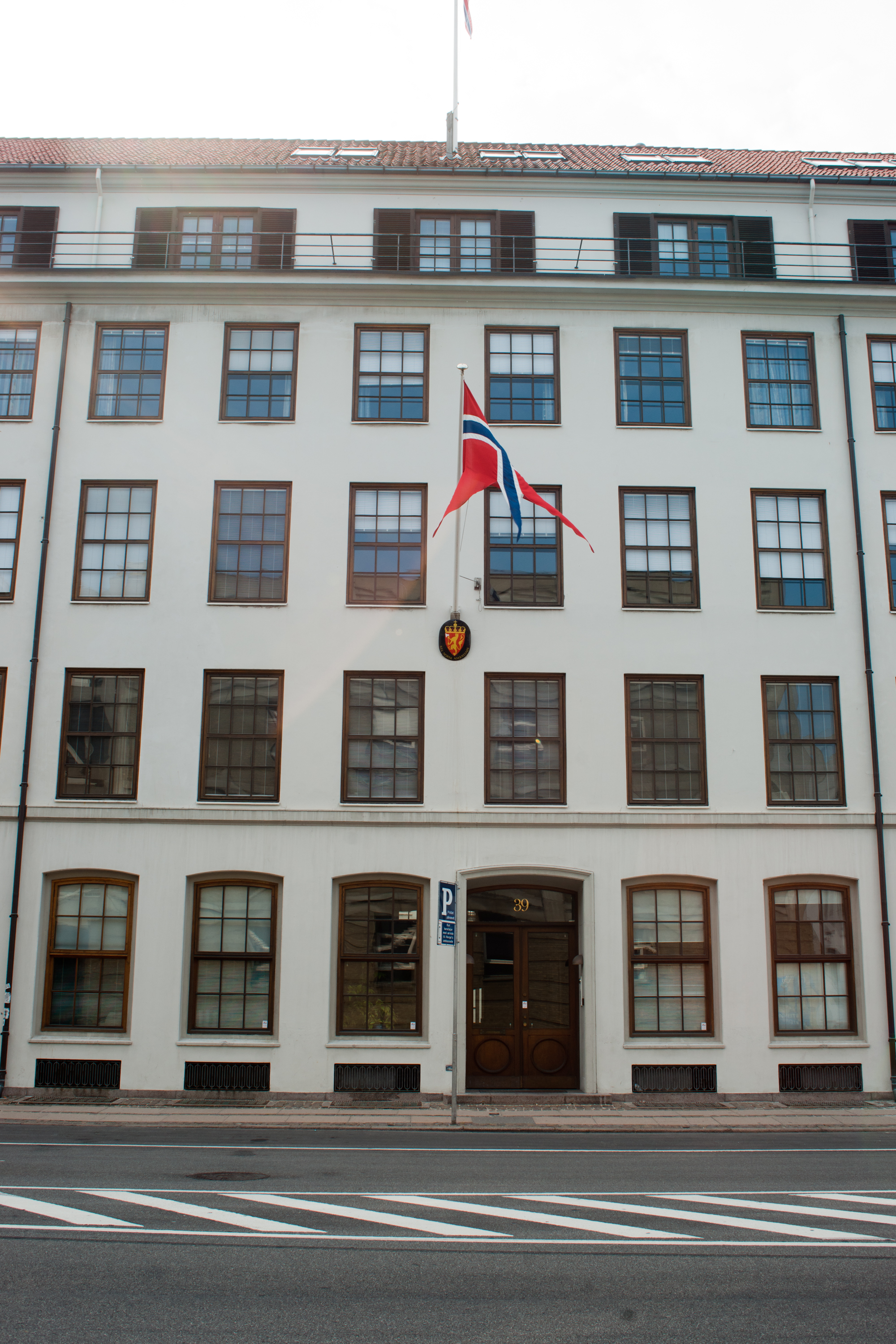
Embassy in Copenhagen

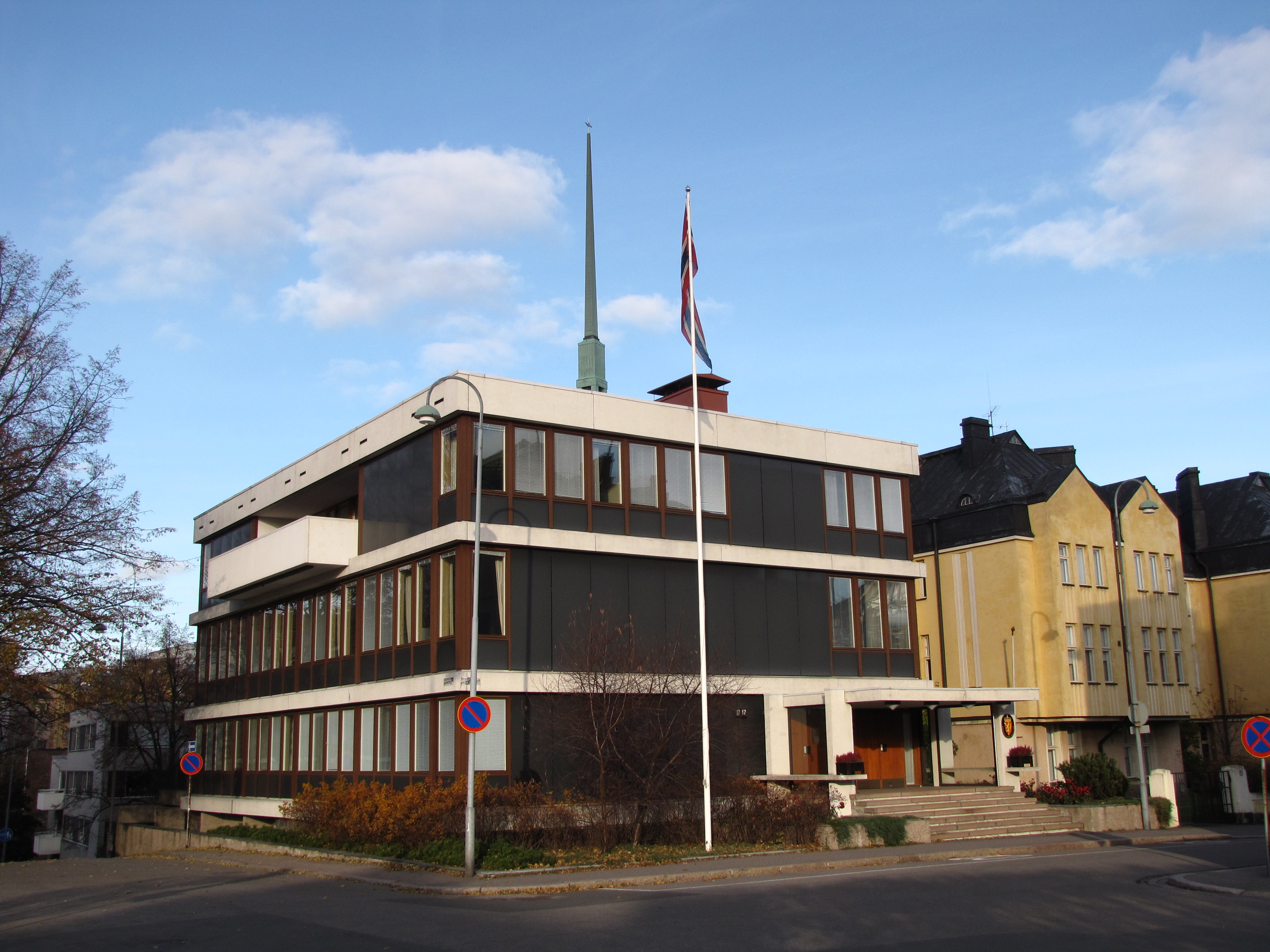
Embassy in Helsinki

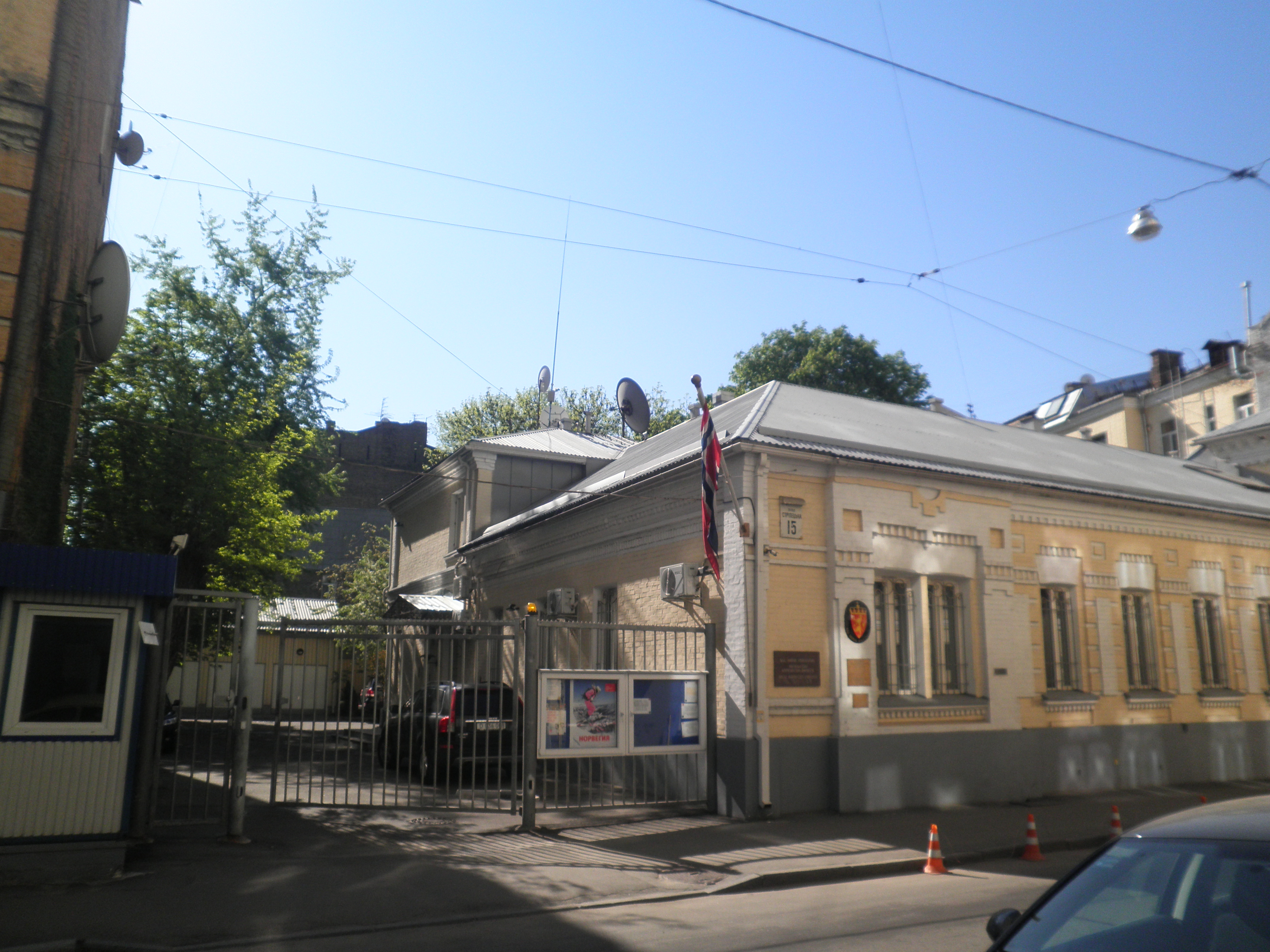
Embassy in Kyiv

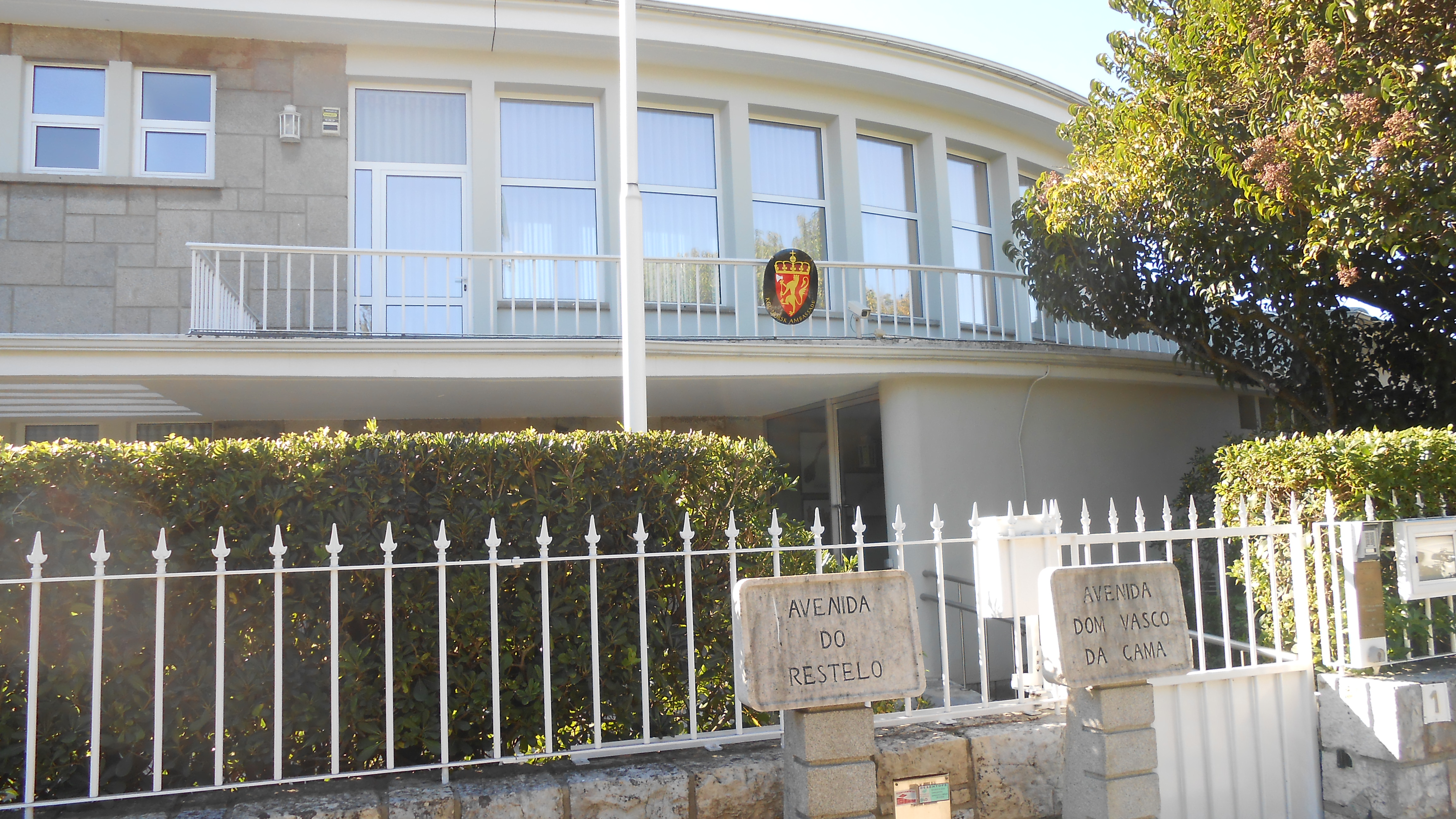
Embassy in Lisbon

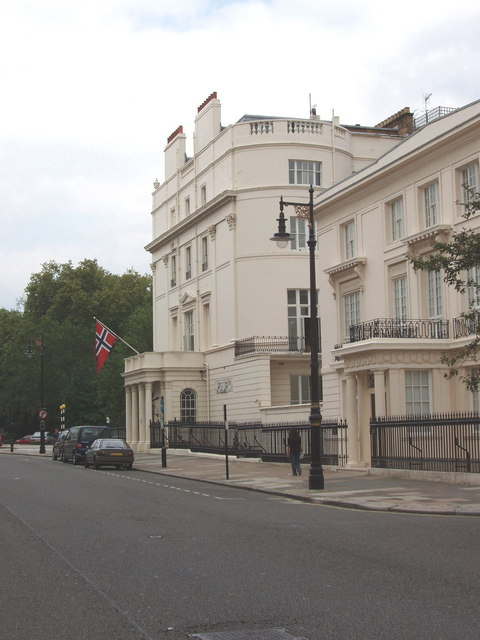
Embassy in London

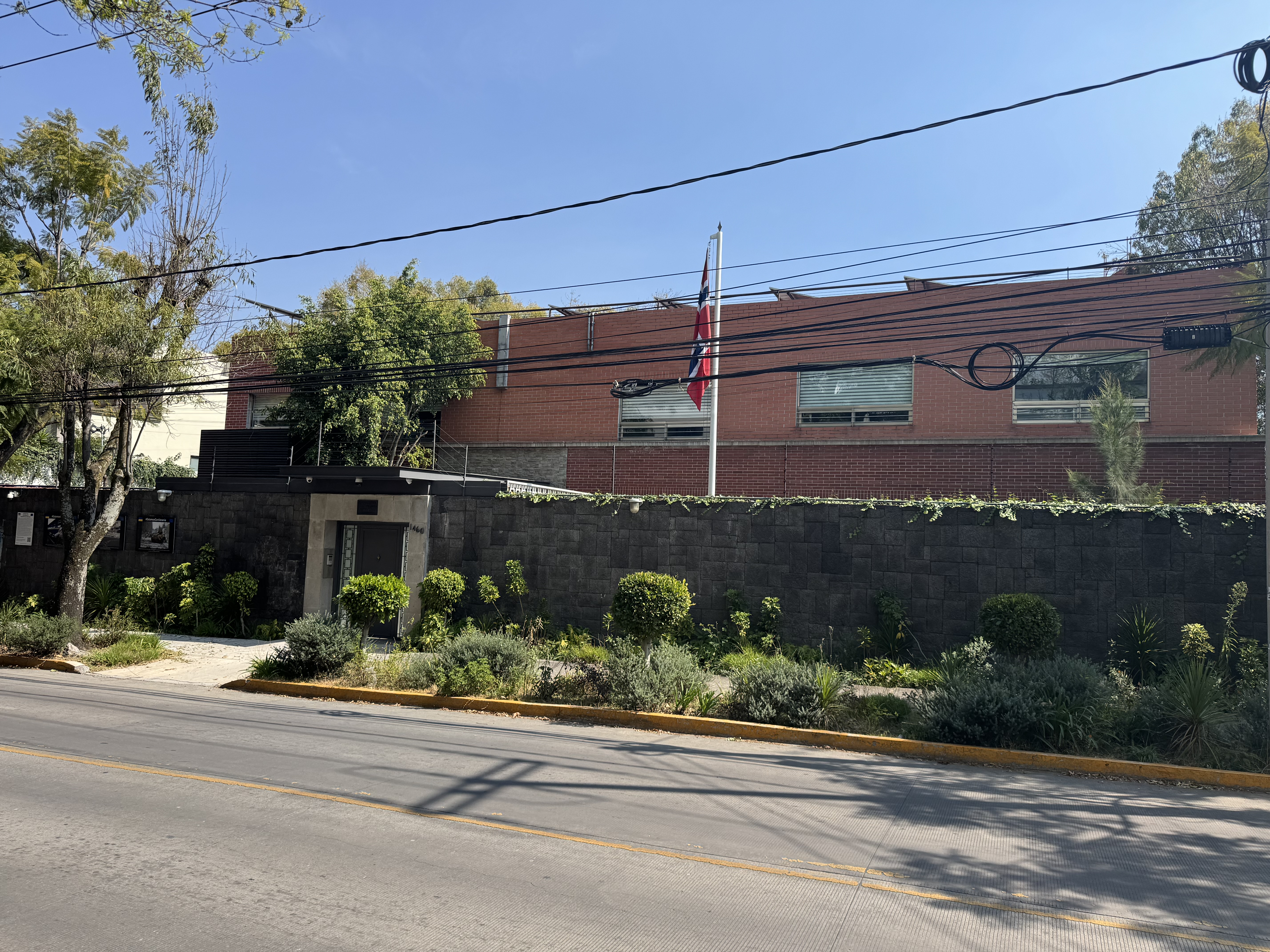
Embassy in Mexico City

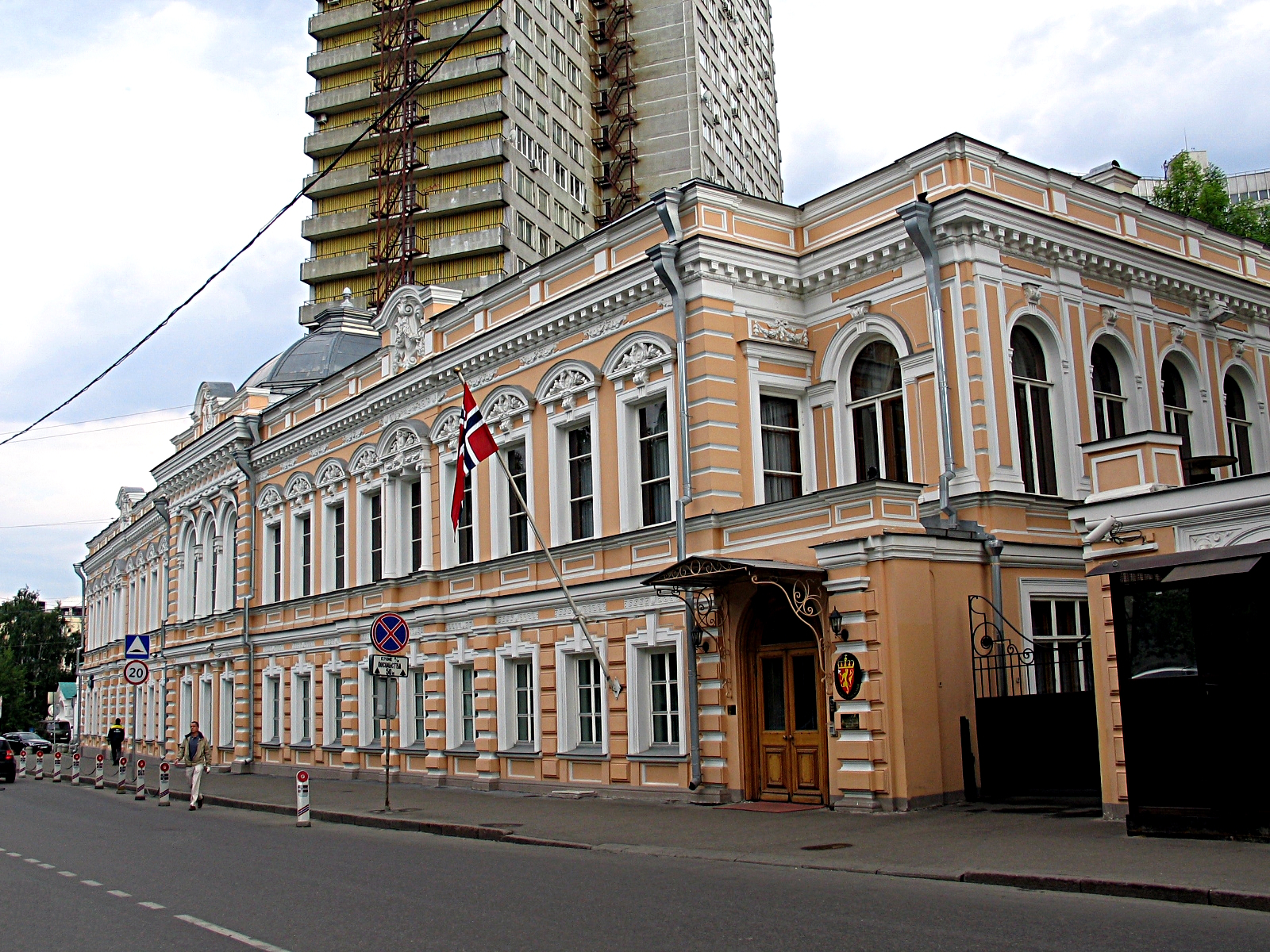
Embassy in Moscow

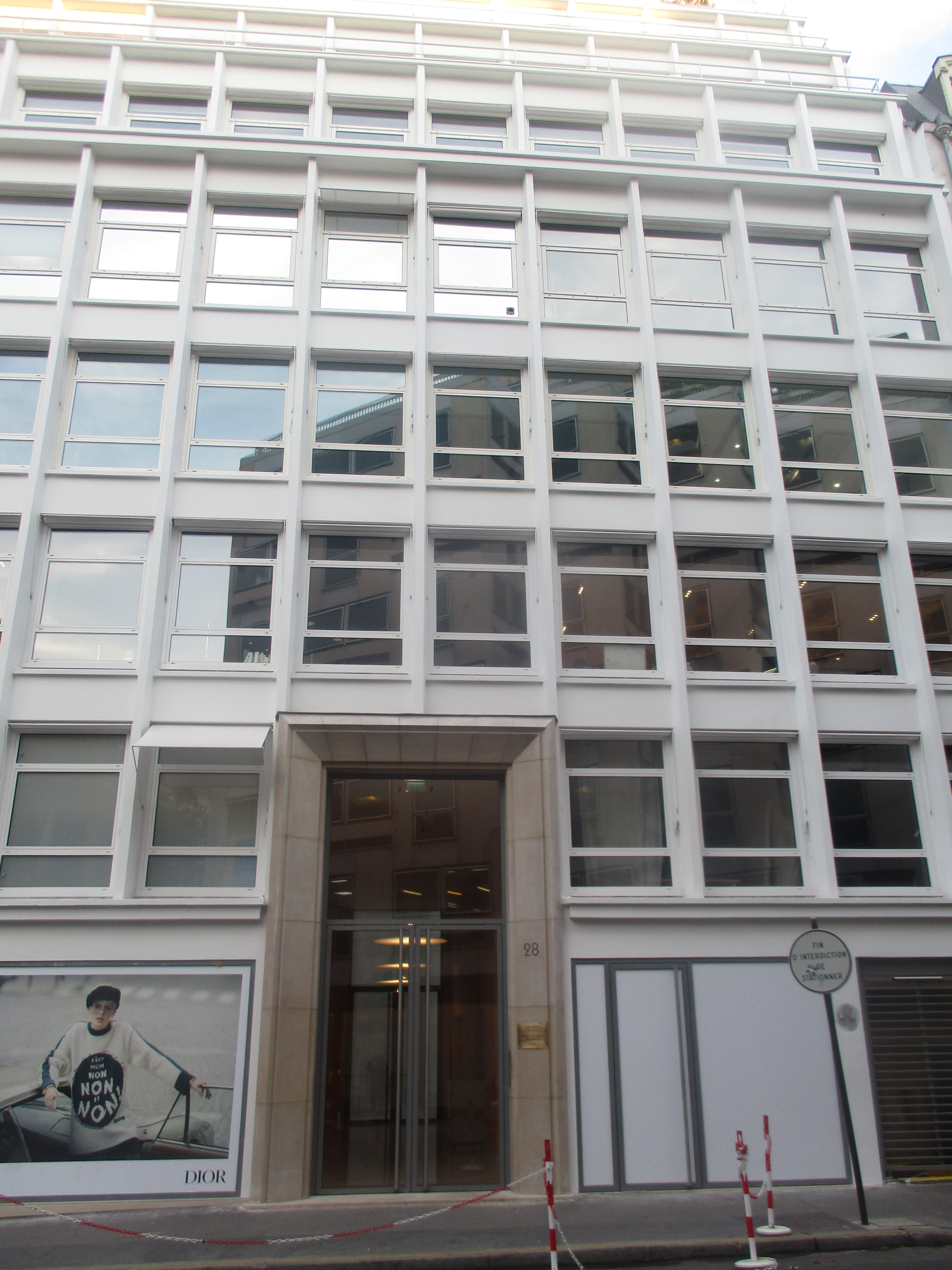
Building hosting the embassy in Paris

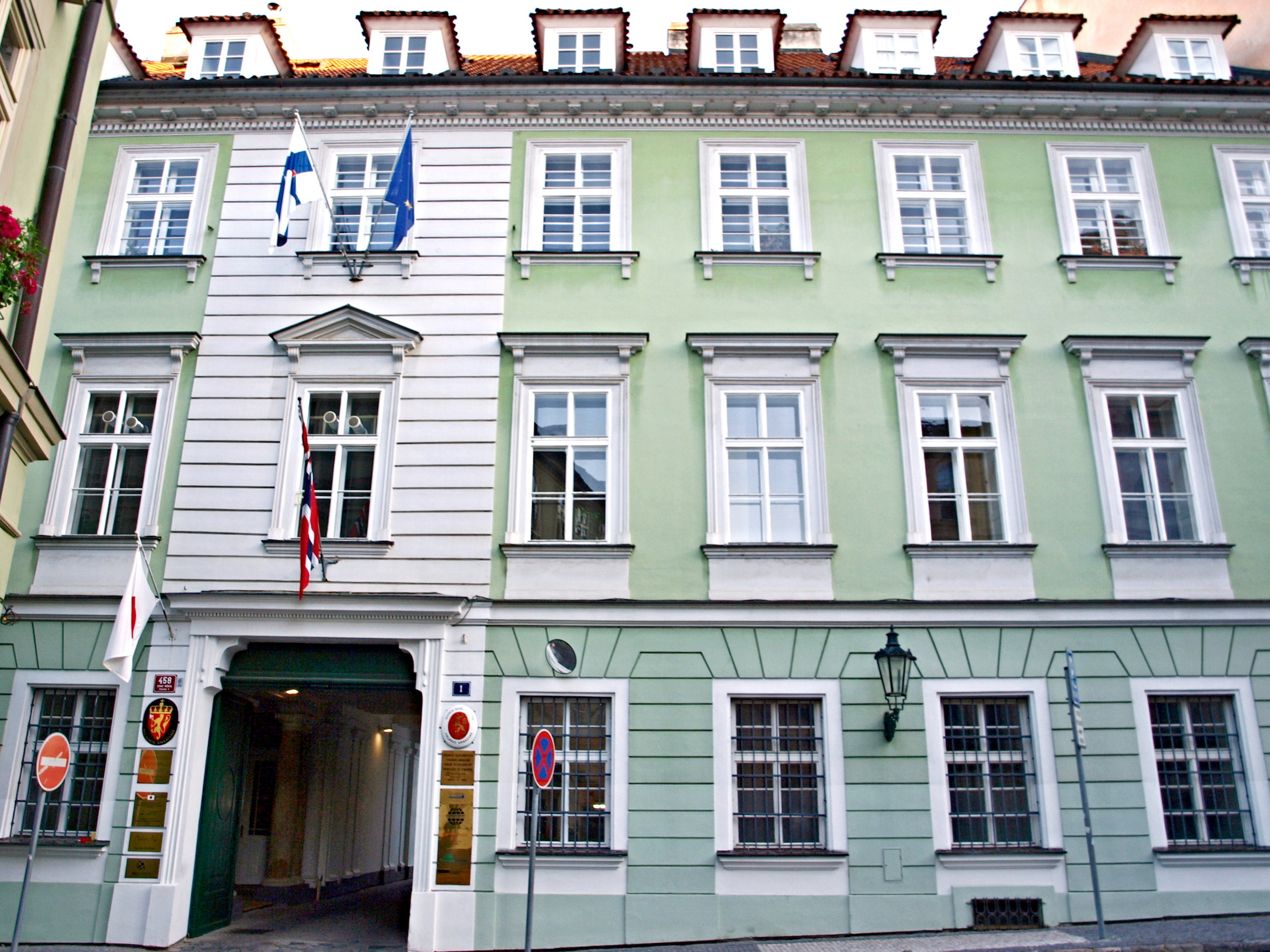
Embassy in Prague

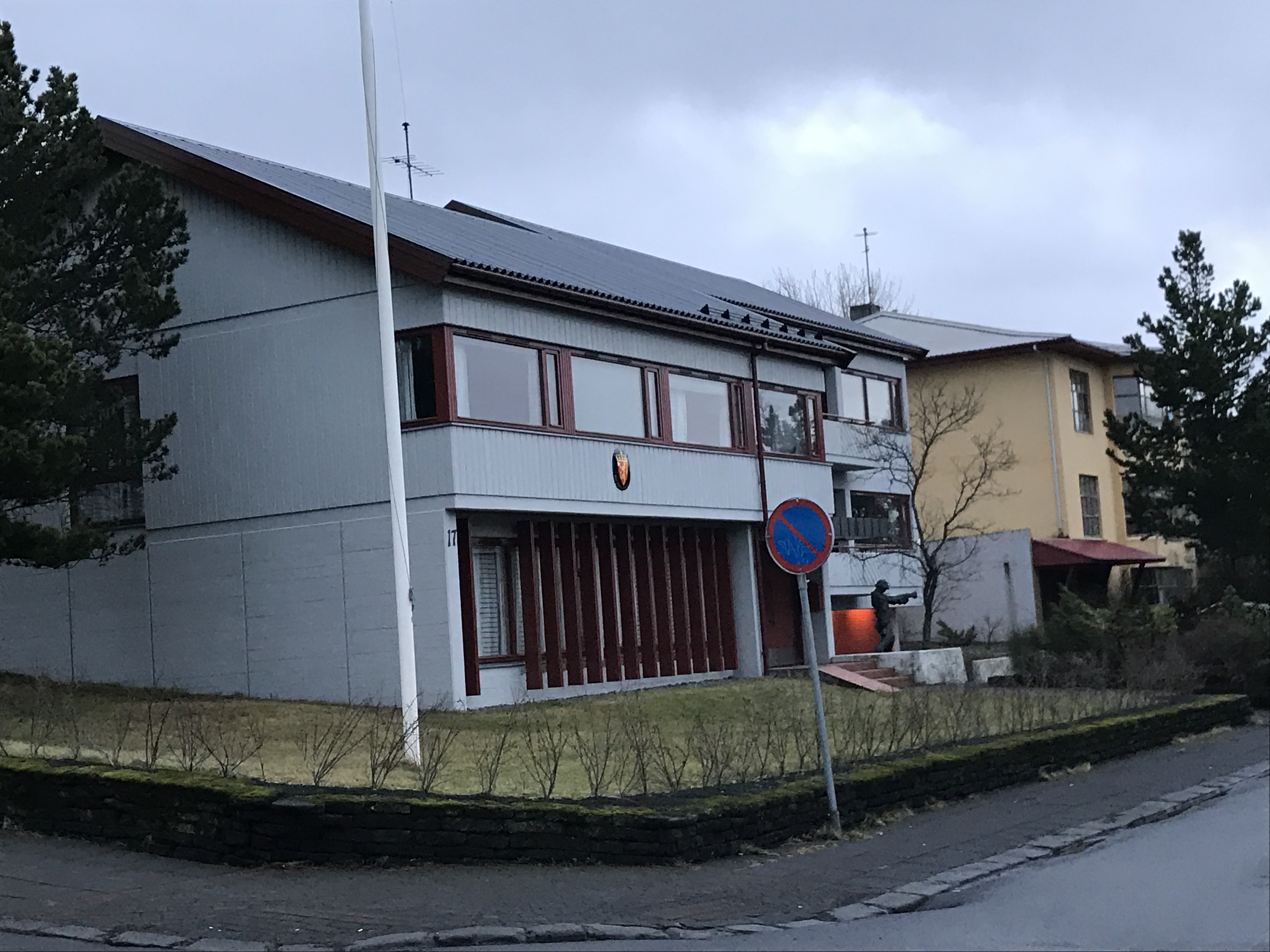
Embassy in Reykjavík

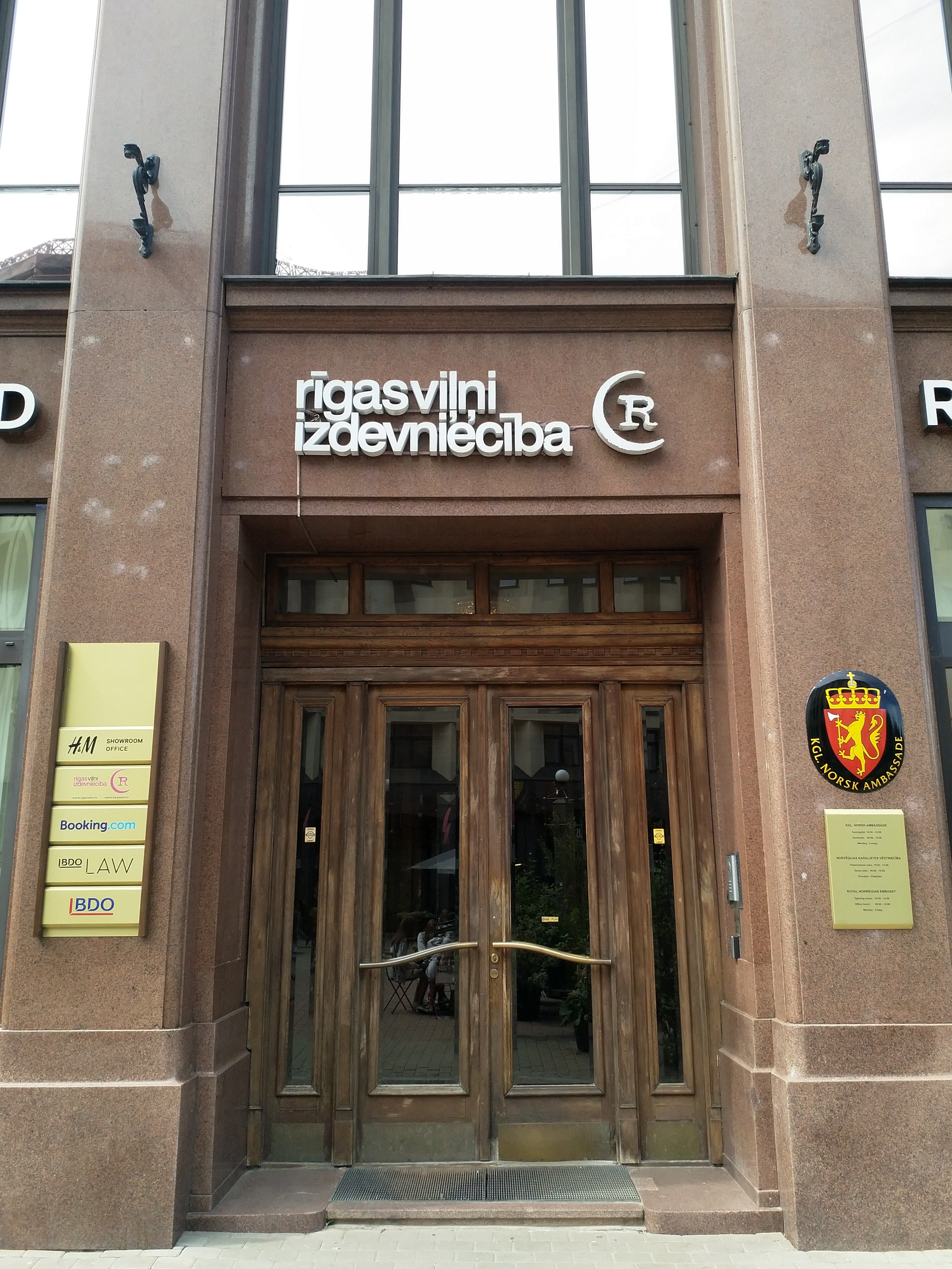
Embassy in Riga

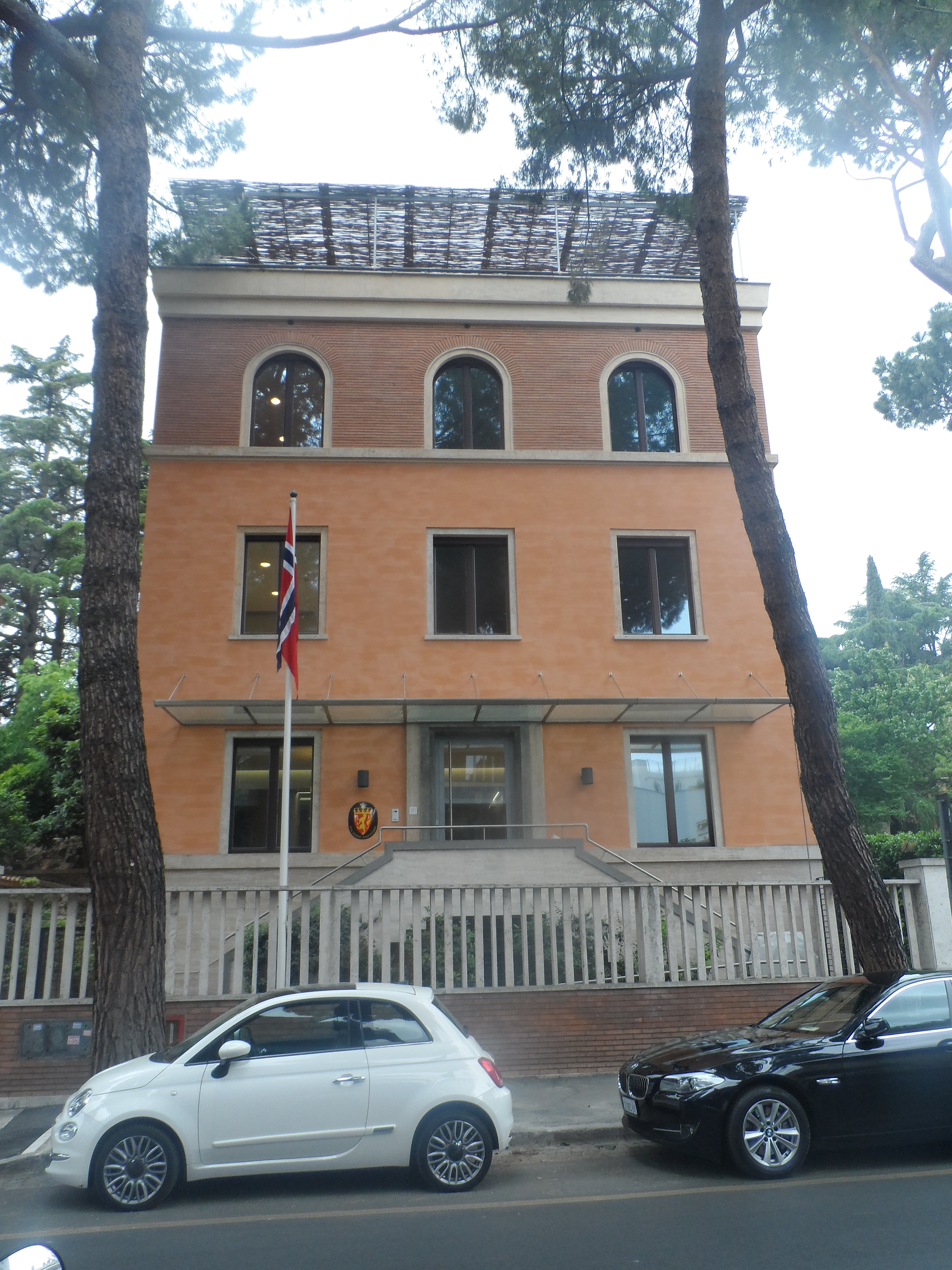
Embassy in Rome

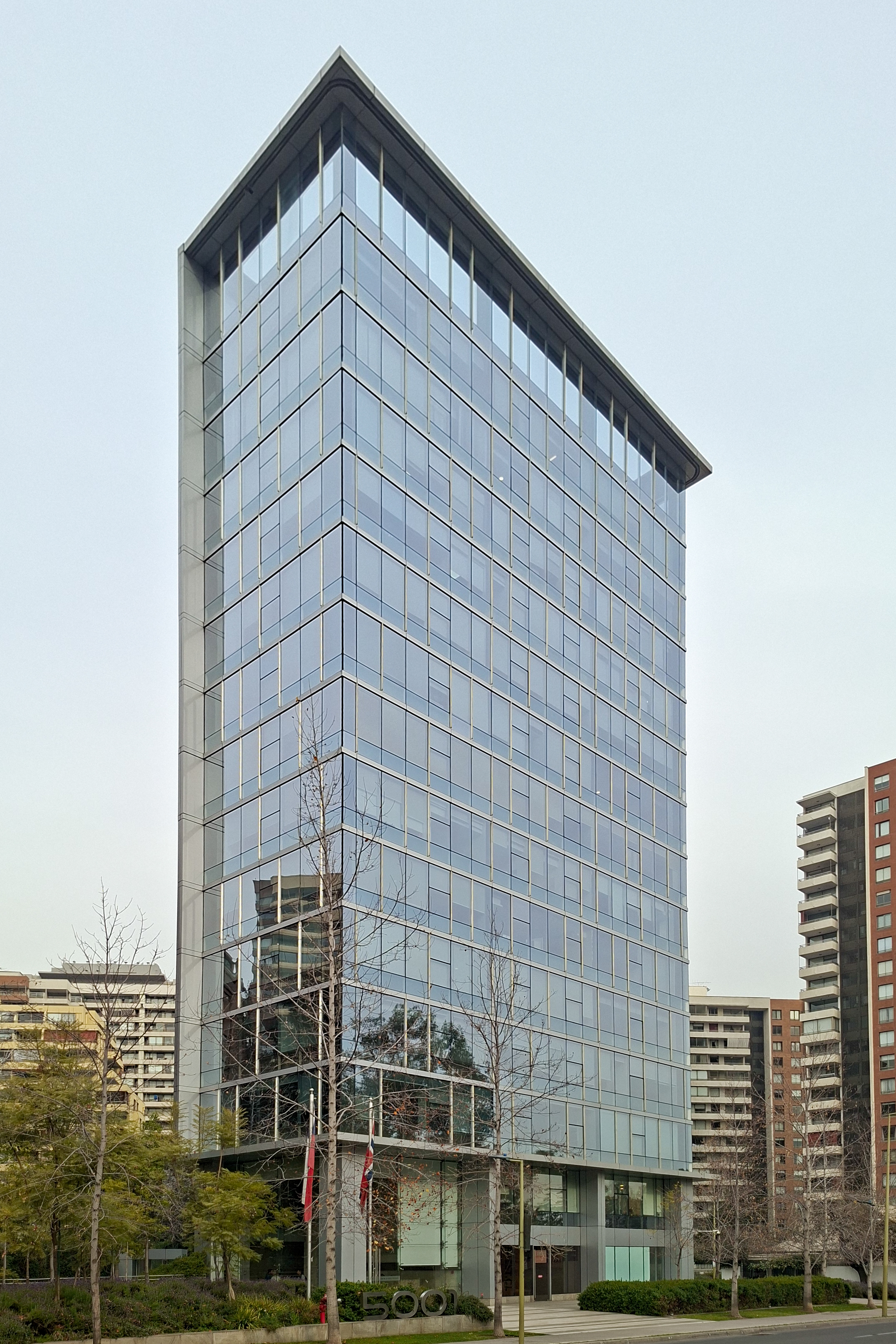
Building hosting the Embassy in Santiago

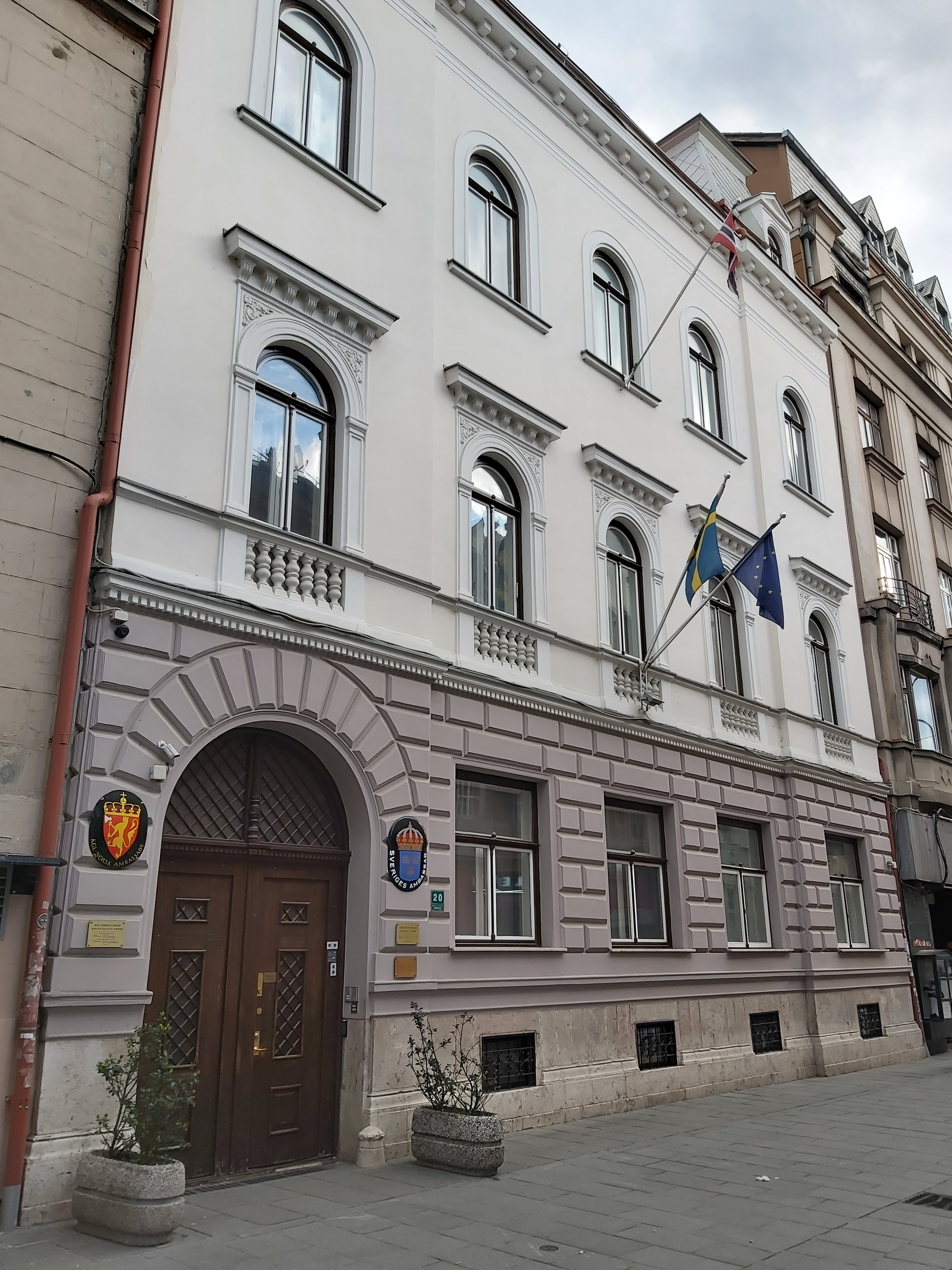
Embassy in Sarajevo

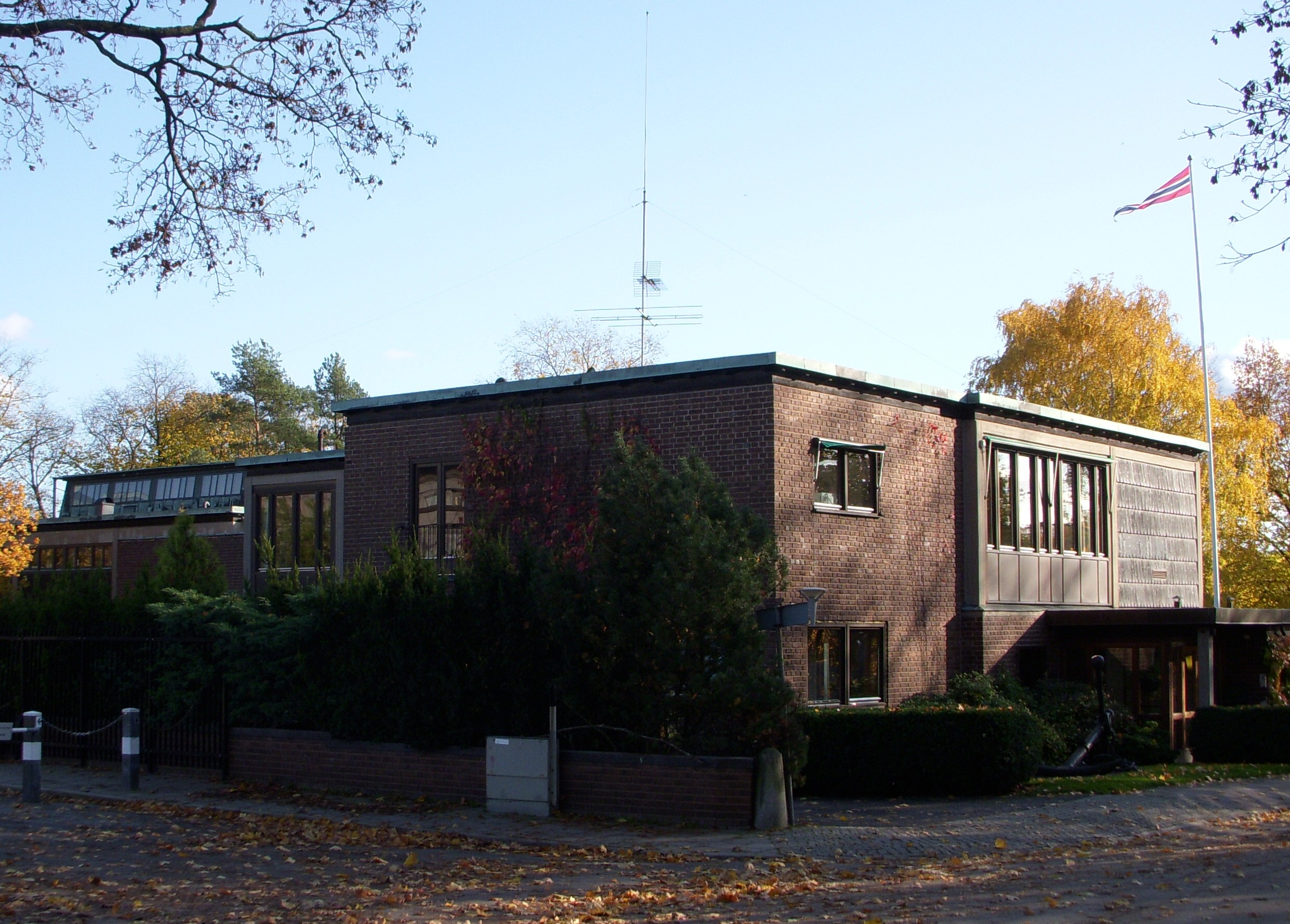
Embassy in Stockholm

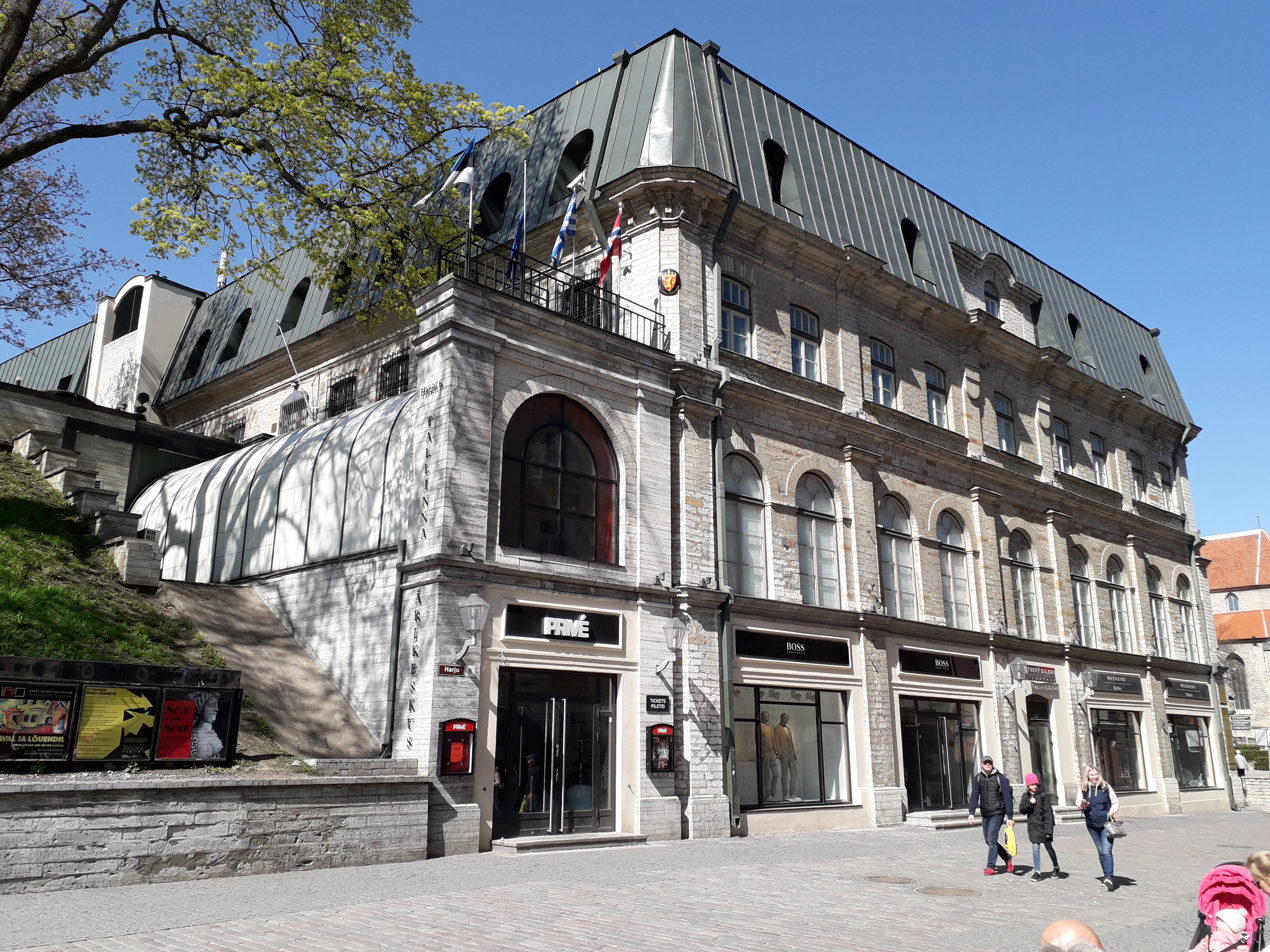
Embassy in Tallinn

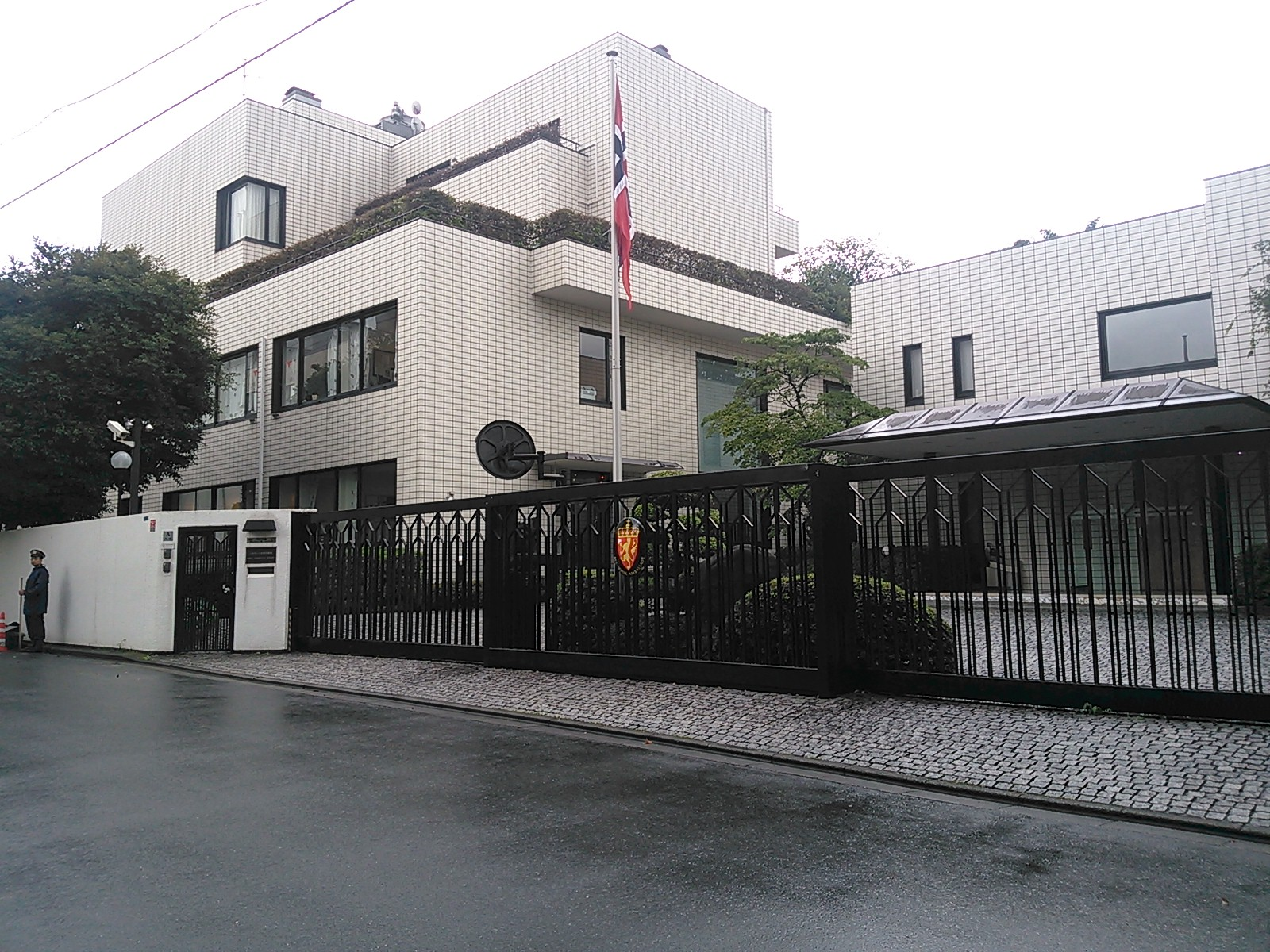
Embassy in Tokyo

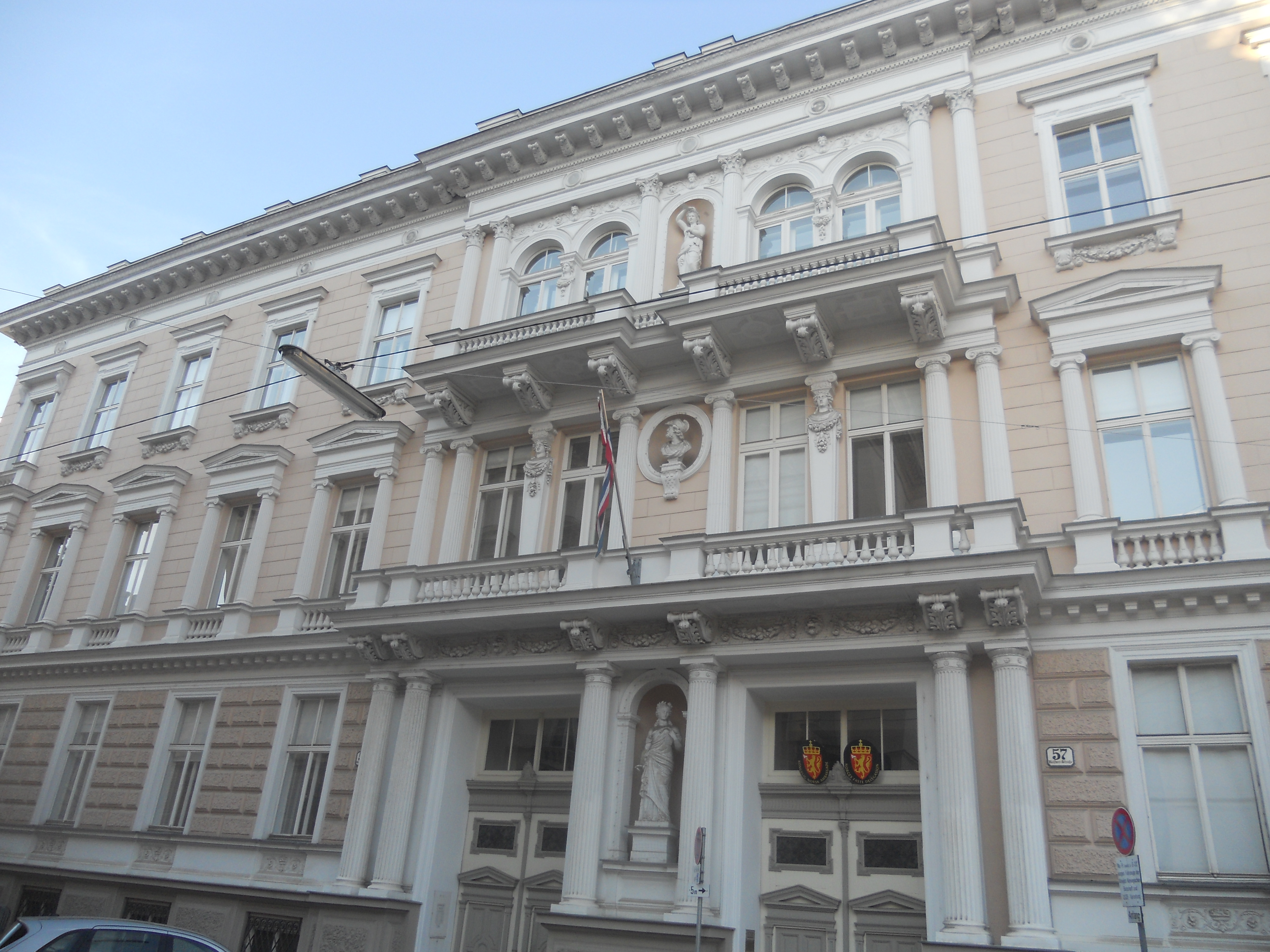
Embassy in Vienna

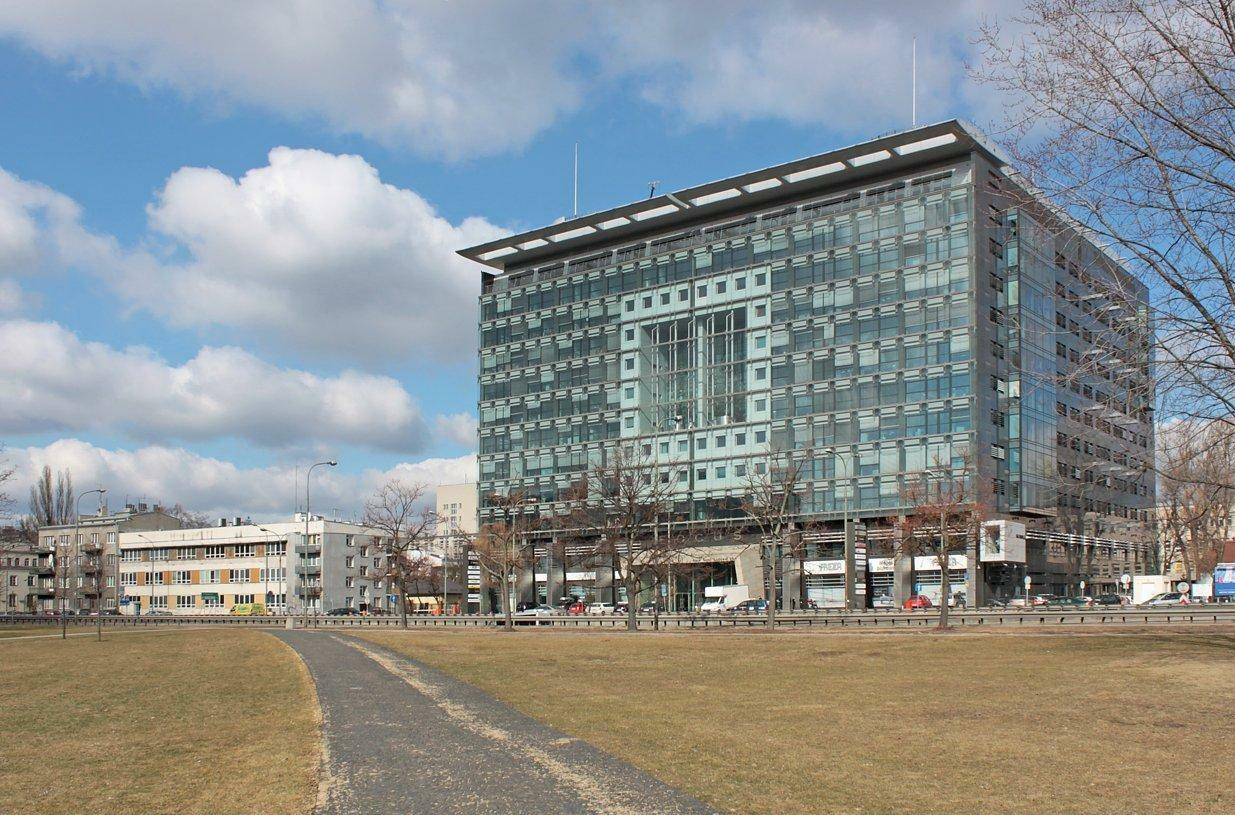
Building hosting the embassy in Warsaw

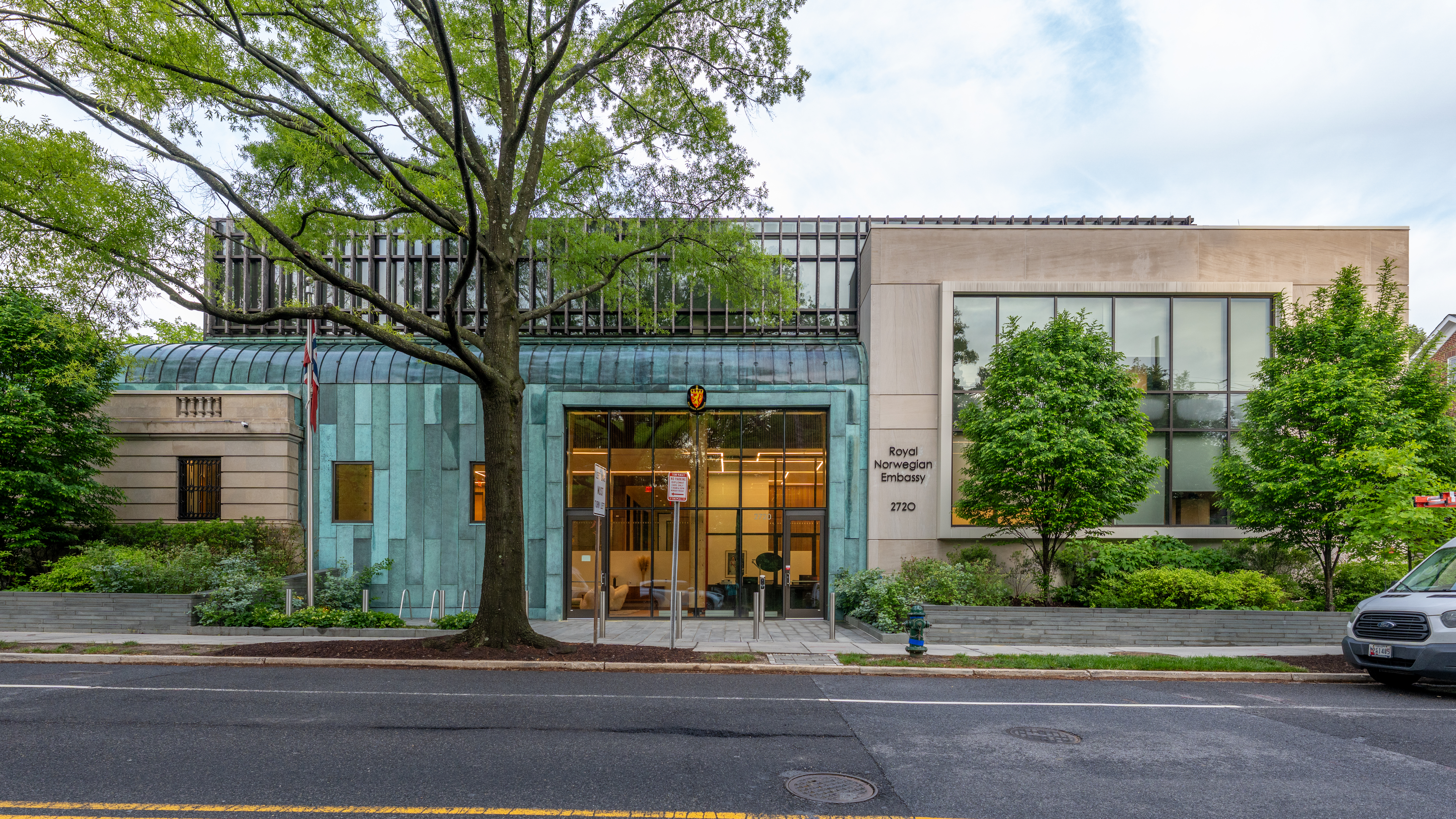
Embassy in Washington, D.C.

== Closed missions ==
=== Africa ===
Host country	Host city	Mission	Year closed	Ref.
Botswana	Gaborone	Embassy (Note: Resident in Pretoria, Gauteng, South Africa)	1997	
Eritrea	Asmara	Embassy	2013	
Ivory Coast	Abidjan	Embassy (Note: Resident in Accra, Cuba)	2011	
Libya	Tripoli	Embassy (Note: Resident in Cairo, Egypt)	Unknown	
Madagascar	Antananarivo	Embassy Office	2023	
Mali	Bamako	Embassy (Note: Resident in Dakar, Senegal)	2024	
Namibia	Windhoek	Embassy	Unknown	
Uganda	Kampala	Embassy (Note: Resident in Dar es Salaam, Tanzania)	2024	
Zambia	Lusaka	Embassy (Note: Resident in Lilongwe, Southern Malawi, Malawi)	2016	
Zimbabwe	Harare	Embassy	2016	

=== Americas ===
Host country	Host city	Mission	Year closed	Ref.
Canada	Vancouver	Consulate-General	Unknown	
Guatemala	Guatemala City	Embassy (Note: Resident in Mexico City, Mexico)	2016	
Nicaragua	Managua	Embassy	2011	
United States	Miami	Consulate-General	2003	
United States	Minneapolis	Consulate-General	2008	
United States	Houston	Consulate-General	2023	
Venezuela	Caracas	Embassy (Note: Resident in Bogotá, Colombia)	2013	

=== Asia ===
Host country	Host city	Mission	Year closed	Ref.
Afghanistan	Kabul	Embassy	2021	
Azerbaijan	Baku	Embassy (Note: Resident in Ankara, Türkiye)	2019	
China	Hong Kong	Consulate-General	2003	
China	Guangzhou	Consulate-General	2024	
Iraq	Baghdad	Embassy (Note: Resident in Amman, Jordan)	Unknown	
Kazakhstan	Astana	Embassy (Note: Resident in Moscow, Russia)	2016	
Syria	Damascus	Embassy	2012	
Sri Lanka	Colombo	Embassy (Note: Resident in New Delhi, India)	2023	

=== Europe ===
Host country	Host city	Mission	Year closed	Ref.
Bulgaria	Sofia	Embassy (Note: Resident in Bucharest, Romania)	2016	
Germany	Hamburg	Consulate-General	2012	
Kosovo	Pristina	Embassy	2023	
Republic of Macedonia (Note: The embassy closed down prior to the renaming of the Republic of Macedonia to the Republic of North Macedonia in 2019.)	Skopje	Embassy (Note: Resident in Belgrade, Serbia)	2012	
Russia	Murmansk	Consulate-General	2022	
Slovakia	Bratislava	Embassy (Note: Resident in Vienna, Austria)	2023	
Slovenia	Ljubljana	Embassy (Note: Resident in Budapest, Hungary)	2011	
Spain	Alicante	Consulate-General	2012	
United Kingdom	Edinburgh	Consulate-General	2008	

== See also ==
- Foreign relations of Norway
- Norwegian Ministry of Foreign Affairs
- List of diplomatic missions of the Nordic countries
