= Elkhan Zeynalli =

Qaraqan
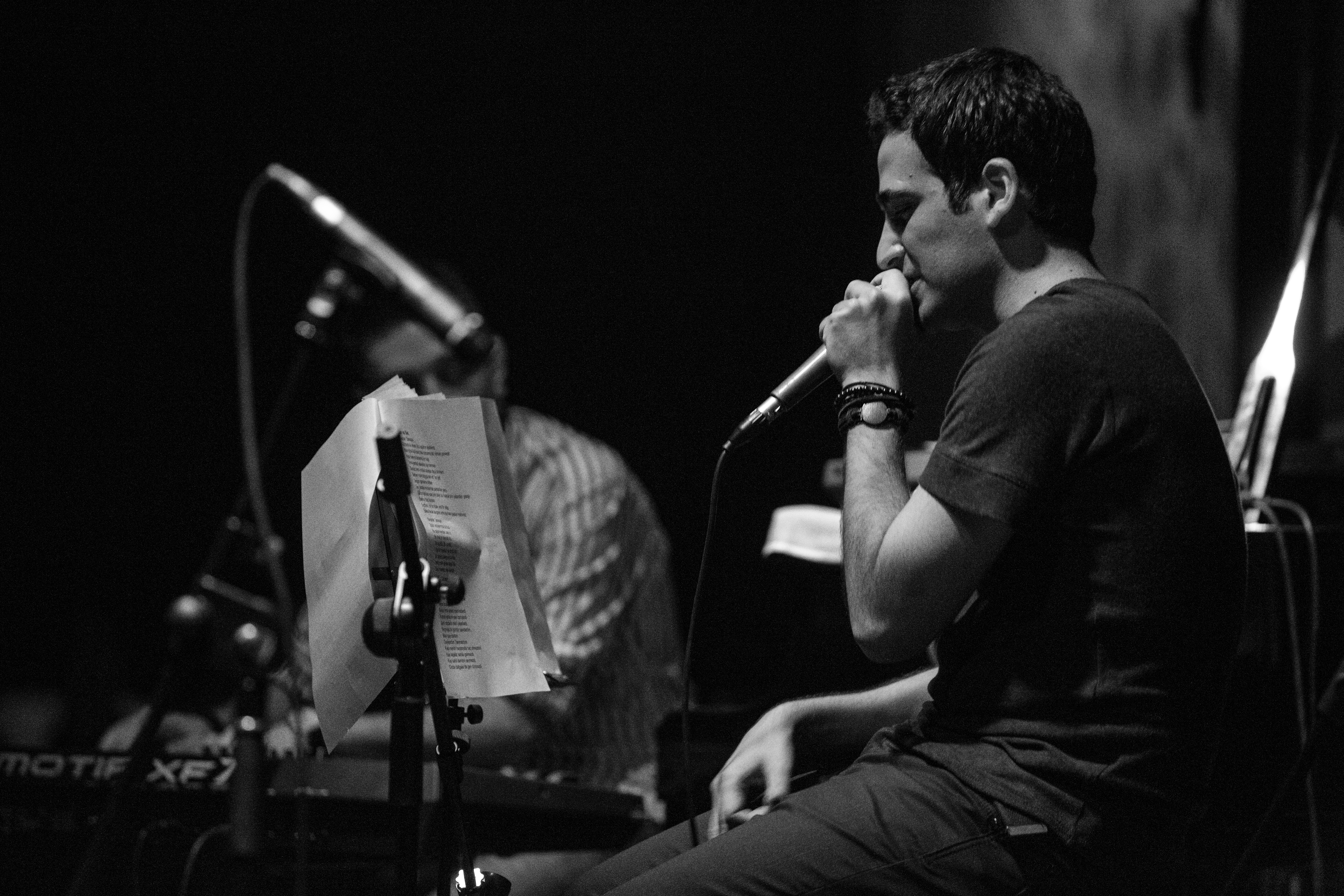
- Elkhan Zeynalli performing at Jazz Centre, 2013.

Background information
- Also known as: BlackBlood, The Crow
- Born: Elkhan Zeynalli; 3 April 1987 (age 39)
- Origin: Baku, Azerbaijan
- Genres: Hip hop, spoken word, jazz
- Occupations: Rapper, singer-songwriter
- Instrument: Vocals
- Years active: 2005–present
- Formerly of: H.O.S.T.

Elkhan Zeynalli, also known by his stage name Qaraqan (Azerbaijani language for 'blackblood'), is an Azerbaijani writer, songwriter, musician, and rapper. Elkhan is the first prize winner of National Book Award 2010. A graduate of the Turkish Lyceum in Baku (TDV-BTL), he studied journalism at Baku State University.

== Music career ==
In 2007, while still a first-year journalism student, he founded and led H.O.S.T. – a pioneering hip-hop group in Azerbaijan. The group's first demo album was released online and amassed thousands of views right away. H.O.S.T. started as a music community, growing into a big movement of creative youth. H.O.S.T. has released two albums: "Proloq" 2007 (eng. Prologue) and "Qarada qırmızı" 2008 (eng. Red in black), and performed on big venues in the Azerbaijan Republic. There was a generation of young people calling themselves "HOSTed", meaning those who follow the ideas described in the songs of the H.O.S.T. group – propaganda of intelligence, justice, free thinking, and personality.

In 2010, Qaraqan started his own project. Royal Pashayev from H.O.S.T. started working with him as a producer and art director. Elkhan has been performing in a unique musical genre – spoken word, acoustic hip-hop and jazz poetry where lyrics and music create a magical tandem. Qaraqan composed upwards of 200 songs throughout his career, crafting compositions for both his musical ensemble and his solo projects. He has released three solo albums: "Qısa Qapanma" 2009 (eng. Short circuit), "Ishiq" 2011 (eng. Light), and "Leykemia" 2013 (eng. Leukemia). These albums propelled Qaraqan to new heights, making him a cult figure in the musical art of Azerbaijan. Qaraqan performed successfully in Norwegian Embassy of the Azerbaijan Republic, Ankara and Istanbul (Turkey) on a two-week tour, in Moscow (Russia) and other cities throughout the world. In 2015, Qaraqan performed in Austin, Texas, as an official representative of SXSW Festival.

== Writing career ==
Simultaneously, Qaraqan is renowned as a prominent author, having achieved fame for his literary works. He has published 7 novels, all of which became bestsellers in his homeland. He has received a presidential scholarship for achievements in literature, was announced "The Author of the Year 2010," and won the first prize at the National Book Award for his novel "A," which was written when he was 20 years old. Elkhan's novel "A" and "Mələk" (eng. Angel) were translated into Russian and English. Qaraqan is a member of Union of Azerbaijani Writers, the largest public organization of Azerbaijani writers, poets, and publicists. In 2014, he became one of the members of the council of the Union.

== Revival in 2023 ==
After six years of silence following his move to the USA, Qaraqan made a resurgence in late 2023, releasing his new track "Söz" and ten more songs after. His new presence on social media is a project. The aim of this project is to gather together the youth of Azerbaijan. Thousands of people have gathered under the name of First Degree. Among these youth, there are directors, artists, students, businessmen, athletes, musicians, schoolchildren, and young people. First Degree is the first phase of a pre-planned project, and Qaraqan is keeping the future a secret. Everyone is invited to the First Degree, and there are no eligibility rules. The aim of Qaraqan's new movement is to bring about a Renaissance in Azerbaijan.

A part of this movement concerns the creation of a new, decentralized, and free publication platform called "Intibah" (eng Renaissance). The purpose is to encourage intellectual people to submit their literary works and have a chance to be published on this platform founded by Qaraqan.

== Discography ==
- H.O.S.T. "Proloq" 2007 (eng. Prologue)
- H.O.S.T. "Qarada Qırmızı" 2008 (eng. Red in Black)
- Qaraqan "Qısa Qapanma" 2009 (eng. Short Circuit)
- Qaraqan "İşıq" 2011 (eng. Light)
- Qaraqan "Leykemiya" 2013 (eng. Leukemia)

== Books ==
- "A romanı" 2007 (eng. A)
- "Bir Milyon Dollarım Olsaydı" 2009 (eng. If I had a million dollars)
- "Исповедь Одного Извращенца" 2011 (eng. Confession of one pervert)
- "Mələk" 2012 (eng. Angel)
- "Evakuasiya" 2013 (eng. Evacuation)
- "Birinci addım. Beş anonim milyonçu" 2013 (eng. Step one. Five anonymous millionaires)
- "İkinci addım. Həqiqətin beş adı" 2014 (eng. Step two. Five names of truth)
- "Üçüncü addım" 2016 (eng. Step three Numerical forest )
- "Art və Xaos" 2019 (eng. Art and Chaos)
