= Dayirman =

- Origin: Baku, Azerbaijan
- Genres: Hip Hop, Political Rap
- Years active: 1996–2012
- Past members: Miri Yusif; Anar Abdullah; L-Mir; ABD Malik

Dayirman (Azerbaijani: Dəyirman) was the first Azerbaijani hip hop group, based in Baku and was founded in 1996 by four friends. The word Dayirman means windmill in Azerbaijani language. The group fuses hip-hop with elements of traditional Meykhana poetry.

== Discography ==
- "Qurd" (2001)
