= Miri Yusif =

Azerbaijani singer (born 1977)

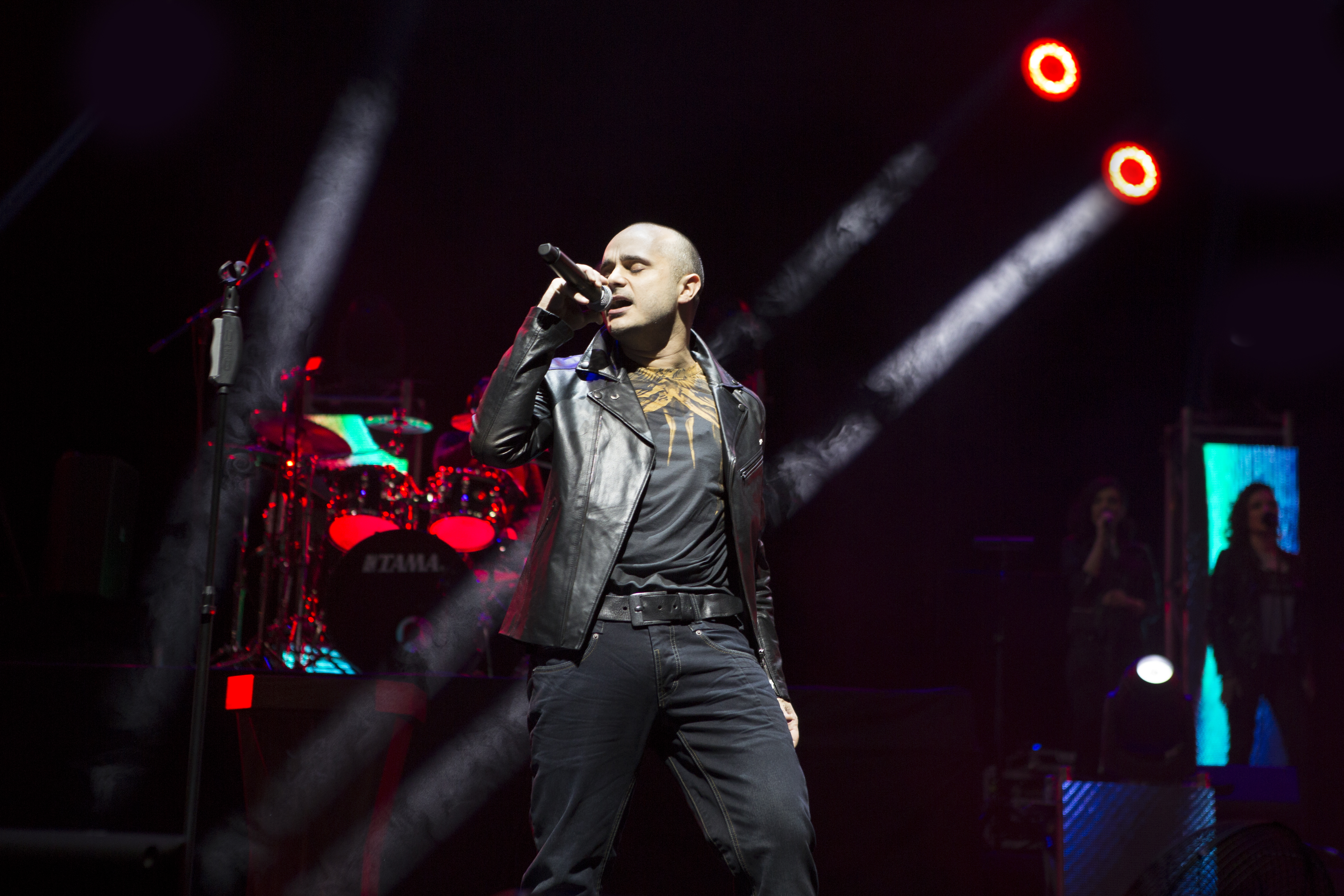

Background information
- Born: 27 October 1977 (age 47); Baku, Azerbaijani SSR, USSR
- Genres: Hip hop, acoustic, soul
- Occupations: Rapper, singer, songwriter, actor, director
- Instrument: Vocals
- Years active: 1996–present
- Formerly of: Dayirman
- Website: www.miriyusif.com

Mir Yusif Mir Heydar oglu Mirbabayev (Azerbaijani: Miryusif Mirheydər oğlu Mirbabayev, Мирјусиф Мирһејдәр оғлу Мирбабајев, born 27 October 1977), better known as Miri Yusif, is an Azerbaijani rapper, singer, songwriter and director. Miri Yusif first emerged as a hip hop artist, part of Dayirman, which released their debut album Qurd in 2001.

In 2010s, despite the commercial dominance of hip-hop during this period, he found success with his reggae and soul fusion album "Karma", peaked at number 1 in the Azerbaijani Albums Chart in 2010.
