= H.O.S.T. =

Azerbaijani hip hop group

- Origin: Baku, Azerbaijan
- Genres: Hip Hop, political rap
- Years active: 2007–2012
- Past members: Garagan; PRoMete; AiD; Feck; ErranT; Felon De Jure; Darvish; Jamal Ali

H.O.S.T. was an influential Azerbaijani hip hop group, based in Baku.

The group's name derives from abbreviations of the classical elements in Azerbaijani language, which means hava (air), od (fire), su (water) and torpaq (earth).

The group was active for five years and released seven studio albums. The group disbanded in 2012, after each member went down his own path, though some have briefly worked together.

== Discography ==
- Proloq (2007)
- Qarada Qırmızı (2008)
- Qısa Qapanma (2009)
- EP v.01 (2009)
- Biz İnsan Deyilik (2010)
- 14 (2011)
- İşıq (2011)
