= List of Azerbaijanis =

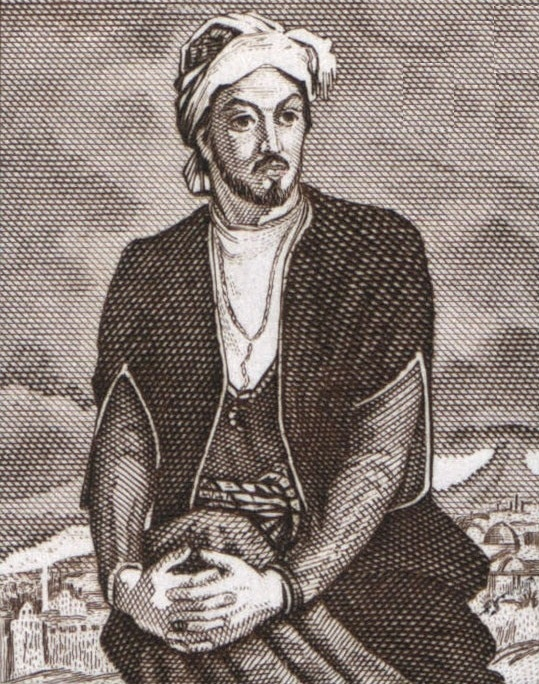
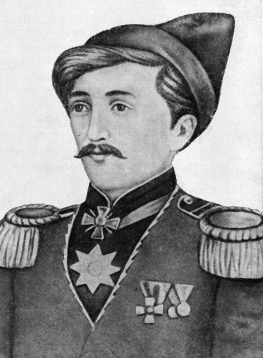
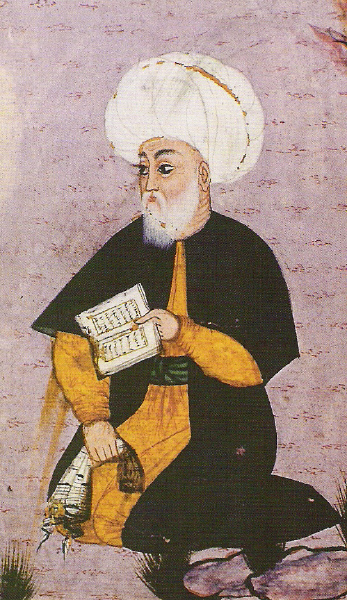
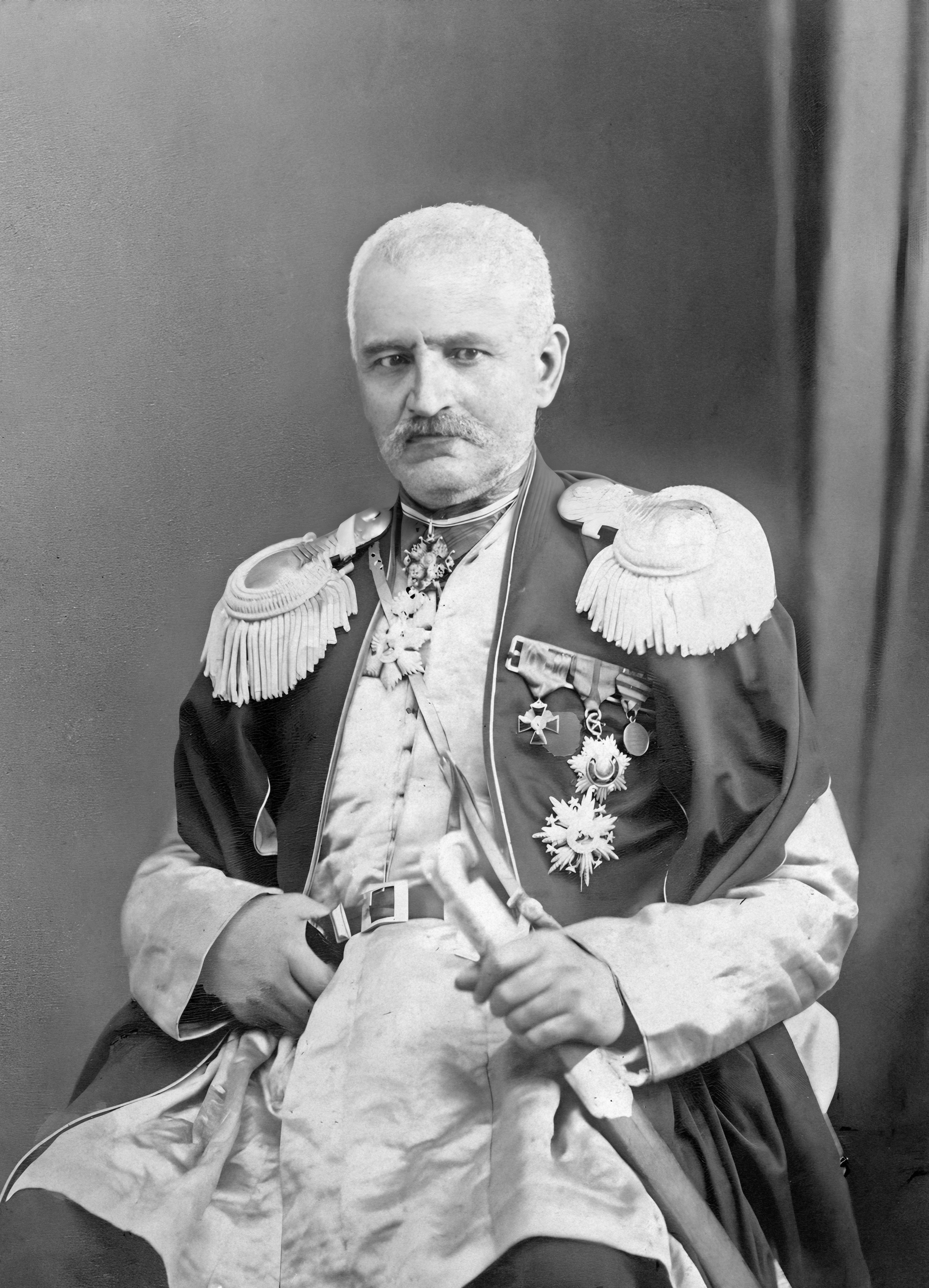
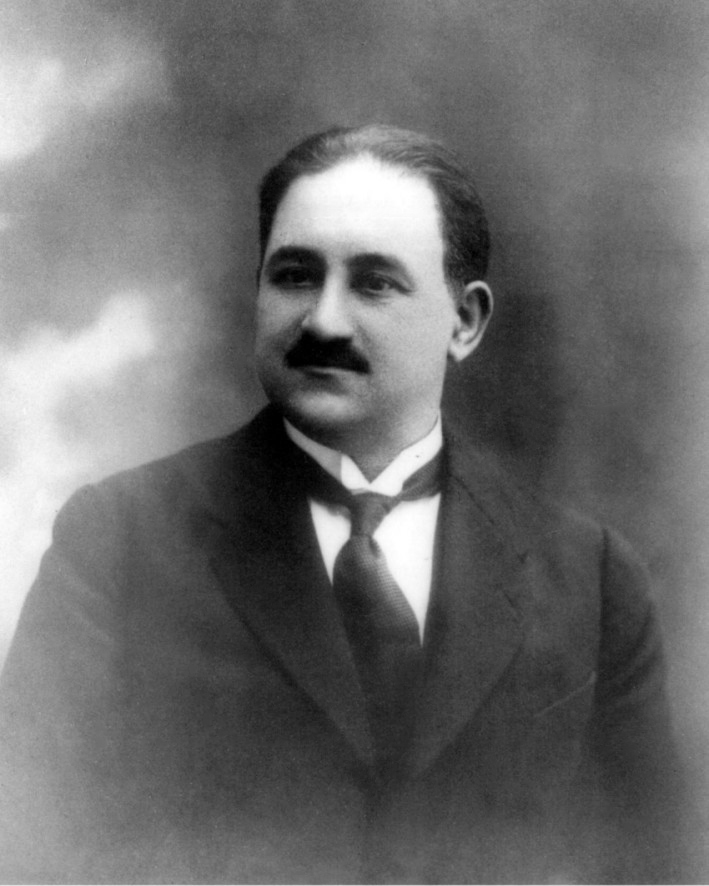
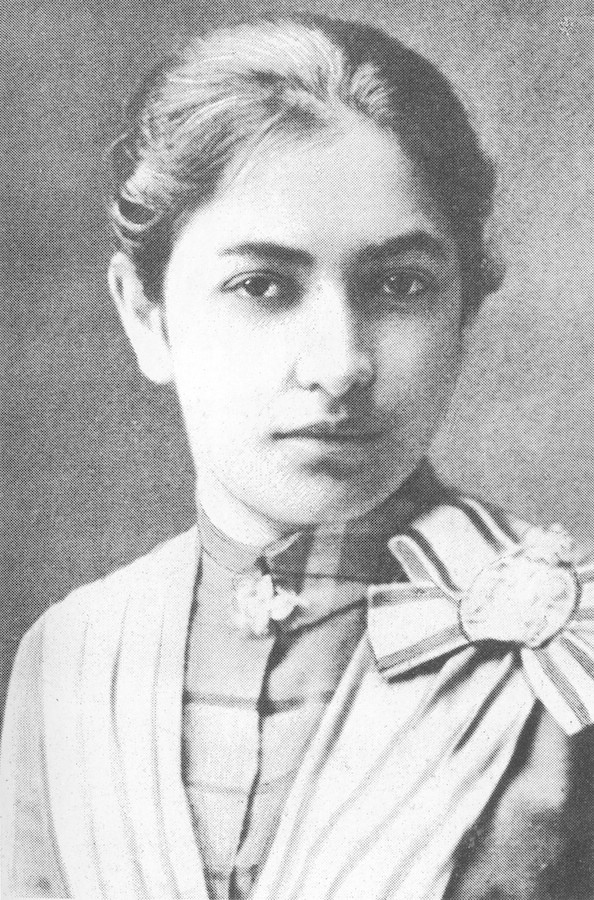
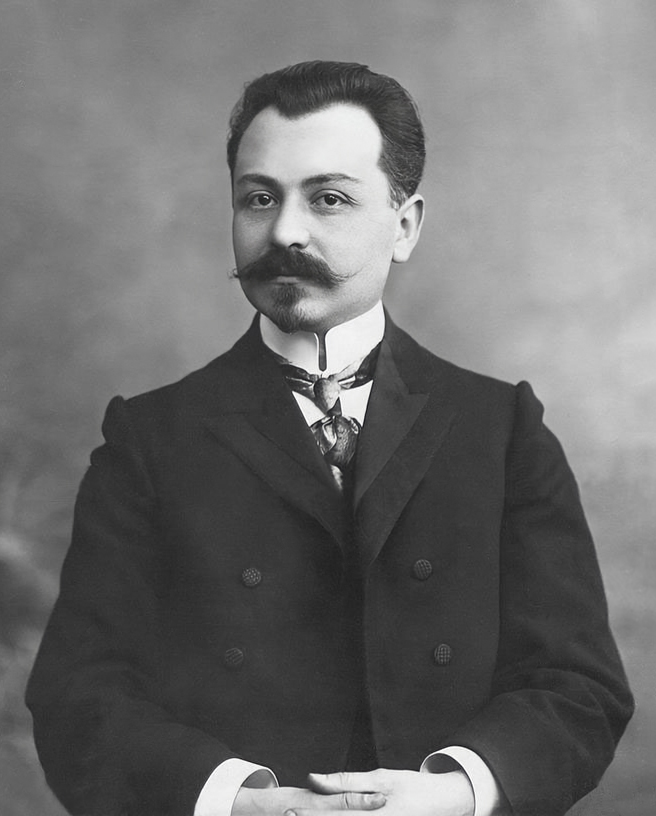
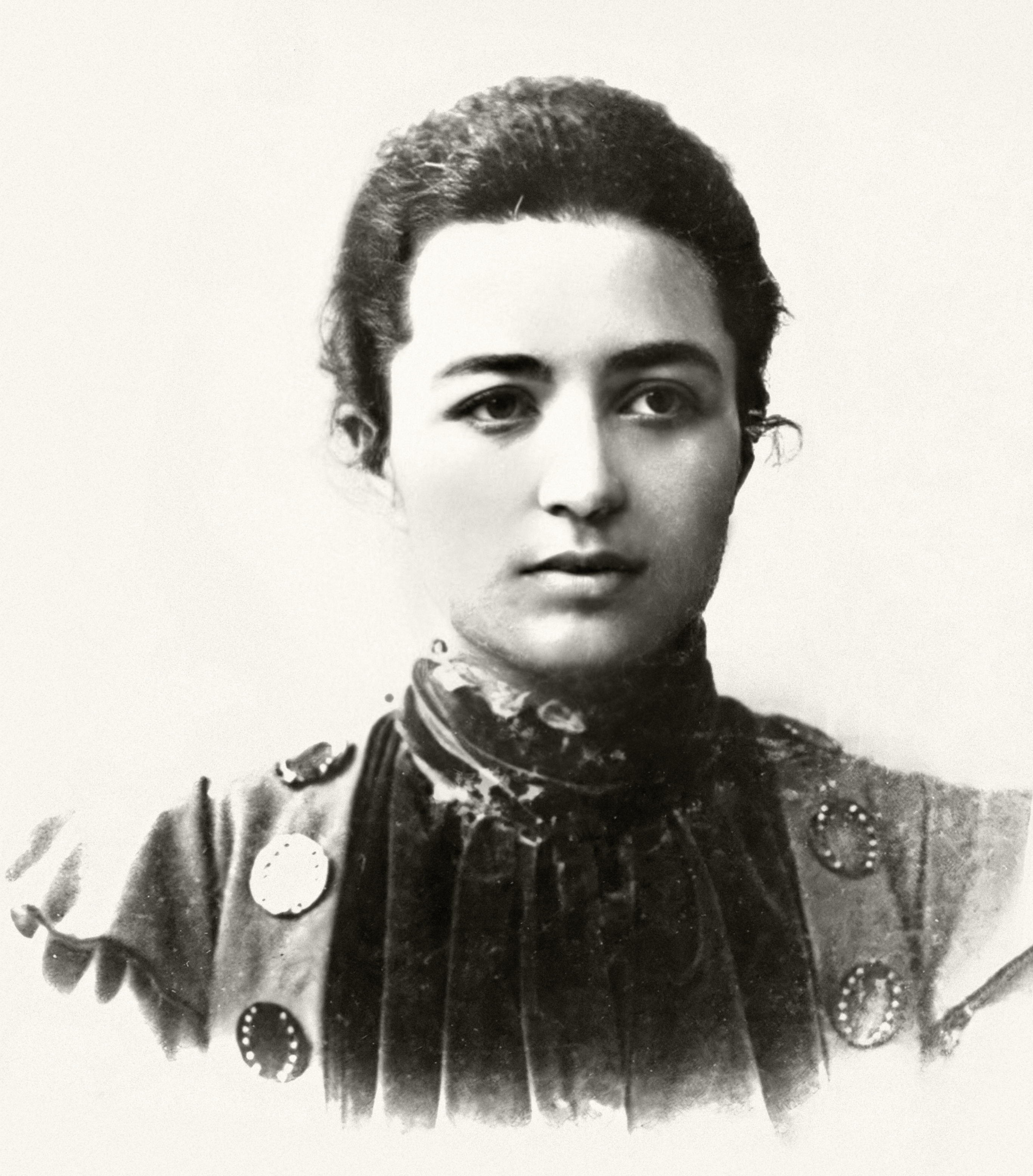
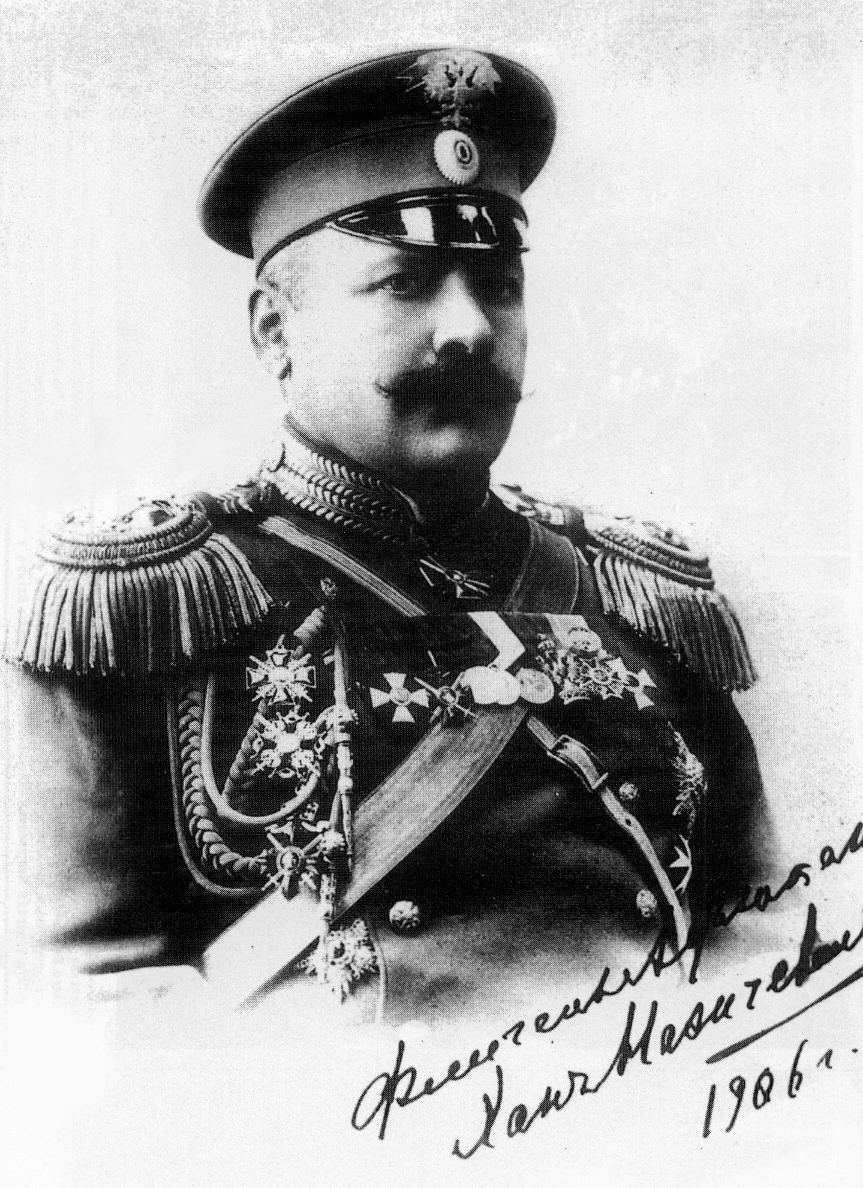
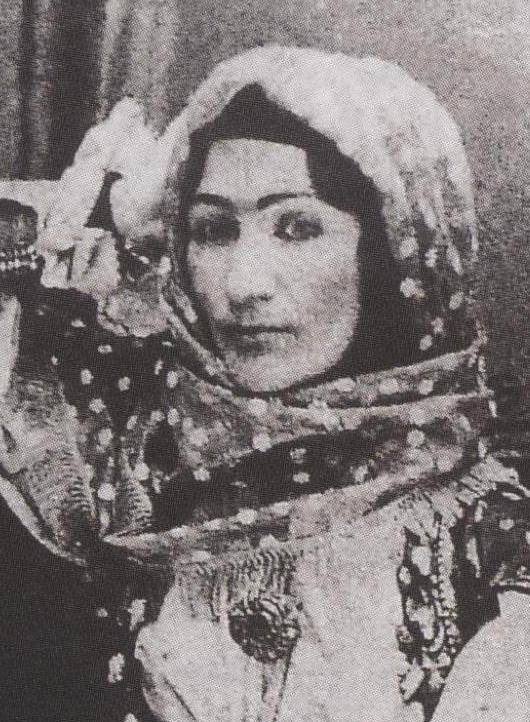
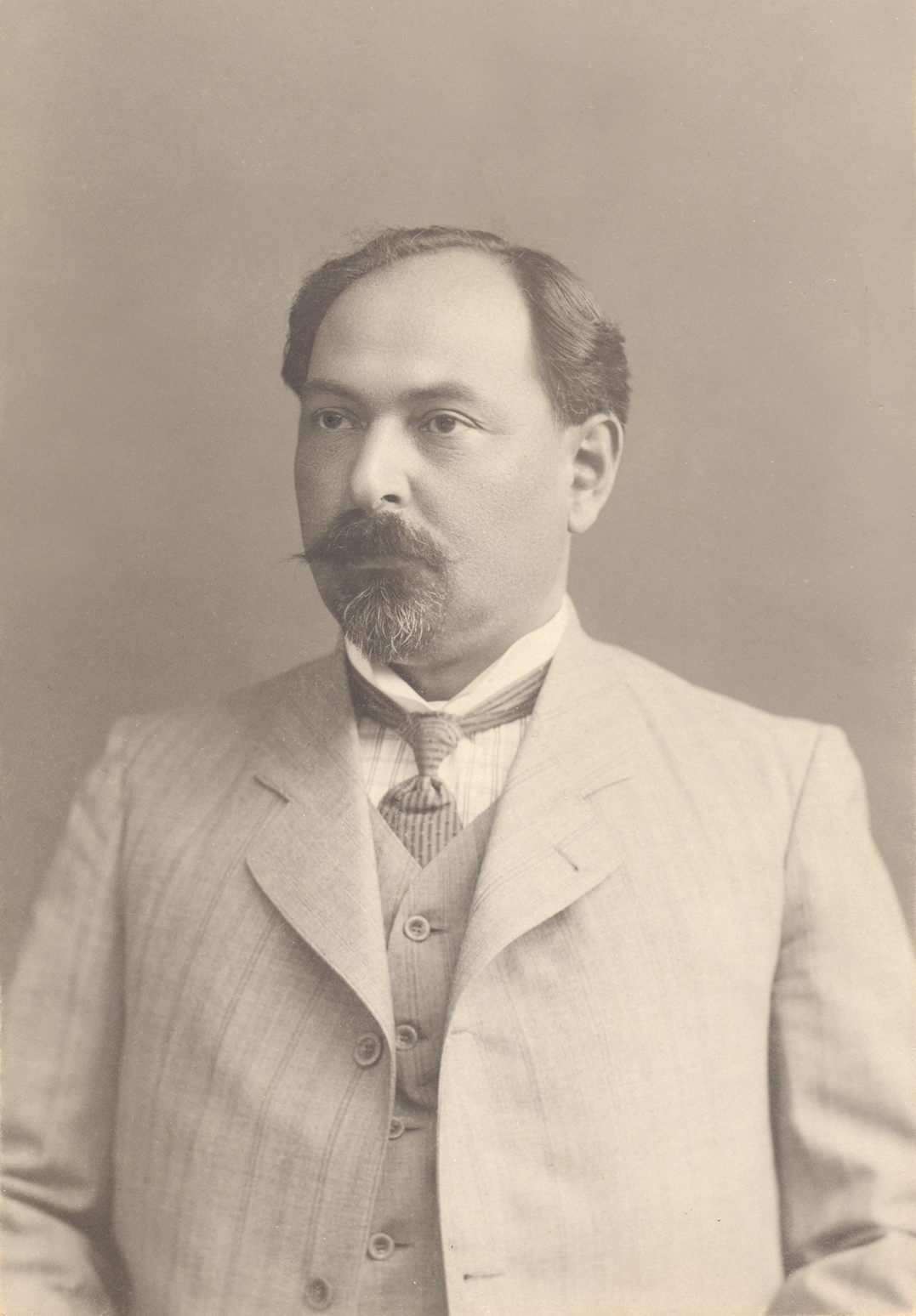
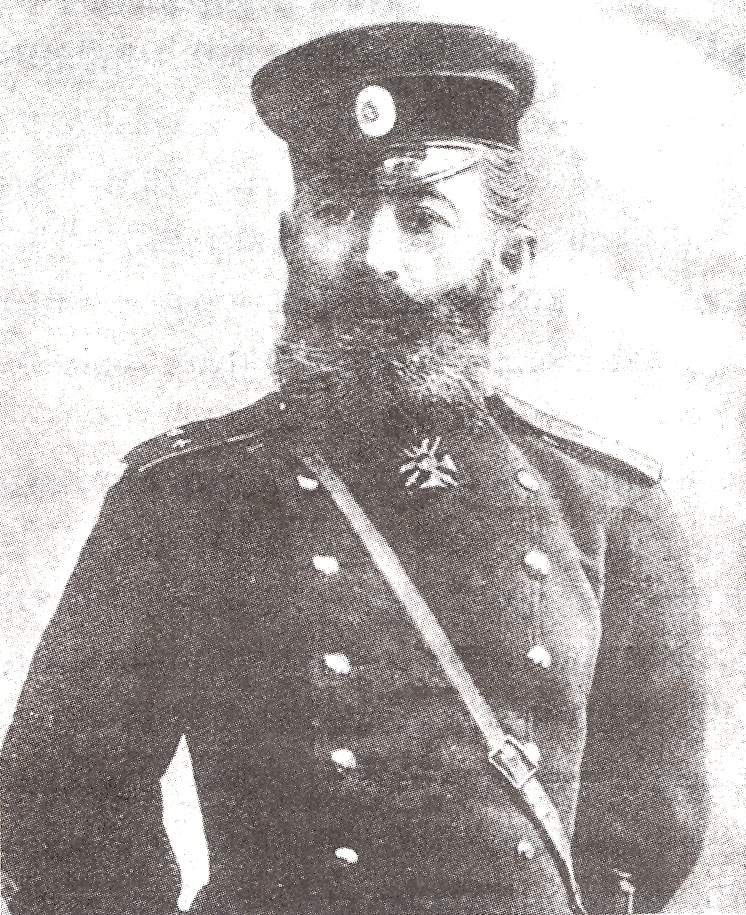
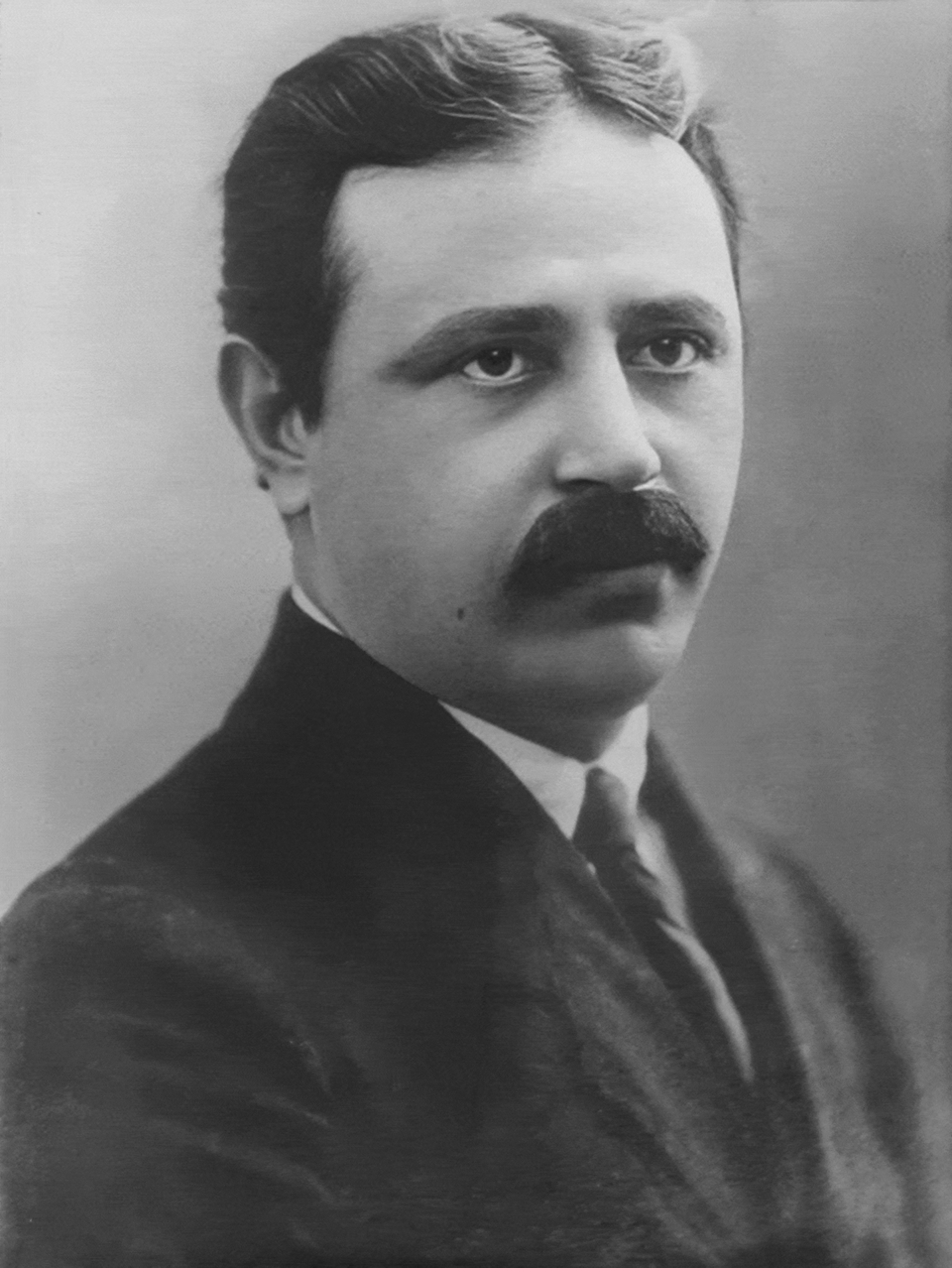
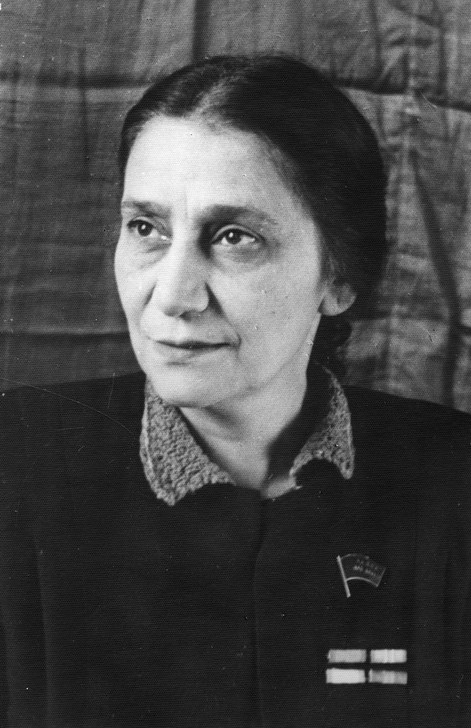
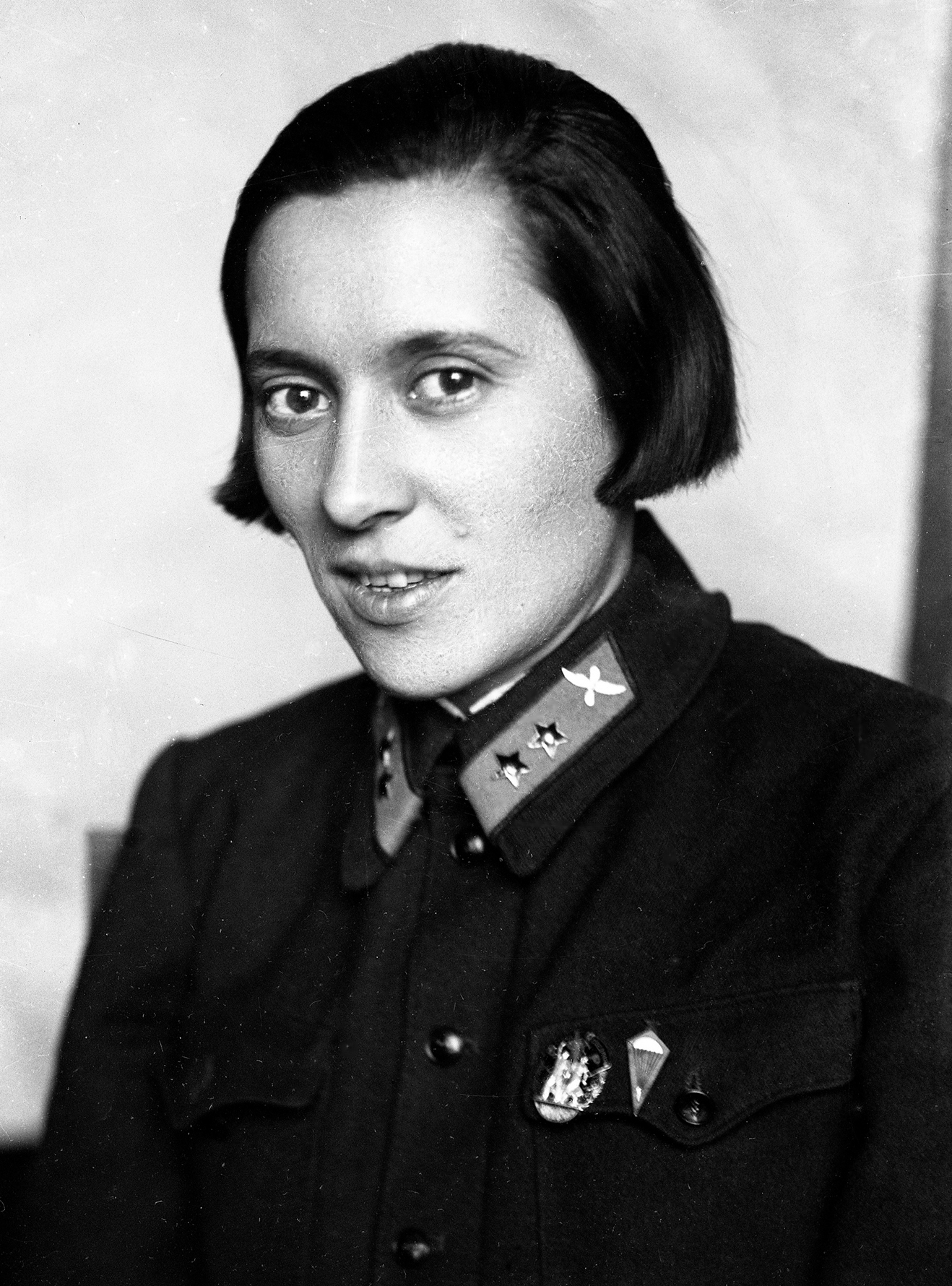
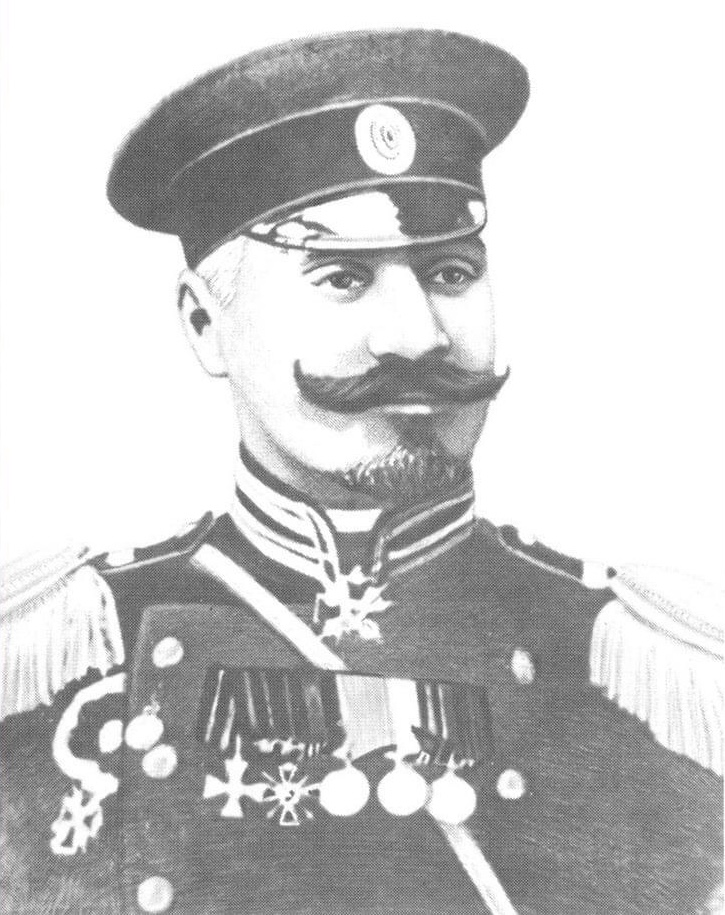
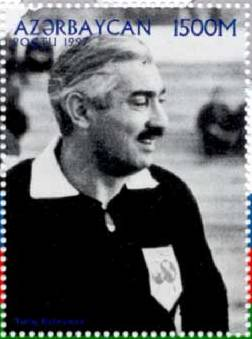
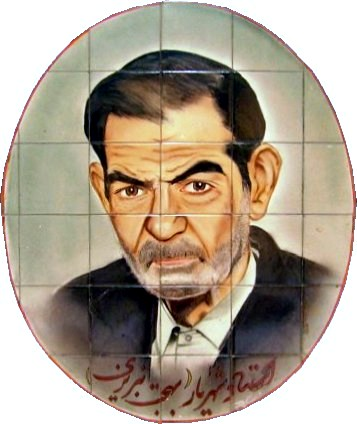
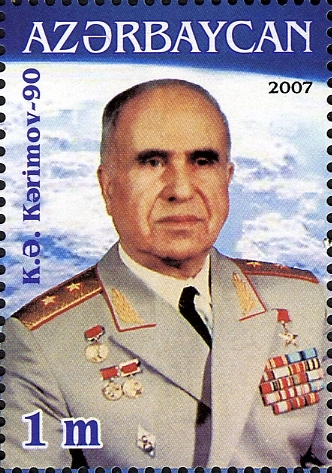
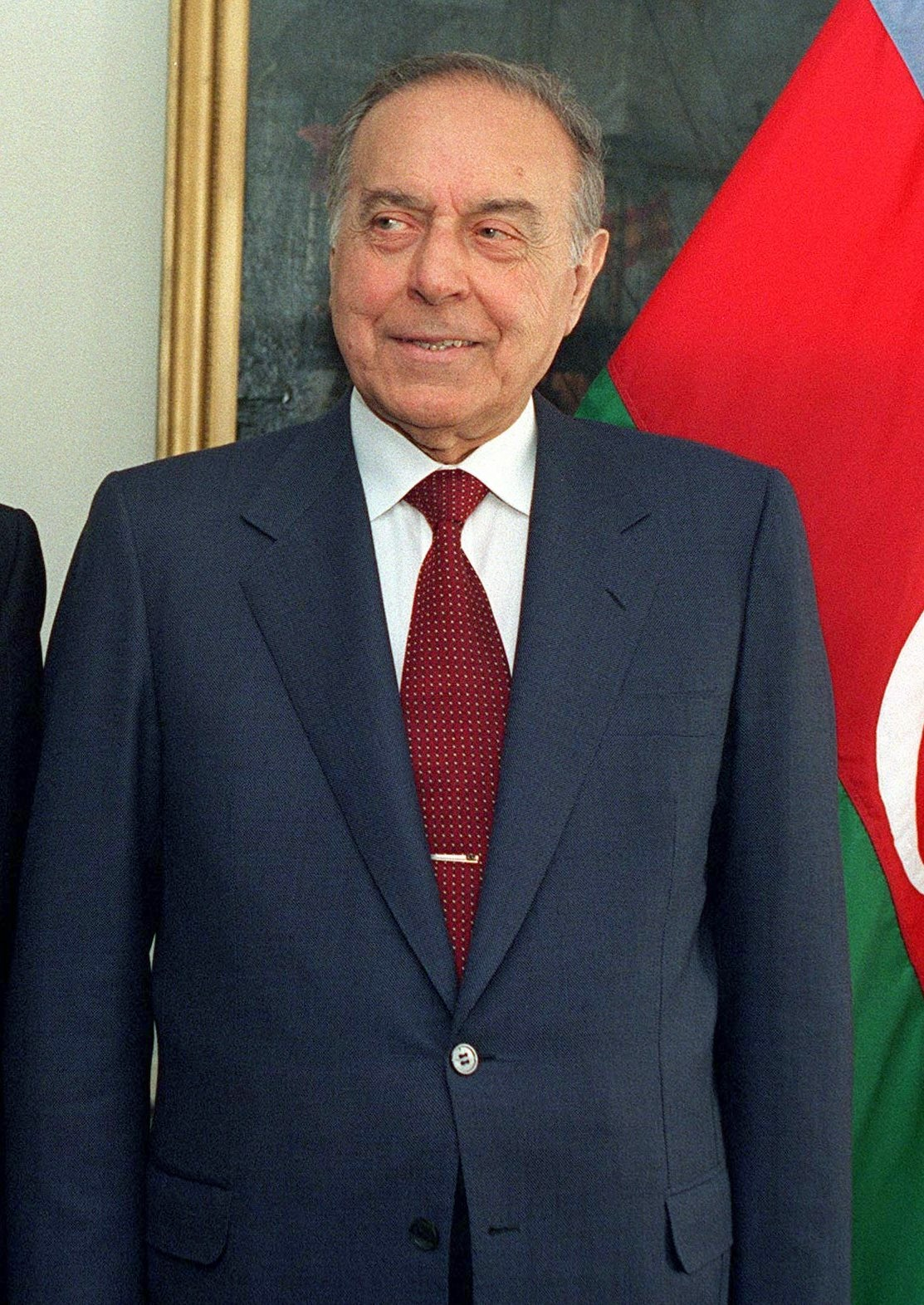
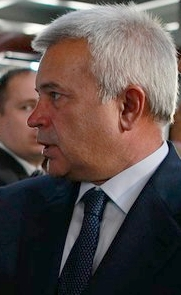
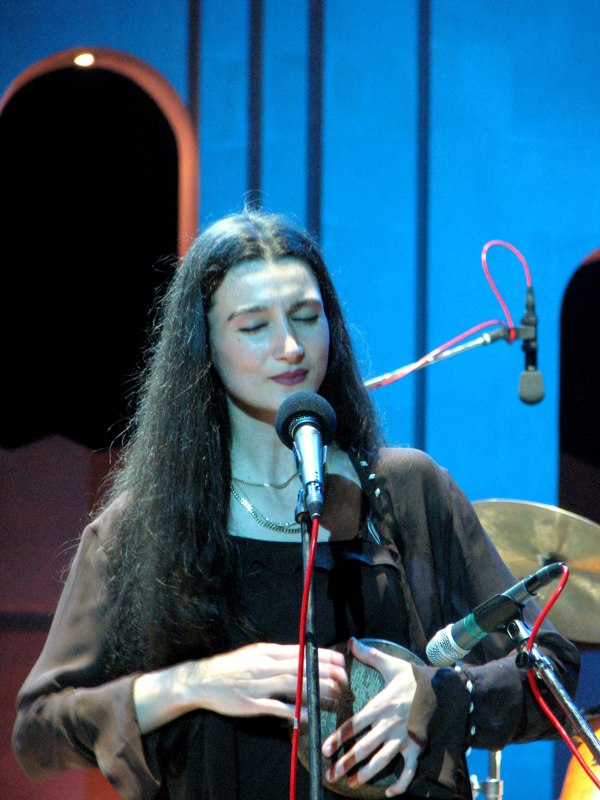
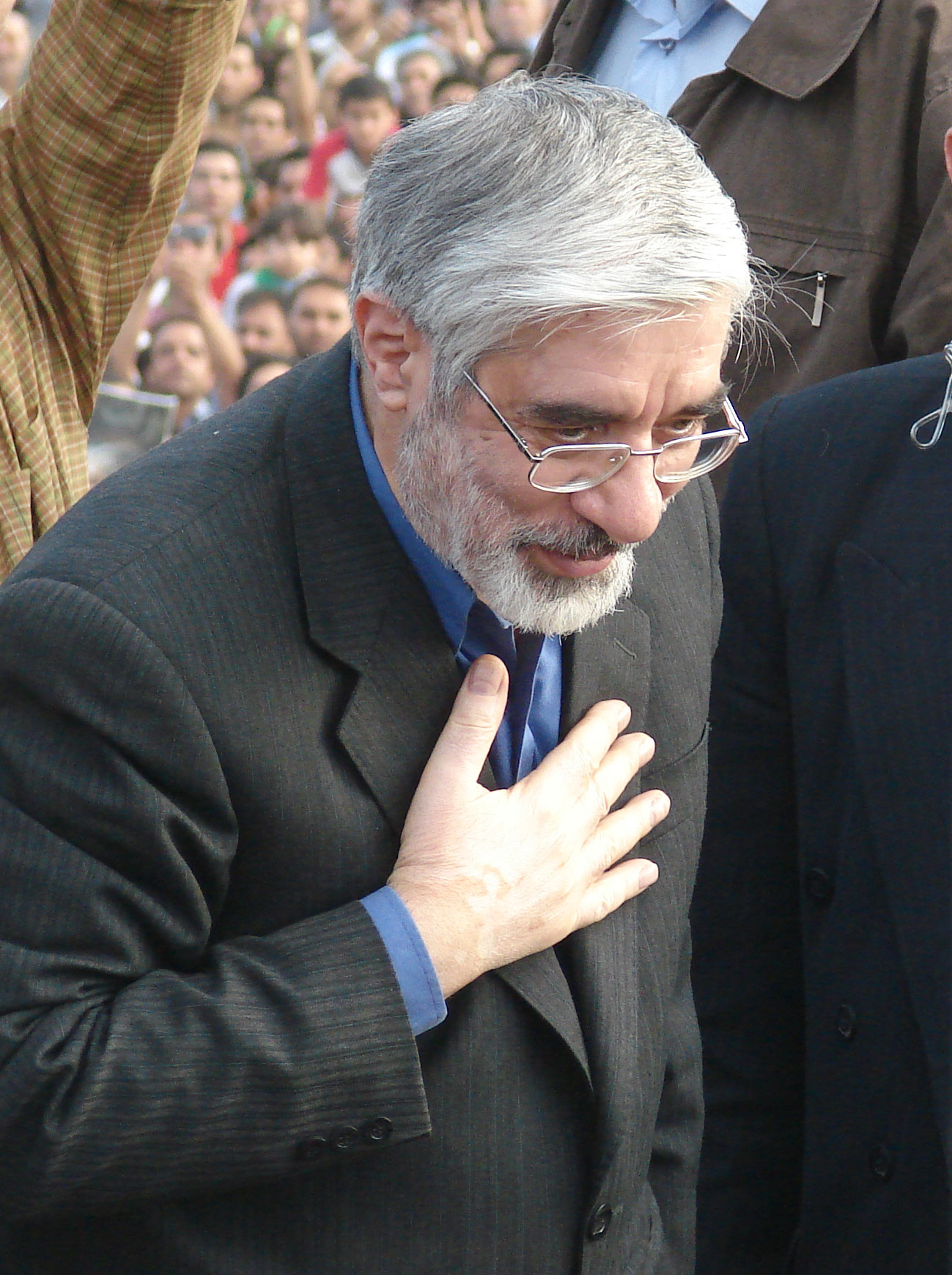
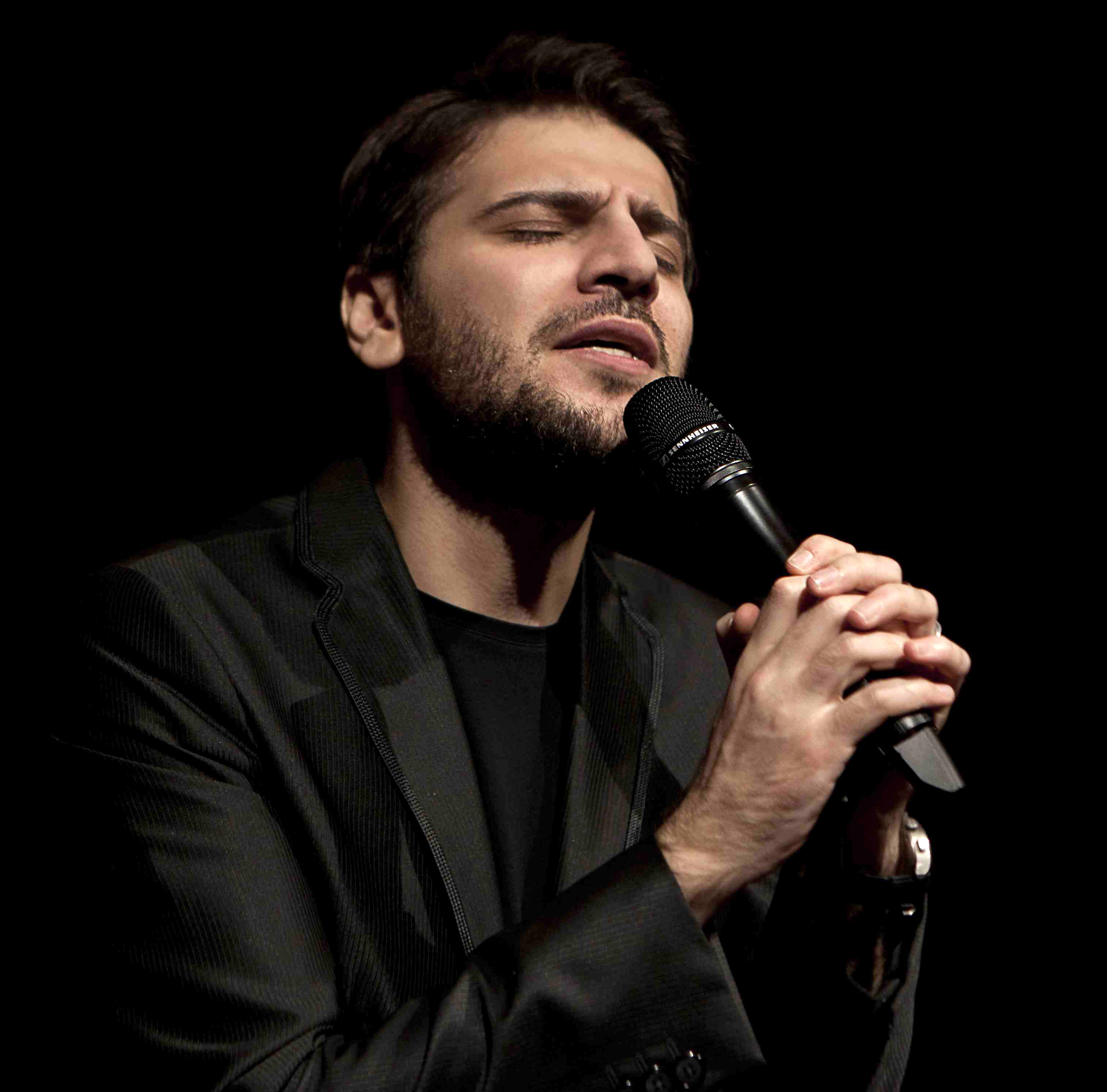
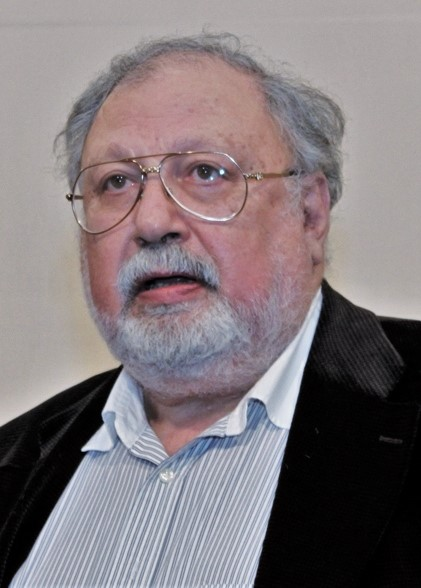
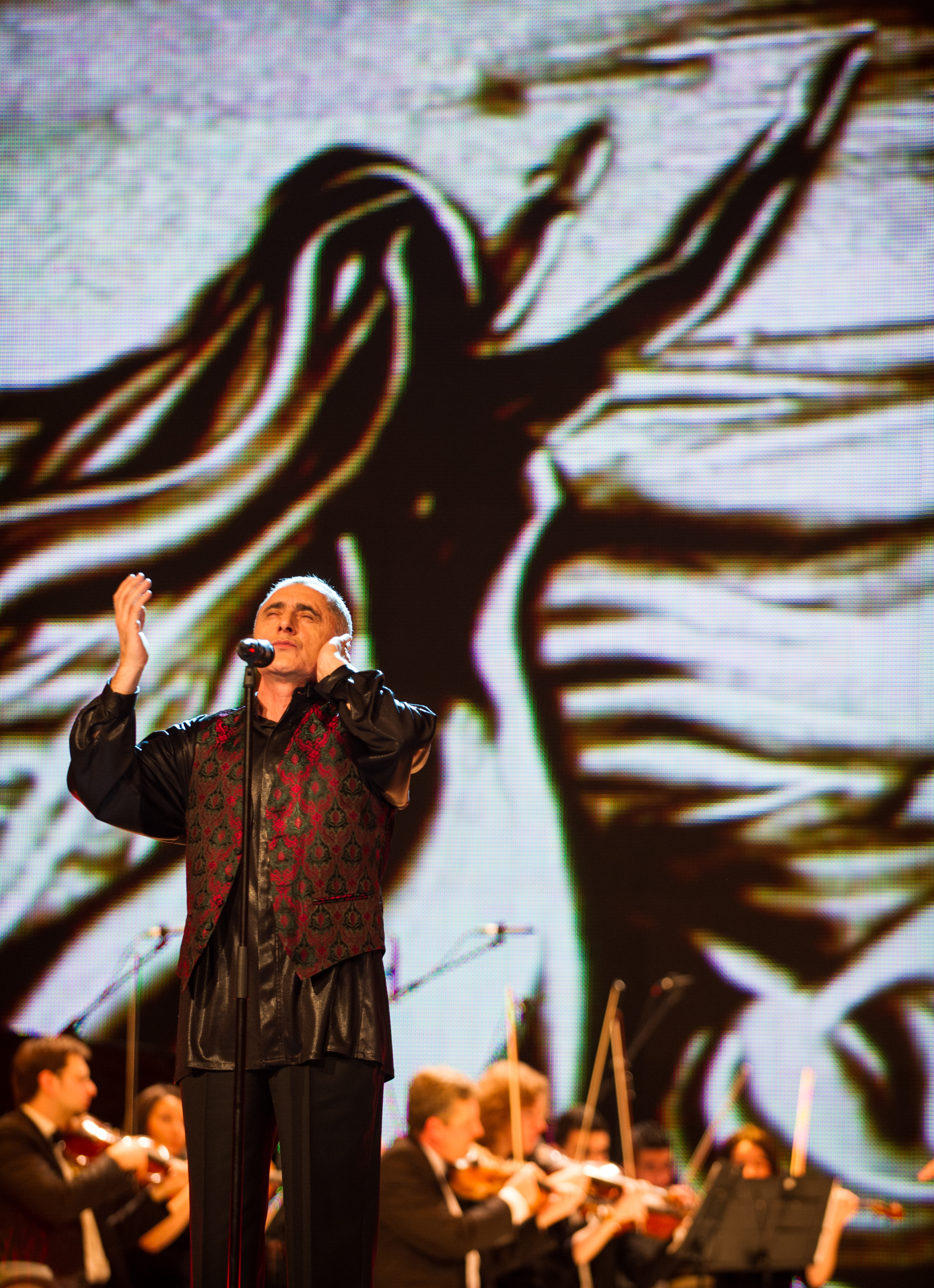
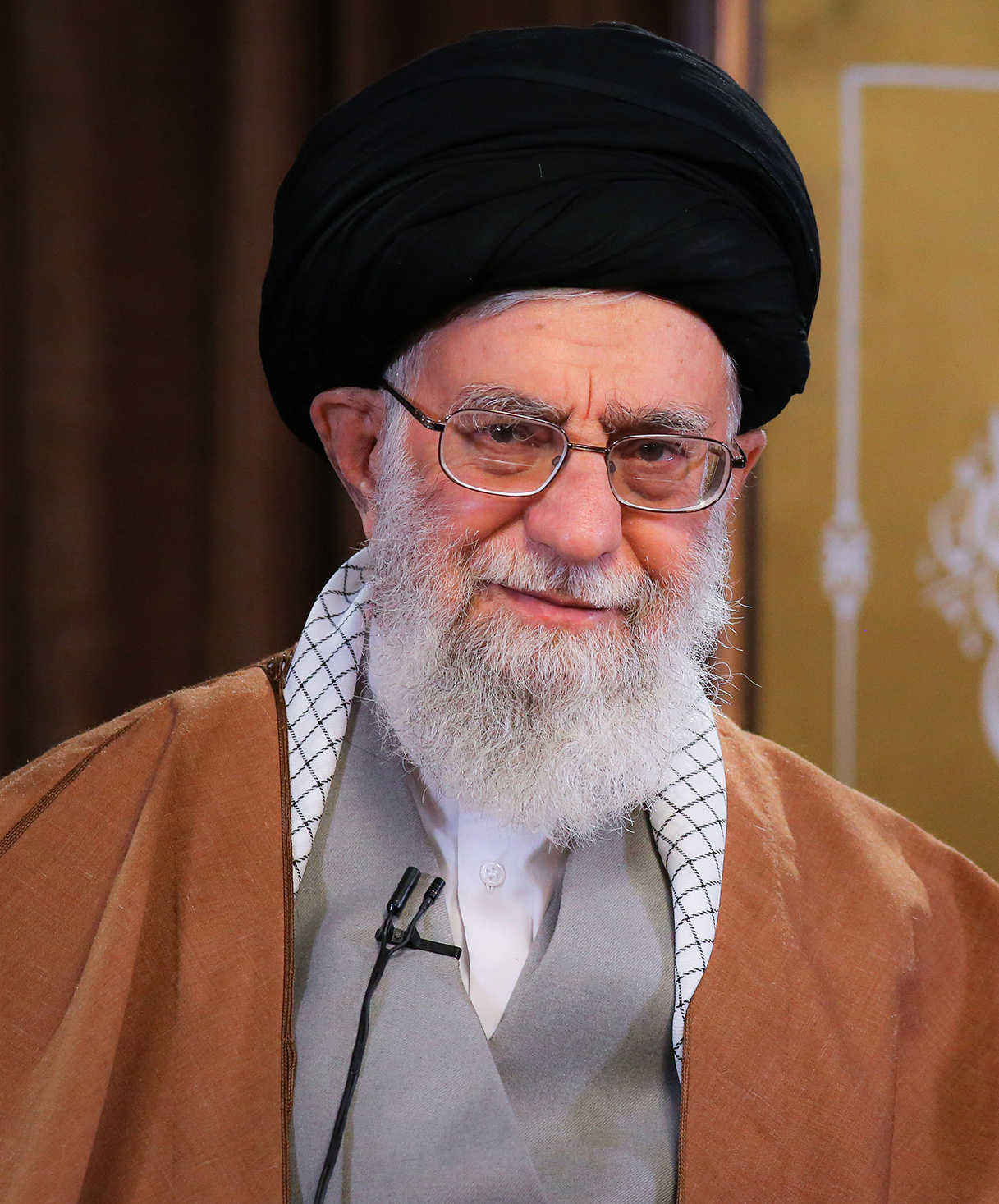
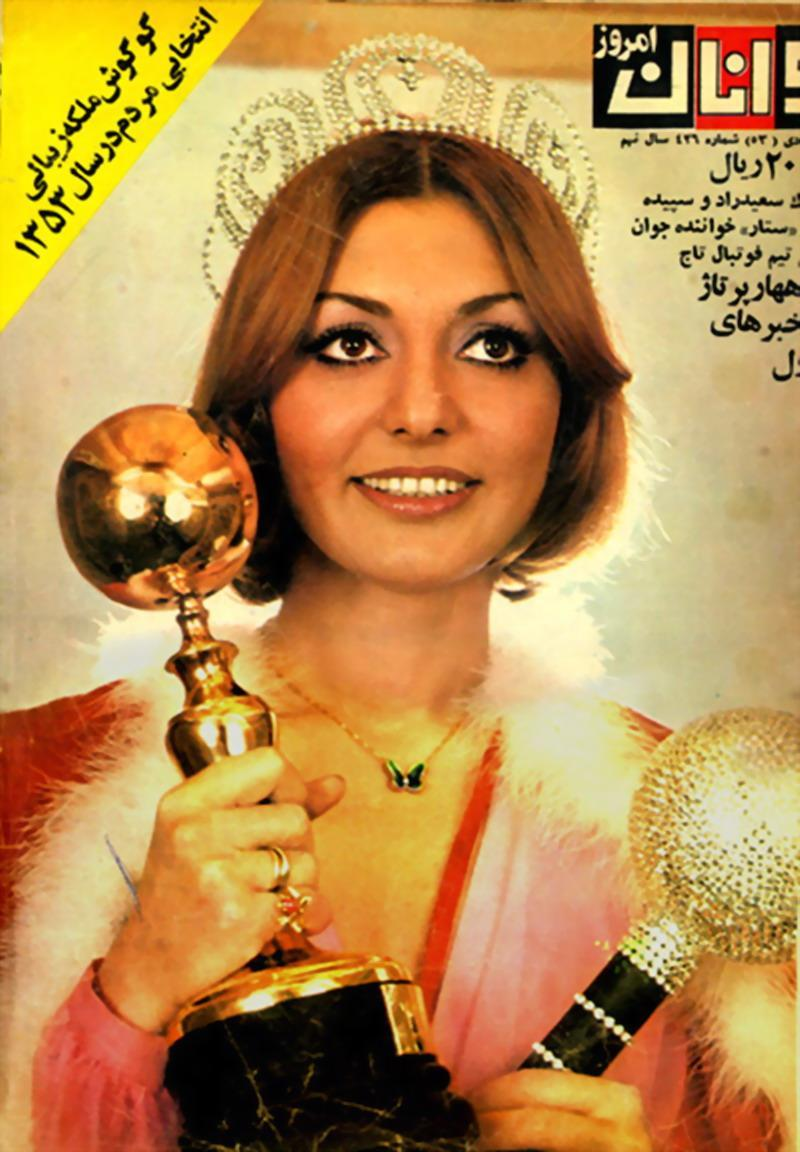
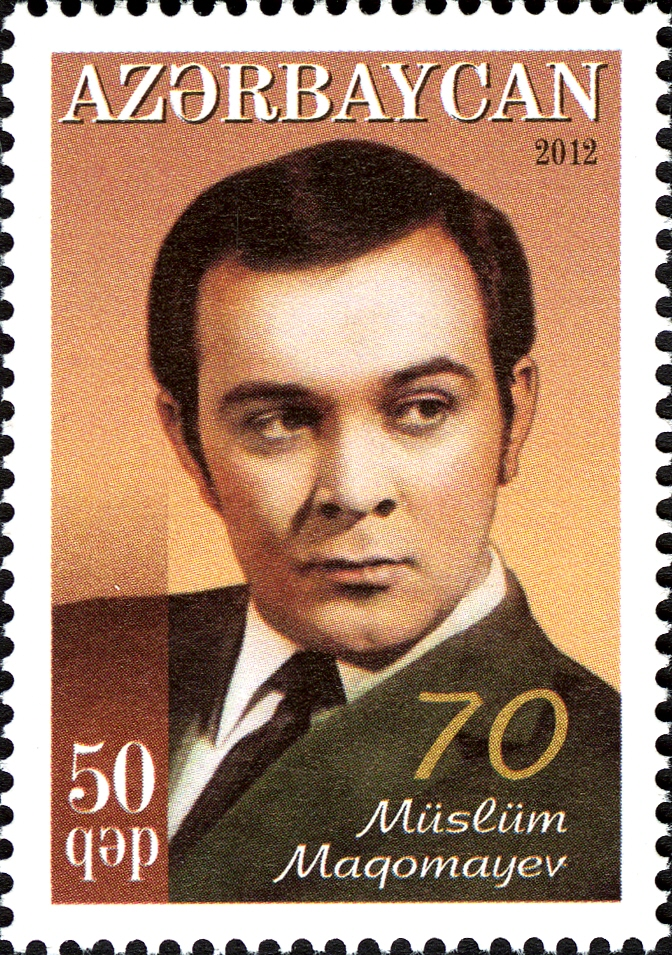
Nasimi	Qudsi	Fuzuli	Akhundov	Rasulzade
Shikhlinskaya	Khoysky	Javanshir	Nakhchivanski	Natavan
Narimanov	Mehmandarov	Hajibeyov	Mammadova	Mammadbeyova
Shikhlinski	Bahramov	Shahriar	Kerimov	Aliyev
Alekperov	Mustafazadeh	Mousavi	Sami Yusuf	Lotfi Zadeh
Ibragimbekov	Alim Qasimov	Khamenei	Googoosh	Magomayev

Ethnographic map of Azerbaijanis in the Caucasus (1995)

This is a list of notable Azerbaijanis — speakers of the Azerbaijani language, a Turkic language with deep roots in indigenous Iranian (Median) and Caucasian populations and later Oghuz Turkic influence. They predominantly live in the Iranian provinces of East and West Azerbaijan; Republic of Azerbaijan; southern Dagestan and Georgia; and parts of eastern Turkey (notably the provinces of Kars and Iğdır).

== Azerbaijan ==
=== Academics ===
- Jafar Abdollahi-Sharif (born 1963), president of Urmia University of Technology

=== Actors ===
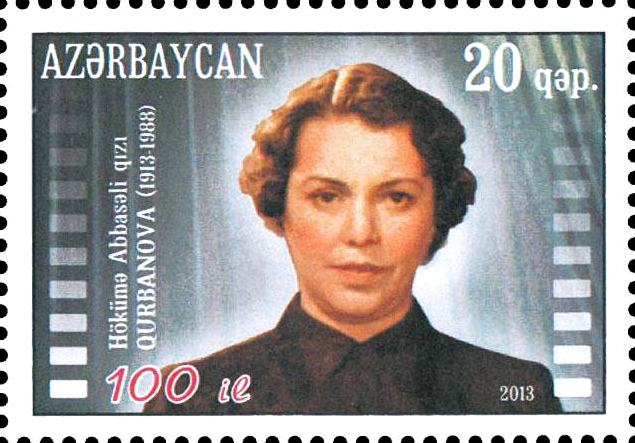
Hokuma Gurbanova

- Lutfali Abdullayev (1914–1973), actor
- Telman Adigozalov (1953–2010), actor
- Aliagha Aghayev (1913–1983), actor
- Alasgar Alakbarov (1910–1963), actor
- Mirzaagha Aliyev (1883–1954), actor
- Huseyn Arablinski (1881–1919), actor
- Sayavush Aslan (1935–2013), actor
- Mirza Babayev (1903–2003), actor and singer
- Shamsi Badalbeyli (1911–1986), theatre director and actor
- Leyla Badirbeyli (1920–1999), actress
- Hajibaba Baghirov (1932–2006), actor
- Bahram Bagirzade (born 1972), actor, entertainer, comedian and film director
- Rasim Balayev (born 1948), actor
- Afag Bashirgyzy (born 1955), actress
- Aghasadyg Garaybeyli (1897–1988), actor
- Hokuma Gurbanova (1913–1988), actress
- Nesrin Javadzadeh (born 1982), actress
- Javanshir Hadiyev (born 1969), actor
- Munavvar Kalantarli (1912–1962), actress and folk singer
- Aygün Kazımova (born 1971), actress and singer
- Fakhraddin Manafov (born 1955), actor
- Jeyhun Mirzayev (1946–1993), actor and film director
- Yashar Nuri (1951–2012), actor
- Hamida Omarova (born 1957), actress
- Hagigat Rzayeva (1907–1969), actress and singer
- Latif Safarov (1920–1963), actor and film director
- Barat Shakinskaya (1914–1999), actress
- Abbas Mirza Sharifzadeh (1893–1938), actor and film director
- Rza Tahmasib (1894–1980), actor
- Hasanagha Turabov (1938–2003), actor
- Eldaniz Zeynalov (1937–2001), actor
- Nasiba Zeynalova (1916–2004), actress

=== Archaeologists and anthropologists ===
- Jeyhun Hajibeyli (1891–1962), ethnographer and journalist
- Mammadali Huseynov (1922–1994), archaeologist
- Ishag Jafarzadeh (1895–1982), archaeologist and ethnographer

=== Architects ===
- Sadig Dadashov (1905–1946), architect
- Gasim bey Hajibababeyov (1811–1874), architect
- Mammad Hasan Hajinski (1875–1931), architect and statesman
- Mikayil Huseynov (1905–1992), architect
- Karbalayi Safikhan Karabakhi (1817–1910), architect
- Kamal Mammadbeyov (1924–1997), architect

=== Artists ===
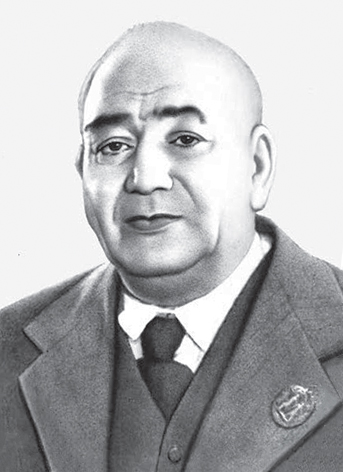
Azim Azimzade was an Azerbaijani artist and prominent cartoonist.

- Mikail Abdullayev (1921–2002), painter
- Fuad Abdurahmanov (1915–1971), sculptor
- Azim Azimzade (1880–1943), painter and graphic artist and the founder of Azerbaijani satirical graphics
- Sattar Bahlulzadeh (1909–1974), impressionist painter
- Omar Eldarov (born 1927), sculptor
- Jalal Garyaghdi (1914–2001), sculptor
- Mirza Kadym Irevani (1835–1875), artist
- Bahruz Kangarli (1892–1922), painter, graphic artist and the founder of realistic easel painting of Azerbaijan
- Tokay Mammadov (1927–2018), sculptor
- Boyukagha Mirzazade (1921–2007), painter
- Rustam Mustafayev (1910–1940), scenic designer
- Togrul Narimanbekov (1930–2013), painter
- Vidadi Narimanbekov (1926–2001), painter
- Mir Mohsun Navvab (1833–1918), calligrapher, poet, artist, music historian, astronomer, carpenter, chemist and mathematician
- Maral Rahmanzade (1916–2008), graphic artist
- Alakbar Rezaguliyev (1903–1974), painter
- Tahir Salahov (1928–2021), painter
- Fuad Salayev (born 1943), sculptor
- Gayyur Yunus (born 1948), painter

=== Broadcasters ===
- Mirshahin Agayev (born 1963), TV presenter and journalist
- Leyla Aliyeva (born 1986), TV presenter
- Salatyn Asgarova (1961–1991), killed by Armenian militias
- Nargiz Birk-Petersen (born 1976), TV presenter
- Emin Efendi, TV presenter and record producer
- Rafig Hashimov, newscaster and screenwriter
- Chingiz Mustafayev (1960–1992), one of the most notable independent Azerbaijani journalists
- Sevinj Osmanqizi (born 1969), TV presenter, media personality, author and journalist

=== Businessmen ===
Zeynalabdin Taghiyev, a national industrial magnate and philanthropist accompanied by his daughter Leyla and his grandchildren

- Aras Agalarov (born 1955), businessman
- Farkhad Akhmedov (born 1955), businessman
- Vagit Alekperov (born 1950), businessman
- Shamsi Asadullayev (1840–1913), industrial oil magnate and philanthropist
- Nigar Kocharli (born 1975), bookshop chain owner
- Hafiz Mammadov (born 1964), businessman
- Mubariz Mansimov (born 1968), businessman
- Murtuza Mukhtarov (1865–1920), industrial oil magnate and philanthropist
- Musa Nagiyev (1849–1919), industrial oil magnate and philanthropist
- God Nisanov (born 1972), Jewish-Azerbaijani businessman; the youngest Azerbaijani billionaire
- Haji Zeynalabdin Taghiyev (1823–1924), industrial oil magnate and philanthropist
- Telman Ismailov (born 1956), Jewish-Azerbaijani businessman.
- Rahman Khalilov (born 1977), Russian and Azerbaijani businessman.

=== Clergy ===
- Ilgar Ibrahimoglu (born 1973), cleric and human rights activist
- Allahshukur Pashazadeh (born 1949), Sheikh ul-Islam and Grand Mufti of the Caucasus
- Movlazadeh Mahammad Hasan Shakavi (1854–1932), religious leader, philosopher, alim, the first Sheikh ul-Islam of the Caucasus, the first scholar who translated Quran into Azerbaijani language
- Sheikh Sardar Hajjihasanli
- Mirza Huseyn Afandi Qayibov (1830–1915), clergyman, literary critic, publicist, enlightener and Mufti of the Caucasus (1884–1917).
- Ahmad Huseinzadeh (1812–1887), third Sheikh ul-Islam of the Caucasus, son of Mahammadali Huseinzadeh, maternal uncle of Ali bey Huseynzade.
- Fazil Iravani (1783–1885), second Sheikh ul-Islam of the Caucasus.
- Mahammadali Huseinzadeh (1760–1852), first shia Sheikh ul-Islam of the Caucasus from 1823 to 1852. Maternal grandfather of Ali bey Huseynzade.

=== Dancers ===
- Gamar Almaszadeh (1915–2006), first Azerbaijani ballerina
- Oksana Rasulova (born 1982), dancer, choreographer and actress
- Leyla Vakilova (1927–1999), ballerina

=== Engineers ===
==== Aerospace ====
- Tofig Ismayilov (1933–1991), aerospace scientist
- Kerim Kerimov (1917–2003), aerospace engineer

=== Fashion ===
- Sona Mehmandarova (born 1894), model
- Badura Afganli (born 1912), fashion designer
- Sophie Couture (born 1990), fashion designer
- Javidan Gurbanova (born 1990), model
- Aysel Manafova (born 1990), model

=== Film industry ===
- Arif Babayev (born 1928–1983), film director
- Yuli Gusman (born 1943), film director
- Robert Hossein (1927–2020), film director and actor
- Magsud Ibrahimbeyov (1935–2016), writer
- Rustam Ibragimbekov (1939–2022), writer and screenwriter
- Elchin Musaoglu (born 1966), film director
- Vagif Mustafayev (born 1953), film director, producer and screenwriter
- Rasim Ojagov (1933–2006), film director and operator
- Hasan Seyidbeyli (1920–1980), film director, dramatist and screenwriter
- Rza Tahmasib (1894–1980), film director and actor

=== Historians ===
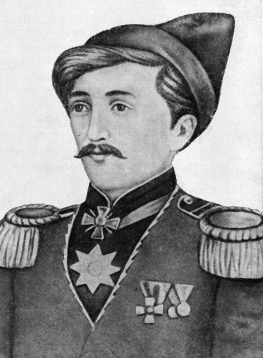
Abbasgulu Bakikhanov is known for founding Azerbaijani scientific historiography.

- Igrar Aliyev (1924–2004), historian
- Sara Ashurbayli (1906–2001), historian, historian and scholar
- Abbasgulu Bakikhanov (1794–1847), writer, historian, journalist, linguist, poet, philosopher and founder of Azerbaijani scientific historiography
- Aydin Balayev (born 1956), historian
- Ziya Buniatov (1923–1997), historian and academician
- Jamil Hasanli (born 1952), historian and politician
- Mirza Jamal Javanshir (1773–1853), historian and politician
- Alexander Kazembek (1802–1870), orientalist, historian and philologist
- Tofig Kocharli (1929–2007), historian and politician
- Farida Mammadova (1936–2021), historian
- Mirza Adigozal bey (1780s–1840), historian of the 19th century, author of a historical work "Garabaghname"

=== Journalists ===
- Hasan bey Aghayev (1875–1920), journalist, doctor, teacher and politician
- Salatyn Asgarova (1961–1991), journalist
- Rena Effendi (born 1977), photographer
- Elmar Huseynov (1967–2005), journalist
- Osman Mirzayev (1937–1991), journalist, writer and publicist
- Ali Mustafayev (1952–1991), journalist
- Chingiz Mustafayev (1960–1992), journalist, National Hero of Azerbaijan.
- Omar Faig Nemanzadeh (1872–1937), journalist

=== Jurists and Lawyers ===
- Aslan bey Safikurdski (1881–1937), lawyer, Minister of Justice of Azerbaijan Democratic Republic.
- Aziz Seyidov (born 1956), lawyer, Justice of the Supreme Court of Azerbaijan.
- Dzhangir Kerimov (1923–2015), legal scholar, member of the Academy of Sciences of the Soviet Union and Professor of Law at the Azerbaijan Academy of Science.
- Farhad Abdullayev (born 1958), lawyer, Chairman of the Constitutional Court of Azerbaijan.
- Ismat Gayibov (1942–1991), lawyer, Public Prosecutor General of Azerbaijan.
- Rustam Khan Khoyski (1888–1939), lawyer, Lieutenant General, Minister of Social Security of Azerbaijan Democratic Republic.
- Latif Huseynov (born 1964), lawyer, Justice of the European Court of Human Rights.

=== Military ===
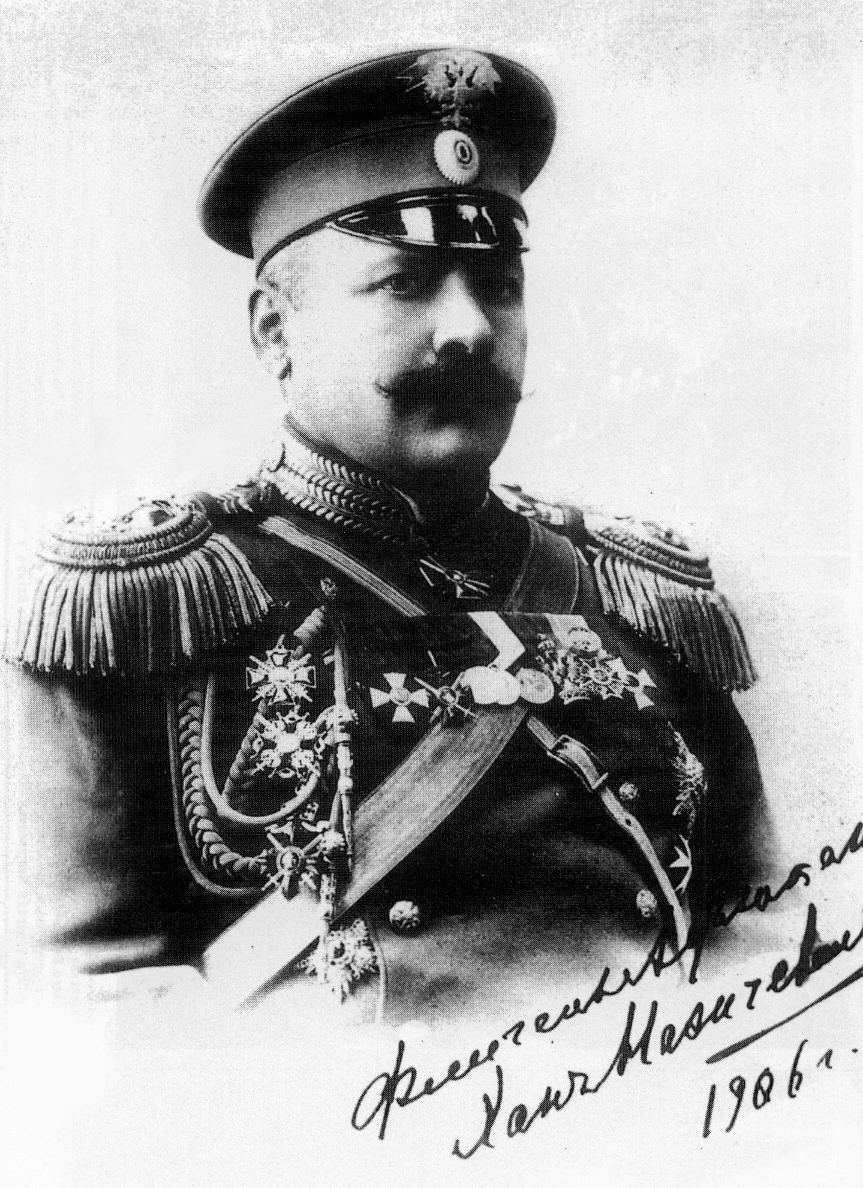
Huseyn Khan Nakhchivanski was General of the Russian Cavalry under the Russian Emperor Nicholas II.

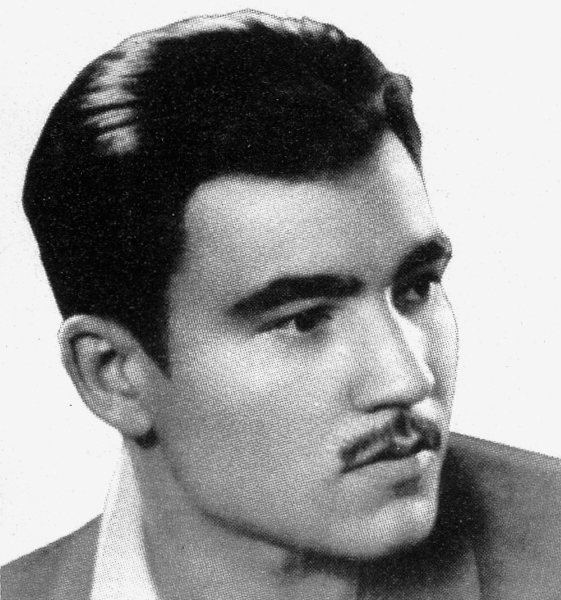
Mehdi Huseynzade was a legendary guerrilla and reconnaissance, made famous daring operations against the German and Italian invaders during the Second World War in Yugoslavia and Italy, Hero of the Soviet Union.

- Feyzullah Mirza Qajar (1872–1920), commander in the Azerbaijani Democratic Republic and Imperial Russian Army
- Mehdigulu Khan Vafa (1855–1900), lieutenant colonel in the Imperial Russian Army
- Jafargulu agha Javanshir (1787–1867), major-general of the Russian Army
- Safar Abiyev (born 1950), army general
- Sona Nuriyeva (1915–1986), aviator
- Albert Agarunov (1969–1992), tank commander
- Sadykh bey Aghabekov (1865–1944), army general in the Russian Imperial Army, founder and reformer of Azerbaijani Police and orientalist
- Riad Ahmadov (1956–1992), military officer
- Avraamy Aslanbegov (1822–1900), vice–admiral and military writer
- Hazi Aslanov (1910–1945), army general
- Allahverdi Baghirov (1946–1992), officer and football coach
- Farrukh Gayibov (1891–1916), first Azerbaijani military pilot during World War I
- Alif Hajiyev (1953–1992), officer
- Zakir Hasanov (born 1959), army general
- Fatulla Huseynov (1937–2004), colonel, politician and public figure
- Tofig Huseynov (1954–1992), major
- Mehdi Huseynzade (1918–1944), guerrilla fighter in Yugoslavia and Italy during World War II
- Mubariz Ibrahimov (1988–2010), warrant officer
- Ahmadiyya Jabrayilov (1920–1994), activist of French Resistance
- Rovshan Javadov (1951–1995), influential military activist, public figure
- Asif Maharramov (1952–1994), lieutenant colonel
- Leyla Mammadbeyova (1909–1989), first Azerbaijani female aviator and the first female pilot in Southern Europe and the Middle East
- Eldar Mammadov (1968–1993), officer
- Israfil Mammadov (1919–1946), military commander
- Samedbey Mehmandarov (1855–1931), army general and politician
- Hussein Khan Nakhichevanski (1855–1931), Cavalry General and General–Adjutant
- Jamshid Nakhichevanski (1863–1919), Russian Imperial, Azerbaijani and Soviet military commander
- Shovkat Salimova (1920–1999), ship captain
- Ali-Agha Shikhlinski (1895–1938), army general and politician
- Ibrahim bey Usubov (1872–1920), military commander
- Polad Hashimov (1975–2020), major general (2019), and National Hero of Azerbaijan
- Anar Aliyev (1980–2020), lieutenant colonel and Hero of the Patriotic War
- Hikmat Mirzayev, lieutenant general of the Azerbaijani Armed Forces and Hero of the Patriotic War.
- Zakir Hasanov, Colonel General, Minister of Defence of Azerbaijan since 2013.
- Ramiz Jafarov (1974–2020), lieutenant colonel and Hero of the Patriotic War
- Tehran Mansimov, colonel and senior leader in the Special Forces.

=== Musicians ===
==== Composers ====
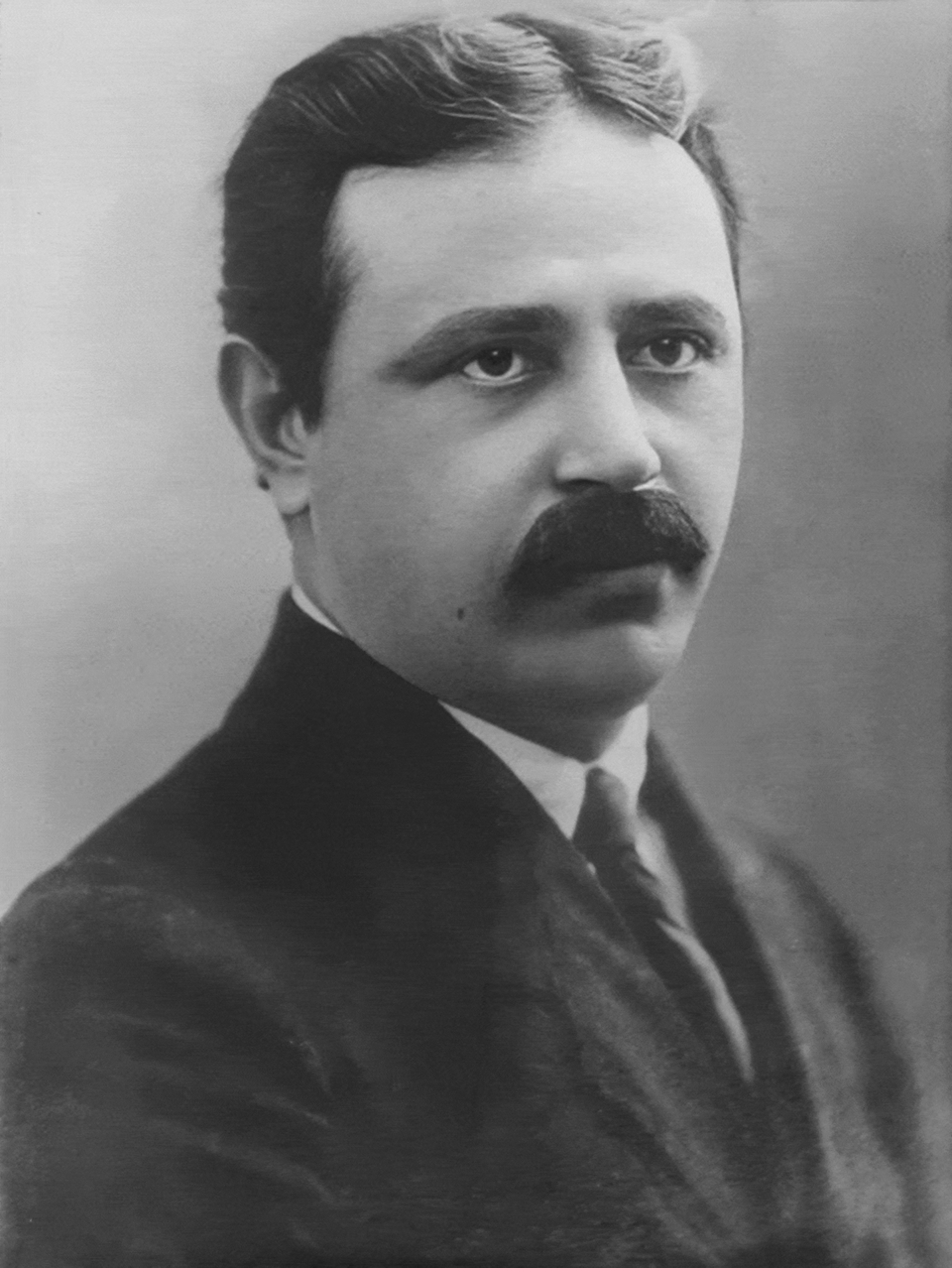
Uzeyir Hajibeyov is recognized as the father of Azerbaijani classical music and opera. He composed the national anthem of Azerbaijan.

- Franghiz Ali-Zadeh (born 1947), composer
- Fikret Amirov (1922–1984), composer
- Rafig Babayev (1937–1994), composer, jazz pianist and singer
- Afrasiyab Badalbeyli (1907–1976), composer, conductor and music critic; the author of music and the libretto of the first Azerbaijani Ballet and the first ballet in the Muslim East
- Tofig Bakikhanov (1930–2026), violinist, composer and academic teacher
- Amina Figarova (born 1964), jazz composer and pianist
- Salman Gambarov (born 1959), composer and jazz pianist
- Gara Garayev (1918–1982), composer
- Tofig Guliyev (1917–2000), composer
- Soltan Hajibeyov (1919–1974), composer
- Uzeyir Hajibeyov (1885–1948), composer, conductor, scientist, publicist, playwright, teacher, translator, and social figure; the first Muslim author of an opera
- Rauf Hajiyev (1922–1985), composer and politician
- Muslim Magomayev (1885–1937), composer, one of the founders of Azerbaijani classical music
- Arif Malikov (1933–2019), composer
- Eldar Mansurov (born 1952), composer
- Vagif Mustafazadeh (1940–1979), composer and jazz pianist and the founder of Azerbaijani jazz
- Emin Sabitoglu (1937–2000), composer, music editor
- Ali Salimi (1922–1997), composer and tar player
- Alakbar Taghiyev (1922–1981), composer
- Aziza Mustafa Zadeh (born 1969), singer, composer, pianist

==== Singers ====
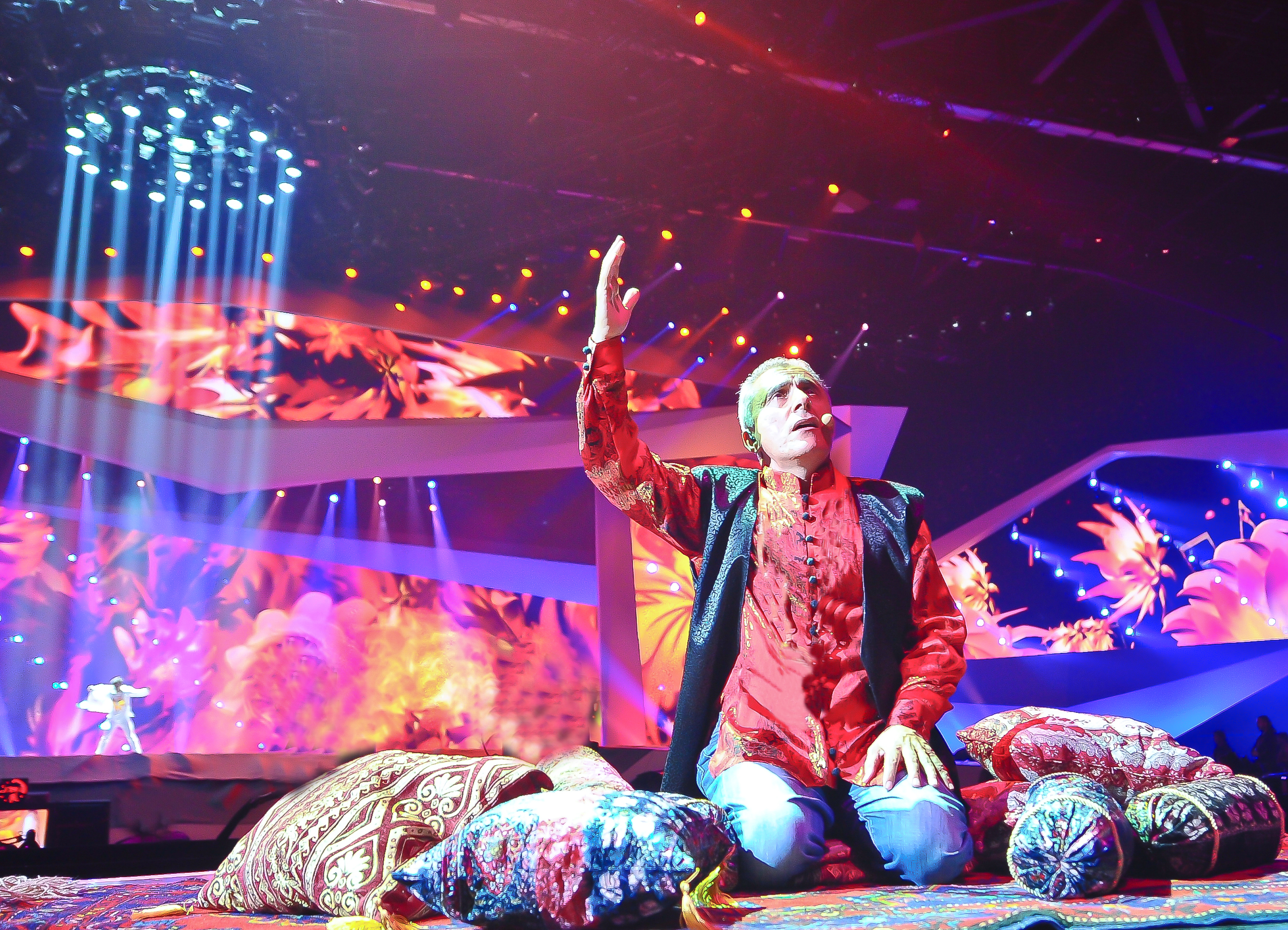
Alim Qasimov is the winner of the International Music Council's UNESCO Music Prize, one of the highest international accolades for music.

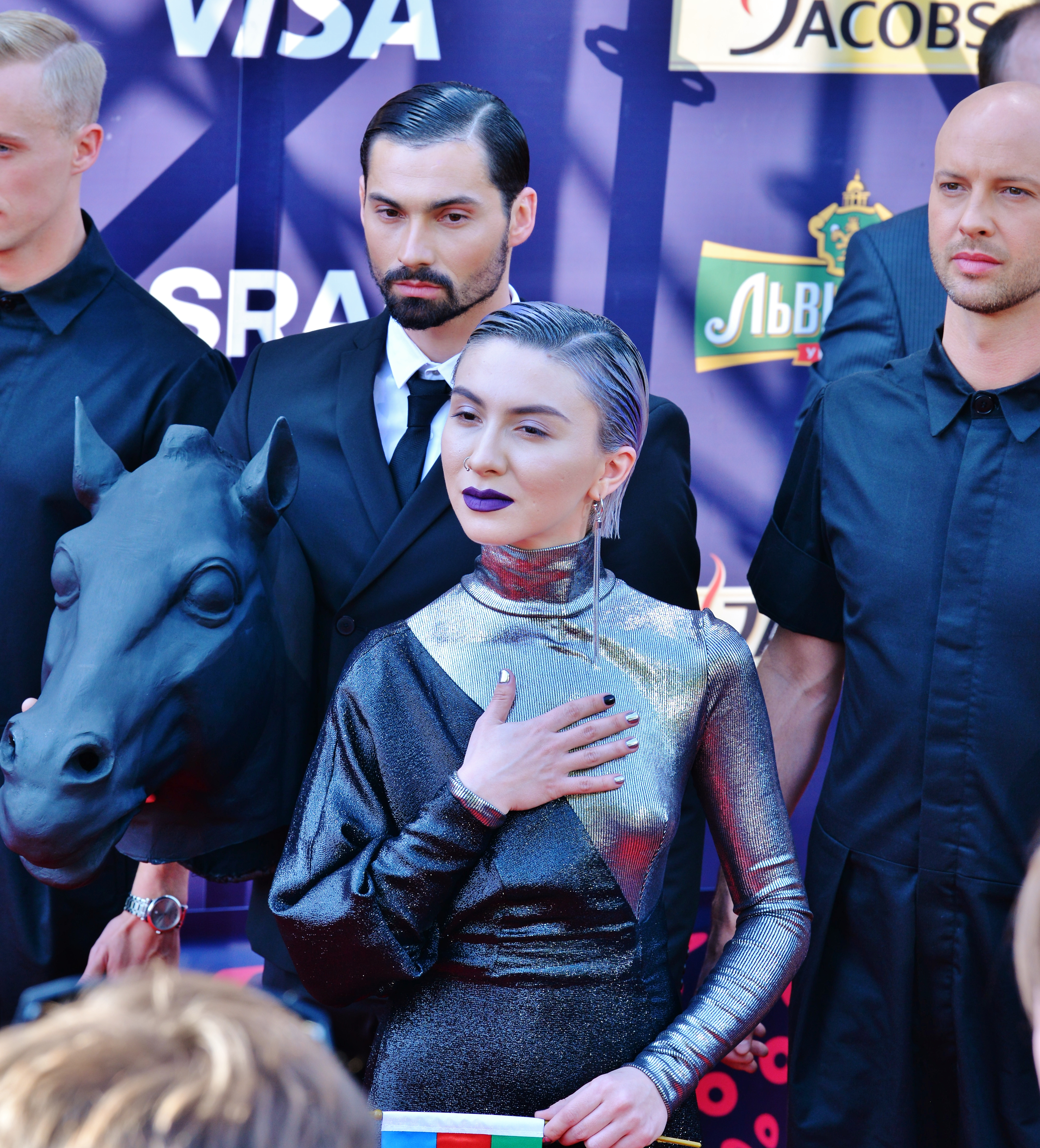
Diana Hajiyeva, Azerbaijan's representative in 2017 Eurovision Song Contest.

- Safi al-Din al-Urmawi (1216–1294), musician and writer on the theory of music
- Aghakhan Abdullayev (born 1950), mugham singer
- Emin Agalarov (born 1979), singer
- Fatma Mukhtarova (1893–1972), opera singer (mezzo-soprano), Honorary Artist of Georgia, and People's Artist of Azerbaijan
- Ahmed Agdamski (1884–1954), folk and opera singer
- Ogtay Aghayev (1935–2006), singer
- Franghiz Ahmadova (1928–2011), opera singer
- Shovkat Alakbarova (1922–1993), singer
- Sevda Alakbarzadeh (born 1977), jazz singer
- Dinara Aliyeva (born 1980), singer (soprano)
- Safura Alizadeh (born 1992), singer
- Rauf Atakishiyev (1925–1994), singer, pianist, singer–soloist and scholar
- Mashadibaba Aydamirov (1971–2011), meykhana performer
- Elchin Azizov (born 1975), opera singer and entertainer
- Rashid Behbudov (1915–1989), singer, actor
- Bulbul (1897–1961), folk and opera singer and one of the founders of Azerbaijani national musical theater
- Bulbuljan (1841–1927), mugham singer
- Polad Bulbuloglu (born 1945), singer-songwriter and actor
- Aghasalim Childagh (1930–2008), meykhana performer
- Brilliant Dadashova (born 1965), singer
- Rashad Daghly (born 1984), meykhana performer
- Huseyn Derya (1975–2014), rapper
- Jabbar Garyagdyoglu (1861–1944), mugham singer
- Eldar Gasimov (born 1989), singer and actor
- Fidan Gasimova (born 1947), opera singer
- Fidan Haciyeva (born 1976), opera singer
- Khuraman Gasimova (born 1951), opera singer
- Gulkhar Hasanova (1918–2005), opera singer
- Hajibaba Huseynov (1919–1993), mugham singer
- Mansum Ibrahimov (born 1960), mugham singer
- Lutfiyar Imanov (1928–2008), opera singer
- Akif Islamzade (born 1948), pop singer
- Flora Karimova (born 1941), pop music singer, civil rights activist, and People's Artist of Azerbaijan.
- Aygün Kazımova (born 1971), pop singer, actress
- Dilara Kazimova (born 1984), singer and actress
- Zeynab Khanlarova (born 1936), singer and politician
- Muslim Magomayev (1942–2008), opera, pop singer and composer
- Sakhavat Mammadov (1953–1991), folk and mugham singer
- Yagub Mammadov (1930–2002), mugham singer
- Nazakat Mammadova (1944–1981), folk and mugham singer
- Anar Nagilbaz (born 1974), rapper, actor
- Alim Qasimov (born 1957), mugham singer
- Farghana Qasimova (born 1979), mugham singer
- Nizami Ramzi (1947–1997), meykhana performer
- Gadir Rustamov (1935–2011), mugham singer
- Huseyngulu Sarabski (1879–1945), opera singer, composer, playwright, actor, producer and musician
- Adalet Shukurov (born 1966), singer
- Khan Shushinski (1901–1979), mugham singer
- Seyid Shushinski (1889–1965), mugham singer
- Aysel Teymurzadeh (born 1989), singer
- Elshad Xose (born 1979), rapper
- Eyyub Yaqubov (born 1965), singer
- Miri Yusif (born 1977), rapper and singer
- Sami Yusuf (born 1980)‚ singer-songwriter
- Aziza Mustafa Zadeh (born 1969), jazz singer and pianist
- Diana Hajiyeva (born 1989), singer-songwriter
- Namig Garachukhurlu (born 1978), singer-songwriter, meykhana, performer

==== Instrumental musicians ====
- Habil Aliyev (1927–2015), kamancha player
- Farhad Badalbeyli (born 1947), pianist and composer
- Kamil Jalilov (1938–2022), oboe player
- Bahram Mansurov (1911–1985), tar player
- Shahin Novrasli (born 1977), jazz pianist
- Gurban Pirimov (1880–1965), tar player
- Sadigjan (1846–1902), tar player and the inventor of the Azerbaijani tar
- Alihan Samedov (born 1964), balaban player
- Isfar Sarabski (born 1989), jazz pianist
- Rain Sultanov (born 1965), saxophonist
- Shahriyar Imanov (born 1989), virtuosi tar player

=== Philosophers ===
- Seyid Yahya Bakuvi (1410–1462), philosopher
- Max Black (1909–1988), philosopher
- Salahaddin Khalilov (born 1952), philosopher
- Adil Asadov (born 1958), philosopher
- Zaid Orudzhev (born 1932), philosopher
- Heydar Huseynov (1908–1950), philosopher and academician

=== Politicians ===
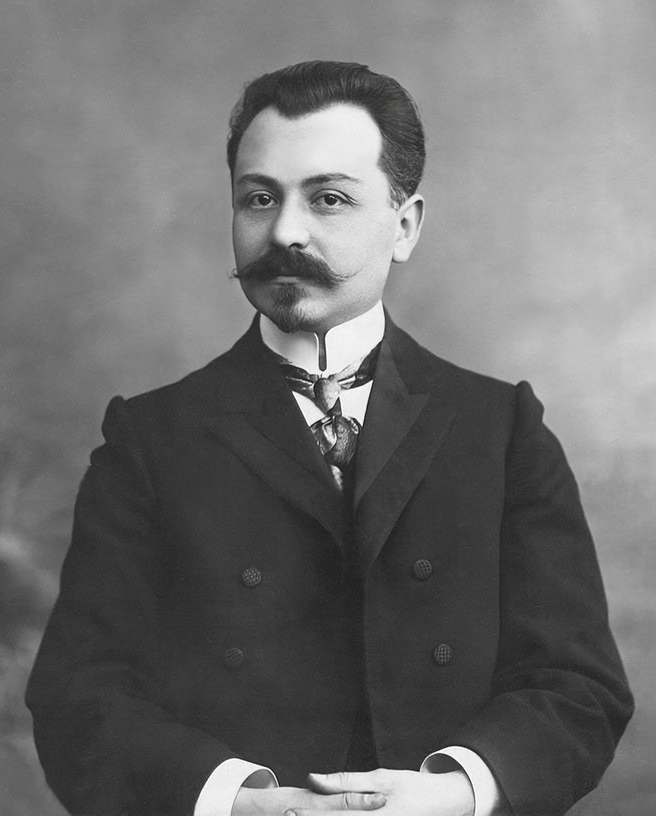
Fatali Khan Khoyski was the first Prime Minister of the independent Azerbaijan Democratic Republic.

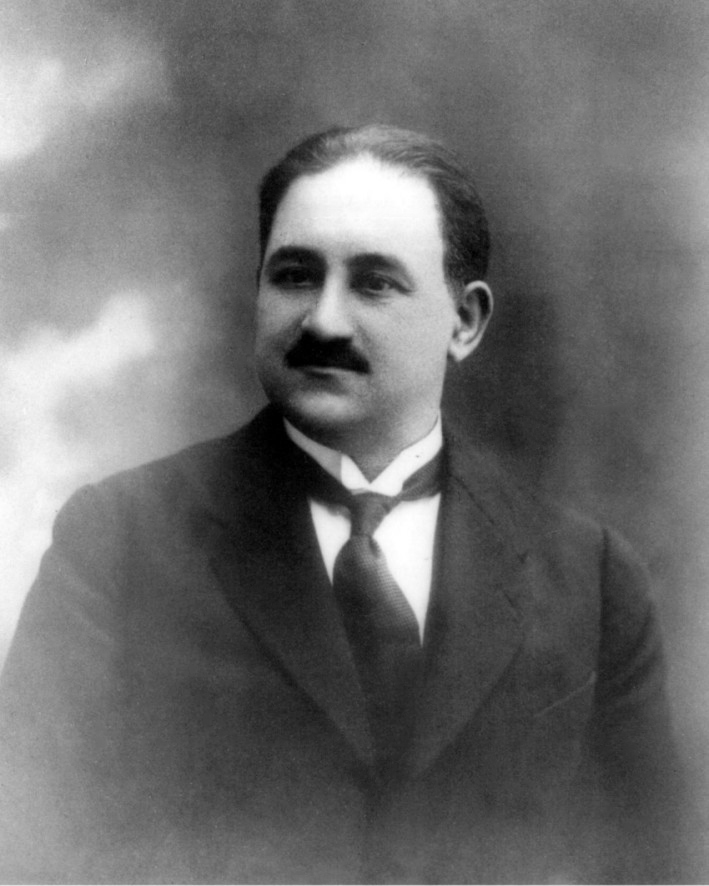
Mammad Amin Rasulzade was the only president of the Azerbaijan Democratic Republic.

- Sultan Majid Afandiyev (1887–1938), politician and revolutionary
- Samad aga Agamalioglu (1867–1930), politician and revolutionary
- Ahmet Ağaoğlu (1869–1939), politician, publicist and journalist
- Ruhulla Akhundov (1897–1938), First Secretary of the Communist Party of Azerbaijan SSR
- Vali Akhundov (1916–1986), First Secretary of the Communist Party of Azerbaijan SSR
- Heydar Aliyev (1923–2003), First Secretary of the Communist Party of Azerbaijan SSR and President of Azerbaijan
- Ilham Aliyev (born 1961), President of Azerbaijan
- Mehriban Aliyeva (born 1964), politician and UNESCO Goodwill Ambassador
- Elnur M. Allahverdiyev (born 1978), entrepreneur and politician who is a Member of the National Assembly of Azerbaijan (VI convocation).
- Mahammad Asadov (1941–1991), politician
- Araz Azimov (born 1962), politician
- Kamran Baghirov (1933–2000), First Secretary of the Communist Party of Azerbaijan SSR
- Mir Jafar Baghirov (1896–1956), First Secretary of the Communist Party of Azerbaijan SSR
- Elmir Bagirov (born 1980), politician
- Govhar Bakhshaliyeva (born 1954), Vice Speaker of the Milli Majlis
- Abulfaz Elchibey (1938–2000), President of Azerbaijan
- Aslan bey Gardashov (1866–1920), politician
- Rasul Guliyev (born 1947), politician
- Vafa Guluzade (1940–2015), diplomat, political scientist and specialist in conflict resolution
- Kamaladdin Heydarov (born 1961), politician and composer
- Alisahib Huseynov (born 1970), politician
- Mirza Davud Huseynov (1894–1938), Chairman of the Presidium of the Communist Party of Azerbaijan SSR and First Secretary of the Communist Party of the Tajik SSR
- Tofig Ismayilov (1933–1991), politician
- Mammad Yusif Jafarov (1885–1938), politician
- Ali Karimli (born 1965), politician
- Khalil Khasmammadov (1875–1947), politician and diplomat
- Fatali Khan Khoyski (1875–1920), politician, attorney, and one of the founding leaders of Azerbaijan Democratic Republic.
- Anar Mammadkhanov (1970–2011), politician and social activist
- Gurban Mammadov (born 1959), politician and legal expert
- Ziya Mammadov (born 1952), politician
- Elmar Mammadyarov (born 1960), politician
- Asya Manafova (born 1941), politician
- Rasim Musabayov (born 1951), politician, political scientist and specialist in conflict resolution
- Gazanfar Musabekov (1888–1938), politician
- Imam Mustafayev (1910–1997), First Secretary of the Communist Party of Azerbaijan SSR
- Ayaz Mutalibov (1938–2022), First Secretary of the Communist Party of Azerbaijan SSR and the first President of Azerbaijan
- Eldar Namazov (born 1956), politician
- Sabit Orujov (1912–1981), politician
- Ganira Pashayeva (born 1975), politician, public activist, journalist and poet
- Mammed Amin Rasulzade (1884–1955), statesman, scholar, public figure and one of the founding leaders of Azerbaijan Democratic Republic
- Khosrov bey Sultanov (1879–1947), politician
- Ramil Usubov (born 1948), politician
- Abdurrahman Vazirov (1930–2022), First Secretary of the Communist Party of Azerbaijan SSR
- Mir Teymur Yaqubov (1904–1970), First Secretary of the Communist Party of Azerbaijan SSR
- Nasib Yusifbeyli (1881–1920), publicist, statesman and one of the founding leaders of Azerbaijan Democratic Republic
- Sinan Oğan (born 1967), Turkish politician

=== Political activists and leaders of rebellions ===
- Meshadi Azizbekov (1876–1918), revolutionary, of the 26 Baku Commissars and one of the first Azeri–Marxists
- Shahla Ismail (1976 - ) Human rights activist
- Khanlar Safaraliyev (1878–1907), oil field worker, trade unionist and revolutionary social democrat
- Mir Hasan Vazirov (1889–1918), socialist–revolutionary, of the 26 Baku Commissars

=== Scientists and mathematicians ===
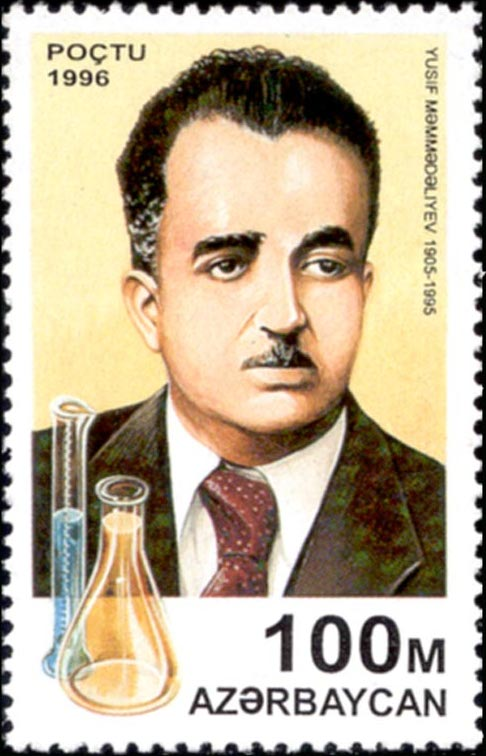
Stamp dedicated to the 90th anniversary of chemist Yusif Mammadaliyev

- Hasan Abdullayev (1918–1993), physicist, scientist and public official, President of the National Academy of Sciences of the Azerbaijan SSR.
- Rasim Alguliyev (born 1958), doctor of technical sciences, active member of Azerbaijan National Academy of Sciences
- Aminaga Sadigov (born 1962), doctor of technical sciences, professor, the head of the Office of Science and Education of the Presidium of ANAS
- Ahliman Amiraslanov (born 1947), oncologist, professor and Rector of Azerbaijan Medical University
- Hamid Arasly (1902–1983), literary critic
- Firuddin Babayev (1929–1987), pathologist
- Anvar Chingizoglu (born 1962), historian, ethnologist and genealogist
- Jeyhun Hajibeyli (1891–1962), ethnographer
- Alemdar Hasanoğlu (born 1954), mathematician
- Ashraf Huseynov (1907–1981), mathematician, member of Azerbaijan National Academy of Sciences
- Nadir Ibrahimov (1932–1977), astronomer
- Hamlet Isakhanli (born 1948), mathematician and poet, founder and president of Khazar University
- Ishag Jafarzadeh (1895–1982), one of the pioneers of Azerbaijan archaeology and ethnography
- Kerim Kerimov (1917–2003), rocket scientist, one of the founders of the Soviet space industry, and for many years a central figure in the Soviet space program
- Yusif Kerimov (1926–1997), electrical engineer, inventor and former head of the Azerenergy
- Firudin bey Kocharli (1863–1920), philologist, writer and literary critic
- Yusif Mammadaliyev (1905–1961), chemist, was the president of the National Academy of Sciences of the Azerbaijan SSR
- Leyla Mammadbeyova (1922–2006), first female Azerbaijani pathologist and the first female forensic medical expert
- Faig Mammadov (1929–1987) agronomist
- Tamilla Nasirova (1936–2023), mathematician
- Zaid Orudzhev (born 1932), philosopher
- Mirali Qashqai (1907–1977), geologist
- Majid Rasulov (1916 –1993), mathematician
- Arif Salimov (born 1956), mathematician
- Farman Salmanov (1931–2007), geologist
- Ilham Shahmuradov (born 1958), geneticist
- Agabey Sultanov (1938–2007), psychiatrist, scholar and public activist
- Hajibey Sultanov (1921–2008), astronomer and former head of the Shamakhi Astrophysical Observatory
- Lotfi A. Zadeh (1921–2017), mathematician, electrical engineer, computer scientist, founder of the theory of fuzzy sets and fuzzy logic
- Marif Zeynalov (1934–2020), candidate of geology and mineralogy
- Anvar Gasimzade (1912–1969), architect, Honored Architect of the Azerbaijan SSR (1960), correspondent member of ANAS (1967), rector of Azerbaijan State Oil and Industry University (1962–1968).
- Aghakhan Aghabeyli (1904–1980), Azerbaijani scientist in the field of genetics and animal breeding, doctor of agricultural sciences, professor, corresponding member of the VASKhNIL (now RAAS – Russian Academy of Agricultural Sciences), honored worker of science of the Azerbaijan SSR. The founder of the doctrine of buffalo breeding.
- Lutfiyar Imanov (1922–1980), physicist, full member of the Azerbaijan Academy of Sciences (1976), pedagogue, Honored Scientist of the Azerbaijan SSR (1979).

=== Sports ===
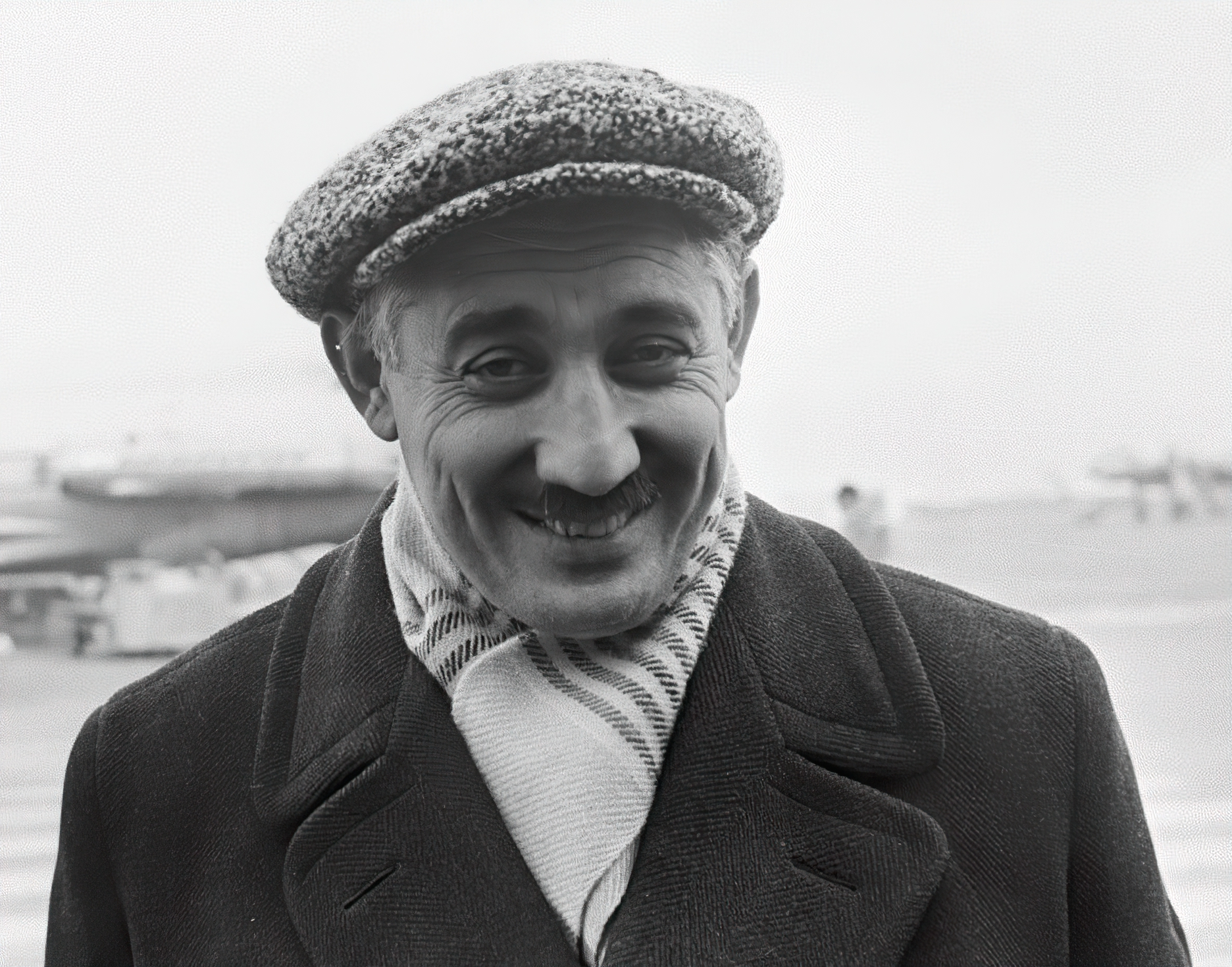
Tofiq Bahramov became the first referee to have a stadium named after him.

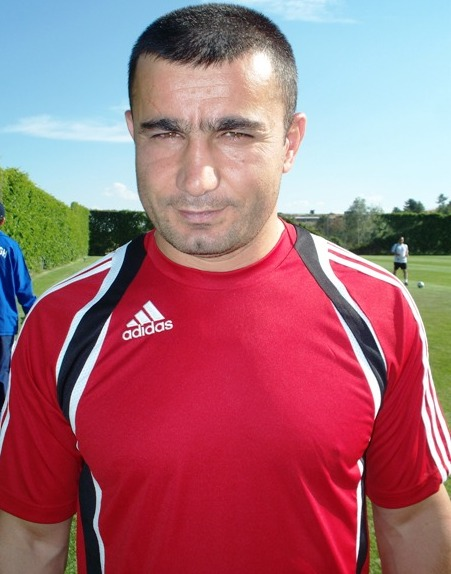
Gurban Gurbanov is Azerbaijan's all-time leading goal scorer in international matches and most successful manager in European cups.

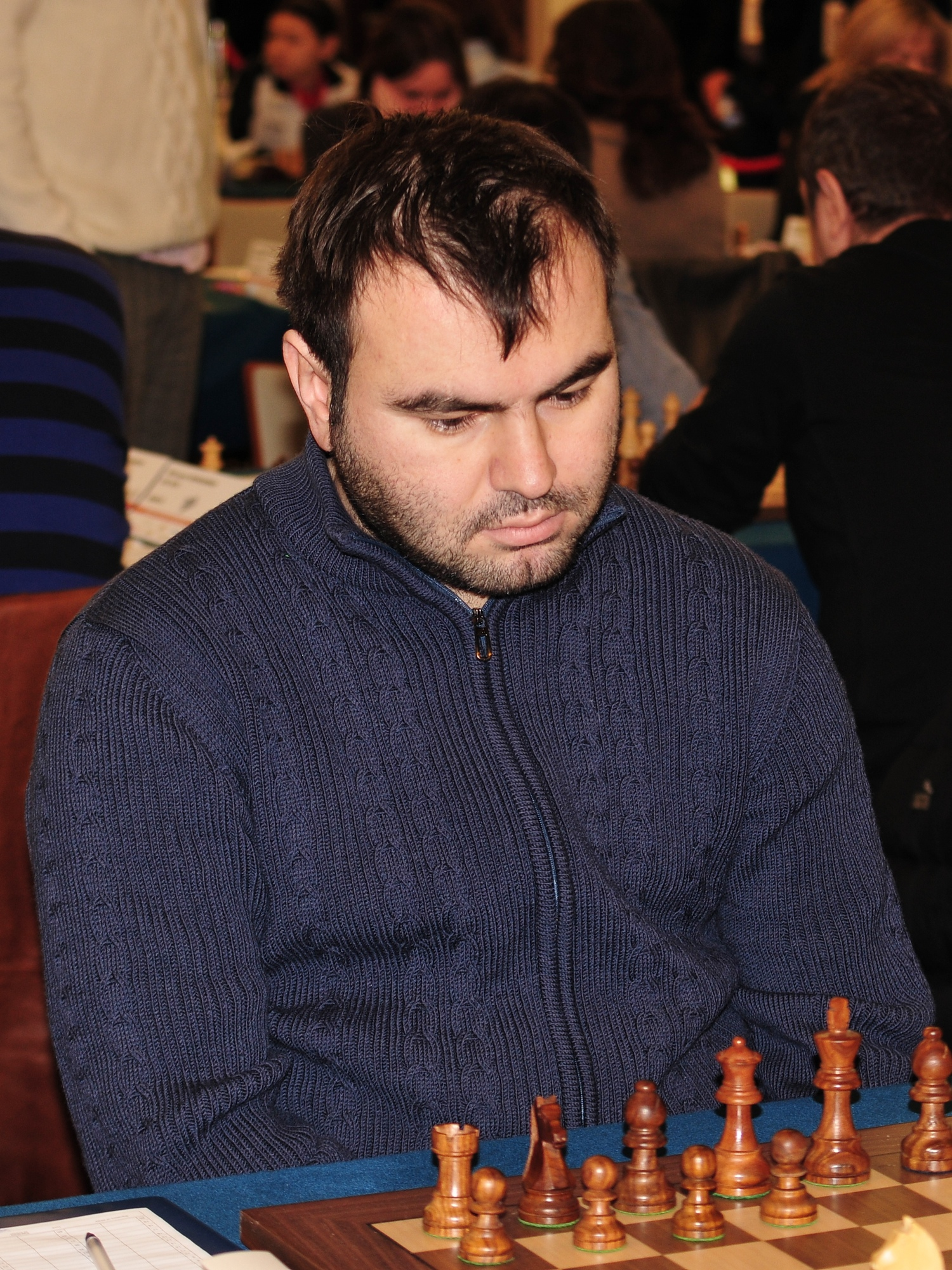
Shakhriyar Mamedyarov is the 2013 World Rapid Chess Champion.

- Asgar Abdullayev (born 1960), footballer and football manager
- Namig Abdullayev (born 1971), wrestler and Olympic champion
- Parviz Abdullayev (born 1986), professional kickboxer
- Ruslan Abishov (born 1987), footballer
- Emin Aghayev (born 1973), footballer and football manager
- Kamran Aghayev (born 1986), footballer
- Rafael Aghayev (born 1985), karateka
- Emin Ahmadov (born 1986), wrestler
- Mashalla Ahmadov (born 1959), footballer
- Samir Alakbarov (born 1968), footballer
- Vugar Alakbarov (born 1981), boxer
- Ahmad Alasgarov (1935–2015), footballer and football manager
- Tofig Aliyev (born 2004), athlete who competes in trampoline gymnastics
- Rauf Aliyev (born 1989), footballer
- Arif Asadov (born 1970), footballer and football manager
- Toghrul Asgarov (born 1992), wrestler and Olympic champion
- Irada Ashumova (born 1958), sports shooter
- Israfil Ashurly (born 1969), mountaineer
- Murad Ashurly (1973–2014), mountaineer
- Fuad Aslanov (born 1976), boxer
- Orhan Aydın (born 1989), basketballer
- Tofiq Bahramov (1925–1993), Azerbaijani linesman from 1966 World Cup final
- Rasim Başak (born 1980), basketball player
- Rovshan Bayramov (born 1987), wrestler
- Faig Garayev (born 1959), volleyball player and volleyball coach
- Vugar Gashimov (1986–2014), chess grandmaster
- Vali Gasimov (born 1968), footballer and football manager
- Natavan Gasimova (born 1985), volleyball player
- Ramil Guliyev (born 1990), sprinter
- Gurban Gurbanov (born 1972), footballer and football manager
- Mahmud Gurbanov (born 1973), footballer and football manager
- Boyukagha Hajiyev (born 1958), footballer and football manager
- Faiq Hasanov (born 1940), chess arbiter, coach and TV presenter
- Nazim Huseynov (born 1969), judoka and Olympic champion
- Yunis Huseynov (born 1965), footballer and football manager
- Ramin Ibrahimov (born 1978), judoka
- Shahin Imranov (born 1980), boxer
- Elchin Ismayilov (born 1982), judoka
- Isgandar Javadov (born 1956), footballer
- Vagif Javadov (born 1989), footballer
- Aygün Kazımova (born 1971), handball
- Sergey Kramarenko (1946–2008), footballer and football manager
- Rauf Mamedov (born 1988), chess grandmaster
- Shakhriyar Mamedyarov (born 1985), chess grandmaster
- Elnur Mammadli (born 1988), judoka and Olympic champion
- Aghasi Mammadov (born 1980), boxer
- Alakbar Mammadov (1925–2014), footballer
- Elkhan Mammadov (born 1982), judoka
- Fariz Mammadov (born 1980), boxer
- Ramiz Mammadov (born 1968), footballer and football manager
- Teymur Mammadov (born 1993), boxer
- Zemfira Meftahatdinova (born 1963), sport shooter and Olympic champion
- Aghasalim Mirjavadov (born 1947), footballer and football manager
- Rami Miron (born 1957), Israeli Olympic wrestler
- Olokhan Musayev (born 1979), athlete
- Oleg Panyutin (born 1983), athlete
- Nizami Pashayev (born 1981), weightlifter
- Zhala Piriyeva (born 2000), rhythmic gymnast
- Natali Pronina (born 1987), swimmer
- Teimour Radjabov (born 1987), chess grandmaster
- Jamal Rahimov (born 1987), equestrian
- Vidadi Rzayev (born 1967), footballer and football manager
- Rashad Sadygov (born 1982), footballer
- Vagif Sadygov (born 1959), footballer and football manager
- Seljan Mahsudova (born 2003), Azerbaijani trampoline gymnast
- Maqsud Mahsudov (born 2007), Azerbaijani trampoline gymnast
- Sharif Sharifov (born 1988), wrestler and Olympic champion
- Samadagha Shikhlarov (1959–2021), footballer and football manager
- Mahir Shukurov (born 1982), footballer
- Nazim Suleymanov (born 1965), footballer and football manager
- Jeyhun Sultanov (born 1979), footballer
- Afag Sultanova (born 1987), judoka
- Zaur Tagizade (born 1979), footballer
- Kazbek Tuaev (born 1940), footballer and football manager
- Lala Yusifova (born 1996), rhythmic gymnast
- Ilham Zakiyev (born 1980), judoka

=== Writers ===
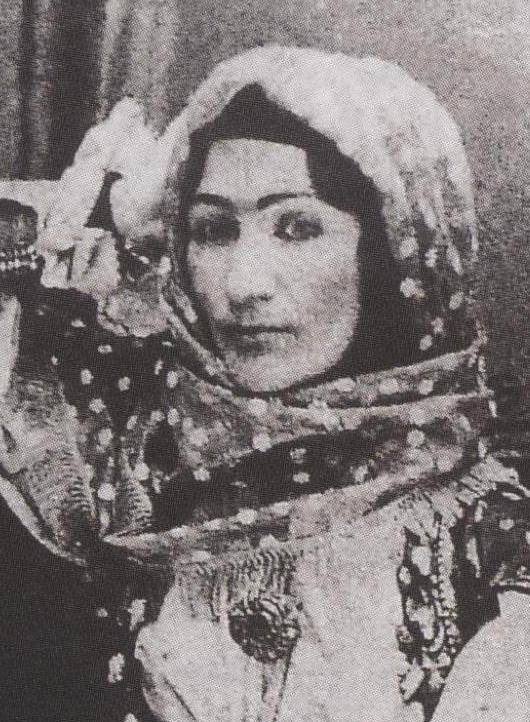
Khurshidbanu Natavan was the daughter of Mehdi Gulu–khan, the last ruler of the Karabakh khanate (1748–1822); she is considered one of the best lyrical poets of Azerbaijan.

- Chingiz Abdullayev (born 1959), best–selling detective writer
- Elchin Afandiyev (born 1943), writer and politician
- Ilyas Afandiyev (1914–1996), writer
- Mirza Fatali Akhundov (1812–1878), writer, educator, philosopher; founder of Azerbaijani drama
- Suleyman Sani Akhundov (1875–1939), playwright, journalist, children's author and teacher
- Sakina Akhundzadeh (1865–1927), first female playwright and dramatist of Azerbaijani literature
- Mammad Araz (1933–2004), poet
- Vidadi Babanli (born 1927), writer, dramatist and translator
- Banine (1905–1992), writer
- Yusif Vazir Chamanzaminli (1887–1943), writer
- Mirvarid Dilbazi (1912–2001), poet
- Fikrat Goja (1935–2021), poet
- Madina Gulgun (1926–1991), poet
- Shikhali Gurbanov (1925–1967), writer
- Mahammad Hadi (1879–1920), poet
- Abdurrahim bey Hagverdiyev (1870–1930), playwright, stage director, politician and public figure
- Mehdi Huseyn (1909–1965), writer
- Ali bey Huseynzade (1864–1940), writer, philosopher, doctor and the creator of the modern flag of Azerbaijan
- Almas Ildyrym (1907–1952), poet
- Hamlet Isakhanli (born 1948), poet, writer, mathematician, historian of science, philosophy and culture and educator
- Jafar Jabbarly (1899–1934), writer
- Ahmad Javad (1892–1937), poet and best known for composing Azerbaijan's national anthem
- Jafargulu agha Javanshir (1787–1866), poet and major–general
- Huseyn Javid (1882–1941), poet and playwright, founder of the progressive romanticism in Azerbaijani literature
- Nusrat Kasamanli (1946–2003), poet
- Heyran Khanim (1790–1848), poet
- Jalil Mammadguluzadeh (1866–1932), satirist and writer
- Afag Masud (born 1957), writer
- Mikayil Mushfig (1908–1939), poet
- Khurshidbanu Natavan (1832–1897), poet
- Kamran Nazirli (born 1958), writer, translator and dramatist
- Mammed Said Ordubadi (1872–1950), writer
- Baba Punhan (1948–2004), poet
- Nigar Rafibeyli (1913–1981), writer
- Natig Rasulzadeh (born 1949), writer
- Suleyman Rustam (1906–1989), poet
- Rasul Rza (1910–1981), writer
- Anar Rzayev (born 1938), writer, dramatist and film director
- Mirza Alakbar Sabir (1862–1911), poet
- Elchin Safarli (born 1984), novelist and journalist
- Abbas Sahhat (1874–1918), poet and dramatist
- Bahar Shirvani (1835–1883), poet
- Seyid Azim Shirvani (1835–1888), poet
- Ismayil Shykhly (1919–1995), writer
- Manaf Suleymanov (1912–2001), writer, translator and historian
- Khalil Rza Uluturk (1932–1994), poet
- Mehdigulu Khan Vafa (1855–1900), poet and lieutenant colonel
- Molla Panah Vagif (1717–1797), poet and vizier Karabakh Khanate and the founder of realism in Azerbaijani literature
- Bakhtiyar Vahabzadeh (1925–2009), poet
- Aliagha Vahid (1895–1965), poet
- Mirza Shafi Vazeh (1794–1852), poet
- Hashim bey Vazirov (1868–1916), writer, journalist and publisher
- Najaf bey Vazirov (1854–1925), novelist, playwright, theatrical figure and one of the founders of Azerbaijani theater
- Molla Vali Vidadi (1708–1809), poet
- Samad Vurgun (1906–1956), poet
- Gasim bey Zakir (1784–1857), poet
- Habibi (born 1470), poet
- Mirza Ali Khan La'li (1845–1907), writer, physician

=== Other notables ===
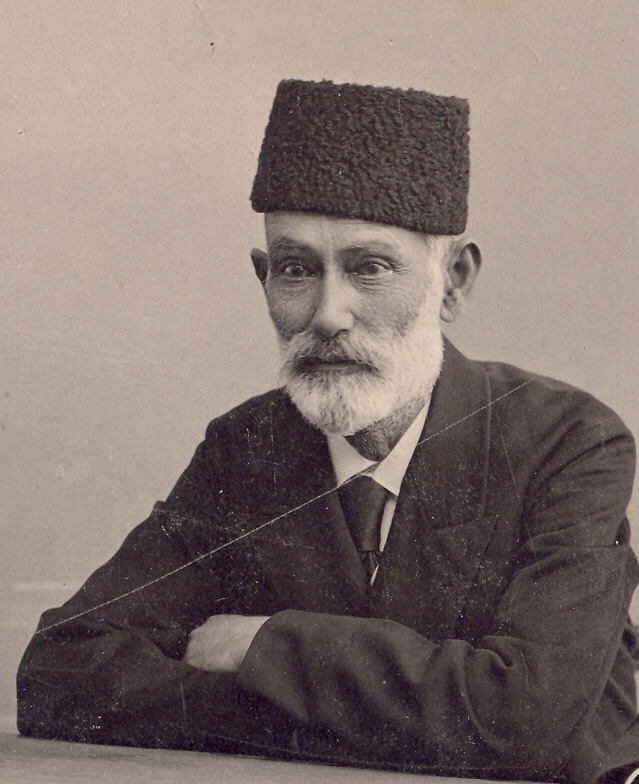
Hasan bey Zardabi was the founder of the first Azerbaijani–language newspaper, Akinchi

- Rovshan Aliyev (1955–2002), criminalist
- Rahilya Geybullayeva (born 1961), literary researcher
- Enver Mamedov (1923–2023), mass media manager
- Shirali Muslimov (1805–1973), supercentarian
- Hasan bey Zardabi (1837–1907), publicist and scholar
- Hamida Javanshir (1873–1955), Azerbaijani philanthropist and women's rights activist

== Iran ==
=== Actors ===
- Behrouz Vossoughi (born 1938), actor
- Mohammad Reza Golzar (born 1977), actor and singer
- Rambod Javan (born 1971), actor

=== Artists ===
- Aydin Aghdashloo (born 1940), painter
- Haydar Hatemi (born 1945), painter

=== Businessmen ===
- Hassan Khosrowshahi (born 1940), businessman and philanthropist
- Reza Zarrab (born 1984), businessman

=== Clergy ===
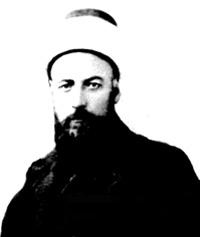
Haji-Mirza Hassan Roshdieh which introduced some modern teaching methods in Iran.

- Haji-Mirza Hassan Roshdieh (born 1851), cleric, teacher, politician, and journalist. introduced some modern teaching methods in Iran, especially in teaching the alphabet.
- Mohammad-Taqi Ja'fari Islamic scholar and philosopher
- Muhammad Husayn Tabatabaei, Islamic scholar and philosopher
- Javad Gharavi Aliari (1935–2018), Twelver shi'a marja
- Abdolkarim Mousavi Ardabili (1926–2016), politician and Twelver shi'a marja
- Sadegh Khalkhali (1926–2003), hardline Shia cleric of the Islamic Republic
- Abul-Qassim Khoei (1899–1992), Twelver shi'a marja
- Fazel Lankarani (1931–2007), Twelver shi'a marja
- Ali Meshkini (1922–2007), cleric and politician
- Hassan Roshdieh (1851–1944), cleric and politician
- Mohammad Kazem Shariatmadari (1905–1986), Grand Ayatollah
- Allameh Tabatabaei (1903–1981), philosopher
- Abbas-Ali Amid Zanjani (1937–2011), hardliner theologian, politician and scholar
- Mousa Shubairi Zanjani (born 1928), Twelver shi'a marja

=== Filmmakers ===
- Jafar Panahi (born 1960), filmmaker

=== Journalists ===
- Reza Deghati (born 1952), photojournalist

=== Military ===
- Mehdi Bakeri (1954–1985), mayor during Iran–Iraq War
- Javad Fakori (1939–1981), army general and politician
- Abbas Gharabaghi (1918–2000), politician, military leader of Iran and the first Iranian to successfully pilot an aircraft
- Habibullah Huseynov (1910–1945), Soviet colonel and Hero of the Soviet Union
- Mohammad Taqi–Khan Pessian (1892–1921), military leader
- Yahya Rahim Safavi (born 1958), Major General, Chief commander of IRGC (1997–2007)
- Mohammad Bagheri (1960/1961–2025), Major General, Chief of the General Staff of the Armed Forces of the Islamic Republic of Iran (2016–2025)

=== Musicians ===
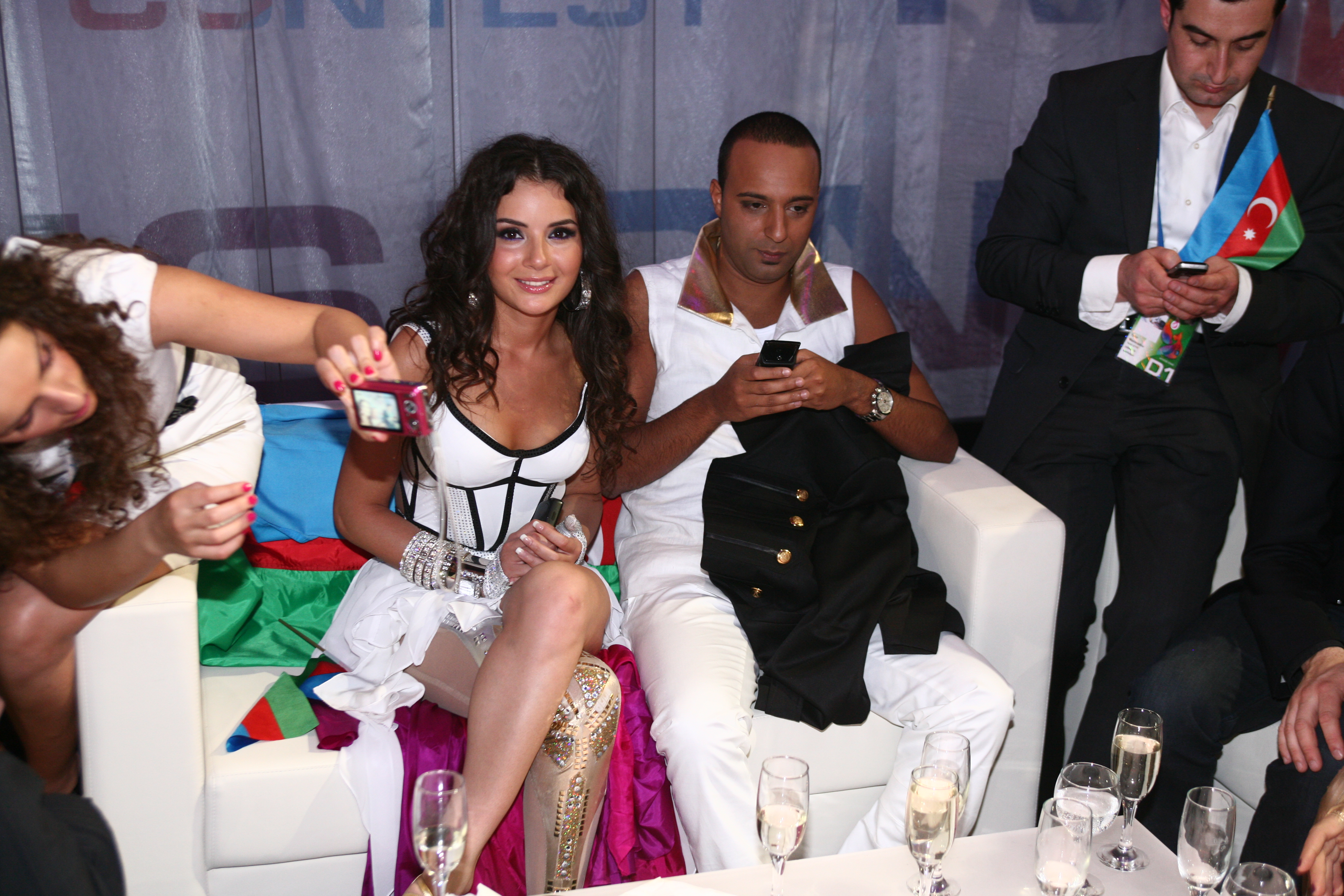
Aysel and Arash in the green room during the 2009 Eurovision Song Contest in Moscow

- Hossein Alizadeh (born 1951), classical composer and folk musician
- Arash (born 1977), singer, dancer, entertainer and producer
- Aref Arefkia (born 1941), singer
- Faegheh Atashin (born 1960), singer and actress
- Davod Azad (born 1963), composer, Sufi vocalist and multi–instrumentalist
- Samin Baghtcheban (1925–2008), musician, composer, author and translator
- Dariush Eghbali (born 1951), pop singer
- André Hossein (1905–1983), composer
- Aygün Kazımova (born 1971), pop singer
- Fatma Mukhtarova (1893–1972), opera singer
- Rubaba Muradova (1930–1983), mugham and folk singer
- Hassan Sattar (born 1949), pop singer

=== Monarchy ===
- Tadj ol-Molouk (1896–1982), Queen consort of Iran

=== Politicians ===
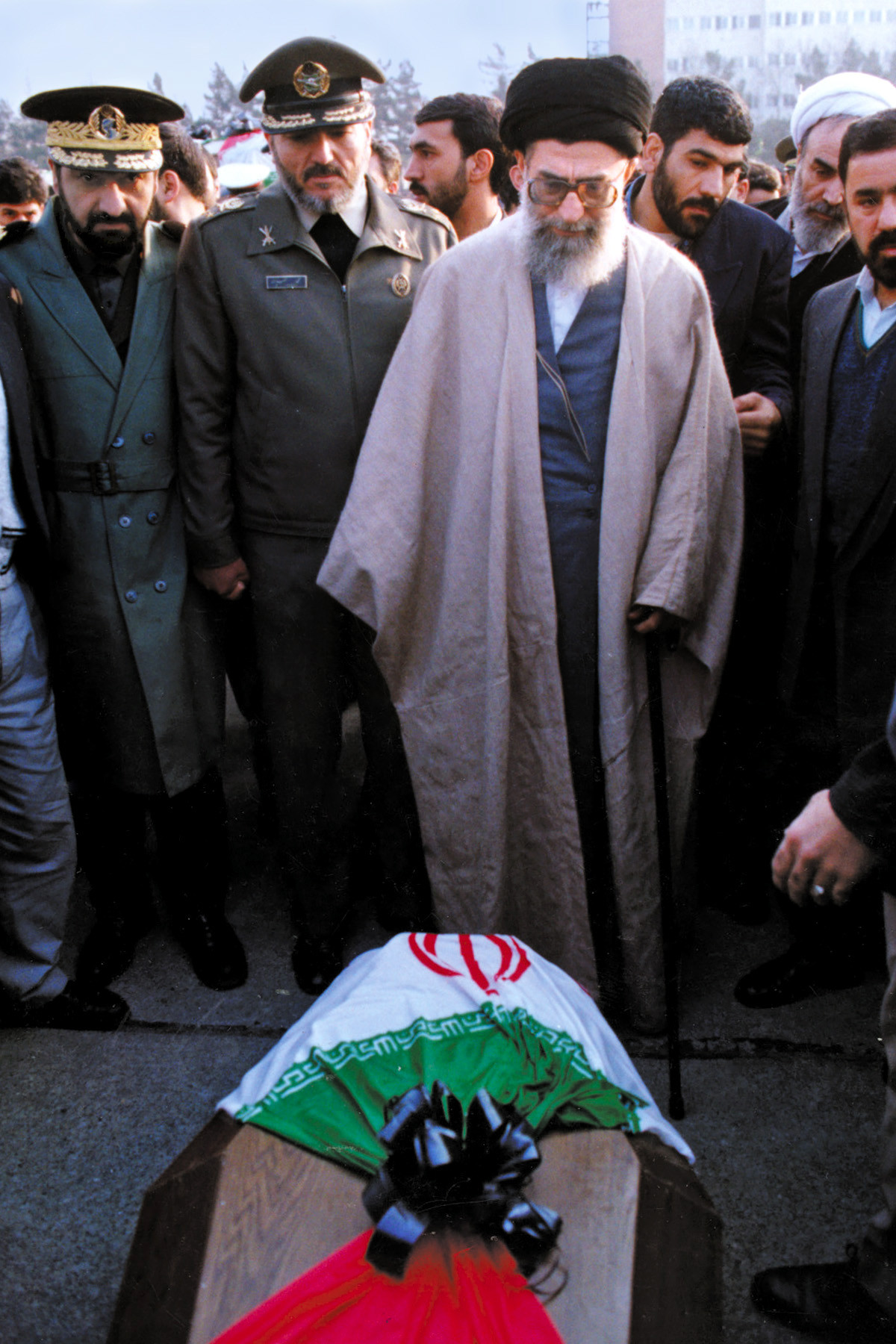
Ali Khamenei, Supreme Leader of Iran and formerly the 3rd President of Iran

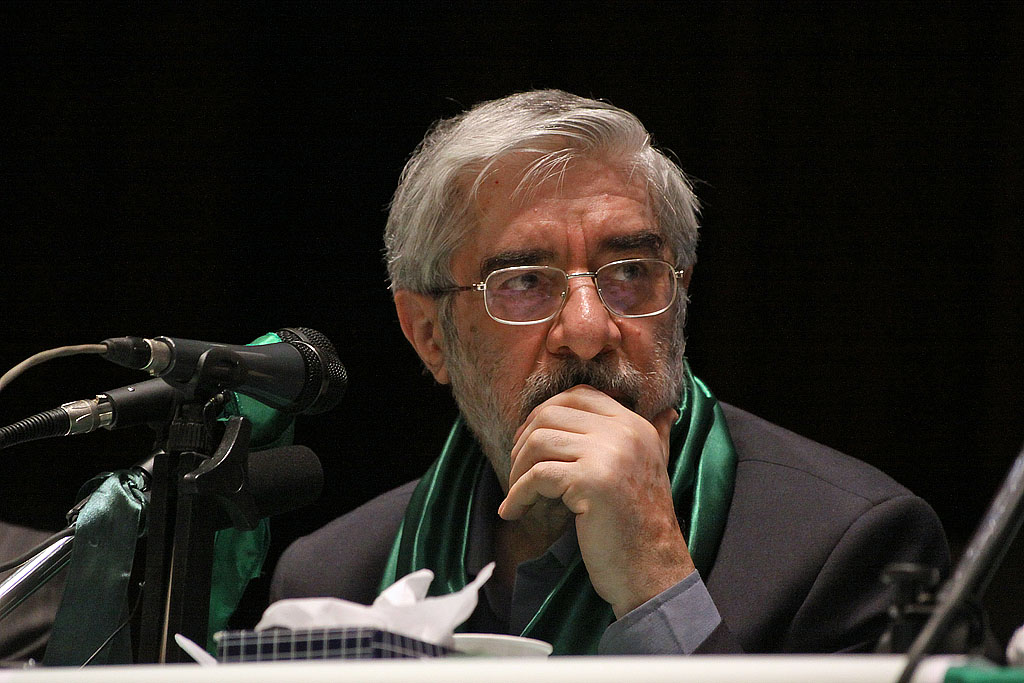
Mir-Hossein Mousavi, last Prime Minister of Iran from 1981 to 1989, current leader of Iranian opposition

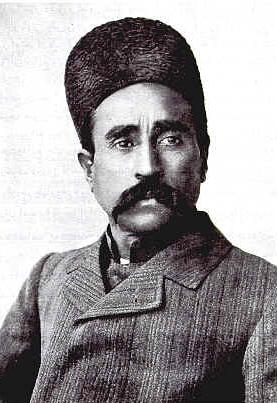
Sattar Khan was a key figure in the Iranian Constitutional Revolution and one of the greatest heroes of Persia (Iran).

- Gholam Reza Aghazadeh (born 1949), politician
- Mina Ahadi (born 1956), politician
- Mehdi Bazargan (1908–1995), politician
- Mahmudali Chehregani (born 1958), politician
- Piruz Dilanchi (born 1965), politician and poet
- Parviz Fattah (born 1961), politician
- Mir Bashir Gasimov (1879–1949), politician
- Ebrahim Hakimi (1863–1959), politician
- Mahmud Jam (1884–1969), politician
- Ali Khamenei (1939–2026), President of Iran and Supreme Leader of Iran
- Sadegh Mahsouli (born 1959), politician
- Mohsen Mehralizadeh (born 1955), politician
- Reza Moridi (born 1945), politician
- Mir-Hossein Mousavi (born 1942), politician
- Masoud Pezeshkian (born 1954), ninth and current president of Iran since 2024
- Ali Soheili (1896–1958), politician
- Amir Hatami (born 1965), defense minister of Iran

=== Revolutionaries ===
- Bagher Khan (1870–1911), constitutional revolutionary leader
- Haydar Khan e Amo-oghli (1880–1921), revolutionary and politician
- Sattar Khan (1866–1914), constitutional revolutionary leader
- Mohammad Khiabani (1880–1920), revolutionary, cleric and politician
- Ja'far Pishevari (1893–1947), the founder and chairman of the socialist Azerbaijan People's Government

=== Scientists ===
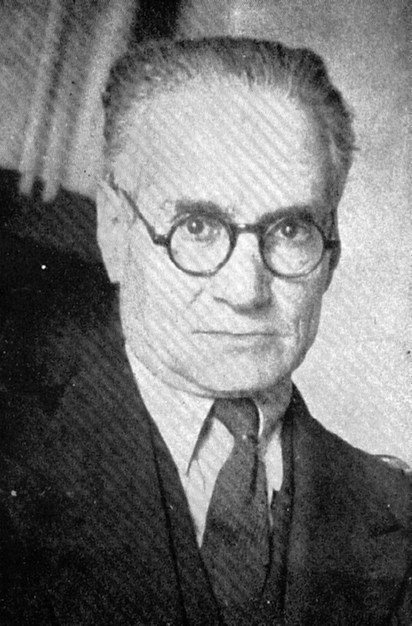
Ahmad Kasravi, one of the most famous Iranians in Iran's modern history. He is known for his discovery of the Ancient Azari language.

- Shahriar Afshar (born 1971), physicist and inventor
- Ali Murad Davudi (1922–1979), philosopher
- Ali Javan (1926–2016), physicist and inventor
- Ahmad Kasravi (1890–1946), linguist, historian, reformer, nationalist politician, author and philosopher
- Kazem Sadegh-Zadeh (born 1942), analytic philosopher

=== Sports ===
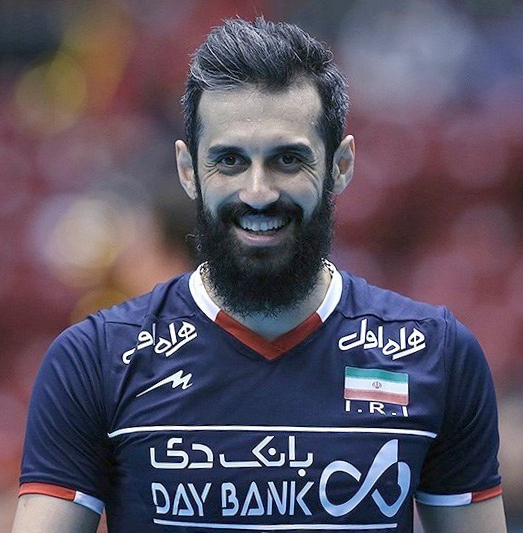
Saeid Marouf, Captain of the national team of Iran.

- Hossein Reza Zadeh (born 1978), weightlifter and double Olympic champion
- Ali Daei (born 1969), footballer and coach
- Rahim Aliabadi (born 1943), wrestler
- Javad Allahverdi (born 1954), footballer
- Sajjad Anoushiravani (born 1984), weightlifter
- Karim Ansarifard (born 1990), footballer
- Aziz Asli (1938–2015), footballer
- Karim Bagheri (born 1974), footballer
- Cyrus Dinmohammadi (born 1970), footballer
- Parviz Ghelichkhani (born 1945), footballer
- Yahya Golmohammadi (born 1971), footballer
- Yousef Karami (born 1983), taekwondo athlete
- Rasoul Khatibi (born 1978), footballer
- Saeid Marouf (born 1985), volleyball setter of national team of Iran
- Purya Fayazi (born 1993), volleyball player of national team of Iran
- Mohammad Navazi (born 1974), footballer
- Ali Akbar Ostad-Asadi (born 1965), footballer
- Mohammad Paziraei (1929–2002), wrestler
- Hadi Saei (born 1976), taekwondo athlete and double Olympic and world champion
- Jafar Salmasi (1918–2000), weightlifter
- Aboutaleb Talebi (born 1945), wrestler
- Kimia Alizadeh (born 1998), taekwondo athlete and Iran's first female Olympic medalist

=== Writers ===
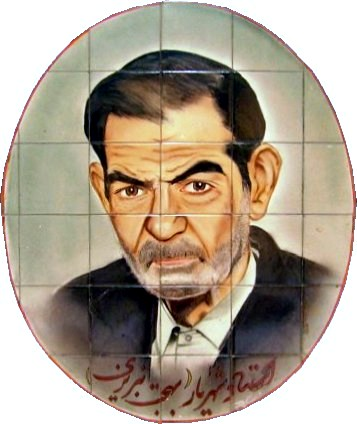
Mohammad Hossein Shahriar was an outstanding Azerbaijani poet from Iran.

- Reza Baraheni (1926–2000), novelist, poet and politician
- Samad Behrangi (1939–1967), political writer
- Izzeddin Hasanoglu (13th–14th centuries), the founder of literature in Azerbaijani language
- Mirza Ibrahimov (1911–1993), writer, playwright, Chairman of the Presidium of the Supreme Soviet of Azerbaijan SSR (1954–1958)
- Naser Manzuri (born 1953), novelist and linguist
- Iraj Mirza (1874–1926), poet and politician
- Ali Mojuz (1873–1934), satirical poet
- Seyid Abulgasim Nabati (1812–1873), poet
- Ebrahim Nabavi (born 1958), political journalist, satirist
- Ali Nazem (1906–1941), poet, writer and literary critic
- Mir Jalal Pashayev (1908–1978), writer and literary critic, honored scientist of Azerbaijan SSR
- Bulud Qarachorlu (1926–1979), poet
- Khasta Qasim (1684–1760), poet
- Hassan Roshdieh (1851–1944), teacher, politician, and journalist
- Gholam Hossein Saedi (1936–1985), writer
- Mohammad Hossein Shahriar (1906–1988), poet
- Qovsi Tabrizi (1568–1640), poet

== Turkey ==
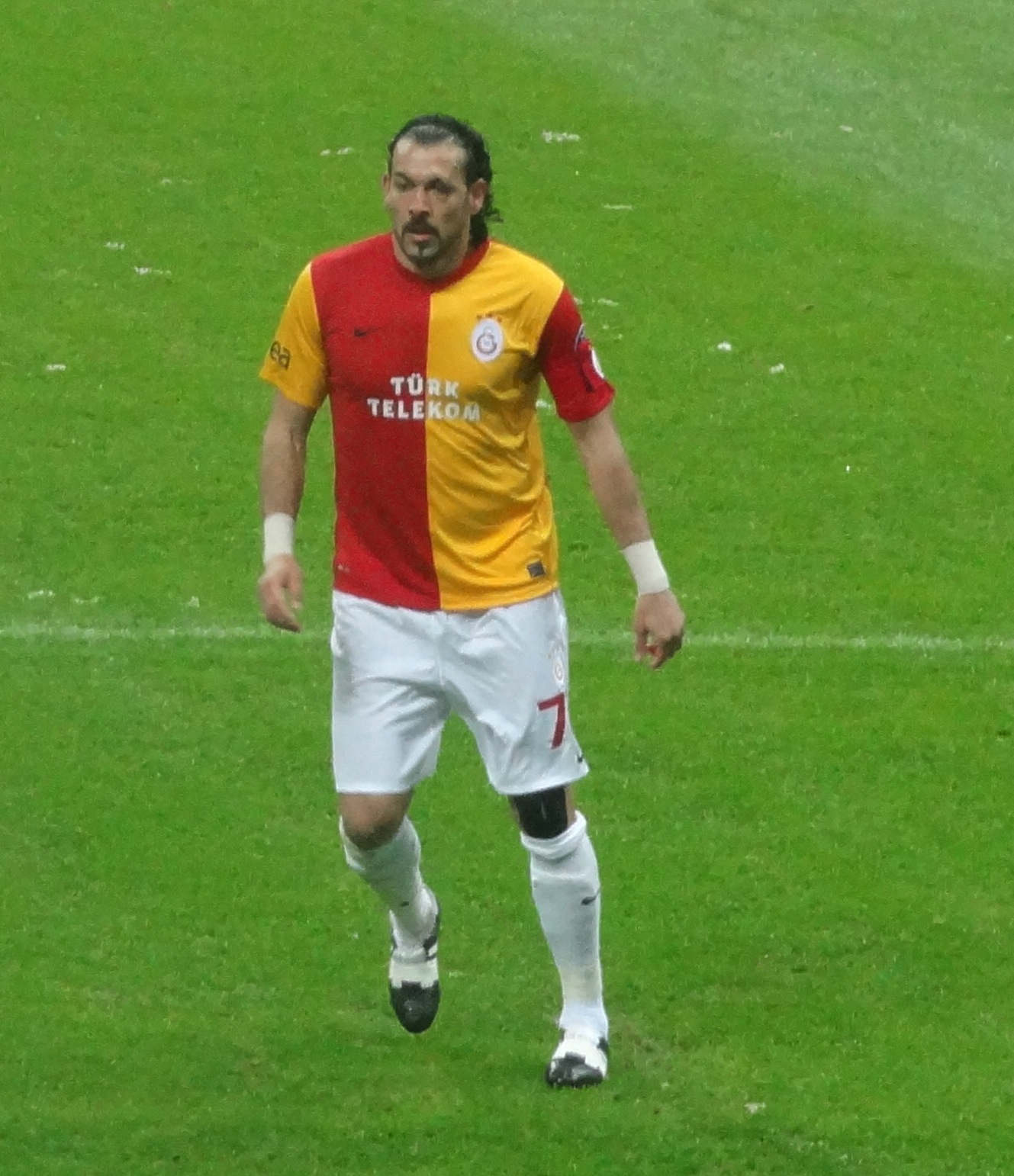
Servet Çetin is a member of the Turkey national football team.

=== Actors ===
- Nesrin Cevadzade (born 1981), actress
- Tamer Karadağlı (born 1967), actor
- Nevra Serezli (born 1944), actress
- Mehmet Karaca, actor

=== Literature ===
- Ataol Behramoğlu (born 1942), poet, translator

=== Musicians ===
- Yusuf Aktaş, better known as Reynmen (born 1995), singer
- Edis Görgülü (born 1990), British-born Turkish singer of Azerbaijani origin
- Tuğba Ekinci (born 1976), pop singer
- Nuray Hafiftaş (born 1964), folk singer
- Cem Karaca (1945–2004), musician

=== Politicians ===
- Sinan Oğan (born 1967), politician
- Kıznaz Türkeli (born 1968), politician
- Ahmet Ağaoğlu (1869–1939), politician and journalist

=== Sports ===
- Vasıf Arzumanov (born 1988), wrestler
- Servet Çetin (born 1981), footballer
- Sinan Şamil Sam (born 1974), boxer
- Servet Tazegül (born 1988), taekwondo practitioner and Olympic champion

=== Other ===
- Süreyya Ağaoğlu (1903–1989), first female lawyer in Turkey
- Acun Ilıcalı (born 1969), TV producer, entrepreneur and president of Hull City A.F.C.

== Georgia ==
=== Actors ===
- Govhar Gaziyeva (1887–1960), actress

=== Activists ===
- Dilara Aliyeva (1929–1991), women's rights activist and scholar

=== Artists ===
- Shamistan Alizamanli (born 1959), singer, poet and military speaker
- Geysar Kashiyeva (1929–1972), painter
- Hamlet Isakhanli (born 1948), mathematician, poet, social scientist, founder of Khazar University

=== Military ===
- Abdulhamid bey Gaytabashi (1884–1920), military general

=== Musicians ===
- Rashid Behbudov (1915–1989), singer and actor
- Khadija Gayibova (1893–1938), first Azerbaijani female pianist
- Shovkat Mammadova (1897–1981), first Azerbaijani opera singer
- Niyazi (1912–1984), musical conductor and composer
- Abdulla Shaig (1881–1959), poet and writer

=== Politicians ===
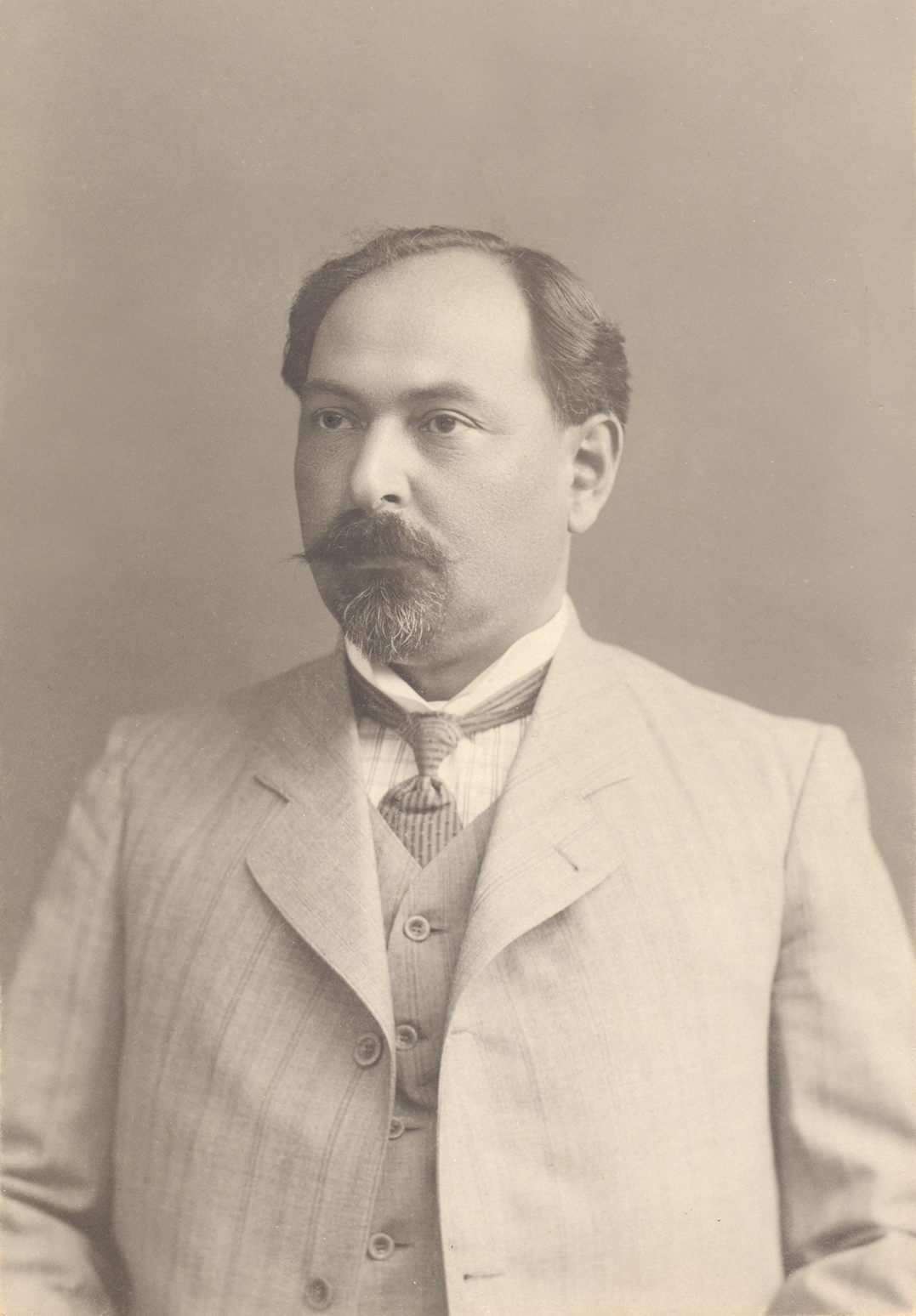
Nariman Narimanov was a writer and a major public and political figure in Azerbaijan.

- Hasan Hasanov (born 1940), first Prime Minister of Azerbaijan
- Nariman Narimanov (1870–1925), politician, writer and Chairman of the Council of People's Commissars of the Azerbaijan SSR
- Alimardan Topchubashev (1862–1934), politician, foreign minister and Minister of External Affairs of Azerbaijan Democratic Republic (1918), Head of the Parliament in absentia of Azerbaijan Democratic Republic (1918–1920)
- Raul Usupov (1980–2005), politician
- Peri-Khan Sofiyeva (1884–1951), Georgian deputy of Azerbaijani origin, the first Muslim woman to become a deputy, deputy of the Democratic Republic of Georgia (1918–1920)

=== Scientists, mathematicians, and medical professionals ===
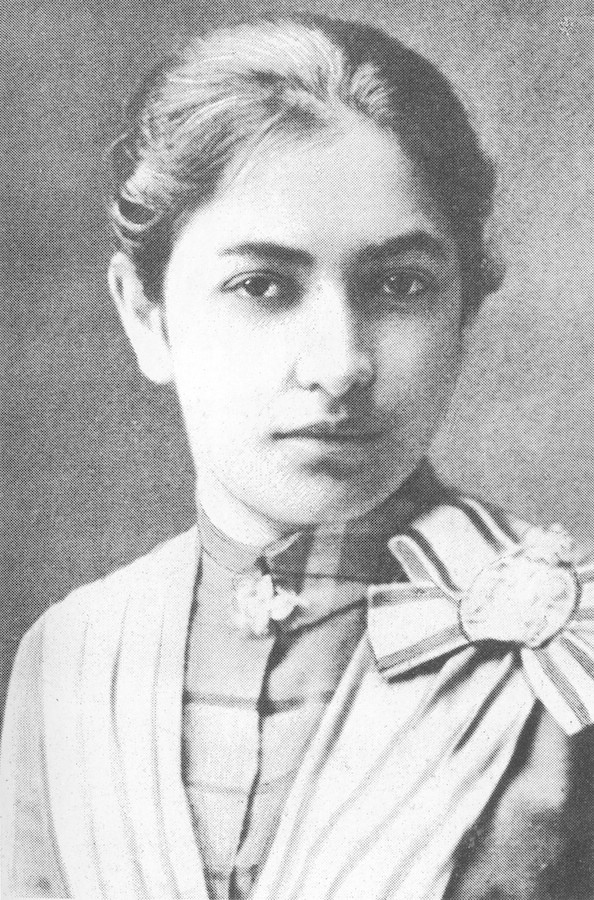
- Nigar Shikhlinskaya was the first Azerbaijani nurse.
  Hamlet Isakhanli (born 1948), mathematician, poet, social scientist, founder of Khazar University
- Nigar Shikhlinskaya (1871–1931), the first Azerbaijani nurse

=== Sports ===
- Farid Mansurov (born 1982), wrestler, Olympic champion
- Zabit Samedov (born 1984), kickboxer
- Ramila Yusubova (born 1989), judoka

== Russia ==
=== Actors ===
- Marziyya Davudova (1901–1962), actress
- Shafiga Mammadova (born 1945), film and theater actress
- Timur Rodriguez (born 1979), showman, singer and TV personality

=== Journalists ===
- Chingiz Mustafayev (1960–1992), journalist posthumously awarded the title of National Hero of Azerbaijan

=== Military ===
- Habibullah Huseynov, Soviet colonel and Hero of the Soviet Union

=== Musicians ===
- Asaf Zeynally (1909–1932), composer, founder of the romance in Azerbaijani music and Azerbaijani children's music

=== Politicians ===
- Geydar Dzhemal (born 1947), philosopher, politician and social activist
- Georgiy Mamedov (born 1947), diplomat
- Tofig Zulfugarov (born 1959), politician

=== Scientists, mathematicians, and medical professionals ===
- Chingis Izmailov (1944–2011), psychophysiologist

=== Sports ===
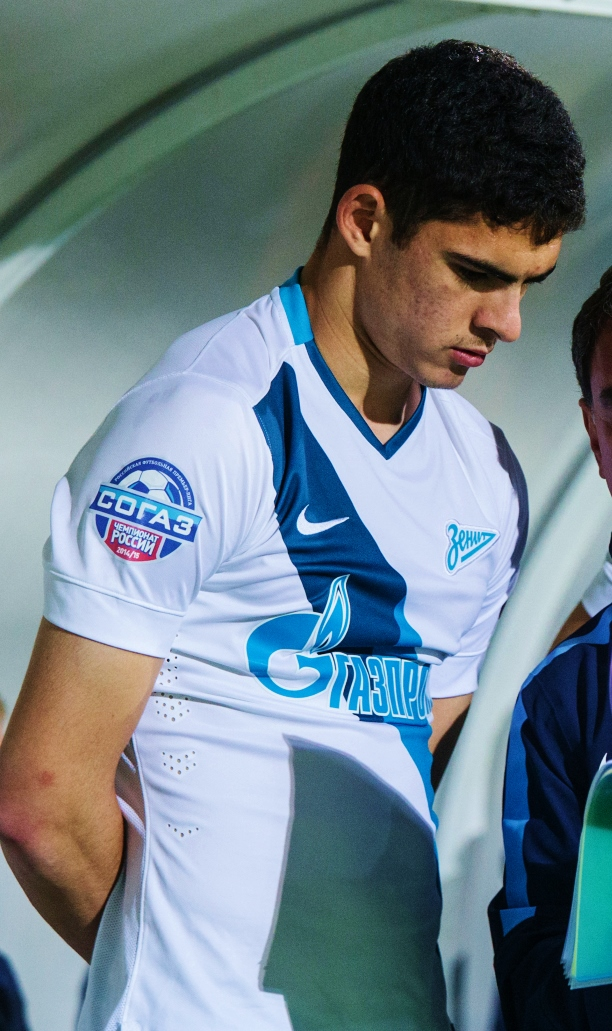
Ramil Sheydayev is a member of the Azerbaijan national football team.

- Tamilla Abassova (born 1982), Olympic silver medalist
- Emin Garibov (born 1990), artistic gymnast
- Ayaz Guliyev (born 1996), footballer
- Qadir Huseynov (born 1986), chess grandmaster
- Emin Mahmudov (born 1992), footballer
- Ramiz Mamedov (born 1992), footballer
- Aleksandr Samedov (born 1984), footballer
- Ramil Sheydayev (born 1996), footballer

== Armenia ==
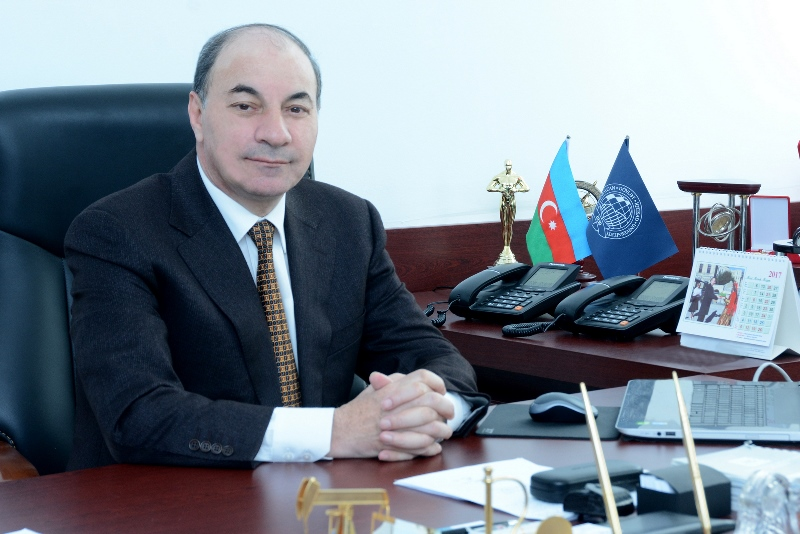
Avaz Alakbarov, ex-Minister of Finance of Azerbaijan Republic

=== Artists ===
- Mirza Kadym Irevani (1825–1875), ornamentalist artist and portraitist

=== Film industry ===
- Farman Karimzade (1937–1989), writer, screenwriter and film director
- Huseyn Seyidzadeh (1907–1983), film director

=== Military ===
- Etibar Hajiyev (1971–1992), soldier
- Habib bey Salimov (1881–1920), Major–General of Azerbaijan Democratic Republic

=== Musicians ===
- Ashig Alasgar (1821–1926), poet and folk singer
- Said Rustamov (1907–1983), composer and conductor

=== Politicians ===
- Ismat Abbasov (born 1954), politician
- Avaz Alakbarov (born 1952), politician and economist
- Aziz Aliyev (1896–1962), politician
- Ogtay Asadov (born 1955), politician
- Zulfi Hajiyev (1935–1991), politician
- Shahin Mustafayev (born 1965), politician
- Akbar agha Sheykhulislamov (1891–1961), politician

=== Scientists ===
- Heydar Huseynov (1908–1950), philosopher
- Mammad agha Shahtakhtinski (1846–1931), linguist and politician
- Mustafa Topchubashov (1895–1981), surgeon and academician

=== Sports ===
- Ramazan Abbasov (born 1983), footballer
- Samir Aliyev (born 1979), footballer
- Rovshan Huseynov (born 1975), boxer
- Khagani Mammadov (born 1976), footballer
- Vitaliy Rahimov (born 1984), wrestler

=== Writers ===
- Farman Karimzade (1937–1989), writer, screenwriter and film director
- Hidayat Orujov (born 1944), writer and politician

== United Kingdom ==
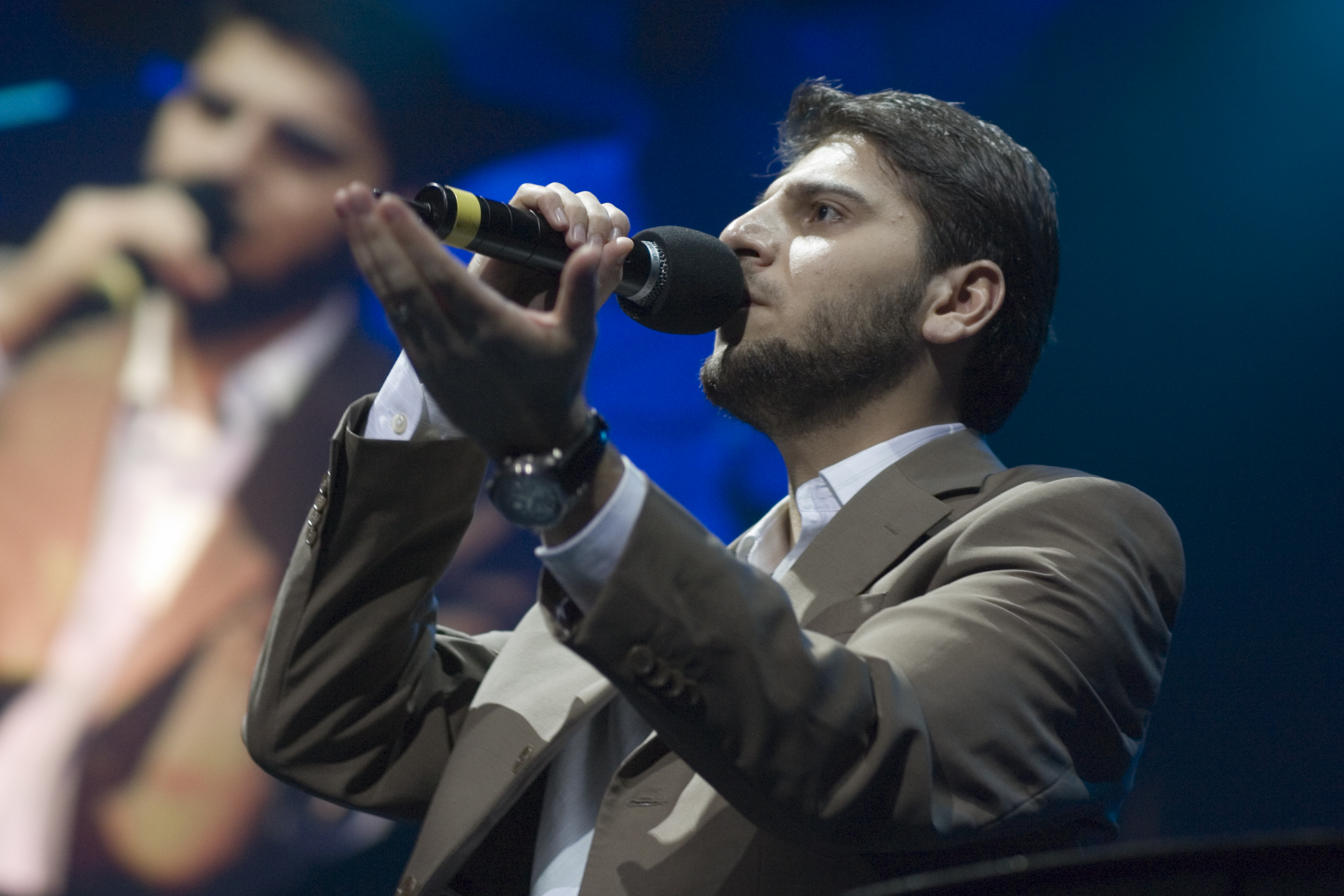
Sami Yusuf performing at Glasgow Royal Concert Hall

- Elyar Fox (born 1995), singer, musician and songwriter
- Nigar Jamal (born 1980), singer
- Donald Swann (1923–1994), composer, musician and entertainer
- Sami Yusuf (born 1980), singer

== United States ==
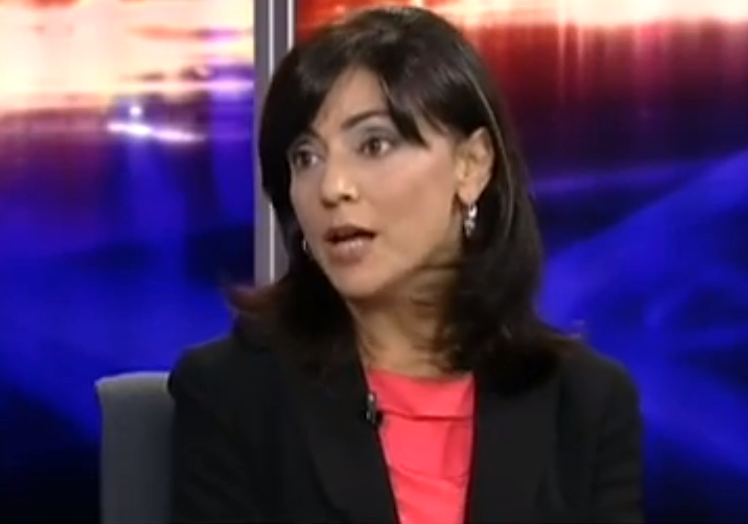
Sibel Edmonds is a founder of the National Security Whistleblowers Coalition (NSWBC).

- Nima Arkani-Hamed (born 1972), theoretical physicist
- Sona Aslanova (1924–2011), soprano singer
- Nik Caner-Medley (born 1983), basketball player
- Sibel Edmonds (born 1970), translator and founder of the National Security Whistleblowers Coalition
- Chingiz Sadykhov (1929–2017), pianist
- Norm Zada (born 1954), founder of Perfect 10 magazine

== Other places ==
=== Belarus ===
- Natik Bagirov (born 1964), judoka
- Leila Ismailava (born 1989), journalist
- Kamandar Madzhidov (born 1961), Olympic, world and European wrestling champion
- Rashad Mammadov (born 1974), judoka

=== Iraq ===
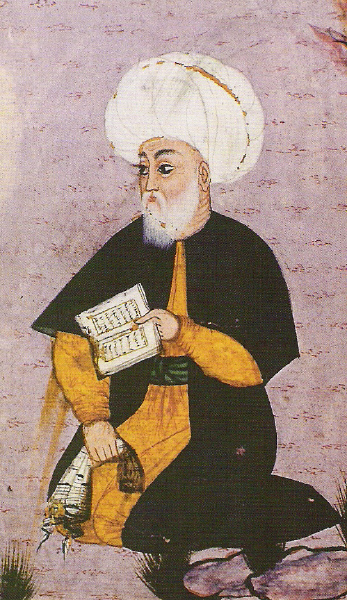
Fuzuli is considered one of the greatest contributors to the Dîvân tradition of Azerbaijani literature.

- Fuzuli (1494–1556), poet and thinker
- Nasimi (1369–1417), mystical poet
- Amel Senan (born 1966), actress

=== France ===
- Robert Hossein (1927–2020), film actor, director, and writer
- Irène Mélikoff (1917–2009), turkologist

=== Hungary ===
- Gábor Kubatov (born 1966), politician

=== Spain ===
- Eddy Pascual (born 1992), footballer

=== Turkmenistan ===
- Hajibala Abutalybov (born 1944), mayor of Baku
- Elnur Hüseynov (born 1987), singer
- Tahira Tahirova (1913–1991), politician

=== Ukraine ===
- Oleh Babayev (1965–2014), politician and mayor of Kremenchuk
- Fatma Gadri (1907–1968), actress
- Pavlo Pashayev (born 1988), footballer

=== Uzbekistan ===
- Stalic Khankishiev (born 1968), chef
- Movlud Miraliyev (born 1974), judoka

== See also ==
- List of companies of Azerbaijan
- Azerbaijani people
- Iranian Azerbaijanis
