= Khumar Gadimova =

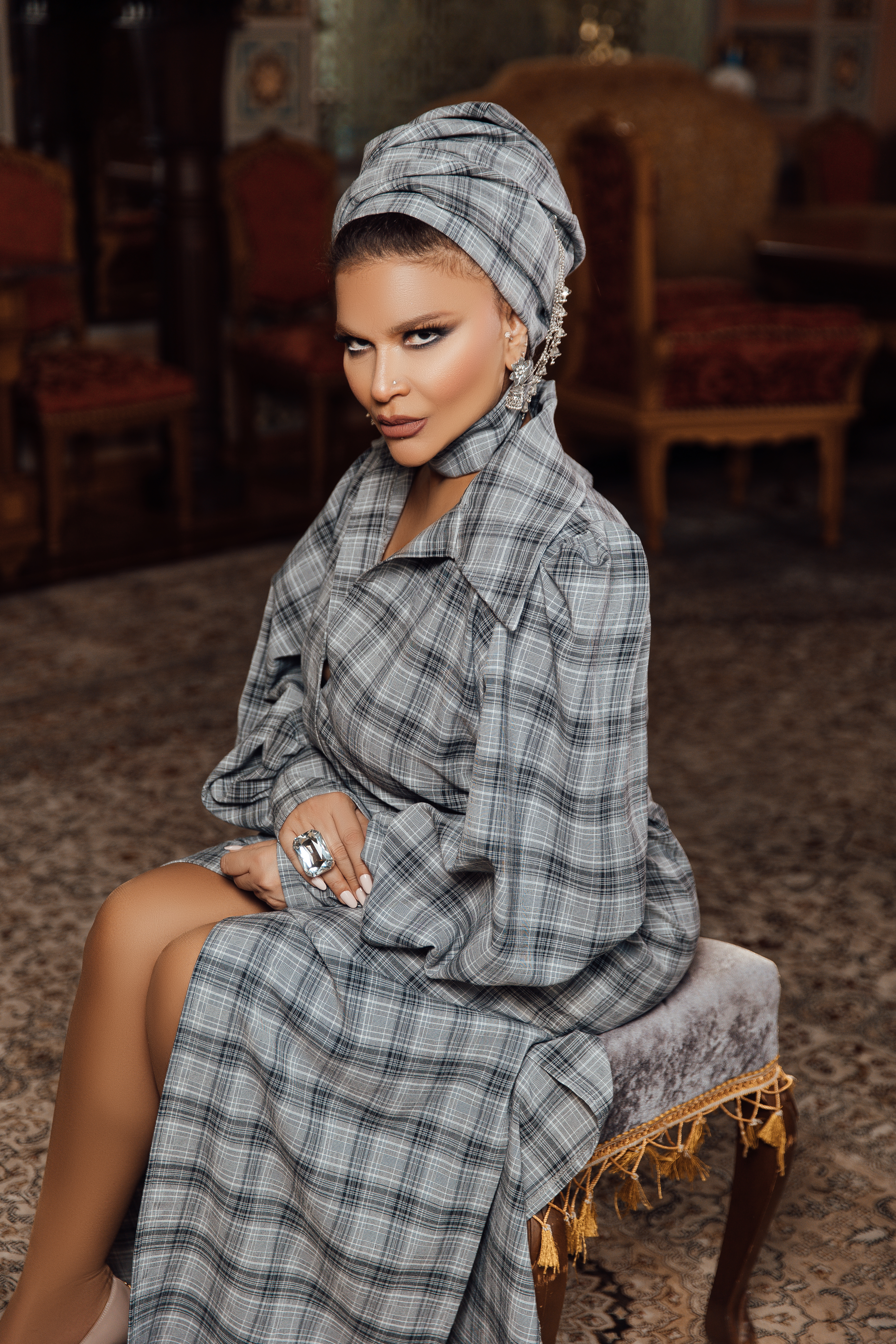

Background information
- Born: 26 April 1966 (age 60); Gazakh, Azerbaijan SSR, USSR
- Genres: Pop; Soul; Folk music
- Occupations: Singer-songwriter; Director; Actress; Pianist; Composer
- Instrument: Vocals
- Years active: 1997–present

Khumar Gadimova (Azerbaijani: Xumar Qədimova, also known as Xumar, born 26 April 1966) is an Azerbaijani pop singer, composer, actress, pianist, director, and Honored Artist of Azerbaijan (2017).

== Biography ==
Khumar Gadimova was born on 26 April 1966, in the Gazakh district. From 1983 to 1987, she studied at the Mirzaagha Aliyev Azerbaijan State Institute of Theater, specializing in "Director of Mass Performances." After completing her higher education, she worked as an administrator at the Seaside Boulevard for some time. Later, she continued her career at the Mirzaagha Aliyev Azerbaijan State Institute of Theater. Khumar Gadimova began her artistic career in 1997. To date, she has performed over 200 musical works. She has drawn inspiration from folk literature as well as various periods of Azerbaijani and Turkish literature. She has composed exceptional musical pieces based on the works of great poets and writers such as Nizami, Nasimi, Nazim Hikmet, Yunus Emre, Necip Fazıl Kısakürek, Molla Panah Vagif, Suat Sayın, Mohammad-Hossein Shahriar, Huseyn Javid, Almas İldırım, Mikayıl Mushfig, Samad Vurghun, Rasul Rza, Khalil Rza Uluturk, Bakhtiyar Vahabzada, Zelimkhan Yagub, Nusrat Kasamanli, Nariman Hasanzada, Rasul Hamzatov, Ahmet Kaya, Ramiz Rovshan, Kamal Abdulla, and Mikayıl Mirza.

In 2003, she won the "Voice Artist" award for her song Ayrılıq in a competition held in Turkey among Azerbaijani singers. In 2007, she held a solo concert titled "Bir Can Türkiyə-Azərbaycan" at the Maslak TİM Concert Hall in Istanbul, Turkey.

Her compositions have also been performed by well-known Turkish and Uzbek singers, including Kibariye, Yıldız Tilbe, the Kafkaz Kardeşleri group, and Uzbekistan's State Artist Sevinç Muminova.

On 3 March 2017, she was awarded the honorary title of Honored Artist of the Republic of Azerbaijan for her valuable contributions to the country's cultural field.

- In 2019, she created a composition dedicated to Nəsimi in honor of the "Year of Nəsimi."
- In 2021, she composed a piece for the "Year of Nizami Ganjavi."
- In 2022, she created the Shusha composition in connection with the "Year of Shusha."
