= Mirvarid Dilbazi =

Azerbaijani poet

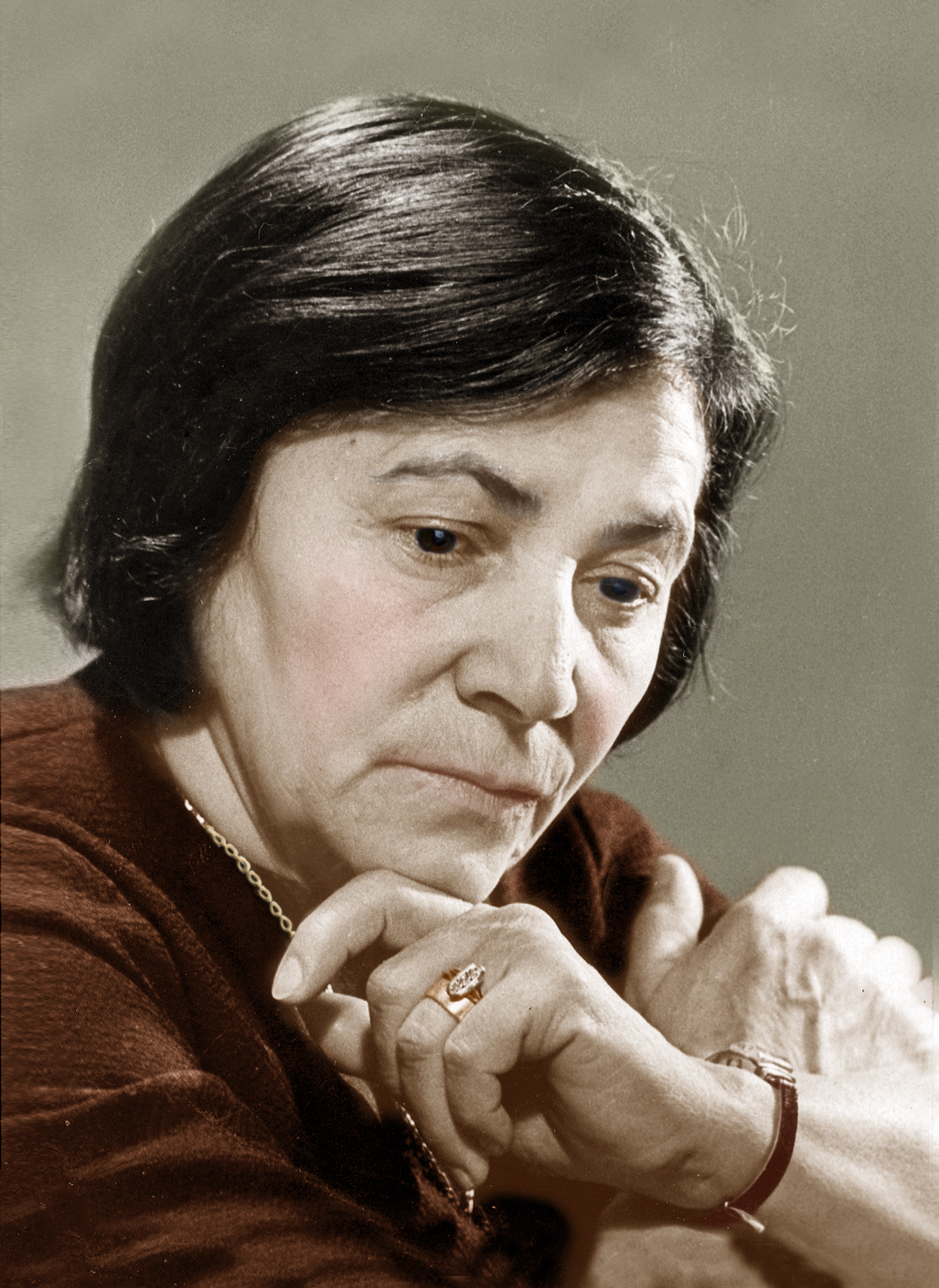
- Born: August 19, 1912; Musaköy, Kazakh uezd, Elizavetpol Governorate, Russian Empire
- Died: July 12, 2001 (aged 88); Baku, Azerbaijan
- Occupations: poet, writer
- Awards

Mirvarid Dilbazi (Azerbaijani: Mirvarid Paşa qızı Dilbazi), (19 August 1912, Xanlıqlar, Azerbaijan – 12 July 2001, Baku) was an Azerbaijani poet.

== Biography ==
She was born in the village of Xanlıqlar located in the Gazakh, Azerbaijan. Both of her grandfathers, Haji Rahim and Abdurahman Dilbazi, were poets. In 1921, Mirvarid moved to Baku and got admitted to the newly established Female Boarding School. After six years of studying, Mirvarid started teaching at elementary school in Bilajari. Upon graduation from Azerbaijan Pedagogical Institute, she moved to Guba and continued teaching there.

Mirvarid Dilbazi's first poem, Women's Emancipation, was published in 1927. Her first book, Our Voice, followed in 1934. After that, she wrote numerous poems and children's books such as First Spring (1937), Love for Motherland (1942), Memories (1945), Dream of the Master (1948), Images of life (1967), Algerian Girl (1961), To my Younger Fellows (1956), Spring is Coming (1968), etc.

Between the 1920s and 1930s, the most burning issue among the Azerbaijani intelligentsia related to women's emancipation. This theme became very popular in literature. For example, there was Jafar Jabbarli's play "Sevil,"1 Mammad Said Ordubadi's "Misty Tabriz,"2 and others. What was meant by women's emancipation was first of all taking off the chadors [veils], then women's participation in governmental affairs and women's literacy.

Women's literacy had been forbidden by the religious leaders. Girls were not taught to write; a few of them had managed to learn how to read a bit of the Quran, which was published in the Arabic script.

From her interview:—

"Chadors (veils) have been one of the greatest tragedies of Eastern women. I must tell you, however, that as far as Azerbaijan was concerned, only women living in the southern regions near the Iranian border and some in Baku wore them. Women in the northern regions were not familiar with them."

"Then a major campaign was launched against illiteracy. The idea was to make everyone literate, no matter how old they were. My sister was a teacher and was involved in this campaign. She went house to house, registering people, so that no one could be left out. Then the teachers would go to the homes and instruct the people, especially women. Schools opened later on. People were very interested in learning how to read. Later when the schools opened, attendance was compulsory. If parents didn't send their children to school-both boys and girls-they were held accountable.

"One of the greatest difficulties for our nation has been that we have changed our Azerbaijani alphabet four times in this century. First, there was the Arabic script that we used for more than a millennium, then the Latin script was introduced in 1927, then Cyrillic in 1937. Then we reverted to Latin again in 1991 as soon as we gained our independence.

"Changing the alphabet is a violent blow to the cultural heritage of any nation. It means that the entire legacy of the older generation cannot be read and accessed by the younger generation. Changing our alphabet four times this century has resulted in isolating us from our own thinkers. I guess under such circumstances, I should consider myself one of the lucky ones to be born in an era where I was exposed in my youth to all three alphabets-Arabic, Cyrillic and Latin. But so many people didn't have that chance."

Dilbazi has also translated works by writers such as Pushkin, Khagani and Nizami. In 1979, she was named "People's Poet of Azerbaijan". President Heydar Aliyev awarded her with the Istiglal Order (Order of Sovereignty) in 1998. During her long lifetime, Mirvarid witnessed Stalin's Repressions of 1937, the tragic losses of World War II, and the First Nagorno-Karabakh War.

Mirvarid's cousin, Amina Dilbazi, was a well-known Azeri ballet-master and folk-music dancer.
