= Ildirim Organization =

Ildirim
- İldırım təşkilatı
- Azerbaijani
- Formation: 1942
- Founder: Ismikhan Rahimov; Gulhuseyn Huseynoghlu; Haji Zeynalov
- Founded at: Baku
- Dissolved: 1946
- Type: nationalist, antisoviet, student organization.
- Location: Soviet Union

The Ildirim Organization was a secret, nationalist student organization established in Azerbaijan in 1942 against the Soviet occupation. The goals of the organization members were to protect and expand the use of the Azerbaijani language, appoint Azerbaijanis to high administrative positions, and establish an independent Azerbaijan.

In 1948, all eight members of the group were arrested. The Supreme Court of the Azerbaijan SSR sentenced them to severe penalties, including the loss of voting rights, confiscation of their property, and imprisonment. Three members received 25-year sentences, while the remaining five were sentenced to 10 years in prison.

After their release from prison, each of them continued their education. They excelled in their fields and were awarded various scientific and honorary titles.

== About ==
The Ildirim Organization was founded in 1942 by Ismikhan Rahimov, Haji Zeynalov, and Gulhuseyn Huseynoglu. Later, Musa Abdullayev, Kamal Aliyev, Azer Alasgarov, Aydin Vahidov, and Kamil Rzayev also joined the organization. Consisting of university students, the group had a total of 8 members. The organization had its own program and oath. The swearing-in ceremonies took place in early 1944 at Aydin Vahidov's apartment, with the text of the oath compiled by Ismikhan Rahimov. The main goals of the organization's members were the independence of Azerbaijan, the protection and promotion of the Azerbaijani language as the state language, enabling Azerbaijanis to hold high positions in state institutions, and urging the state to acquit writers who were arrested, labeled as enemies of the people, exiled to Siberia, or executed during 1937–1938. The members were exiled to Siberia and remained imprisoned until 1955, two years after Stalin's death. They were formally acquitted in 1956.

I swear by salt and bread, symbols of honor and friendship, by my mother's milk, and by my pure conscience. I pledge to remain loyal to my organization and comrades until the very end. Should I ever break this oath, may I be severely punished and cursed.

— The organization's oath

At an event of the Azerbaijan Writers' Union on May 10, 1944, Samad Vurgun criticized the Union's work, highlighting the lack of proper development in Azerbaijani literature. He spoke about national literature, consciousness, and identity. Inspired by his words, the members of the Ildirim Organization wrote a letter to Samad Vurgun on May 11, proposing that he can lead the organization as a guiding figure. At the dictation of Gulhuseyn Huseynoglu, Ismikhan Rahimov wrote the letter in a printed-style script to conceal the writer's identity. In the letter, they questioned why the Writers' Union had only 60 members, why the national rights of Azerbaijanis were not safeguarded, and why scientific books were not translated into Azerbaijani. They pledged to fight for the independence of the Azerbaijani people and expressed their support for Samad Vurgun, asking him to write a poem titled "Stars of the Homeland" (Azerbaijani: "Vətən Ulduzları") if he agreed with their ideas. However, it remains unclear whether the letter ever reached him. The organization ceased its activities in 1946 due to internal disagreements among its members.

After the letter fell into the hands of the NKVD in 1945, all students in Azerbaijan's higher education institutions were subjected to a handwriting dictation. Through this process, it was determined that the letter to Samad Vurgun had been written by Ismikhan Rahimov. He was placed under surveillance, and after sufficient evidence was collected, Ismikhan Rahimov was arrested on September 26, 1948. Shortly afterward, Haji Zeynalov and the remaining six members of the organization were also detained. On September 21–22, 1949, the Judicial Board for Criminal Cases of the Supreme Court of the Azerbaijan SSR handed down sentences. Gulhuseyn Huseynoglu, Ismikhan Rahimov, and Haji Zeynalov received 25-year prison terms, while the other five members were sentenced to 10 years. Interestingly, the five others with lighter sentences protested in court, demanding equal punishment. The members were exiled to Siberia and remained imprisoned until 1955, two years after Stalin's death. They were formally acquitted in 1956.

== Members ==
Gulhuseyn Huseyn oglu Abdullayev was born on October 16, 1923, in the village of Mollaoba, Masalli district. He received his secondary education in Baku. In 1942, he worked in the editorial office of the "Kommunist" newspaper, and in 1945–1947, in the "Ədəbiyyat" newspaper. In 1947, he graduated from the Philology Department of Azerbaijan State University. In 1942, he met frequently with Haji Zeynalov and Kamil Rzayev. After meeting Ismikhan Rahimov, he and Haji Zeynalov founded the nationalist Ildirim organization. He was arrested in 1948 and sentenced to 5 years of deprivation of voting rights and 25 years of imprisonment, with all his property confiscated. After his arrest, he spent 7 years cutting trees in the Tayshet and Bodaybo forests and served his sentence in a correctional labor camp. After being acquitted in 1956, he returned to Baku and worked as a teacher, senior teacher, associate professor, and professor at the Department of History of Azerbaijani Literature at the Faculty of Philology of Azerbaijan State University until the end of his life. In 2002, he was awarded a personal pension by the President of the Republic of Azerbaijan. In 2005, he was awarded the honorary title of "People's Writer" of Azerbaijan. He died in Baku on July 8, 2013.

Haji Habib oglu Zeynalov was born in Lankaran in 1925. He later moved to Baku with his family. After completing his secondary education at school number 132, he entered the Persian language department of the Philology Faculty of Azerbaijan State University in 1943. Together with Gulhuseyn Huseynoglu and Ismikhan Rahimov, he founded the nationalist Ildirim organization. While a fourth-year student, he began working as a censor at the Main Department of Literature and Publishing of the Azerbaijan SSR. He worked there until March 1948. In August 1948, he began working as the corresponding secretary of the journal "Proceedings of the Academy of Sciences of the Azerbaijan SSR." He was arrested in 1948 and was deprived of the right to vote for 5 years and sentenced to 25 years in prison by the Supreme Court of the Azerbaijan SSR, with the confiscation of all his property. He was released in 1955 and acquitted in 1956. After returning from exile, he was appointed as the head of the Editorial and Publishing Board Department of the Azerbaijan Academy of Sciences from 1959 to 1989. Haji Zeynalov, a recipient of several state awards, died on October 24, 1989.

Ismikhan Mammad oglu Rahimov was born in Baku on September 18, 1925. In 1937, his father was arrested and shot by the Soviet regime. He was admitted to the Institute of Foreign Languages in 1941. In 1943, he graduated with honors and then enrolled in the Philology Faculty of Azerbaijan State University. During his studies, he was also admitted to the Azerbaijan Medical Institute. In 1946, he graduated with honors from the Philology Faculty of Azerbaijan State University. He interrupted his medical education due to his admission to postgraduate studies. He was arrested in 1948. He was deprived of the right to vote for 5 years and imprisoned for 25 years, with the confiscation of all his property. He was released in 1955 and acquitted in 1956. After returning to Baku, he resumed his postgraduate studies. In 1959, he defended his dissertation on the work of George Byron. He devoted the rest of his life to teaching and science. He was the head of the department and dean of the Azerbaijan State Institute of Foreign Languages. He created a methodology for rapid learning of English. He is the author of several books and dictionaries in the field of linguistics. Ismikhan Rahimov was awarded the Order of "Glory" on October 28, 2000, for his services to education in Azerbaijan. In 2002, he was awarded a personal pension by the President of the Republic of Azerbaijan. He died in Baku on December 15, 2004.

Aydin Majid oglu Vahidov was born on July 11, 1925, in Baku. After graduating from secondary school, he entered the Moscow Aviation Institute in 1943 with his friend Kamal Aliyev. However, due to the difficulties arising during World War II, they had to interrupt their studies and return to Baku. Here, he continued his education at the Azerbaijan Industrial Institute. In 1944, he became a member of the Ildirim organization. When he was arrested in 1948, he was a fifth-year student, married, and had one daughter. The Supreme Court of the Azerbaijan SSR sentenced him to 10 years in prison and 5 years of deprivation of rights, with the confiscation of all his property. He was released in 1955 and acquitted in 1956. He was reinstated at the Azerbaijan Industrial Institute, where he had studied, and graduated in the same year. After graduating, he worked as an engineering technologist at the Baku Repair and Tractor Plant, as a department head at the Kalinin Plant, and as a director at the Baku Experimental Plant and the B. Sardarov Machine-Building Plant. Aydin Vahidov, who was awarded several state awards, died in Baku in 2007.

Musa Mirmammad oglu Abdullayev was born on November 27, 1927, in the village of Gizilaghaj, Masalli District. After receiving his secondary education in Baku, he entered the Faculty of Treatment and Prevention of the Azerbaijan State Medical Institute, as well as the English Faculty of the Azerbaijan State Pedagogical Institute of Foreign Languages. In 1944, he became a member of the Ildirim organization. He was arrested in 1948. He was deprived of the right to vote for 5 years and imprisoned for 10 years by the Supreme Court of the Azerbaijan SSR, with the confiscation of all his property. He was released from prison in 1955 and acquitted in 1956. After returning from exile, he continued his education and graduated in 1958. He worked in the field of hematology and became a doctor of medical sciences, professor, and philologist-translator. He is the author of several books in the field of medicine, including the first "English-Azerbaijani Medical Dictionary" in the USSR. He worked as the head of the department at the Azerbaijan Medical Institute until his death. He died in Baku on August 8, 1979.

Kamal Alibakhis oglu Aliyev was born in Baku on September 27, 1925. After graduating from secondary school, he entered the Moscow Aviation Institute with his friend Aydin Vahidov in 1943. However, due to the difficulties arising during World War II, they had to interrupt their studies and return to Baku. He continued his education at the Azerbaijan Industrial Institute. In 1944, he became a member of the Ildirim organization. In 1948, when he was a fifth-year student, he was arrested two weeks after his wedding. He was deprived of his right to vote for 5 years and imprisoned for 10 years, with the confiscation of all his property. He was released in 1955 and acquitted in 1956. In the same year, he was reinstated at the Azerbaijan Industrial Institute, where he had studied, and graduated. After graduating, he worked first as a mechanic at the Kalinin plant and then as a chief engineer at the Kirovsk plant. In 1963, he was appointed director of the Bolshevik plant. In 1966, by the decision of the Presidium of the Supreme Soviet of the Azerbaijan SSR, he was awarded the title of "Honored Engineer". He died on December 11, 1977.

Azer Abdulkhalig oglu Alaskarov was born in Baku in 1926. He graduated from the Persian language department of the Philology Faculty of Azerbaijan State University. In 1944, he became a member of the Ildirim organization. He was arrested on November 7, 1948, and was deprived of the right to vote for 5 years, with a 10-year prison sentence and the confiscation of all his property, as decreed by the Supreme Court of the Azerbaijan SSR. He was released in 1955 and acquitted in 1956. For many years, he worked as a simultaneous translator from Russian to Azerbaijani at the Azerbaijan State Information Agency. He died in the 1980s.

Kamil Abdulla oglu Rzayev was born in Baku in 1924. After graduating from school number 132, he entered the Azerbaijan Institute of National Economy. In 1942, he met frequently with Haji Zeynalov and Gulhuseyn Huseynoglu. He was drafted into the military in 1942 and participated in World War II. From September 1942 to January 1943, he served as a scout in the 352nd Reserve Anti-Aircraft Artillery Regiment, and from May 1944 to April 1947, he served as a scout in the 667th Howitzer Artillery Regiment. He was discharged from the reserve on April 11, 1947. For his bravery, he was awarded the Order of the Red Star (No. 18173995), the Medal for the Capture of Königsberg, and the Medal for Victory over Germany. After completing his service, he returned to Baku and continued his unfinished studies at the Azerbaijan Institute of National Economy. He was arrested in 1949 and sentenced by the Supreme Court of the Azerbaijan SSR to 5 years of deprivation of the right to vote and 10 years of imprisonment, with the confiscation of all his property. By decision of the Supreme Soviet of the USSR, he was released from prison in 1954, with all his rights restored. He returned to Baku and was reinstated at the institute where he had studied to complete his unfinished studies. He had health problems due to having served his sentence in Siberia. He died in 1957.

== Legacy ==
Ziya Bunyadov wrote about the organization for the first time 42 years later. He published an extensive article titled "Ildirim" in the March 17–18, 1990 issue of the "Azerbaijani Youth" newspaper, providing information about the organization's activities. In 1993, he published a book titled "Red Terror" that provided more detailed information about the organization, including their interrogations, protocols, and other information.

In 2002, the documentary films "Ildirim" by Asaf Guliyev and " "Travelers of the Thunderous Road " by Musallim Hasanov were made about the organization.

In 2017, an auditorium named after Ismikhan Rahimov was opened at the Azerbaijan University of Languages.

=== Films ===
- İldırım (film)
- "İldırımlı yolun yolçuları" / "Travelers of the Thunderous Road"
- Musa Abdullayevin anadan olmasından 93 il ötür / 93 years have passed since the birth of Musa Abdullayev / ATV
- Azərbaycan tarixinin səhifələri "İldırım" təşkilatı / Pages of Azerbaijani history "İldırım" organization / Mədəniyyət TV
- Azərbaycanlıların SSRİ-yə qarşı qarşı gizli təşkilatı – "İldırım" / The secret organization of Azerbaijanis against the USSR – "İldırım" / Belə belə İşlər

== Sources ==
- Zeynalova, Məhfuzə (2020). "Студенческая антисоветская организации «Илдырым» и ее место в политической истории Азербайджана". Milli Azərbaycan Tarixi Muzeyi (PDF) (in Russian). Baku: Aspoliqraf. ISBN 978-9952-518-23-8.
- Bünyadov, Ziya (1993). Qırmızı terror (PDF). Baku: Azərnəşr. Archived from the original (PDF) on 2024-08-28.
- Yaqublu, Nəsiman (2018). Azərbaycan Milli Azadlıq Hərəkatı Ensiklopediyası (Sovet rejiminə qarşı mübarizə: 1920–1991). Baku: "Ziya" NPM. ISBN 978-9952-36-521-4.
- Nəsrullayev, Nüsrət (2006). Qızılağac və qızılağaclılar (in Azerbaijani). Bakı: Adiloğlu.
