= Memorial Museum of Molla Panah Vagif and Molla Vali Vidadi =

Museum in Qazakh, Azerbaijan

- Molla Pənah Vaqif və Molla Vəli Vidadinin xatirə muzeyi
- Former name: Memorial Museum of Molla Panah Vagif
- Established: 20 November, 1970
- Location: Qazakh, Azerbaijan
- Coordinates: 41.089456°N 45.358708°E

Memorial Museum of Molla Panah Vagif and Molla Vali Vidadi is a museum in Qazakh, Azerbaijan. There are 1235 exhibits in it, which are mostly dedicated to the life and works of Molla Panah Vagif and Molla Vali Vidadi. There are also other exhibits of accessories, household items, clothes, pictures, guns belonging to the 18th century.

== History ==
Museum was opened on 20 November 1970 and its initial name was Memorial Museum of Molla Panah Vagif. Though, in 2002, the name of the museum was changed to include Molla Vali Vidadi.
