= Mikayil =

Mikayil is a given name. Notable people with the name include:

- Mikayil Abdullayev (1921–2002), Soviet and Azerbaijani painter
- Mikayil Alakbarov (1924–1943), Azerbaijani soldier
- Mikayil Aliyev (born 1994), Azerbaijani taekwondo practitioner
- Mikayil Faye (born 2004), Senegalese footballer
- Mikayil Huseynov (1905–1992), Soviet Azerbaijani architect
- Mikayil Jabbarov (born 1976), Azerbaijani politician.
- Mikayil Jabrailov (1952–1990), Azerbaijani soldier
- Mikayil Mikayilov (born 1981), Azerbaijani theater director.
- Mikayil Mirza (1947–2006), Azerbaijani actor.
- Mikayil Mushfig (1908–1938), Azerbaijani poet.
- Mikayil Yusifov (born 1982), Azerbaijani footballer.
