= Apardi sellar Sarani =

"Apardi seller Sarani" (Azerbaijani: Apardı sellər Saranı, The floods took Sara) is an Azerbaijani folk song centered on the life of a girl named Sara.

== Stories ==
=== The daughter of river ===
The events take place in the village of Muğan, (Note: There are 18 places called Muğan in Azerbaijan. None of the places with articles in either Azerbaijani or English Wikipedia is near the Arpa.) where a happily married couple Sarvan (Azerbaijani: Sərvan) and Gözel (Azerbaijani: Gözəl) had a daughter named Sara. Gözel died in childbirth and Sara was raised by her stepmother. She used to play by the banks of Arpa river (Azerbaijani: Arpaçay) like her mother. Thus, the river became dependent to Sara. Whenever Sara was there, Arpa was raging but it was calm without her. Sara married with a beloved shepherd in Muğan named Khan-Choban (Azerbaijani: Xan Çoban). In summer, Khan-Choban had to take the flock to up-country. Sara got lonely and went back to her old friend Arpa. Village chief saw Sara and stared at her. Arpa got angry of his sensual gazing and flooded taking Sara with it.

=== Revenge ===
There was a girl living by Arpa river bank named Sara. She loved her cousin but her father wanted her to marry a rich man from neighbor village. Her cousin wanted to run away by Sara but her father didn't let it happen. Few days before the wedding, Sara's cousin feeds his horse but not let it drink. In the wedding ceremony he gives the horse to the bride. Sara rides the horse in the ceremony. The thirsty horse when see the Arpa flooding, runs toward it to drink but submerges and Arpa takes Sara.

=== The flood took Sara ===
A boy named Nuri from Khanchoban clan was fiancée by a girl named Sara from Melikchoban (Azerbaijani: Məlikçoban) clan. These clans were living in the opposite sides of the Arpa river. A group of people from Khanchoban clan came to bring the bride to the other side of the river for the wedding ceremony. When they got ready to leave, it was already dark. They didn't noticed the increased depth of water, so the horses got sunk and Sara got drowned.

=== Sara and Khan ===
Muğan got occupied by the enemy tribe. They captured the girl named Sara whose lover Khan-choban was out of the country at the time. The Khan wanted to take Sara by himself. Sara asked to see his father for the last time but run away and threw herself into the Arpa river.

== Song ==
There are many performances of this song by various artists. Some of famous ones are by Alihan Samedov, Habil Aliyev, Gadir Rustamov, etc.

== Influences ==
Many artworks have been created under the influence of this legend. Some of notable ones are A poem by Nusrat Kasamanli famous Azerbaijani poet addressed to Khan-Choban, A tele-theatre by Azerbaijani director Nazim Dadashov, a play by Iranian director Ebrahim Abbasalizadeh and a movie named Saray by Iranian director Yadollah Samadi.
