= Nazim Hajiyev =

Nazim Hajiyev can refer to:

- Nazim Mammadiyya oglu Hajiyev
- Nazim Hajiyev (activist)
