= Abdurrahman agha Dilbazoglu =

Azerbaijani Turk poet

- Born: 18th century Xanlıqlar, Kazakh Sultanate
- Died: 19th century Georgia-Imeretia Governorate, Russian Empire
- Occupation: Poet

Abdurrahman agha Dilbazoglu (18th century – 19th century) was a famous Azerbaijani Turk poet.

== Life ==
Abdurrahman agha was born in Xanliqlar village in the Qazax Sultanate. He wrote poems under the pseudonym "Şair". He was considered one of the first poets who wrote poems on the national independence struggle against the Russians. The Georgian ruler Heraclius II suspected that Abdurrahman agha was trying to unite Qazax with the Ganja Khanate. As a result of this accusation, Abdurrahman was blinded by the Georgians. He wrote this poem after his eyes were blinded:

...I am a stranger in my country, judges,
I have lost big crowds, I cry.
The heart is longing, the soul is waiting,
My eyes send candles at dawn, I cry...
