= Nazim Mammadiyya oglu Hajiyev =

Nazim Hajiyev
- Born: 3 June 1924; Shaki, Azerbaijan SSR
- Died: 30 July 1962 (aged 38); Baku, Azerbaijan SSR
- Occupation: Politician

Nazim Mammadiyya oglu Hajiyev (Azerbaijani: Nazim Məmmədiyə oğlu Hacıyev; 3 June 1924 – 30 July 1962) was a state, public and political figure of Azerbaijan.

== Biography ==
Hajiyev was born on 3 June 1924 in Nukha (present-day Shaki), Azerbaijan SSR. After completing his secondary school in 1940, he was admitted into the Faculty of Philology of Azerbaijan University of Languages.

However, shortly after the Great Patriotic War started, he left his education incomplete, returned to Nukha, and worked at the Nukha Worker newspaper. From 1941 to 1943 he worked as a language and literature teacher at school No.12 in Nukha and as a methodologist at the Nukha Public Education Department. He was appointed the executive secretary of the Nukha Worker in 1943.

From 1944, Hajiyev continued his education at university and worked at the People's Commissariat for Internal Affairs of Azerbaijan SSR in 1944-1947.

He was elected the secretary of Baku Komsomol Committee. In 1950, he was appointed as the instructor of the Propaganda Department of the Central Committee of the Communist Party of Azerbaijan, after which he was appointed secretary of the Party Committee of the Azerbaijan Medical Institute.

He was Delegate of the XIX Congress of the Communist Party of the Soviet Union (5–14 October 1952), and Delegate of the XX Congress of the Communist Party of the Soviet Union (14–21 February).

Hajiyev died on 30 July 1962 as a result of an incorrect surgical procedures deliberately performed in January 1961. He was buried at the Alley of Honor cemetery in Baku.

== Political career ==
In the 1950s, Hajiyevhe was one of the initiators and organizers of the resettlement of Meskhetian Turks to Azerbaijan, who were deported to Central Asia (Uzbekistan, Kazakhstan, and Kyrgyzstan).

In December 1960, at the Presidium of the Central Committee of Communist Party of the Soviet Union, and later in 1961, at the Political Bureau of the Central Committee of Communist Party of the Soviet Union, he substantiated the historical and legal belonging of Nagorno Karabakh and Nakhichevan to Azerbaijan and this contributed to their preservation within the Azerbaijan SSR. For these, he was accused of being a nationalist by Mikoyan and Suslov.

He was the author of over 50 books and articles on youth, culture, education, and international politics, as well as on state problems and party building.

== Memorial ==
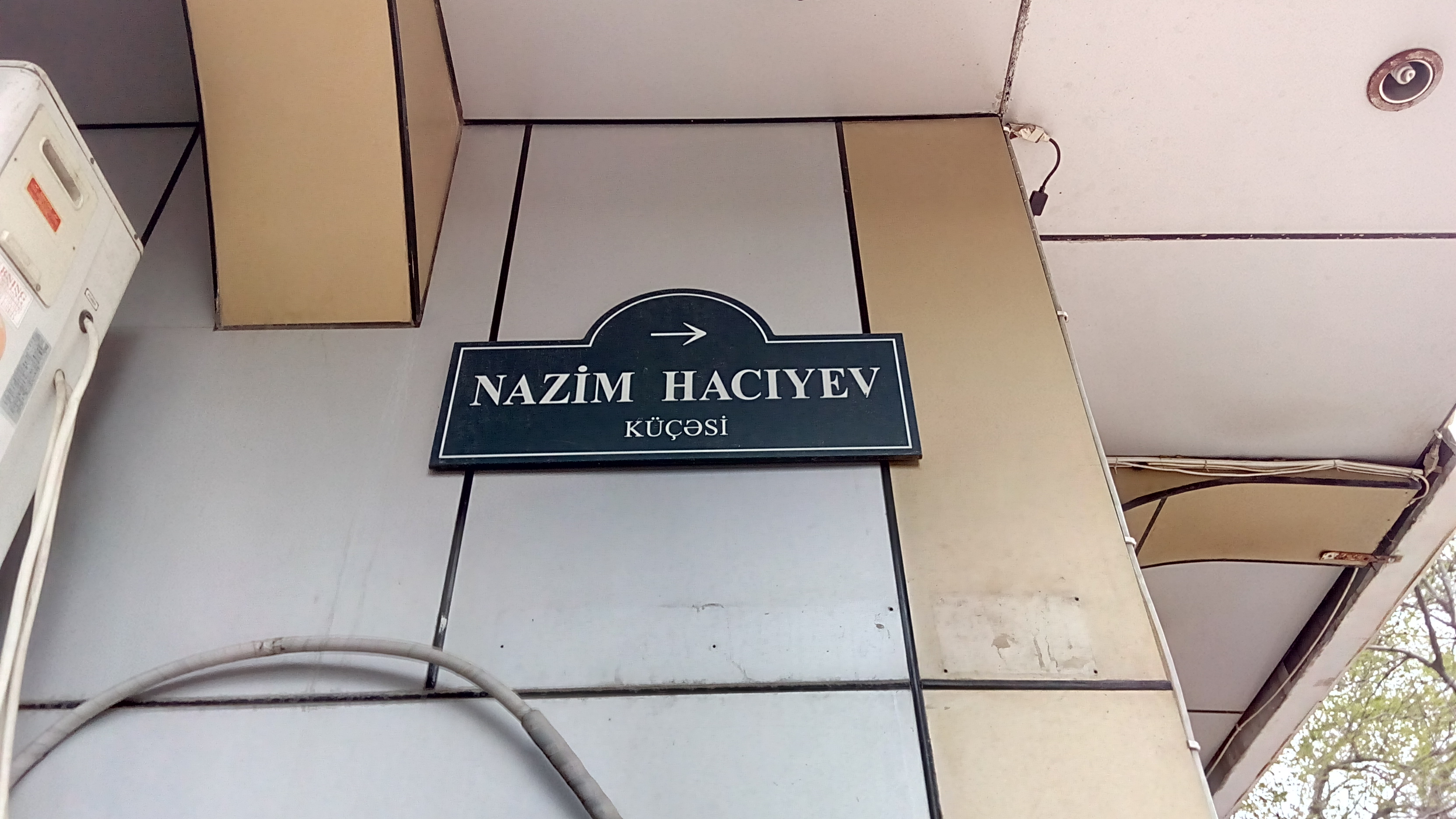

There is a street named after Nazim Hajiyev in Baku and Shaki. During the Soviet era, Shaki's central recreational club, the sovkhoz in the village of Incha and the secondary school in the village of Kunggut were named after him.

In 2019, Aranfilm Creative Center released a documentary titled The History of a Destruction based on the life and career of Nazim Hajiyev.

== Works ==
1. Гаджиев Н. М. Из практики работы по интернациональному воспитанию трудящихся. — М.: Знание, 1961. — 36 с. — 2000 экз.
2. Гаджиев Н. М. Французские встречи: [Путевые заметки участника Делегации советской молодёжи во Францию в 1955 г.]. — Баку: Детюниздат, 1956. — 130 с. — 6000 экз.

== Bibliography ==
1. Мирзоев О. Один раз живём: Имам Мустафаев, Шихали Курбанов, Назим Гаджиев. — Баку: 1991.
2. Кикнадзе А. Бакинская подкова. — Москва: 2003.
3. Полонский Л. Сквозь годы мчась... : Эссе // Литературный Азербайджан (журн.). — 2001. — №1.
4. Помпеев А. Кровавый омут Карабаха. — Кн. 2. — Баку: 1994
5. Семичастный В. Беспокойное сердце. — Москва: 2002.
6. Вышка (газ.). — 1989, 30 июня; 1993, 15 октября.
7. Молодёжь Азербайджана (газ.). — 1989, 2 ноября.
8. Азербайджан (газ.). — 1993, 9 сентября.
9. Гюнай (газ.). — 2002, 5—11 октября.
