= Molla Vali Vidadi =

Azerbaijani poet

- Born: 17 March 1709; Shamkir, Safavid Empire (in present-day Azerbaijan)
- Died: 13 May 1809 (aged 100); Shykhly, near Gazakh, Sultanate of Gazakh (in present-day Azerbaijan)
- Occupations: Poet, scribe, teacher

Molla Vali Vidadi (Azerbaijani: Molla Vəli Vidadi) (17 March 1709, Shamkir – 13 May 1809, near Gazakh) was an Azerbaijani poet.

Little is known about Vidadi. He spent most of his life in his native town of Shamkir (then called Shamkhor) where he taught at a religious school. According to some sources, Vidadi spent some years in Tiflis, Georgia, where he served as a court poet for King Erekle II. Upon the death of the king's son Levan in 1781, Vidadi wrote an elegy dedicated to the deceased. His court service did not last long, possibly due to his open criticism of the ruling class. At its early stage, Vidadi's poetry expressed a positive view on life, however as years passed, his poems began expressing a more pessimistic attitude. His was also known for his poetic dialogue with Molla Panah Vagif. Vidadi's simple and realistic (sometimes involving elements of mysticism) literary style resembled the traditional Azeri ashik genre.
