= Vagif Mausoleum =

Mausoleum in Shusha, Azerbaijan

- Vaqif türbəsi
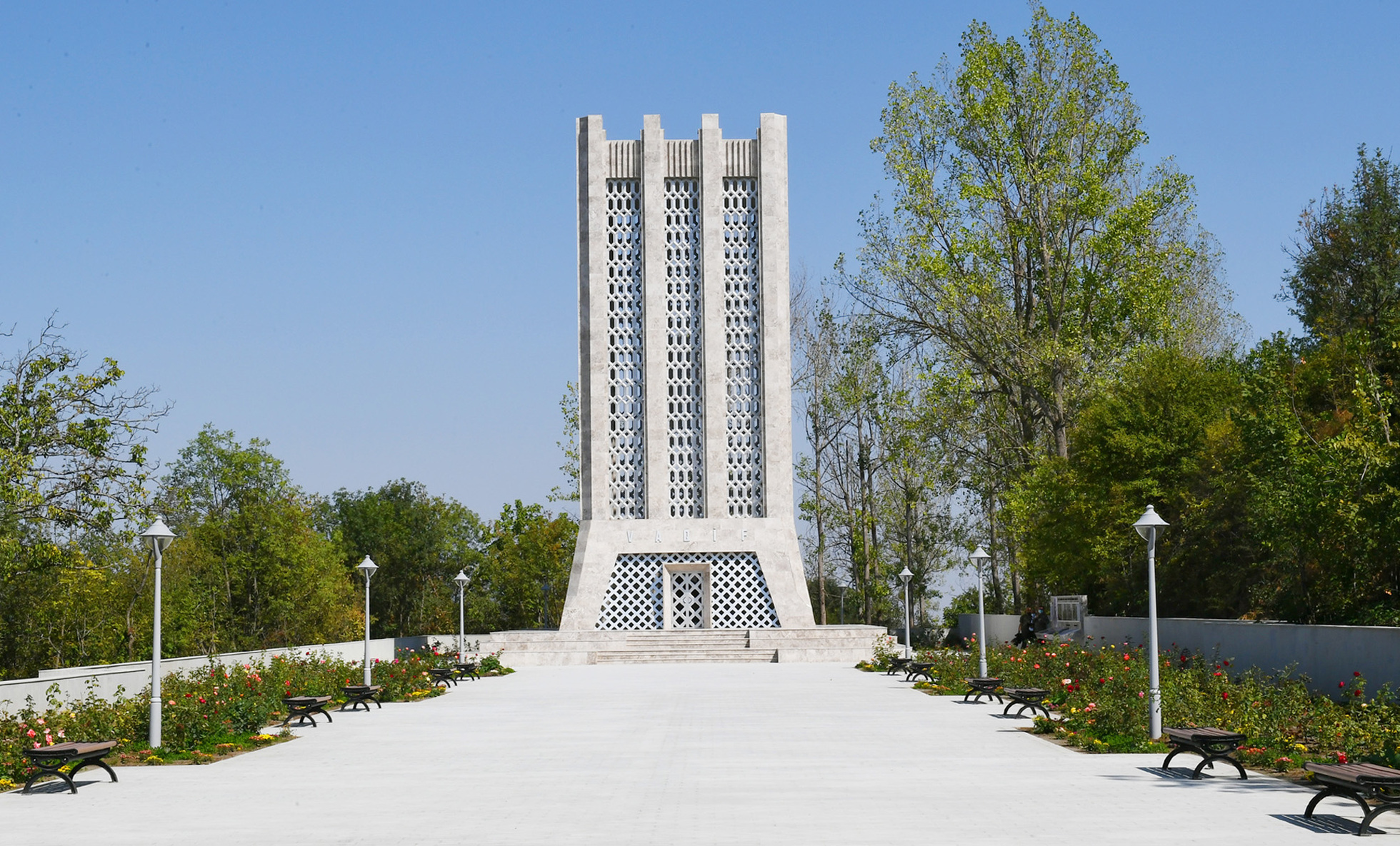
- Vagif mausoleum after restoration

General information
- Location: Shusha, Azerbaijan
- Coordinates: 39.755417°N 46.758333°E
- Construction started: 1970s
- Completed: 1982
- Demolished: partial (1992)

Height
- Height: 18 meters

Technical details
- Floor count: 1

Design and construction
- Architects: A.V. Salamzade, E.İ.Kanukov
- Main contractor: A. Mustafayev

Vagif Mausoleum (Azerbaijani: Vaqif türbəsi or Vaqif məqbərəsi) is a mausoleum located in Shusha, Azerbaijan. It is built to honor Molla Panah Vagif, a poet, diplomat and vizier (the foreign minister of the Karabakh Khanate.)

== The monument ==
The construction of the mausoleum started in the 1970s and was completed in 1982. It was inaugurated by then the First Secretary of Communist Party of Azerbaijan, Heydar Aliyev. The mausoleum was built by sculptor A. Mustafayev based on the design by a member of the National Academy of Sciences Abdul Vakhab Salamzade and well-known architect E.I. Kanukov. It is located in the southwestern part of Shusha, by the Jidir Duzu plain, where the poet was killed and is a part of Shusha State Historical and Architectural Reserve. The design of the mausoleum follows the pattern of Azerbaijani mausoleum architectural compositions such as Nizami Mausoleum in Ganja. It is 18 meters tall.

The bottom part of the monument is built with reddish Karabakh marble plates, white and grey marble. Aluminium is used for the decoration pattern in the entire length of the mausoleum. The poet's name was engraved above the entrance door.

Azerbaijani state media has claimed that the mausoleum has been vandalized by Armenian forces following the capture of Shusha in 1992. The state of the mausoleum steadily deteriorated during the Armenian control over the town from 1992 to 2020. On 17 March 2021, the reconstruction of the mausoleum was announced. On 29 August 2021, the president of Azerbaijan, Ilham Aliyev, inaugurated the restored mausoleum.

== Gallery ==
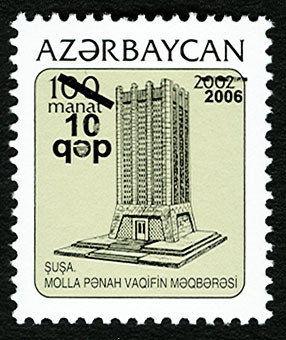
Azerbaijani stamp depicting the mausoleum

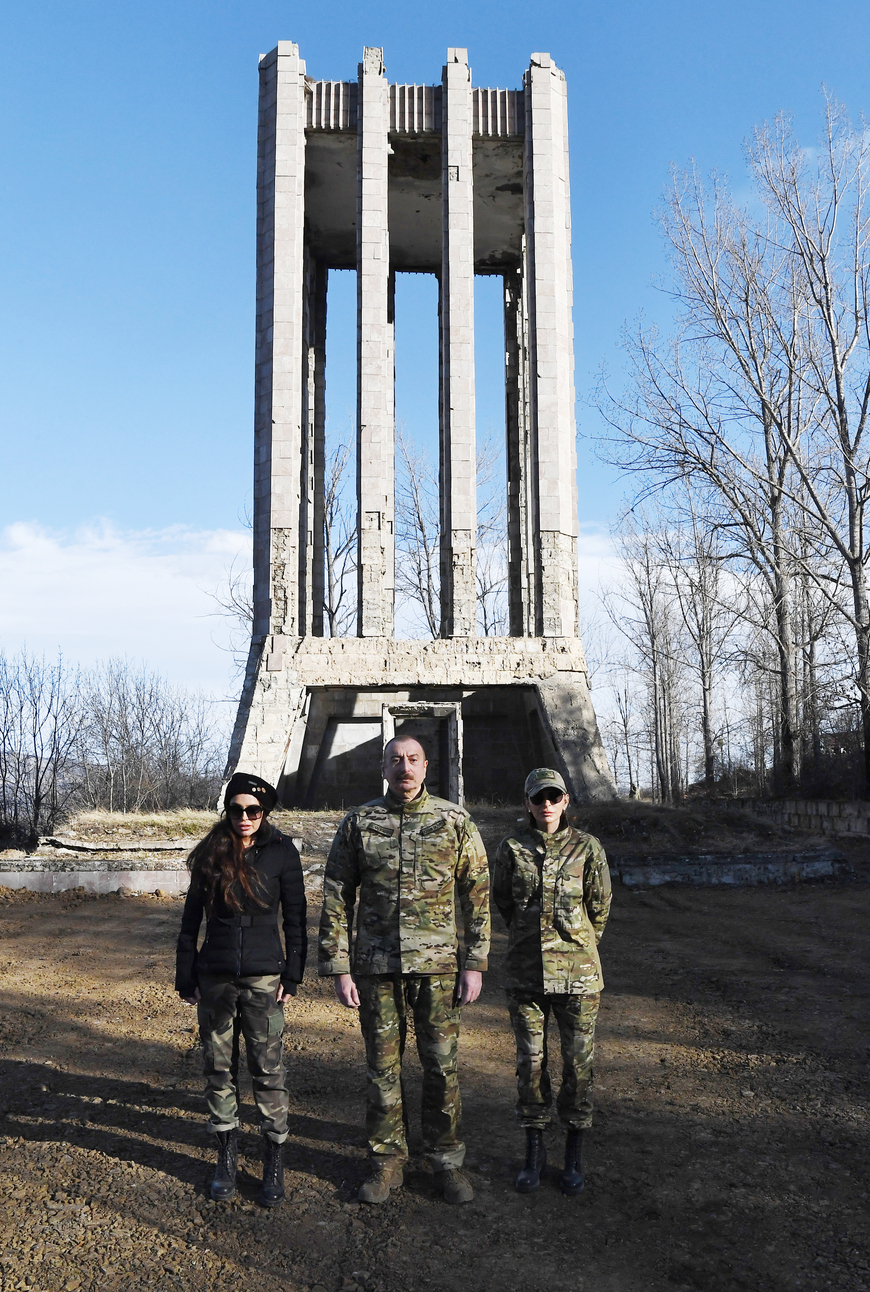
Ilham Aliyev with family in front of the mausoleum

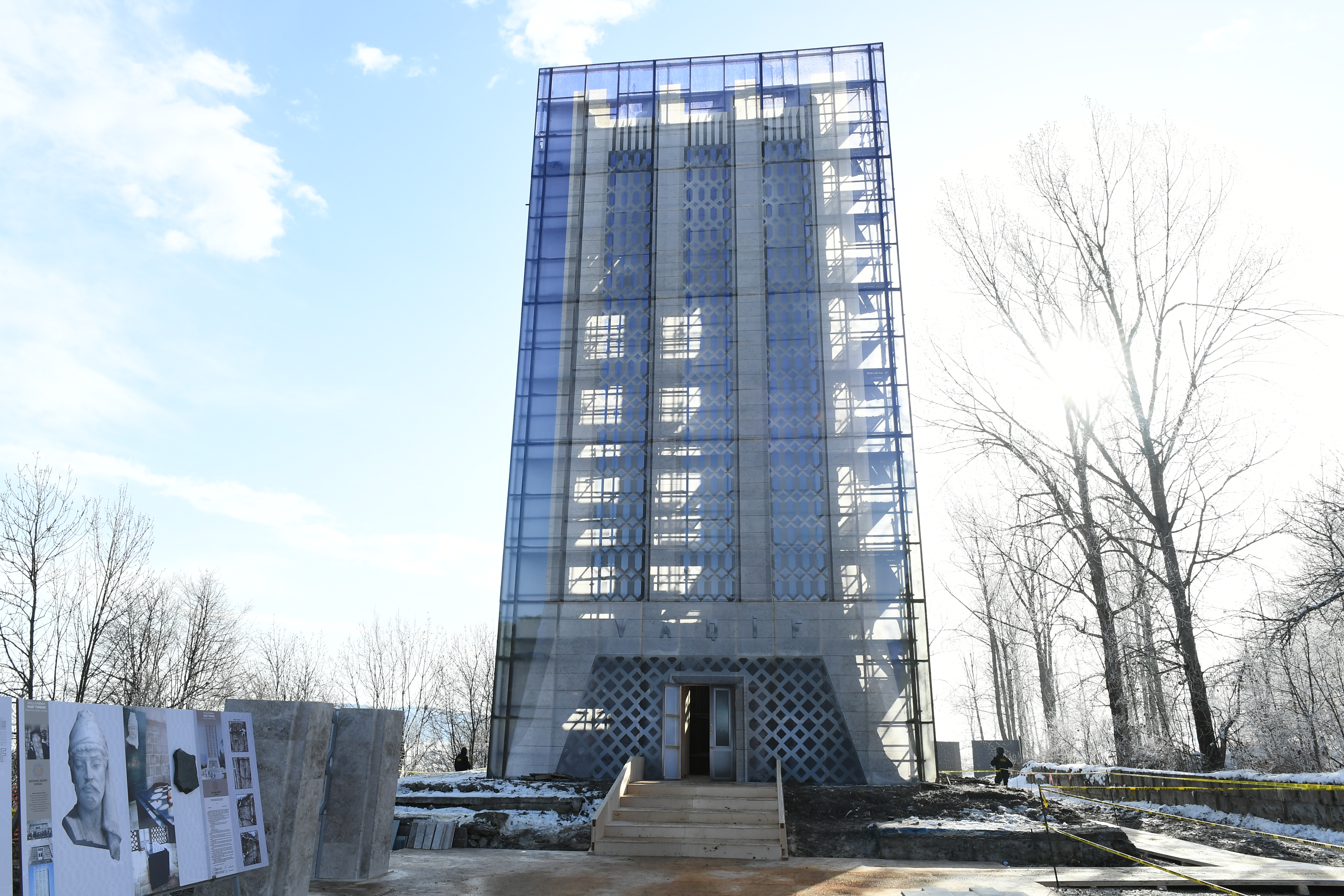
Mausoleum during renovation
