= Xanlıqlar, Qazax =

Village in Azerbaijan

Xanlıqlar
- Location within Azerbaijan
- Coordinates: 41°03′52″N 45°17′54″E
- Country: Azerbaijan
- Rayon: Qazakh
- Time zone: UTC+4 (AZT)
  - Summer (DST): UTC+5 (AZT)

Xanlıqlar (known as Musaköy in the Soviet times and until 1994) is a village in the Qazakh Rayon of Azerbaijan. It has a population of 5,751. Xanliqlar is a place in Azerbaijan about 245 mi (or 395 km) west of Baku, the country's capital city.

== Notable people ==
- Abdurrahman agha Dilbazoglu, Turkic poet
