= Mikayil Mirza =

Mikayil Mirza Mikayıl Mirzə
- Born: January 1, 1947; Talysh, Agsu District, Azerbaijan SSR, USSR
- Died: June 3, 2006 (aged 59)
- Resting place: II Alley of Honor
- Occupation(s): actor, screenwriter

Mikayil Shahveled oghlu Mirzayev (Azerbaijani: Mikayıl Şahvələd oğlu Mirzəyev, January 1, 1947 – June 3, 2006) was an Azerbaijani actor, screenwriter.

== Biography ==
Mikayil Mirza was born on January 1, 1947, in the village of Talysh. In 1969, he graduated from the Faculty of Drama and Film Acting of the Azerbaijan State Institute of Arts. From 1976 to 2000, he worked intermittently at the Azerbaijan State Academic National Drama Theatre.

He was elected as a deputy of the National Assembly for two terms, 1995–2000 and 2002–2005. In 1992–1995, he also worked as the director of Baku Cultural and Educational Technical College.

Mikayil Mirza died on June 3, 2006. He was buried in the II Alley of Honor.

== Awards ==
- Honored Artist of the Azerbaijan SSR — 1987
