= Talış, Agsu =

Talış
- Location within Azerbaijan
- Coordinates: 40°36′N 48°26′E
- Country: Azerbaijan
- Rayon: Agsu
- Time zone: UTC+4 (AZT)
  - Summer (DST): UTC+5 (AZT)

Talış (also, Talysh) is a village in the Agsu Rayon of Azerbaijan.
