= Ismikhan Rahimov =

- Born: 1925-09-18; Baku
- Died: 2004-12-15; Baku

Ismikhan Rahimov(September 18, 1925, Baku – December 15, 2004, Baku) — translator, linguist, and one of the founders of the anti-Soviet "Ildirim" (Lightning) organization.

Together with Haji Zeynalov and Gulhuseyn Huseynoglu, he founded a nationalist student organization against the Soviet occupation, and due to this activity, he was deprived of his voting rights for 5 years and sentenced to 25 years of imprisonment with the confiscation of all his property. He served his sentence in a labor camp in Siberia.

He completed secondary and higher education with distinction ahead of time. He had a unique methodology in teaching English. He was the author of several books and dictionaries in the field of linguistics. On October 28, 2000, he was awarded the "Shohrat" (Glory) Order for his services in the field of education in Azerbaijan. Since 2002, he had been a personal pensioner of the President of the Republic of Azerbaijan.

== Life ==
Ismikhan Mammad oglu Rahimov was born on September 18, 1925, in the city of Baku. His father, Shahverdiyev Alibanda, was a merchant and was arrested and executed by the Soviet regime in 1937. In 1931, he entered secondary school in Baku. He completed school one year earlier than expected with high grades. In 1941, he was admitted to the Institute of Foreign Languages, graduating with distinction in 1943. He then enrolled in the Faculty of Philology at Azerbaijan State University. During his studies there, he was also admitted to the Azerbaijan Medical Institute. In 1946, he graduated with distinction from the Faculty of Philology at Azerbaijan State University. Due to his admission to postgraduate studies, he discontinued his medical education.

In 1942, Ismikhan Rahimov, together with Haji Zeynalov and Gulhuseyn Huseynoglu, founded a secret nationalist student organization in Azerbaijan against the Soviet occupation. Later, Musa Abdullayev, Kamal Aliyev, Azer Alasgarov, Aydin Vahidov, and Kamil Rzayev also joined the organization. The organization consisted of eight university students in total. It had its own program and oath. The oath-taking ceremonies took place in early 1944 at Aydin Vahidov's apartment, with the oath text prepared by Ismikhan Rahimov. The main goals of the organization's members were the independence of Azerbaijan, the protection and expansion of the use of the Azerbaijani language, its establishment as the state language, and the opportunity for Azerbaijanis to hold high positions in state institutions. They also aimed to reassess the cases of writers who were arrested during the 1937–1938 period, labeled as enemies of the people, exiled to Siberia, or executed, and to achieve their rehabilitation.

At an event of the Azerbaijan Writers' Union held on May 10, 1944, Samad Vurgun criticized the union's work, stating that Azerbaijani literature was not developing as it should. He gave a speech about national literature, national consciousness, and national identity. Inspired by this, the members of the organization decided to write a letter to Samad Vurgun on May 11, proposing that he lead their organization as someone who could guide them. Ismikhan Rahimov, under the dictation of Gulhuseyn Huseynoglu, wrote the letter using a handwriting style resembling printed letters to avoid revealing the writer's identity. In the letter, they asked Samad Vurgun about the reasons why the Writers' Union had only 60 members, why the national rights of Azerbaijanis were not being ensured, and why scientific books were not being translated into Azerbaijani. They also declared that they had sworn to fight for the independence of the Azerbaijani people until the very end and expressed their support for Samad Vurgun. If he agreed with their views, they asked him to write a poem titled "Stars of the Motherland." There is no information on whether the letter ever reached Samad Vurgun. In 1946, the organization ceased its activities due to internal disagreements among its members.

After the letter fell into the hands of the NKVD, in 1945, dictations were conducted for students in all higher education institutions in Azerbaijan. Based on the handwriting, it was determined that the letter written to Samad Vurgun was penned by Ismikhan Rahimov. Later, he was monitored for a while. After gathering sufficient evidence, on September 26, 1948, Ismikhan Rahimov was arrested first, followed by Haji Zeynalov and the other six members. On the 21st and 22nd of March 1949, the Criminal Court Collegium of the Supreme Court of the Azerbaijan SSR delivered the verdict. Gulhuseyn Abdullayev, Ismikhan Rahimov, and Haji Zeynalov were sentenced to 25 years, while the other five were sentenced to 10 years in prison. Exiled to a labor correction camp in Siberia, Ismikhan Rahimov worked as a paramedic there. After Stalin's death, he was released in 1955 and was acquitted in 1956.

After returning to Baku, he resumed his education in postgraduate studies. In 1959, he defended his dissertation dedicated to the works of George Byron. He devoted the rest of his life entirely to teaching and science. He served as the head of the department and dean at the Azerbaijan State Institute of Foreign Languages. He created a methodology for quickly learning English. He was the author of several books and dictionaries in the field of linguistics. On October 28, 2000, Ismikhan Rahimov was awarded the "Shohrat" (Glory) Order for his services in the field of education in Azerbaijan. Since 2002, he had been a personal pensioner of the President of the Republic of Azerbaijan. He died on December 15, 2004, in Baku.

== Memory ==
Ziya Bunyadov was the first to write about the organization founded by Ismikhan Rahimov, 42 years later. He published a comprehensive article titled "Lightning" in the March 17–18, 1990 issue of the newspaper "Azerbaijan Youth", providing information about the organization's activities. In 1993, he expanded on this in his book *Red Terror*, offering more detailed information about the organization, including their interrogations, protocols, and other data.

In 2002, Asaf Guliyev directed a documentary titled "Lightning", and in 2003, Musallim Hasanov directed another documentary titled *Travelers of the Lightning Path*.

In 2017, a classroom was dedicated to Ismikhan Rahimov at the Azerbaijan University of Languages.

== Books ==
- English-Azerbaijani Dictionary**. Edited by Ismikhan Rahimov. Baku: Azerneshr, 1992. ISBN 5-552-00948-7
- Practical Grammar of the English Language: Explanations, Exercises, Answers to the Exercises** / I. Rahimov, T. Hidayatzade, S. Mir Jafarova. — Baku: Azerneshr, 2003. ISBN 5-552-00785-4
- Azerbaijani-English and English-Azerbaijani Dictionary**. Ismikhan Mammad oglu Rahimov, Baku, "Tafakkur" Publishing House, 2003–630 pages.
