= Kamal Mehdi Abdullayev =

Azerbaijani scholar, writer and public figure

Kamal Abdulla
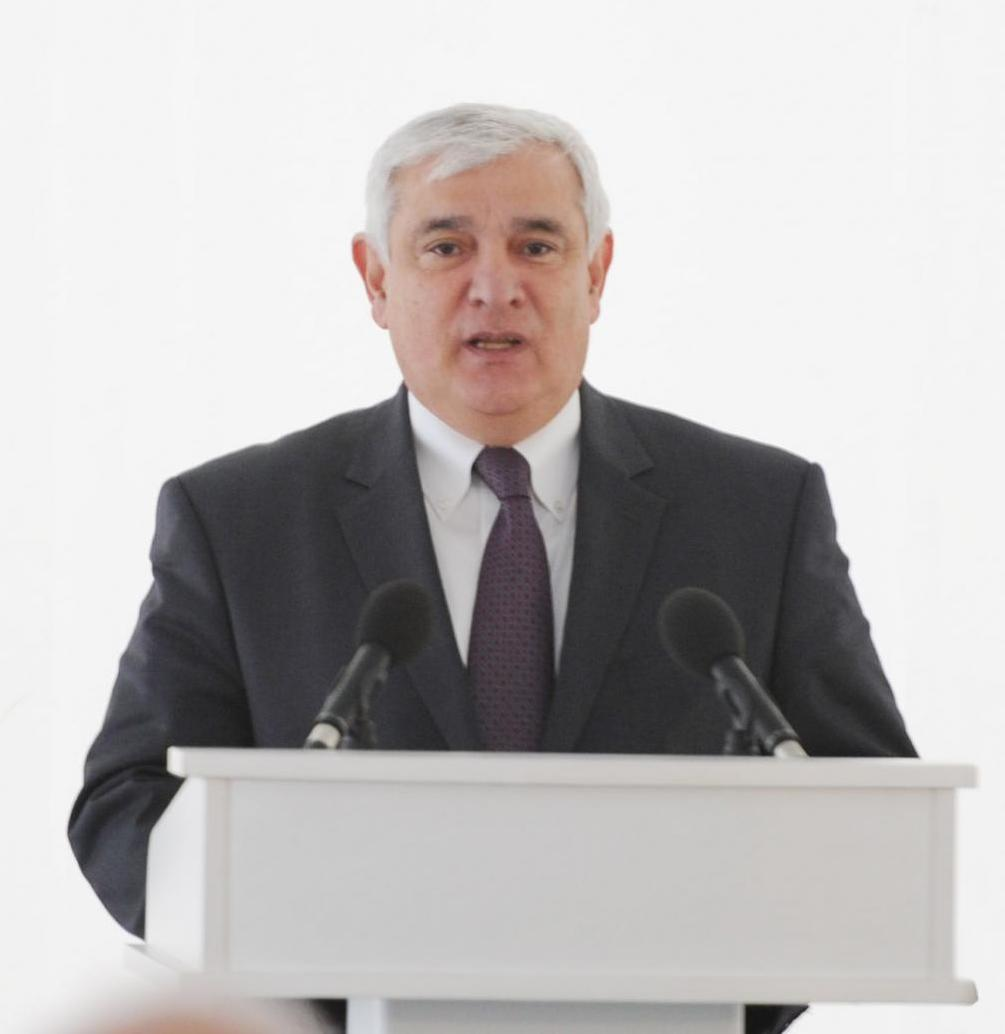
- Kamal Abdulla

Rector of Azerbaijan University of Languages
- Incumbent
- Assumed office 1 June 2017

Chairman of the Supervisory Board of Trustees Baku International Multiculturalism Centre
- Incumbent
- Assumed office 28 November 2014

State Advisor on Interethnic, Multiculturalism and Religious Affairs of the Republic of Azerbaijan
- In office 28 February 2014 – 1 June 2017

Rector of Baku Slavic University
- In office June 2000 – 28 February 2014
- Succeeded by: Asif Hajili

Personal details
- Born: Kamal Mehdi oğlu Abdullayev; 4 December 1950 (age 75) Baku, Azerbaijan SSR, USSR
- Awards
- Website: kamalabdulla.az

Kamal Abdulla (Kamal Mehdi oğlu Abdullayev; born 4 December 1950) — Azerbaijani scholar, writer, and public figure. Doctor of Philology, professor, People's Writer of the Republic of Azerbaijan (2019) and Honored Scientist (1999), full member of ANAS, First Class State Advisor.

He is the first rector of Baku Slavic University (2000–2014), State Advisor on Interethnic, Multiculturalism and Religious Affairs of the Republic of Azerbaijan (2014–2017), rector of Azerbaijan University of Languages, chairman of the Azerbaijan Cultural Foundation (Azerbaijan Creativity Foundation), honorary full member of the Turkish Language Association, full member (academician) of the Ukrainian International Personnel Academy, honorary doctor of Moscow City Pedagogical University, Ural Federal University and Pitești University in Romania, honorary professor of Poltava University of Economics and Trade, full member (academician) of the International Academy of Sciences of Turkic World Studies, full member of the Georgian Academy of Educational Sciences, and a member of the Russian PEN Club (Moscow). Honorary Doctor of the Chisinau Pedagogical University (Moldova), Honorary Doctor of the Kokand State Pedagogical Institute (Uzbekistan), Professor of Marmara University (Turkey).

== Biography ==
Kamal Abdulla (born Kamal Mehdi oğlu Abdullayev; 4 December 1950, Baku) is an Azerbaijani scholar, writer, and public figure. He holds the degrees of Doctor of Philology and professor, and is a full member of the Azerbaijan National Academy of Sciences (ANAS). He has been designated People's Writer of Azerbaijan (2019) and Honored Scientist of Azerbaijan (1999), and holds the rank of First Class State Advisor.

He served as the founding rector of Baku Slavic University (2000–2014), as State Advisor of the Republic of Azerbaijan on Interethnic Relations, Multiculturalism and Religious Affairs (2014–2017), and has served as rector of the Azerbaijan University of Languages since 2017. He is also chairman of the Azerbaijan Creativity Foundation and chairman of the Board of Trustees of the Baku International Multiculturalism Centre.

He is an honorary member of the Turkish Language Association, a full member (academician) of the Ukraine International Personnel Academy, an honorary doctor of Moscow City Pedagogical University, Ural Federal University, and Pitești University in Romania, and an honorary professor of Poltava University of Economics and Trade. He is a full member of the International Academy of Sciences of Turkic World Research, a full member of the Georgian Academy of Educational Sciences, and a member of the Russian PEN Club (Moscow).

== Early life and education ==
Kamal Abdulla was born on 4 December 1950 in Baku; his father was a teacher and his mother was a physician. He completed his secondary education at School No. 190 in Baku in 1968. Between 1968 and 1973, he studied at the Faculty of Philology of Baku State University.

From 1973 to 1976, he was a full-time postgraduate student in the Department of Turkic Languages at the Institute of Linguistics of the USSR Academy of Sciences. In January 1977, he defended his candidate dissertation, equivalent to PhD, titled: "Syntactic Parallelism" (on the language of the Book of Dede Korkut epics), in Moscow. In 1984, he defended his doctoral dissertation, "Theoretical Problems of Azerbaijani Language Syntax", in Baku.

From 1983 onward, he wrote and presented monthly and weekly literary and popular-science television programmes, including Azerbaijani Language, Qoshma, Define, and The Secret of the Word.

== Career ==
Between 1977 and 1984, Kamal Abdulla worked at the Nasimi Institute of Linguistics of the Azerbaijan SSR Academy of Sciences, holding positions of junior researcher, senior researcher, and head of the Department of Comparative Study of Turkic Languages.

From 1984 to 1987, he headed the Department of General and Azerbaijani Linguistics at the Institute of Foreign Languages. Between 1988 and 1990, he served as first deputy chairman of the Azerbaijan Culture Foundation (now the Azerbaijan Creativity Foundation), and from 1990 as chairman of its Board of Trustees.

In 1990, he was elected head of the Department of General and Russian Linguistics at the M. F. Akhundov Institute of Russian Language and Literature. From 1993 to 2000, he again headed the Department of General and Azerbaijani Linguistics at the Institute of Foreign Languages.

During 1994–1995, he held a professorship in the Department of Turkish Language and Literature at Uludağ University in Bursa, Turkey.

In May 2000, he was appointed rector of the M. F. Akhundov Institute of Russian Language and Literature. In June 2000, by decree of President Heydar Aliyev, he was appointed rector of the newly established Baku Slavic University, a post he held until February 2014.

Between 2011 and 2014, he also served as academic secretary of the Department of Humanities and Social Sciences of ANAS.

In February 2014, President Ilham Aliyev appointed him State Advisor of the Republic of Azerbaijan on Interethnic Relations, Multiculturalism and Religious Affairs. By presidential decree of 19 November 2014, he was appointed a member of the board of Trustees of the Baku International Multiculturalism Centre and at the Board of inaugural meeting on 28 November 2014, he was elected its chairman.

In 2015, he taught a course in Azerbaijanism at ADA University.

Since 2017, he has served as rector of the Azerbaijan University of Languages.

=== International academic activity ===
Kamal Abdulla has delivered lectures at Columbia University (Harriman Institute) in the United States, the Institut national des langues et civilisations orientales (INALCO) and the University of Strasbourg in France, the University of Mainz in Germany, Moscow State Linguistic University, the Pedagogical University, and the Institute of Linguistics in Russia, Uludağ University in Turkey, the University of Warsaw in Poland, Tbilisi State University in Georgia, and the Salesian Pontifical University in Italy. He has also organised and participated in numerous international symposia, conferences, and colloquia in Georgia, Russia, France, Germany, England, Sweden, Greece, Italy, and elsewhere.

== Publications ==
Kamal Abdulla is the author of approximately 300 articles, more than 20 textbooks and monographs.

=== Linguistics ===
- 1983 — Theoretical Problems of the Syntax of the Simple Sentence in Azerbaijani (Baku: Elm)
- 1999 — Theoretical Problems of Azerbaijani Syntax (Baku: Maarif)
- 2005 — The Russian Language in Azerbaijan (co-authored with Prof. Ilyas Hamidov) (Baku)
- 2010 — A Journey into Linguistics, or Linguistics for Non-Linguists (Baku)
- 2012 — Complex Syntactic Wholes in the Azerbaijani Language (co-authored with other linguists) (Baku)
- Let's Speak Azerbaijani (Paris, 2008; Bucharest, 2010; Budapest, 2011; Abu Dhabi, 2012)

=== Literary criticism and essays ===
- 1985 — Author – Work – Reader (Baku: Yazıçı)
- 1990 — First and Last Writings (Baku: Yazıçı)
- 1993 — The Beginning and End of the Road (Baku: Azerbaijan State Publishing House)
- 2007 — 300 Azerbaijanis (Baku: Mütərcim)
- 2011 — Moments (literary conversations between Abdulla, Salam Sarvan and Etimad Baskecid on Abdulla's work and broader issues of world literature and culture)

=== Gorgud studies ===
- 1991 — The Secret Dede Korkut (Baku: Yazıçı)
- 1999 — The Epic Within the Secret, or The Secret Dede Korkut – 2 (Baku: Elm)
- 2006 — Taynyy Dede Korkut [The Secret Dede Korkut] (Baku: Mütərcim)
- 2009 — From Myth to Writing, or The Secret Dede Korkut (Baku: Mütərcim)
- 1995 — Turkish translation Gizli Dede Korkut (Bursa: Ekin Basınevi; Istanbul: Ötüken Basınevi); retranslated as Mitten yazıya ve ya Gizli Dede Korkut (Istanbul: Ötüken Basınevi, 2013)
- 2017 — Introduction to the Poetics of the Book of Dede Korkut (Baku)
- 2026 — "Secret Dede Gorgud" – In Search of New Meanings

In 2021, a volume titled Azerbaijanism and the Book of Dede Korkut, based on lectures Kamal Abdulla delivered at ADA University, was published. The work examines the concepts of Azerbaijanism and the Azerbaijani identity, and traces the multicultural model of Azerbaijan in the Book of Dede Korkut epic.

=== Fictions ===
Kamal Abdulla's plays, stories, novels, essays, and poems have been published in Azerbaijan and abroad. His works have been translated into Turkish, Russian, Georgian, English, French, German, Spanish, Polish, Portuguese, Italian, Ukrainian, Finnish, Arabic, Japanese, Montenegrin, Lithuanian, Bulgarian, Kazakh, Kyrgyz, and other languages. His plays have been staged in Azerbaijan, Georgia, and Estonia.

==== The Incomplete Manuscript ====
Yarımçıq əlyazma (The Incomplete Manuscript) was first published in Baku in 2004. It subsequently appeared in French as Le Manuscrit inachevé (Paris: L'Harmattan, 2005; reprint 2013), in Turkish as Eksik El Yazması (Istanbul: Ötüken, 2006; reprint 2014), in Russian as Nepolnaya rukopis' (Moscow: Khroniker, 2006; reprinted in Romany, Moscow: Khudozhestvennaya literatura, 2013; and in Pod sen'yu Karagacha, Moscow: Khudozhestvennaya literatura, 2016), in Portuguese as O Manuscrito Inacabado (João Pessoa: Ideia, 2009), in Polish as Zagadkowy Rękopis (Toruń, 2009), in Arabic (Cairo, 2012), in English as The Incomplete Manuscript (Houston, 2013), in Kazakh (Astana, 2013), in German as Das unvollständige Manuscript (Vienna, 2013), in Kyrgyz (Bishkek, 2014), in Italian as Il Manoscritto Incompleto (Rome, 2014; Rome, 2015), in Montenegrin as Nepotpuni rukopis (Podgorica, 2015), and in Japanese (Tokyo: Suseisha, 2017).

==== Valley of the Sorcerers ====
Sehrbazlar dərəsi (Valley of the Sorcerers), a novel set in the world of Sufi dervishes, was first published in Baku in 2006 (second edition: Baku: Qanun, 2018). It appeared in Turkish as Büyücüler deresi (Turkey, 2010), in Russian as Dolina Kudesnikov (Moscow, 2010; reprinted in Romany, Moscow: Khudozhestvennaya literatura, 2013; and in Pod sen'yu Karagacha, Moscow: Khudozhestvennaya literatura, 2016), in Lithuanian as Stebukladarių slėnis (Lithuania, 2013), in Kazakh (Kazakhstan, 2013), in French as La vallée des magiciens (France, 2013), in Japanese (Japan, 2013), in Persian (Iran, 2014), in English as Valley of the Sorcerers (United States, 2015), in Italian as La valle dei maghi (Rome: Sandro Teti Editore, 2016), and in Romanian as Câmpia Vrăjitorilor (Cluj-Napoca: Princeps Multimedia, 2019).

==== No One to Forget ====
Unutmağa kimsə yox… (No One to Forget) was published in Baku in 2011 (second edition: Baku: Qanun, 2018). A Russian translation, I nekogo zabyt'…, appeared in Baku in 2015 (Qanun), and was reprinted in Pod sen'yu Karagacha (Moscow: Khudozhestvennaya literatura, 2016). A Turkish edition appeared under the title Unutmağa kimse yok.

==== Diary Without Dates ====
Tarixsiz gündəlik (Diary Without Dates), drawing on the author's school years, was published in Baku in 2005. A Russian translation, Dnevnik s zametkami na polyakh, appeared in the anthology Otkryvaya drug druga in 2007, and a Bulgarian translation appeared the same year in the anthology Edin kăm drug.

==== Laokoon… Laokoon ====
Laokoon… Laokoon was published in Germany by PEM Verlag and made available through Amazon and Thalia.

=== Other works ===
Collections of drama, poetry, and short fiction include: Unutmağa kimsə yox (Baku: Azərnəşr, 1995), Ruh (Baku: Azərnəşr, 1997), Bir, iki, bizimki! (Baku: Mütərcim, 2003), Casus (Baku: Mütərcim, 2004), Ruh (Ankara, 2006), Vse moi pechali (Baku: Mütərcim, 2009). Poetry collections include Qəribədi, deyilmi?! (Baku: BSU Press, 1998) and Nar çiçəkləri (Baku: Mütərcim, 2014). The essay, poetry, and fiction collection Kədərli seçmələr appeared in 2002 (Baku: Mütərcim). The short story collections Hekayələr (Baku: Mütərcim, 2009), Labirint (2012), Sirri-zəmanə (2014), and Platon, deyəsən, xəstələnib… (Moscow, 2014) were followed by Edam vaxtını dəyişmək olmaz (2017) and Platon se izgleda razboleo… (Belgrade: Verzal D.o.o, 2018). A collection of poems and plays, Gospodin dorogi, was published in Moscow (Rif Roy, 2004).

== Awards and honours ==
- December 1999 – Honored Scientist of Azerbaijan, awarded by President Heydar Aliyev for services to the study of the Book of Dede Korkut
- 2007 – Pushkin Medal of the Russian Federation
- 2007 – Humay Award, Azerbaijan
- 2007 – "Novel of the Year" award, 525 Newspaper
- 2007 – "Literary Person of the Year", Monitoring Group
- 2009 – Karel Kramář Medal, for contributions to Azerbaijani-Czech relations
- 2009 – Knight's Cross (Order of Merit of the Republic of Poland), awarded by President Lech Kaczyński
- 2009 – Special Diploma of the Ministry of Foreign Affairs of Poland, for contributions to Poland's international image
- 2010 – Dede Korkut National Prize, Dede Korkut National Foundation; Gold Medal "Son of the Fatherland", Azerbaijan World international journal
- 2010 – "Literary Work of the Last Decade" prize at the 3rd Nasimi National Literature Competition, for The Incomplete Manuscript
- May 2015 – Award for scientific achievement, 5th Congress of the Union of Caucasus Universities (KUNİB), Tabriz, Iran
- September 2015 – Special literary prize of the Scanno Prize (Riccardo Tanturri Foundation, Italy), for The Incomplete Manuscript
- 3 December 2015 – Shohrat Order, by decree of the President of Azerbaijan, for effective activity in the field of education
- March 2016 – Golden Delvig Prize (Russia), for the short story collection Platon, deyəsən, xəstələnib… (published by Khudozhestvennaya literatura, Moscow)
- 2017 – Award for contributions to the development of multiculturalism in Europe, Regional Agency / Euromanager journal
- 24 May 2019 – People's Writer of Azerbaijan, by decree of President Ilham Aliyev
- 10 July 2019 – Jubilee Medal "100th Anniversary of the Azerbaijan Democratic Republic (1918–2018)", by decree of President Ilham Aliyev
- 19 July 2019 – Jubilee Medal "100th Anniversary of the Azerbaijani Diplomatic Service (1919–2019)", by order of the Ministry of Foreign Affairs
- 13 September 2019 – Officer's Cross of the Order of Merit of Hungary, awarded by President János Áder, for contributions to Azerbaijani-Hungarian scientific and cultural relations
- Honorary Blue Ribbon Insignia, Sofia University
- 30 December 2020 – Sharaf Order (Order of Honour), by decree of President Ilham Aliyev, for services to science and education in Azerbaijan
- 14 December 2021 – "Living Dede Korkut" Prize, established by the Turkish Literature Foundation
- 4 June 2022 – Medal of Honour, International Organization of Turkic Culture (TÜRKSOY), Ankara

== Gallery ==
With Italian publisher Sandro Teti.

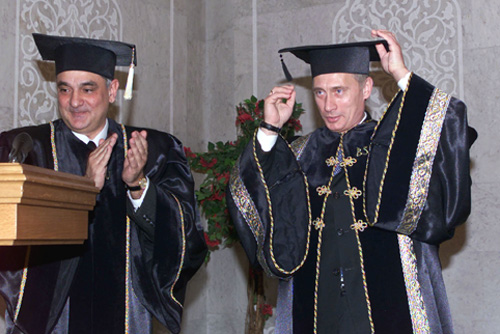
Ceremony of awarding the title of Honorary Doctor of Baku Slavic University to Russian President Vladimir Putin

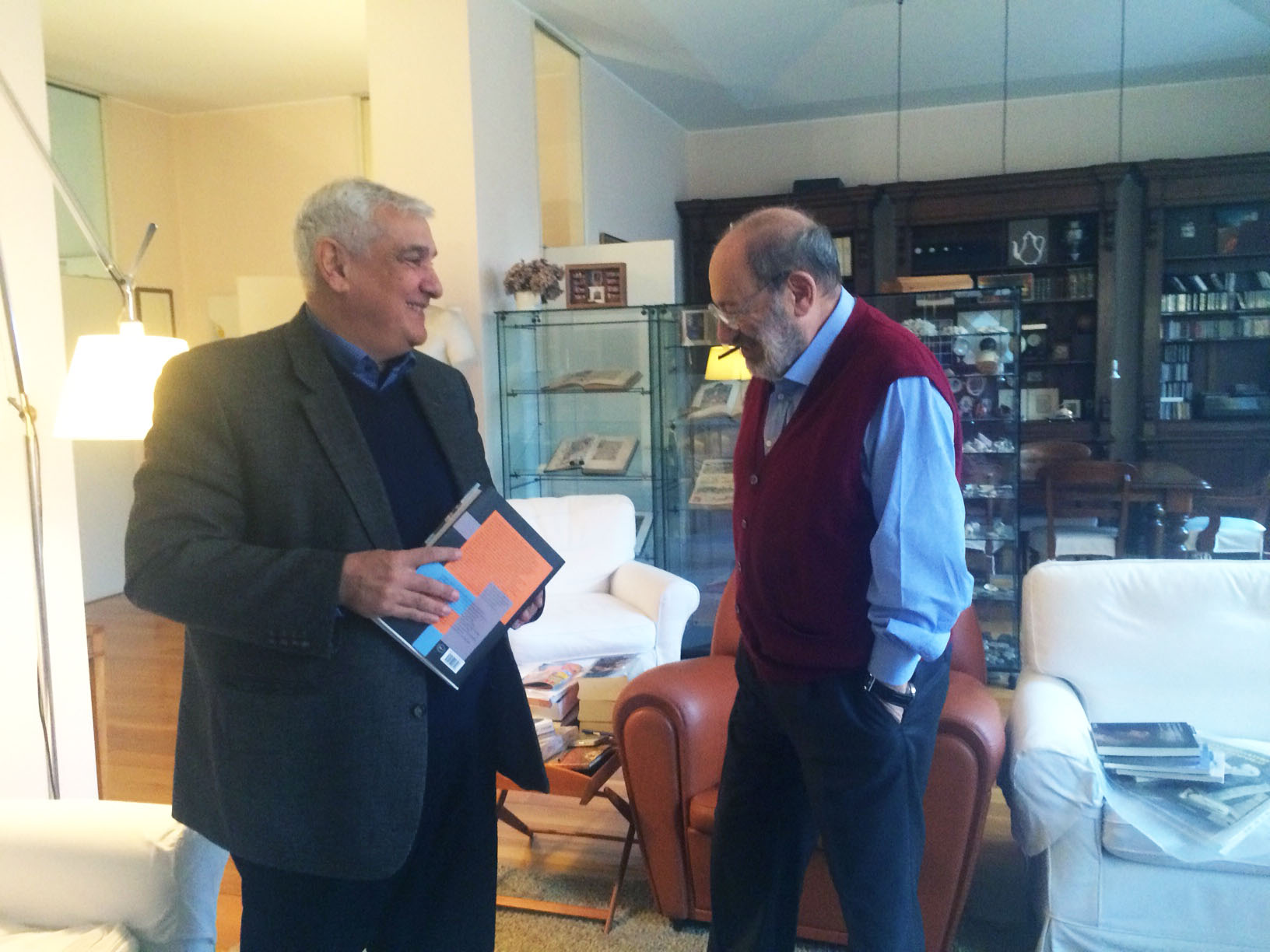
With Umberto Eco

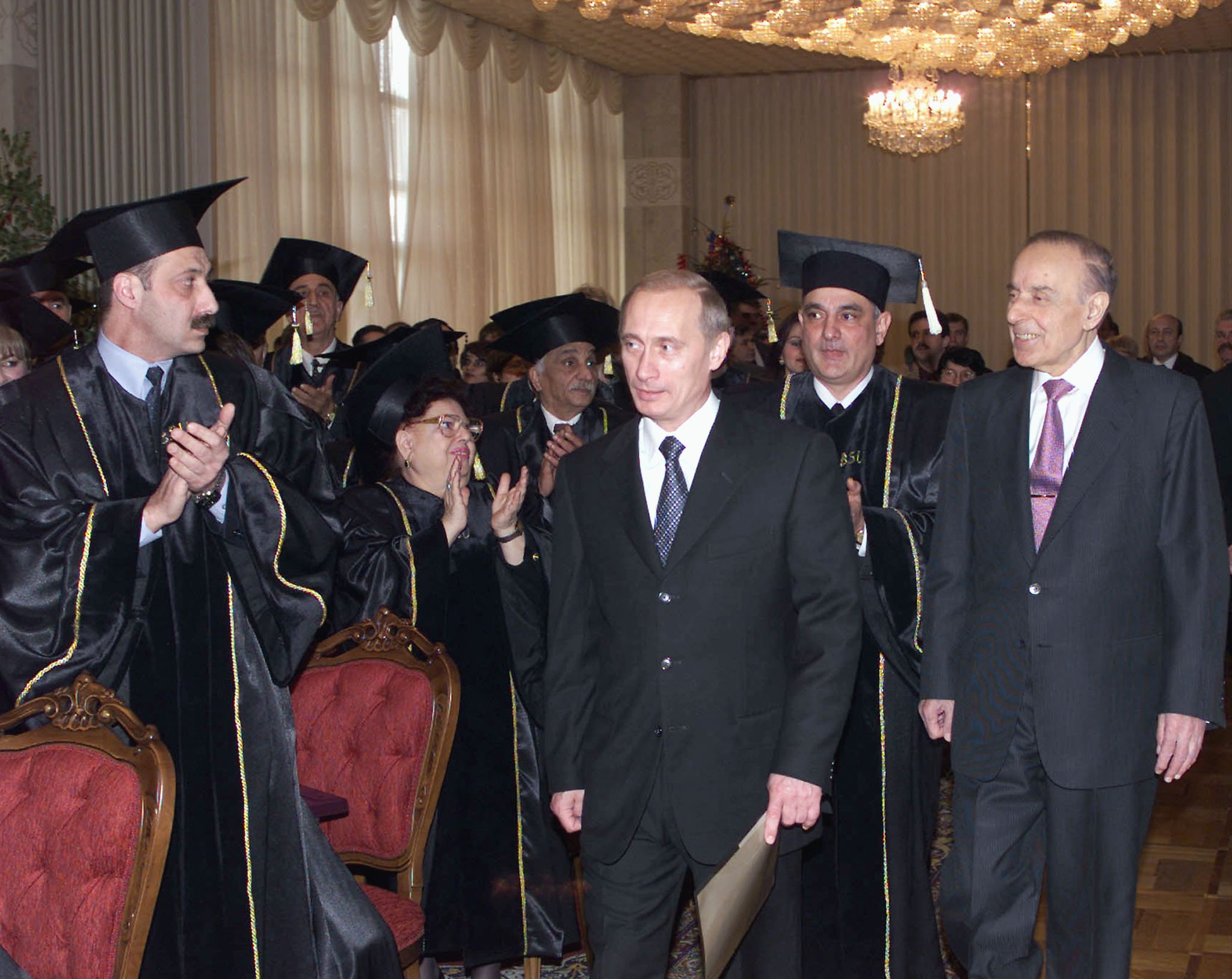
With President of the Republic of Azerbaijan Heydar Aliyev and Russian President Vladimir Putin

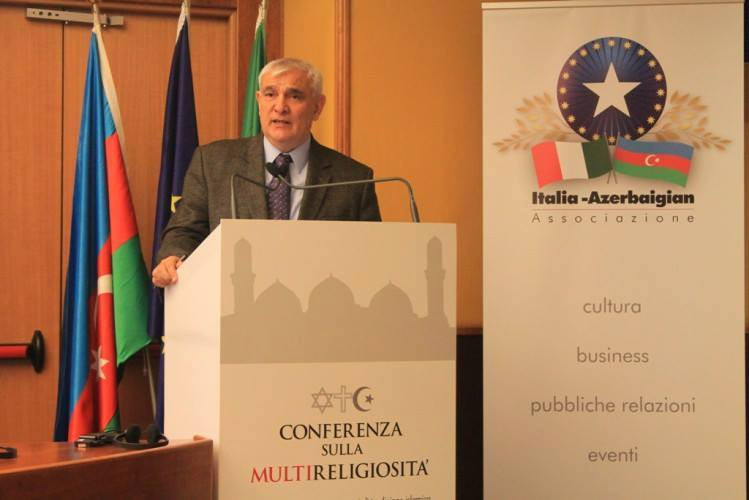
On Italian television
