= Mollaoba =

Coordinates: 38°56′09″N 48°41′57″E

Mollaoba is a village and municipality in the Masally District of Azerbaijan. It has a population of 2,576.
