= Molla Panah Vagif =

Azerbaijani poet and statesman

- Molla Pənah Vaqif
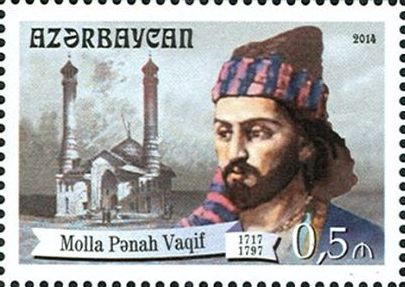
- Azerbaijani stamp with Molla Panah Vagif

Vizier of Karabakh Khanate
- In office 1769–1797
- Appointed by: Ibrahim Khalil Khan
- Succeeded by: Mirza Jamal Javanshir

Personal details
- Born: 1717 Yukhary Salahly, Kazakh sultanate
- Died: 1797 (aged 79–80) Shusha, Karabakh Khanate
- Resting place: Vagif Mausoleum
- Occupation: Poet

Molla Panah (Azerbaijani: Molla Pənah), better known by his pen-name Vagif (Arabic: واقِف, lit. 'The Learned One'), was an 18th-century Azerbaijani poet, statesman and diplomat. He is regarded as the founder of the realism genre and the modern school in Azerbaijani poetry. He served as the vizier—the minister of foreign affairs—of the Karabakh Khanate during the reign of Ibrahim Khalil Khan.

== Early life ==
It is mostly accepted by researchers that Molla Panah was born in 1717, in the village of Salahly, Kazakh Sultanate. However, some authors like Firudin bey Kocharli considered Hasansu as his birthplace, while Salman Mumtaz argued that he was actually born in 1733. His parents were Mehdi agha and Aghqiz khanum, who sent him to study under local cleric Shafi Effendi to study Arabic and Persian. His family had to move to the Karabakh Khanate in 1759 following conflict between the Kazakh Sultanate and the Kingdom of Georgia.

== Life in Karabakh ==
Molla Panah Vagif eventually moved to Shusha, capital of the Karabakh Khanate, and founded his madrasa in the Saatli neighborhood of the town, serving 17 families. In 1769, he was invited to the court of ruler Ibrahim Khalil Khan, who had heard of Panah's ability to predict the time of the lunar eclipse, and was appointed eshik aghasi (person in charge of foreign affairs) of the khanate after conversion to Shiism from Sunni Islam. He was described by authors such Mirza Jamal Qarabaghi as "A cautious and perfect vizier who found great fame in Iran and Rum" and by Mir Mehdi Khazani as the most trusted officer of Ibrahim Khan.

He served in this position for 27 years. It is said that he played an important role in the political and social life of the khanate. He took part in the development and planning of Shusha, played an important role in establishing political relations between the khanate and Georgia and Russia. In this context, he went to Tbilisi several times, where he befriended Prince Iulon of Georgia and dedicated a mukhammas to him. The correspondence with Russia was initiated by Vagif and these letters were sent to the Catherine II.

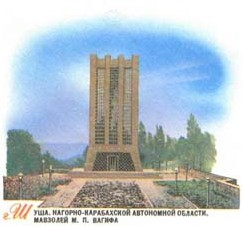
Vagif's mausoleum in Shusha before the occupation of the town by Armenian forces

As vizier, Vagif did much for the prosperity and political growth of the Karabakh Khanate. He also played an important role in organizing the defence of Shusha during the incursions of Agha Mohammad Shah Qajar of Persia in 1795 and 1797. He unsuccessfully tried to cement an alliance between Karabakh, Georgia, the Erivan Khanate and the Talysh Khanate against Qajar Iran.

=== Siege of 1795 ===
The historian Mirza Adigozal bey records the following possibly apocryphal tale: during the 1795 siege of Shusha, which resisted stubbornly despite the overwhelming numbers of Agha Mohammad's army, the shah had the following couplet by Urfi, the Persian-Indian poet, attached to an arrow and shot behind the walls of the city:

زمنجنیق فلک سنگ فتنه می بارد
تو ابلهانه گریزی به آبگینه حصار؟

Translation:

Lunatic! A hail of stones descend from the Catapult of heavens,
while you await wonders in walls of glass?

The shah was playing on the similarity between the name Shusha and the Persian (and Azeri) word for "glass". When the message was delivered to Ibrahim Khalil Khan, the ruler of Shusha, he called upon Vagif, his vizier, who immediately wrote the following response on the reverse of the message:

گرنگهدار من آنست که من می دانم
شیشه را در بغل سنگ نگه میدارد

Translation:

If my protector is the one that I know,
[he] would protect the glass alongside the most solid stone.

Receiving the letter with this poem, the shah went into a rage and renewed the cannon attack on Shusha. However, after 33 days, the shah lifted the siege and headed to Georgia.

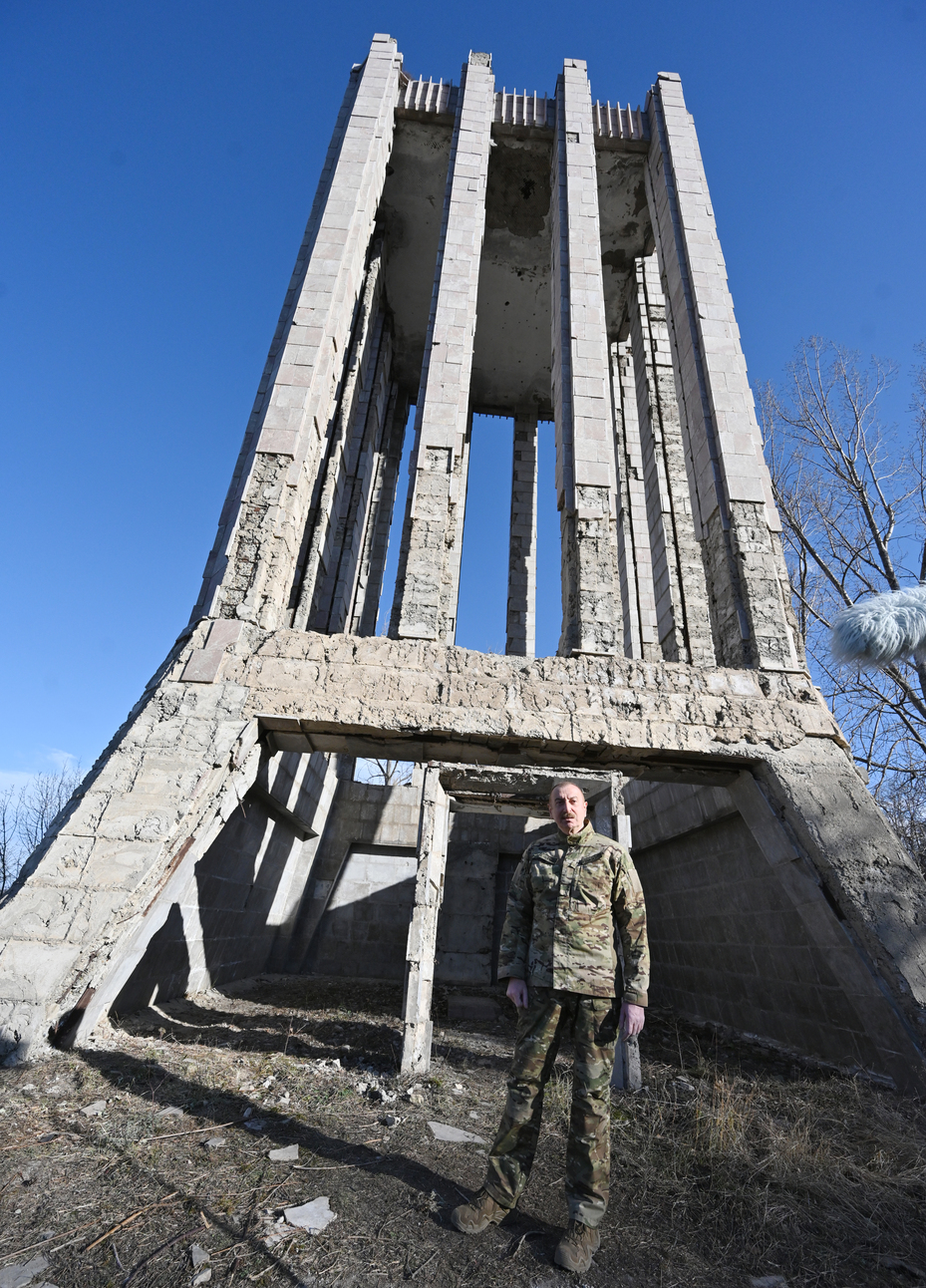
Azerbaijani President Ilham Aliyev in front of ruined mausoleum

=== Conquest of Shusha and Death ===
Agha Mohammad Shah invaded Karabakh a second time in 1797, after the Russian armies that briefly occupied the Caucasus withdrew upon the death of Catherine II. This time, Karabakh was undergoing a drought and was incapable of resisting. Ibrahim Khalil Khan escaped Shusha and the city fell quickly. Vagif was imprisoned and awaited death the following morning but was saved when the shah was assassinated that very night under mysterious circumstances.

The reprieve did not last long. The son of Mehrali bey Javanshir (brother of Ibrahim Khan), Muhammed bey Javanshir, who regarded himself as rightful heir to the throne, moved to take advantage of the power vacuum after the now shah-less Persian army returned to Iran. Seeing in Vagif a loyal follower of his uncle, he had Vagif and his son Ali executed. Vagif's house was also plundered and many of his verses were lost.

Vagif's remains were kept in Shusha, where a mausoleum in his name was built during the Soviet era in the 1970s. This mausoleum was destroyed in 1992 during the First Nagorno-Karabakh War. The fate of Vagif's remains is unknown. Another museum was opened on 20 November 1970 in Qazakh.

== Poetry ==
Despite the circumstances of his death, Vagif's poetry has persevered. His verses were collected for the first time in 1856 and published by Armenian writer Mirza Yusif Nersesov in Temir-Khan Shura with a fellow Armenian poet Mirzajan Madatov. Soon afterwards, his verses were published by Adolf Berge in Leipzig in 1867 with the assistance of Fatali Akhundov, a prominent 19th-century Azerbaijani playwright.

Vagif's works herald a new era in Azerbaijani poetry, treating more mundane feelings and desires rather than the abstract and religious themes prevalent in the Sufi-leaning poetry of the time. This was the main characteristic that distinguished Vagif from his predecessors and made him the founder of the realism genre in Azerbaijani poetry.

The language of Vagif's poems was qualitatively innovative as well: vivid, simple, and closely approaching the Azerbaijani vernacular. Vagif's poems have had a great influence on Azerbaijani folklore and many of them are repeatedly used in the folk music of ashiks (wandering minstrels).

An example:

Bayram oldu, heç bilmirəm neyləyim
Bizim evdə dolu çuval da yoxdur
Dügiylə yağ hamı çoxdan tükənmiş
Ət heç ələ düşməz, motal da yoxdur

Bizim bu dünyada nə malımız var
Nə də evdə sahibcamalımız da var
Vaqif, öyünmə ki, kamalımız var
Allaha şükür ki, kamal da yoxdur

Translation:

It is a holiday, don't know what to do
All sacks are empty in the household of ours
Rice long gone, butter exhausted too
No meat we have, nor cheese that's ours

In this world, we own nothing that's ours
Nor does happiness grace our homes
Vagif, don't pin your hopes on brains of ours
Glory to God, our brains somewhere roam
