= Azerbaijan University of Languages =

University in Azerbaijan

- Azərbaycan Dillər Universiteti
- Type: Public
- Established: 9 October 1937; 88 years ago
- Rector: Kamal Mehdi Abdullayev
- Academic staff: 700
- Students: 4,900
- Undergraduates: 4,000
- Postgraduates: 900
- Location: 134 Rashid Behbudov St., Baku, Azerbaijan; 40.395141°N 49.860335°E
- Campus: Urban
- Website: adu.edu.az/en/

Azerbaijan University of Languages (Azerbaijani: Azərbaycan Dillər Universiteti) is a public university in Baku, Azerbaijan. The student body consists of approximately 4,000 undergraduates and 900 graduate (master's degree) students. The university has a combined faculty of more than 700 teachers.

Azerbaijan University of Languages is the first higher education institution that has implemented the flexible credit system that meets the requirements of the Bologna process, International Quality Assurance standards and the European Credit Transfer System (ECTS) in Azerbaijan since 2005. At the same time, the Azerbaijan University of Languages is one of the first universities to have the status of a public legal entity under the Ministry of Education of the Republic of Azerbaijan since 2017.

== History ==
The beginnings of the university can be traced to 1937, with Azerbaijan Pedagogical Institute's opening of the School of Foreign Languages. In 1940, the Azerbaijan Communist Party decreed that a separate Institute of Foreign Languages be formed, but the outbreak of World War II caused the new institute to quickly fold back into the Azerbaijan Pedagogical Institute. After the war, the government of Azerbaijan SSR created the Azerbaijan Institute of Foreign Languages in 1948, but it was folded into the Azerbaijan Institute of Russian Language and Literature in 1959. Finally, in 1973, the Azerbaijan Pedagogical Institute of Foreign Languages was established as an independent institution. In 1996, the school was renamed the Azerbaijan State Institute of Languages. In 2000, the institute was given university status and renamed as the Azerbaijan University of Languages.

The university maintains close relations with UNESCO, operating a UNESCO Translation Department as well as hosting a UNESCO-sponsored faculty chair. There are 7 schools, and 25 departments at the university, with many scientific centers and laboratories active there.

As a result of the educational reforms, Azerbaijan University of Languages has been the first university which transmitted the whole system to credit system. The university has cooperation with higher educational institutions of Turkey, the U.S., the United Kingdom, France and other European institutions. Student exchanges have been intensive thanks to those cooperations.

== Events ==
- A series of events dedicated to the Khojaly Massacre were held at AUL by the Faculty of International Relations and Management and the Faculty of Translation and Cultural Studies.
- The Rector of AUL met with a delegation of Indonesia on December 17, 2018. The delegations of both sides signed a memorandum of cooperation.

== Structure ==
The structure of the university consists of the following:

- Rector
- Prorectors/vice-rectors
  - for academic affairs
  - for scientific affairs
  - for international relations
  - for developmental affairs
  - for general affairs
- Rector's advisors
  - for issues of scientific and educational affairs
  - for issues of multiculturalism
  - for the logistics and financial issues
  - for the control of execution
  - for social affairs

== Departments of university ==
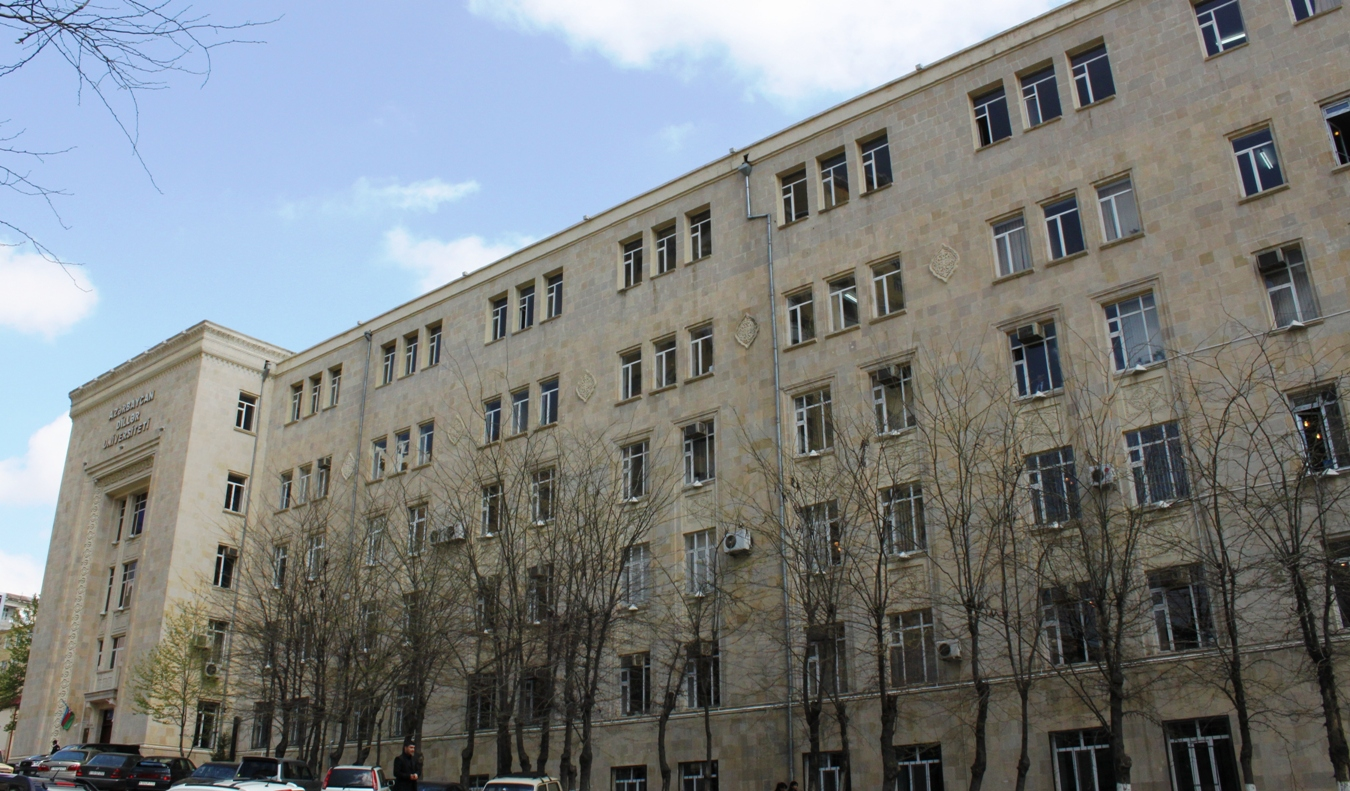
Azerbaijan University of Languages

- School of International Relations and Regional Studies
- School of Philology and Journalism
- School of Translation
- School of Further Education

== Faculties and institutes ==
1. Philology (English Language and Literature)
2. Philology (German Language and Literature)
3. Philology (French Language and Literature)
4. Philology (Turkish Language and Literature)
5. Teaching Azerbaijani Language and Literature
6. Foreign Language Teaching (English)
7. Foreign Language Teaching (German)
8. Foreign Language Teaching (French)
9. Teaching Language and Literature (German)
10. Teaching Language and Literature (French)
11. Teaching Language and Literature (English)
12. Primary School Teaching
13. Preschool Education
14. Social-Psychological Services in Education
15. Translation (Azerbaijani-English, English-Russian)
16. Translation (German)
17. Translation (French)
18. Translation (Russian-English)
19. Translation (Russian-Spanish)
20. Translation (English-Azerbaijani, English-German, English-French)
21. Translation (Azerbaijani-English)
22. Translation (Azerbaijani-Ukrainian)
23. Translation (Azerbaijani-Czech)
24. Translation (English)
25. Translation (Arabic)
26. Translation (Azerbaijani-Korean)
27. Translation (Azerbaijani-Spanish)
28. Translation (Azerbaijani-Italian)
29. Translation (English-Azerbaijani)
30. Regional Studies (United Kingdom)
31. Regional Studies (USA)
32. Regional Studies (South America)
33. Regional Studies (Africa)
34. Regional Studies (Israel)
35. Regional Studies (China)
36. Regional Studies (Arab Countries)
37. Regional Studies (Turkey)
38. Regional Studies (Pakistan)
39. Regional Studies (Germany)
40. Regional Studies (France)
41. Regional Studies (Israel and the Middle East)
42. Regional Studies (Southeast Asia and Indonesia)
43. Regional Studies (Russia)
44. Regional Studies (Caucasus Countries)
45. Regional Studies (Japan)
46. Regional Studies (Central and Eastern Europe)
47. International Relations

== Notable graduates ==
- Ismikhan Rahimov - translator, linguist, and one of the founders of the anti-Soviet "Ildirim" organization.
- Novruz Mammadov – 9th prime minister of Azerbaijan
- Azad Rahimov – Minister of Youth and Sports of Azerbaijan
- Abulfas Garayev – Minister of Culture and Tourism of Azerbaijan
- Valeh Hajilar - Academic of Tbilisi State Pedagogical University and National Academy of Sciences of Georgia, professor
- Garry Kasparov – Chess grandmaster
- Aysel Teymurzadeh – Singer
- Vagif Sadigov – Azerbaijani ambassador to the United Nations
