= Qazax =

Gazakh
- City & Municipality
- Azerbaijani: Qazax
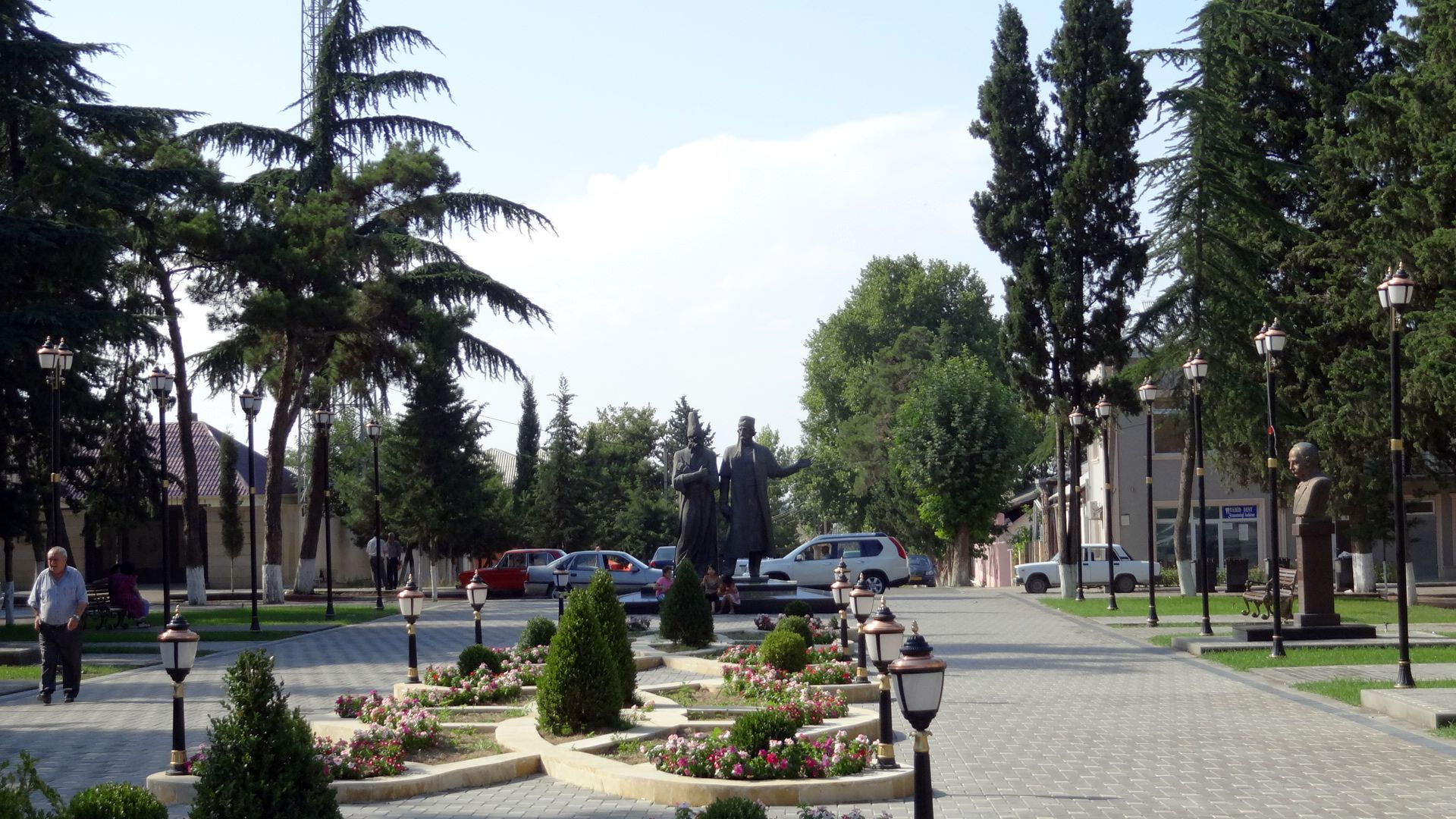

- Location within Azerbaijan
- Coordinates: 41°05′36″N 45°21′58″E
- Country: Azerbaijan
- District: Gazakh
- Established: 1909

Area
  - Total: 10 km^{2} (3.9 sq mi)
- Elevation: 381 m (1,250 ft)

Population (2014)
  - Total: 35,102
  - Density: 3,500/km^{2} (9,100/sq mi)
- Time zone: UTC+4 (AZT)
- Area code: +994 2229

Qazax (Gazakh;) is a city in and the capital of the Gazakh District of Azerbaijan. It has a population of 20,900. Gazakh is a city and administrative district in the west of Azerbaijan, the "western gate" of Azerbaijan.

== History ==
=== Early history ===
In the 17–18th century, Gazakh was the capital of the Kazakh Sultanate. During the Russian Empire, the city was the administrative center of the Kazakh uezd of the Elizavetpol Governorate. It is situated 10 km from the Aghstafa station of the Transcaucasus Railway.

=== Conflicts and disputes with Armenia ===
From 1905 to 1906, during the Armenian–Tatar massacres, many Armenian homes were burned and looted by Tatars (later known as Azerbaijanis), as well as the Armenian school and church. Many Armenian inhabitants as a result fled to Tbilisi and other nearby Armenian-populated areas.

From an Armenian perspective, these territories were historical Armenian provinces—which had been, factually, incorporated in various Armenian states—and therefore, the Gazakh region was initially contested between the Armenian and Azerbaijani SSRs. The Armenian name for the city is Ghazakh (Armenian: Ղազախ, romanized: Ġazax), and it is based on the Azerbaijani name itself. Another Armenian name is Koght (Կողթ).

When the South Caucasus came under British occupation, Sir John Oliver Wardrop, British Chief Commissioner in the South Caucasus, decided that assigning the Erivan Governorate and the Kars Oblast to Democratic Republic of Armenia (DRA) and the Elizavetpol and Baku Governorates to the Azerbaijan Democratic Republic (ADR) would solve the region's outstanding disputes. However, this proposal was rejected by both Armenians (who did not wish to give up their claims to Gazakh, Syunik, and Nagorno-Karabakh) and Azerbaijanis (who did not wish to give up their claims to Nakhchivan). As conflict broke out between the two groups, the British left the region in mid-1919.

In 1930, Gazakh became the administrative center of Azerbaijan's Gazakh District. The area has major strategic importance for modern-day Azerbaijan-Georgia-Turkey regional communication and energy projects.

=== Modern history ===
During the First Nagorno-Karabakh War, Armenian troops took control of several villages of the Gazakh district. Several Azerbaijani inhabitants were killed during the war whilst others were able to flee.

In July 2020, Gazakh became a site for clashes with Armenia.

== Demographics ==
According to the 1897 Russian Empire census, Gazakh had a population of 1,769—the linguistic composition was as follows: 802 (45.3%) Armenian, 601 (34.0%) Tatar (later known as Azerbaijani), 251 Russian, Ukrainian, and Belarusian, 60 (3.4%) Georgian, 19 (1.1%) Greek, 11 (0.6%) Polish, and 23 (1.3%) other language speakers.

According to the Caucasian Calendar, the population of the city in 1907 was 732 people, primarily Armenians with Tatars (later known as Azerbaijanis) as a minority, and by 1910, the population was 1,050 people. According to the 1912 publication, the city had an Armenian plurality.

According to the 1926 census of the USSR, 6,767 people lived in the city.

In 1970, the city was home to about 13,000 people, in 1991, that number was about 19,300 people.

By 2013, there were about 21,000 people living in Gazakh (10,200 men and 10,800 women).

The main occupations of the population are carpet making and horse breeding (specifically the Deliboz breed).

The total population of the district is 98932 people as of 01.01.2021

== Economy ==
The economy of Gazakh is partially agricultural, partially tourism-based, with some industries in operation.

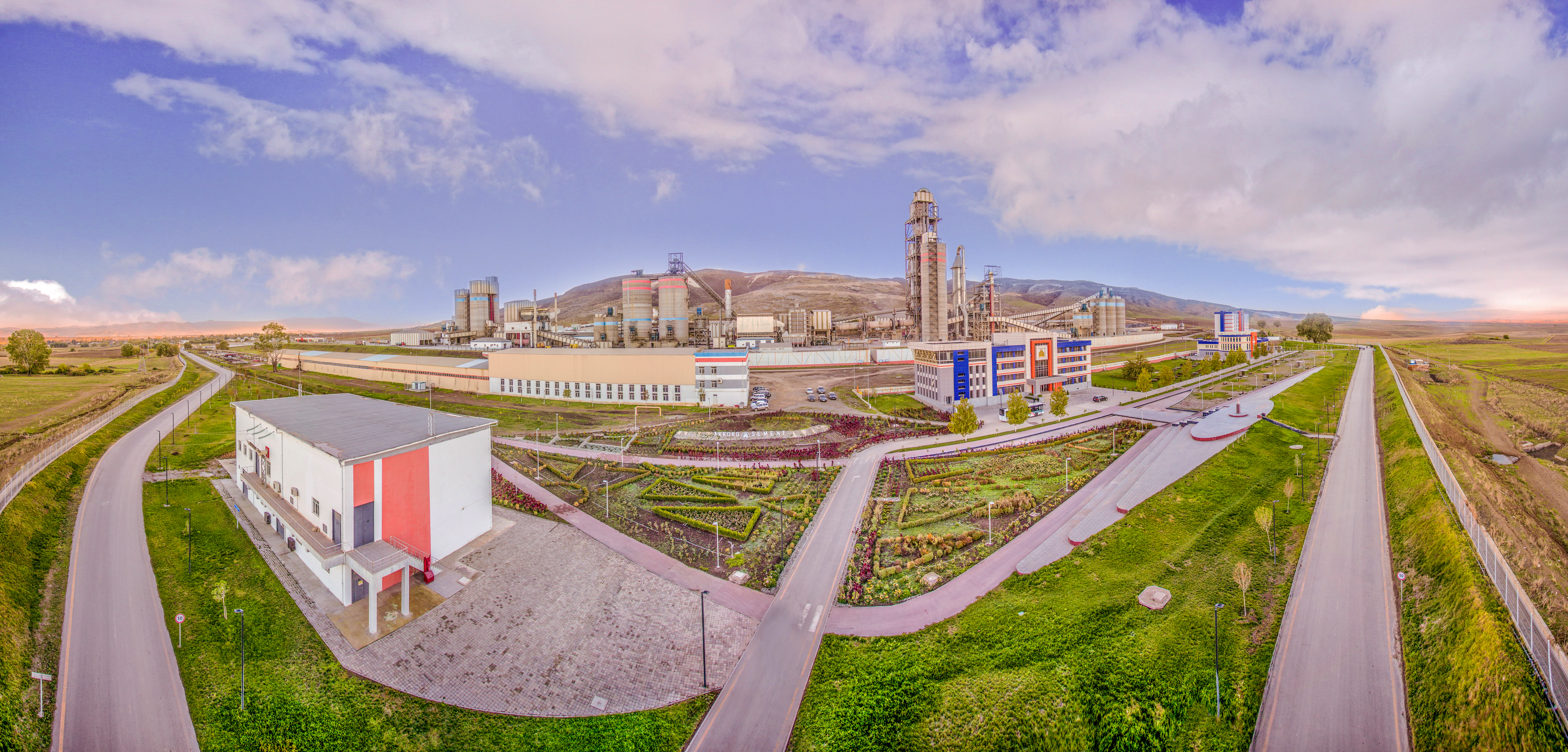
Gazakh Cement Plant

The Gazakh Cement Plant is served by a railway branch off the BTK railway at Aghstafa.

== Location ==
Gazakh region is located in the west of Azerbaijan. It borders with Georgia for 9 km and with Armenia for 168 km.

Gazakh region is located in the western part of the republic, in the western part of the vast Ganja-Gazakh plain, which starts from the slopes of the mountain range of the Lesser Caucasus and extends along the right bank of the Kura river. The highest elevation is "Odun" mountain (1316 meters). Its nature is mainly plain, the southern part is low mountainous.

== Culture ==
A memorial museum dedicated to Molla Panah Vagif and Molla Vali Vidadi is located in the city.

=== Sports ===
The city has one professional football team, Goyazan Gazakh, currently competing in the second-flight of Azerbaijani football, the Azerbaijan First Division.

== Transport ==
June 15, 2025 Azerbaijan – Baku-Agstafa route of Azerbaijan Railways extends to Qazax.

=== Public transport ===
Gazakh has a large urban transport system, mostly managed by the Ministry of Transportation.

== Notable natives ==
Some of the city's many prestigious residents include: poets Samad Vurgun, Molla Panah Vagif, Mirvarid Dilbazi and Nusrat Kasamanli, scholar Molla Vali Vidadi, lieutenant-general of the Russian imperial army Ali-Agha Shikhlinski, writer Ismayil Shykhly and wrestler Hasan Aliyev.

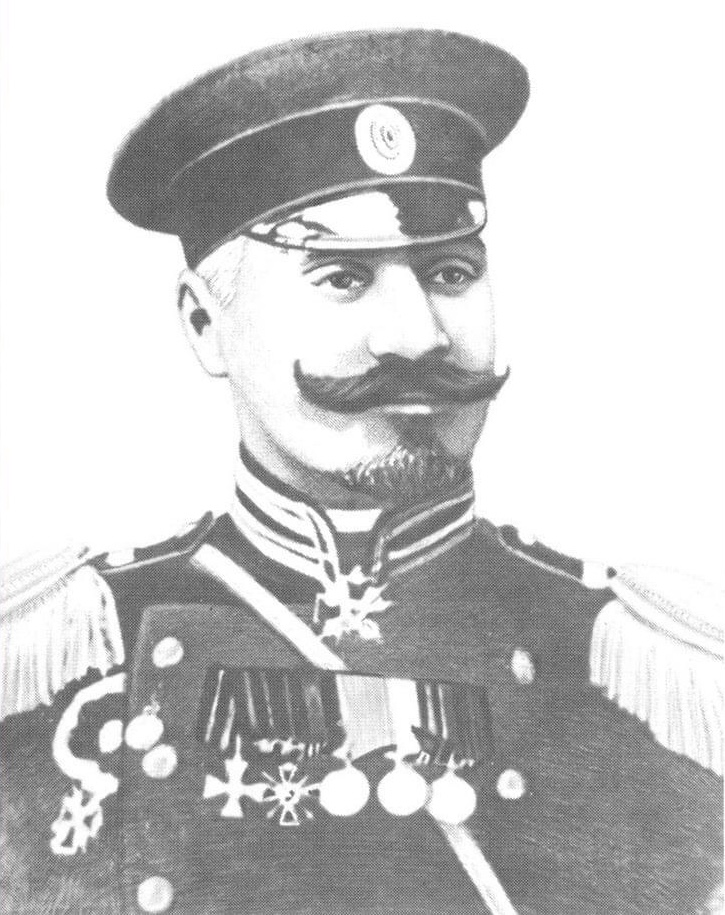
Ali-Agha Shikhlinski, was lieutenant-general of the Russian imperial army.

Mirvarid Dilbazi, poet.

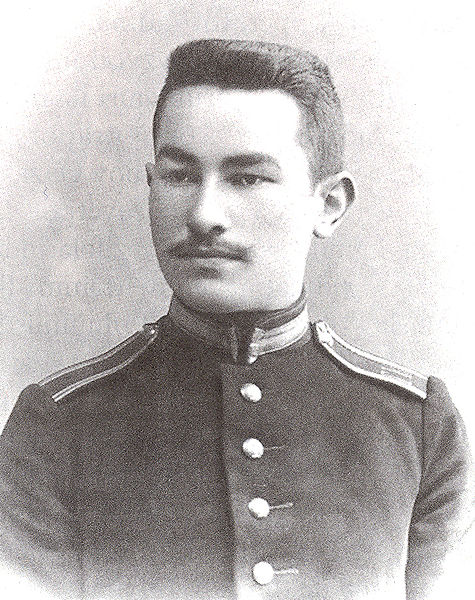
Farrukh Gayibov, considered to be the first Azerbaijani pilot.

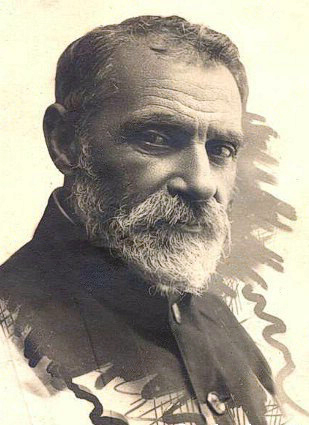
Samad aga Agamalioglu, was a statesman and socialist revolutionary.

== Sister cities ==
- Bolu, Turkey
- Trakai, Lithuania
- Taraz, Kazakhstan

== Gallery ==
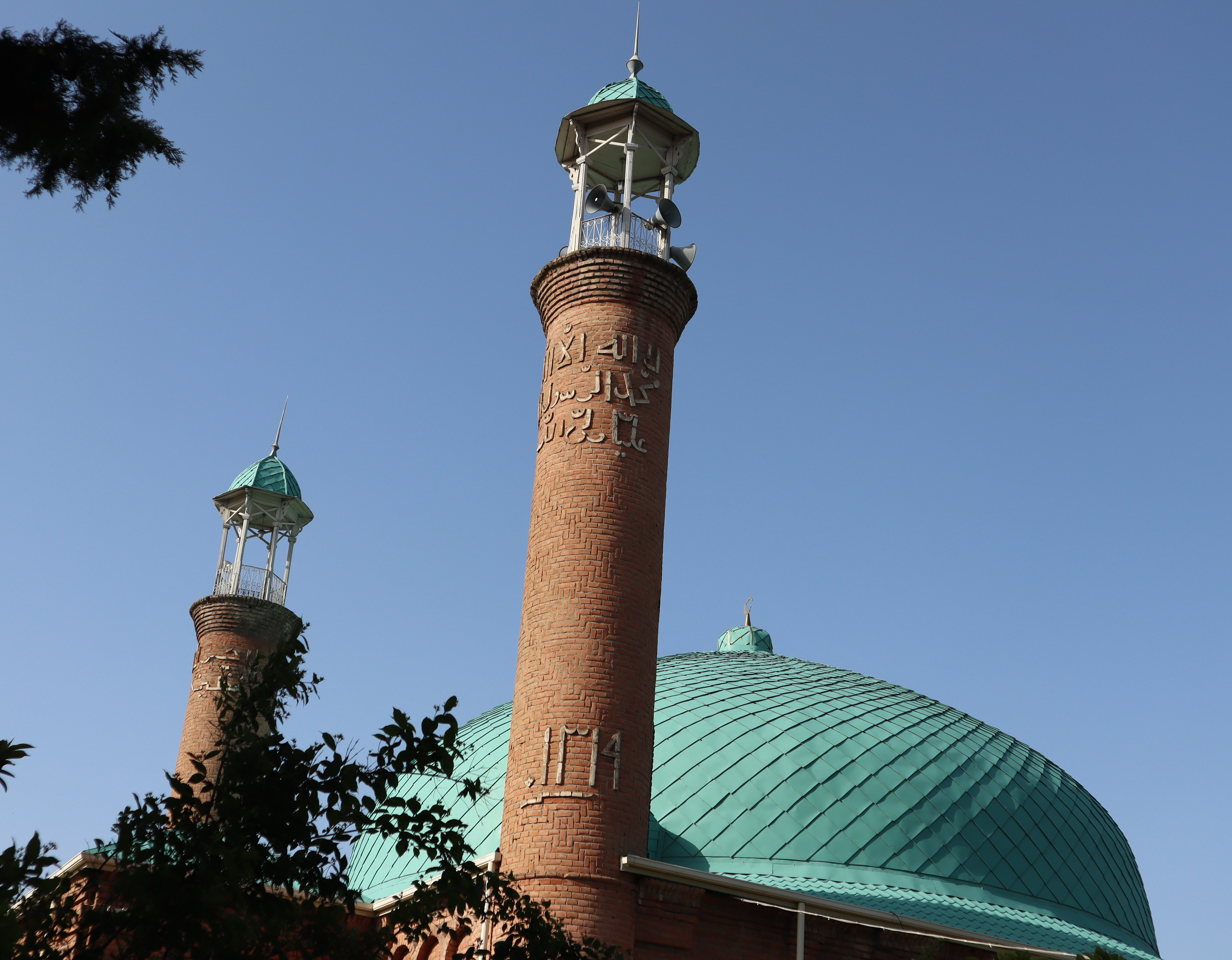
Gazakh mosque

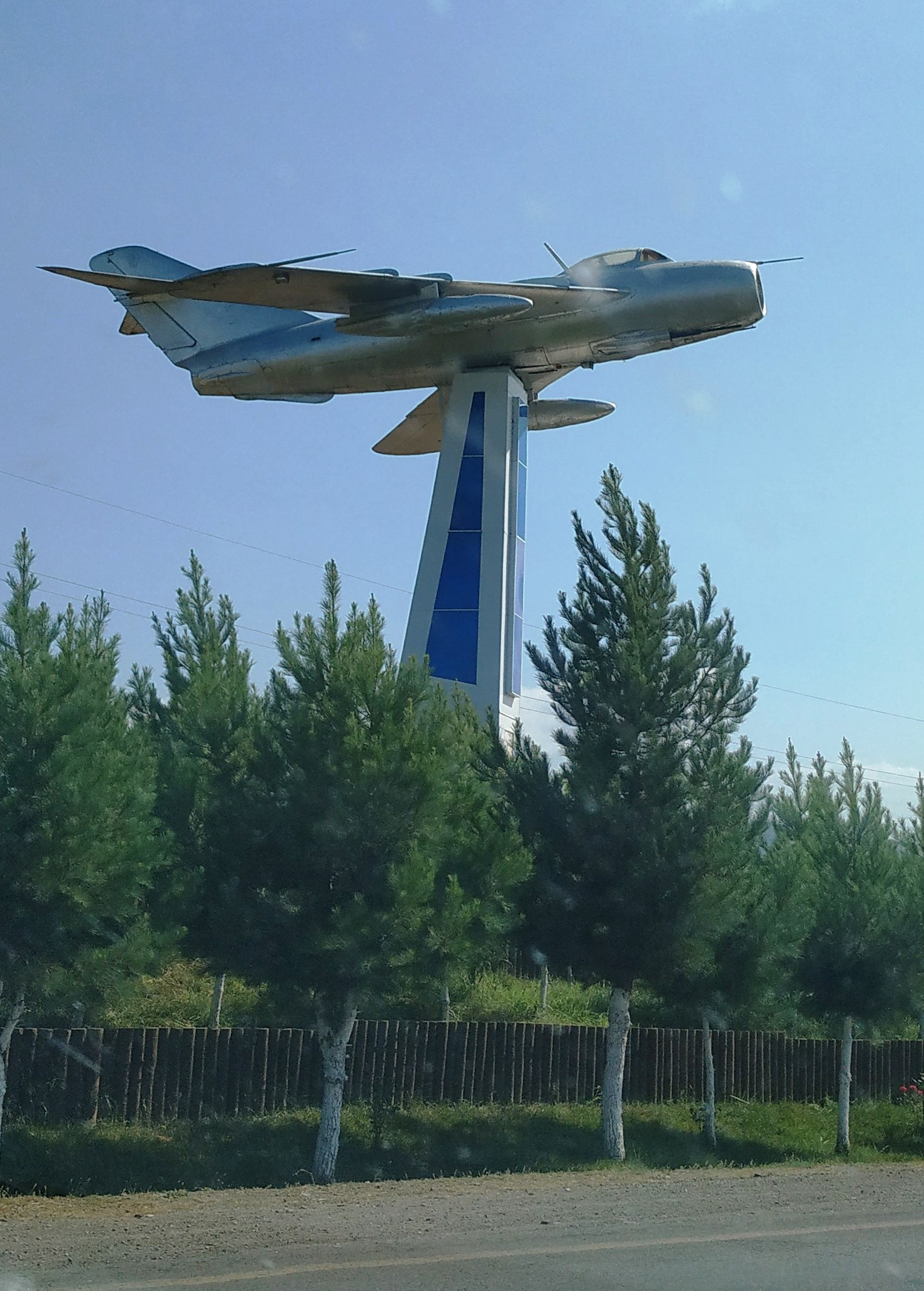
Monument for memory of Farrukh Gayibov

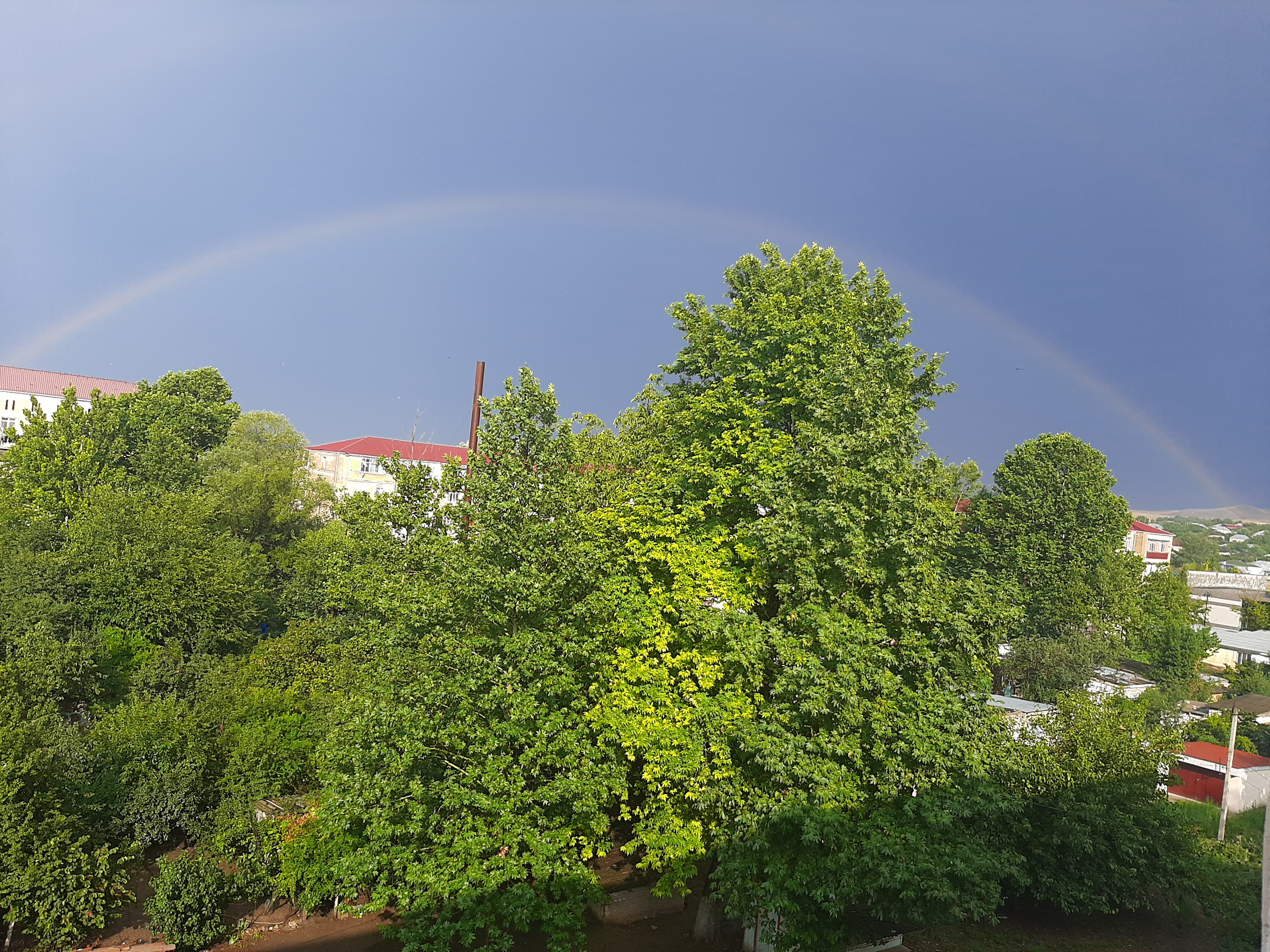
Nature and Rainbow.
