= Nusrat Kasamanli =

Azerbaijani poet

- Azerbaijani: Nüsrət Yusif oğlu Kəsəmənli
- Born: September 29, 1946
- Died: October 16, 2003 (aged 57)

Nusrat Kasamanli (Azerbaijani: Nüsrət Yusif oğlu Kəsəmənli) (September 25/29 1946, Qazakh – October 16, 2003, Tabriz) was an Azerbaijani poet and screenwriter. He was a member of the Azerbaijan Writers’ Union from 1977 and a laureate of the Azerbaijan SSR Lenin Komsomol Prize in 1982. Kasamanli is best known in Azerbaijan for his love of poetry, many of which were adapted into songs. His contributions to the genre of romantic poetry opened a distinctive new chapter in Azerbaijani literature.

== Life ==
Nusrat Kasamanli was born in 1945 in the Aghstafa District of Azerbaijan. In 1966, he enrolled in the Faculty of Journalism at Azerbaijan State University. While in his second year, he began working as a correspondent and literary staff member for the newspapers Bakı and Baku, which led him to transfer to the part-time (extramural) department in 1969. After graduating, he worked as a referent and literary consultant at the Azerbaijan Writers’ Union from 1978 to 1985.

Kasamanli began his literary career in the early 1960s. Music was composed for approximately 150 of his poems. He was the screenwriter of several documentary films, including The Cry of Empty Villages, Improvisation on a Theme, On Guard of the Presses, and Journey to Soviet Azerbaijan, as well as feature films such as The Arms of Aphrodite and A Karabakh Story. He participated in the 6th and 7th All-Union Conferences of Young Writers held in Moscow.

He was also an active public figure. He served as chairman of the Trade Union Committee of the Azerbaijan Writers’ Union (1981–1984), was a candidate member of the presidium of the Republic Committee of the Trade Union of Cultural Workers, a member of the Azerbaijan Society for the Protection of Historical and Cultural Monuments, and a board member at the 6th and 7th congresses of the Azerbaijan Writers’ Union, where he was also elected chairman of the Poetry Council. From 1985, he worked as chief editor at the Jafar Jabbarli Azerbaijanfilm studio. He was also the screenwriter and host of the documentary television program A Window to the World starting from 1985.

Nusrat Kasamanli died on 15 October 2003 in Tabriz.

He was one of the founders of the Civic Solidarity Party and among the first members of its Supreme Assembly.

== Selected works ==
- Sevirsənsə (If you love), 1971
- Gözlərimin qarası (Apple of my eyes), 1975
- Özümə bənzədiyim günlər (Days adorned for myself), 1979
- Gümüş yuxular (Silver dreams), 1981
- Təklikdə danışaq (Let's talk alone), 1983

=== Notable poems ===
- I No Longer Believe in Fairy Tales
- There Was One, There Was None…
- If I Forget You…
- Let the Homeland Ignite with Your Fire
- This World Will Remain Without Me One Day
- I Want to Be a Thief
- Shade Beneath the Tree
- Sheep Will Devour the Wolves…
- When I Fall Out with Love
- If It Does Not Exist
- I Feel Sorry for That Tree…
- You Do Not Believe Me Like a Dream
- Do Not Believe, My Dear—Believe, My Dear

== Filmography ==
- The Arms of Aphrodite (1987, short feature film)
- Journey to Azerbaijan (1988)
- On the Lifestyle of Muslims in Azerbaijan (1987)
- Native Shores (1989)
- The Only One in the World (1989)
- On Guard of the Presses (1988)
- Goranboy – Land of the Oghuz (1989)
- The Cry of Villages (1987)
- From Congress to Congress (1985)
- Latifa (1989)
- Monologue (1987)
- Muslims in the Struggle for Peace (1987)
- Neftchi-87 (1987)
- Sherali and Ayberchin (1989)
- The Devil in Plain Sight (1987)

== Sources ==
- Majdfar, Morteza (26 May 2005). مروری بر زندگی و اشعار "نصرت کَسَمنلی" ، شاعر معاصر جمهوری آذربایجان [The review of life and works of "Nusrat Kasamanli", contemporary Azerbaijani poet]. Hamshahri (in Persian). Archived from the original on 16 November 2012.
