= Qatari clothing =

Clothing in Qatar

Qatari clothing is similar to other countries in the Arabian Peninsula, typically consisting of a ghutra, agal, and thawb for men, and an abaya and shayla for women. Face veils, usually either a niqāb or gulf burqa, are sometimes worn by women. Depending on the context and setting, men and women will make micro-adjustments to their dress to better suit the situation, such as tilting the agal for men or loosening the abaya for women in informal contexts. Some differences exist between rural (Bedouin) and urban traditional dress, although these variations are mostly minor and superficial.

== Men's clothing ==
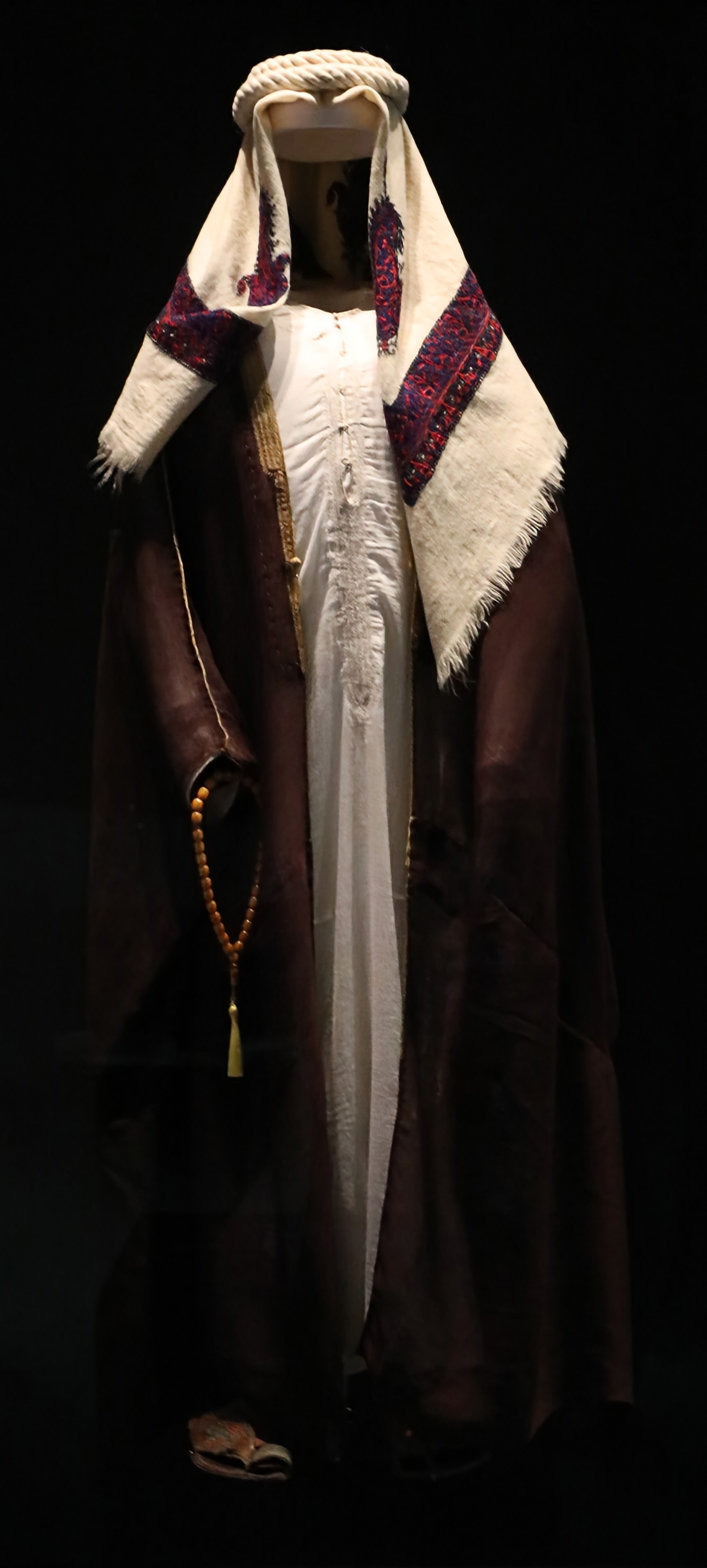
Historical formal ware of Qatari men on display in the Qatar National Museum

Qatari men wear thawbs (a long white shirt) over loose pants. Aside from protecting the wearer against the dangers of the sun, the thawb also serves as a symbol of affiliation. In previous decades, different types of thawbs were used depending on the occasion, though this is seldom the case in present-day. For instance, the thawb al-nashal is considered the grandest and most ornamental type and was used for celebrations such as weddings, birthdays, and family gatherings. Long strips embroidered with beads run down the length of the thawb al-nashal. It is usually black but can come in colors such as blue and red. It is common for men to replace their outfit with a newly tailored one every year, usually during a holiday such as Eid.

The thawb is the piece of garment almost exclusively worn during the summer, but during the cooler months men may opt to wear other traditional dresses such as the al-shadd, al-daqlah, al-sidairi, al-bisht and al-dafa, though these are less common than in previous decades.

They also wear a loose headdress, a ghutra, which comes in white or red, which is secured by a black rope known as an agal. Qatari men typically prefer the white ghutra to the red ghutra. There are different styles of wearing the ghutra, including the cobra style.

=== Accessories ===
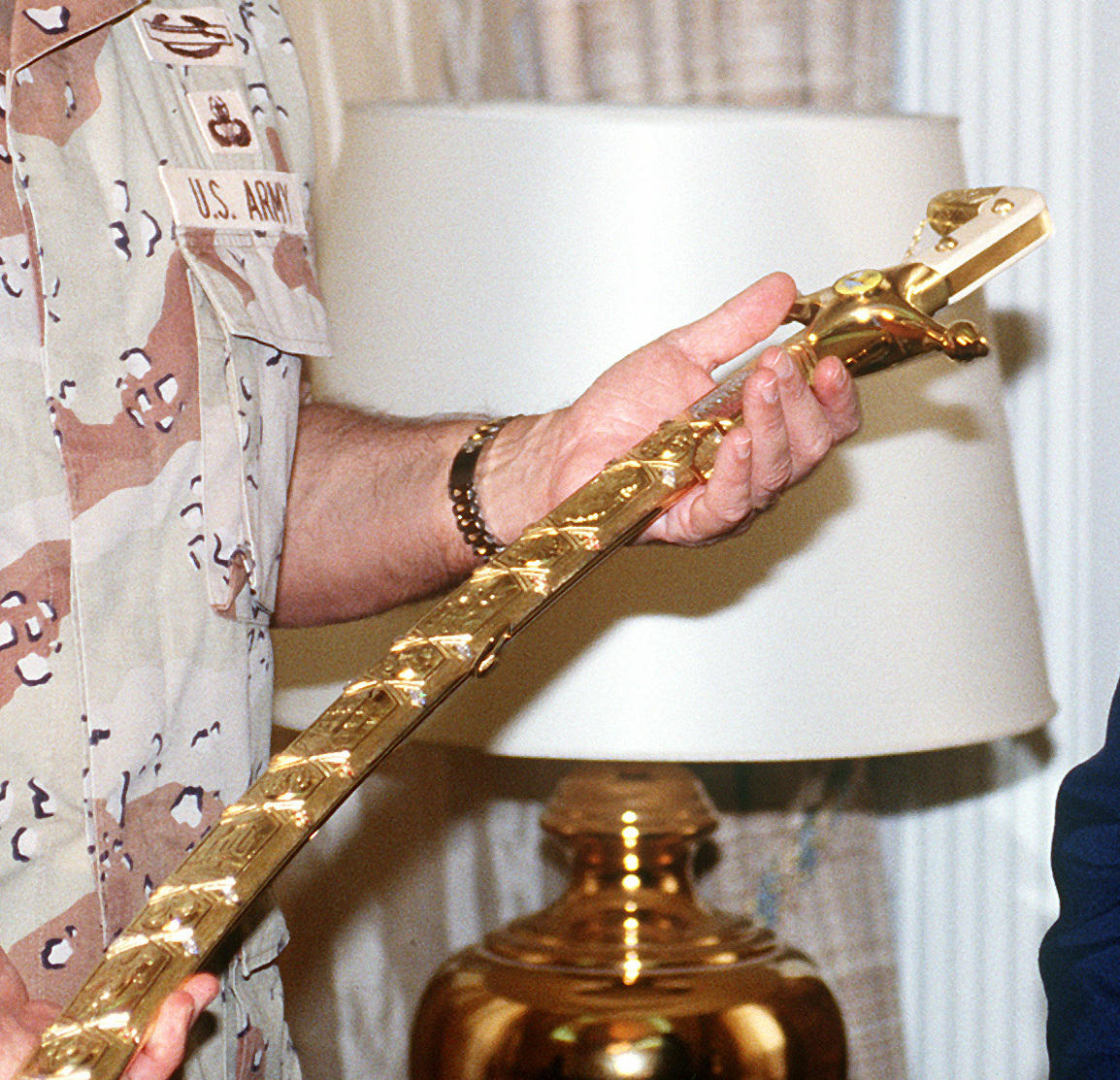
A sword with a golden sheath and the emblem of Qatar

Traditional accessories worn by Qatari men include sword or dagger sheaths, which may be attached to the belt. Both the belts and sheaths can be decorated with either gold or silver. Firearms owned by men are similarly embellished.

=== Bisht ===
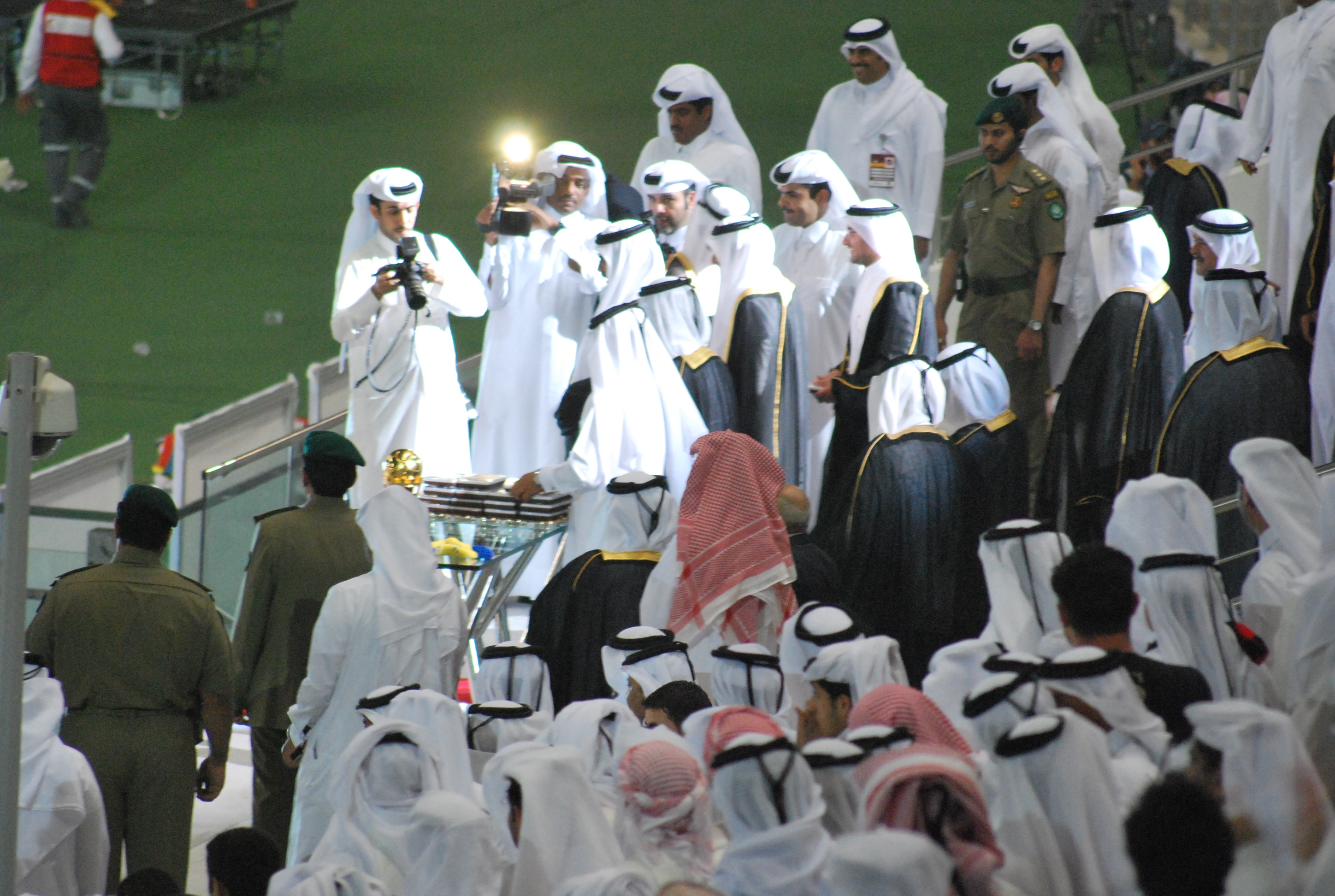
Members of Qatar's ruling family and government officials wearing the bisht over their thawbs during a football tournament

The bisht is a flowing cloak worn over a thawb for celebrations and special occasions. The word "bisht" is of Persian origin, derived from "bosht" meaning "behind," referencing the garment's function of covering the back. There are two main types based on thickness and seasonality: the thin, lightweight bisht for summer and the thick bisht for winter. Unlike other forms of traditional men's clothing aside from the thawb, the bisht has remained relatively steady in its popularity in Qatar. Qatari-crafted bishts are known especially for their softness. A bisht can last its wearer up to 30 years.

The craft of bisht-making, performed by the elhayek (bisht maker), is an artistic skill involving the use of various colors such as white, black, red, brown, and off-white. Bishts are traditionally made from various wools, including goat and camel, usually imported from surrounding countries. The embroidery utilizes silk threads, gold and silver plated threads, and other embellishments. The crafting process involves specialized tools like hammers, needles of various sizes, and a measuring instrument known as el'fetya.

The bisht has distinct components like sleeves (el'jem), inner lining (el'qtan), and el'khabena, which is knitting that adjusts the bisht's length. Types of bisht embroidery include:

- Elhei'la: Triangle- or square-shaped embroidery using zari yarn.
- El'brouj: Final embroidery along the top sides and back, forming an attractive pattern.
- Halazuni: Spiral knitting between el'terjeib and el'heila.
- El'terjeib: Parallel threads of zari yarn and cotton on the bisht's top.
- Lam'toun: Embroidery along the hand from the shoulder to the palm.
- Darboujaah: A combination of el'mekser, el'heeli, elbrouj, and el'k'taen.
- El'mekser: Uses zari yarn and el-breesem in bisht crafting.

Among the most well-known types of bisht are the combed bisht, an haute couture bisht with intricate embroidery resembling comb lines, adorned with gold, silver, and vibrant lines, the Najafi bisht, and the el'baraqa bisht, which is more historically common.

== Women's clothing ==
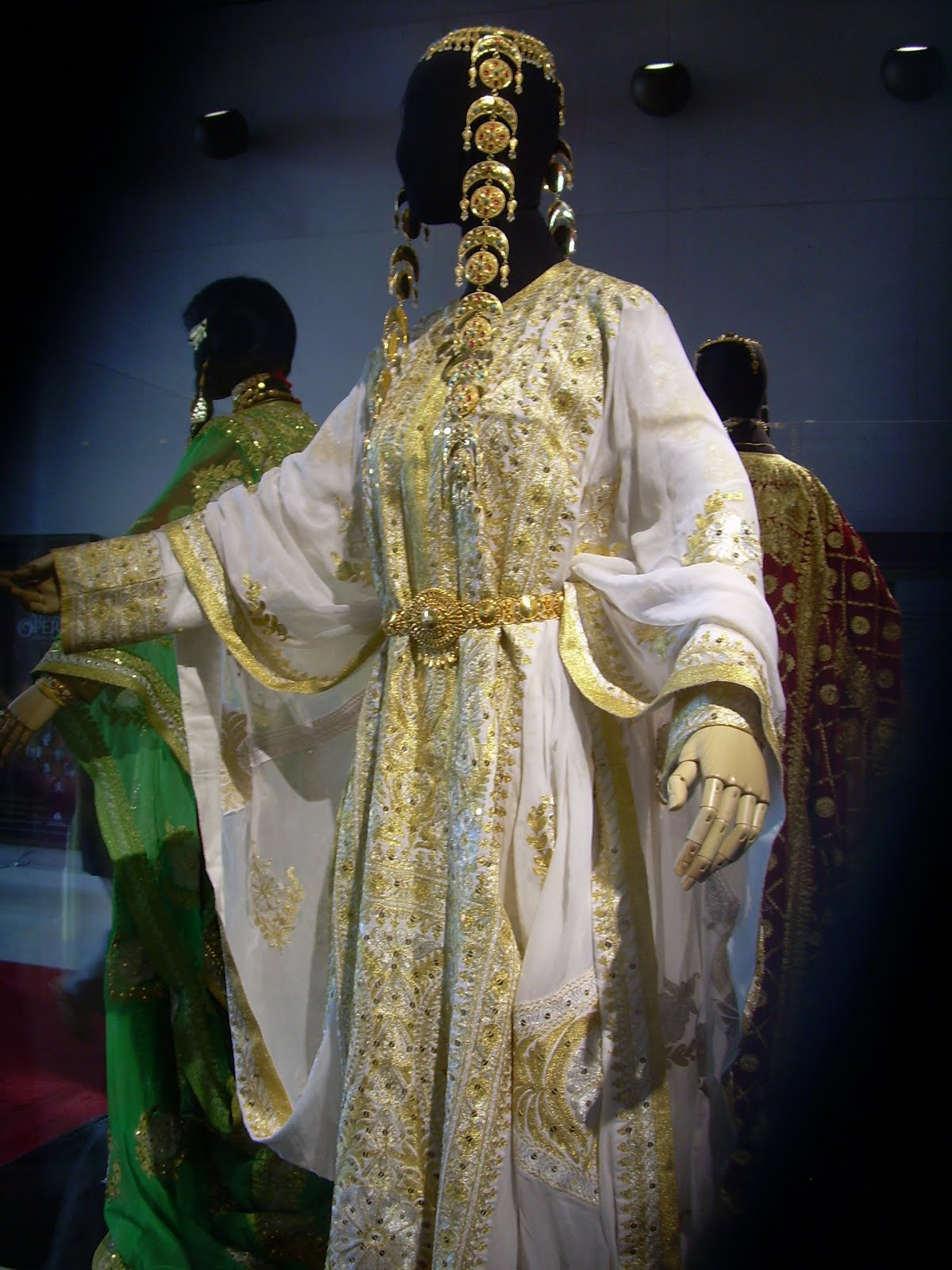
Traditional Qatari bride wear consisting of a white thawb al nashal with a daara being worn underneath it

Qatari women generally wear customary dresses that include the black colored body covering known as the abaya together with the black scarf used for covering their heads known as the shayla. The abaya is seen as essential wear when a woman ventures out into public to preserve her modesty, and is symbolic of a woman's honor and reputation. It is also worn to symbolize both status and culture.

Aside from the abaya, women may wear long dresses with floral designs while at home. In Bedouin society, women wore simple and plain dresses devoid of any designs and usually containing only a limited selection of colors, namely red, black, and indigo. A specific type of dress especially popular among Bedouin women is the daraa. This is a long gown with spacious sleeves. Threads of wool, cotton and apricot were used to embroider this dress. There exists several variants of the daraa, including mahrzanah, Bedouin daraa, hammered daraa, woven daraa, daraa zam, daraa thuraya and daraa makura.

During celebratory occasions and special events, the colorful and embroidered thawb al-nashal is worn by women. It is generally square in shape, made of silk and has vastly oversized sleeves. It comes in many colors, but vibrant shades of orange, red, green and black are common. Gold and silver zari threads are embroidered into the dress to form what are typically floral or geometric patterns. The daraa may be worn under it. Several other types of luxurious and ornate dresses were used on special occasions, including thawb mufahaha, thawb mujarah and thawb kurar.

=== Face and head veils ===
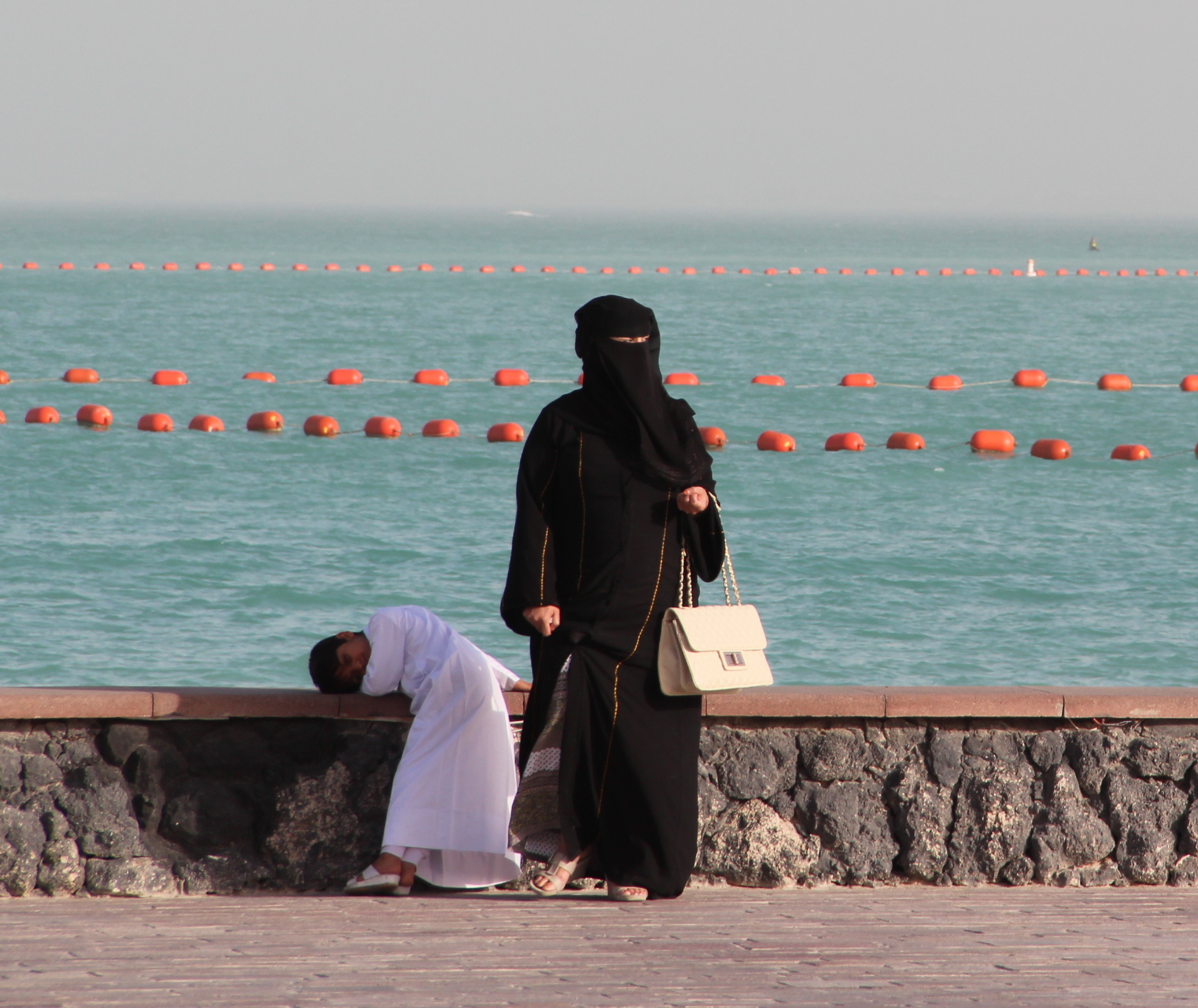
A Qatari woman wearing an abaya and niqāb

The shayla, a black headscarf typically made of cotton, is used to conceal a woman's hair and neck. It is commonly worn even while at home. The ghashwa is a flowing, lightweight cotton fabric that fits over the abaya and shayla, used in public places to cover a woman's head. Al ghero, a silver ornament, may be attached to a woman's head scarf. Another ornament is al meshbas, which may either be silver or gold, and is shaped like a leaf. Besides serving aesthetic purposes, these ornaments also secure the head scarf to the woman's head.

In recent years, the niqāb, a garment which covers the upper body and entire face excluding the eyes, has emerged as the most common way for a woman to shield her face. A burqa, an enveloping outer garment which fully covers the body and the face, is also sometimes worn. Bedouin women use a specific type of burqa known as burqa maqrun. A thin piece of cloth known as the litham is also sometimes used as a face veil, covering the neck, mouth and part of the nose. Other types of face coverings include the milfa and battoulah. It is thought that Qatari women began using face masks in the 19th century amid substantial immigration. As they had no practical ways of concealing their faces from foreigners, they began wearing the same face mask as their Persian counterparts.

=== Girl's clothing ===
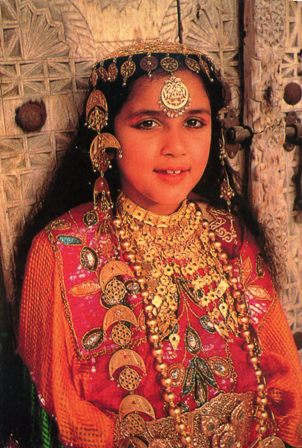
A Qatari girl in traditional attire

As Qatari girls transition into puberty, their clothing undergoes significant changes to align with cultural norms of modesty and adulthood. Around the age of twelve, girls begin to wear the al-bukhnaq, a traditional head and chest covering, which serves both as a physical protector and a societal signal that they have reached adulthood. In Bedouin areas, girls often start wearing a burqa around the age of eleven, reinforcing strict cultural expectations of decency. The burqa varies in length and style depending on the tribe but generally serves to conceal the girl's face from public view. The al-bukhnaq is typically made of black cloth, sometimes adorned with gold embroidery, and extends to cover the back down to the knees. The sleeves are typically designed with local motifs and landscapes. It ceases to be worn only after reaching marrying age.

Young girls now enjoy greater freedom in choosing their attire than in the pre-oil era, often incorporating modern dresses and accessories into their wardrobes. While the abaya— a long, flowing black robe— remains a staple of female attire, its designs have been influenced by global fashion trends, incorporating styles and fabrics from international fashion houses.

Alongside changes in clothing, the use of beauty accessories also marks the transition from childhood to adulthood. Traditionally, young girls had limited access to beauty products like perfumes, Kohl eyeliner, which was used at night for its healing properties and during the day for beauty, and henna. These were reserved for special occasions such as religious festivals and were closely monitored by their mothers to ensure compliance with cultural expectations. However, contemporary practices have relaxed these restrictions significantly. Modern Qatari girls now use a variety of beauty products regularly, including European perfumes and a wide range of cosmetics, reflecting modernization within Qatari society.

== Jewelry ==
=== Crafting ===
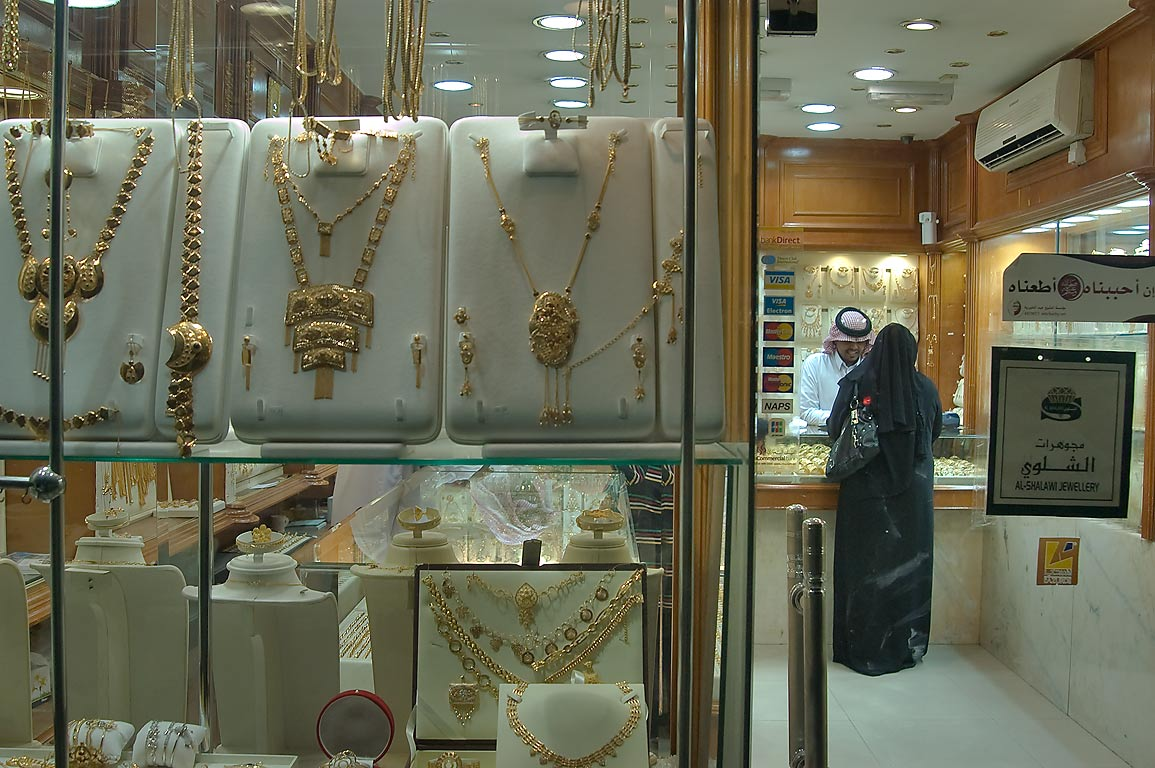
A woman purchasing jewelry at the Gold Souq in Doha

Jewelry, typically gold-adorned, is very commonly used by Qatari women during special occasions such as weddings and festivals and, to a lesser extent, for daily use. Most jewelry worn by Qatari women is handmade, even after the rise in popularity of more cost-efficient manufactured jewelry. In modern times, the jewelry pieces worn by women are typically smaller in size than those in the past. Jewelry for daily use is lightweight and thin, and is not as ornately embellished as jewelry for special occasions. In contrast, jewelry used for a wedding can be so plentiful in quantity and heavy enough to cause a bride mobility issues.

The importance placed on gold jewelry in local society can be summed up with the common Qatari proverb "Gold is an adornment and a treasure". In Qatari culture, gold jewelry is not only a form of adornment but also a financial safeguard that can sold in times of financial need. Goldsmithing (al sayegh) is seen as a noble profession passed down through generations. In the distant past, goldsmiths sometimes added a chemical dye to stones to give them the appearance of gold due to the scarcity of authentic gold.

Silver is sometimes used in jewelry, albeit on a much smaller scale than gold. Historically, Bedouin women favored silver jewelry because it was more in line with tradition and more convenient to clean. It would be imported from nearby Arab countries such as Oman, Yemen, and Saudi Arabia. It later lost popularity in the late 19th century, with Bedouin women largely turning to gold instead. On the contrary, there remains very little historical evidence of silver being used in urban communities.

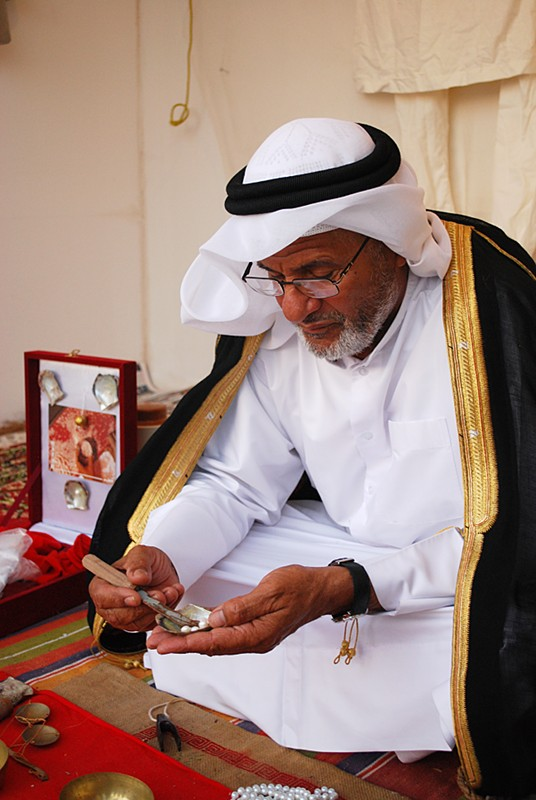
Pearl trader (tawwash) inspecting pearls

Alongside gold, precious stones such as pearls, agate, rubies, turquoise, and precious corals are also incorporated in jewelry. Red and green stones were particularly popular in Qatari jewelry as they were considered symbolic of good luck and prosperity. Decorations featuring precious stones and natural pearls became popular only after the 1950s, coinciding with oil exploitation. Prior to this, pearls were a significant revenue source for the people of Qatar and were predominantly sold abroad. During this period, Qatari jewelry was commonly adorned with glass and coral beads. The advent of cultured pearls and increased local wealth from the oil industry made natural pearls more accessible, leading to their widespread use in Qatari jewelry.

Patterns of engravement on jewelry were either floral patterns, abstract geometric patterns or patterns inspired by local geography and culture, such as those seen in habaat alhil, a type of bracelet named and designed after cardamom pods and worn while visiting friends and family. Another example is al mashmoum, a type of earring named after and engraved with plant designs.

=== Necklaces ===
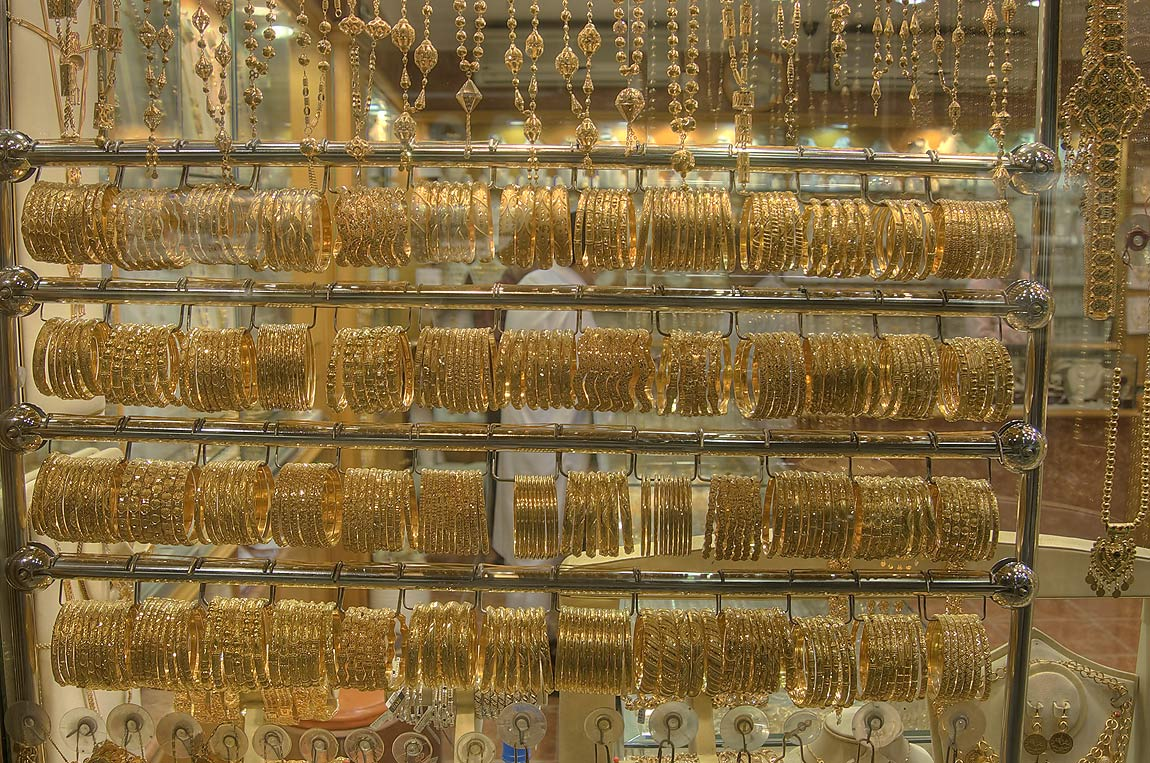
Golden bracelets and necklaces at the Gold Souq in Doha

Necklaces vary in length, with some being waist-length and others extending only to the top of the neck. Some are highly ornamental, with a pearl attached to the chain called maarah, while others use only simple beads. Among the types of necklaces worn by Qatari woman are al murta'ishah, al qirdala, al murtahish, al muqlus, al maera, al marari, al muaari, sent, marriya misbah and marriya umm tableh.

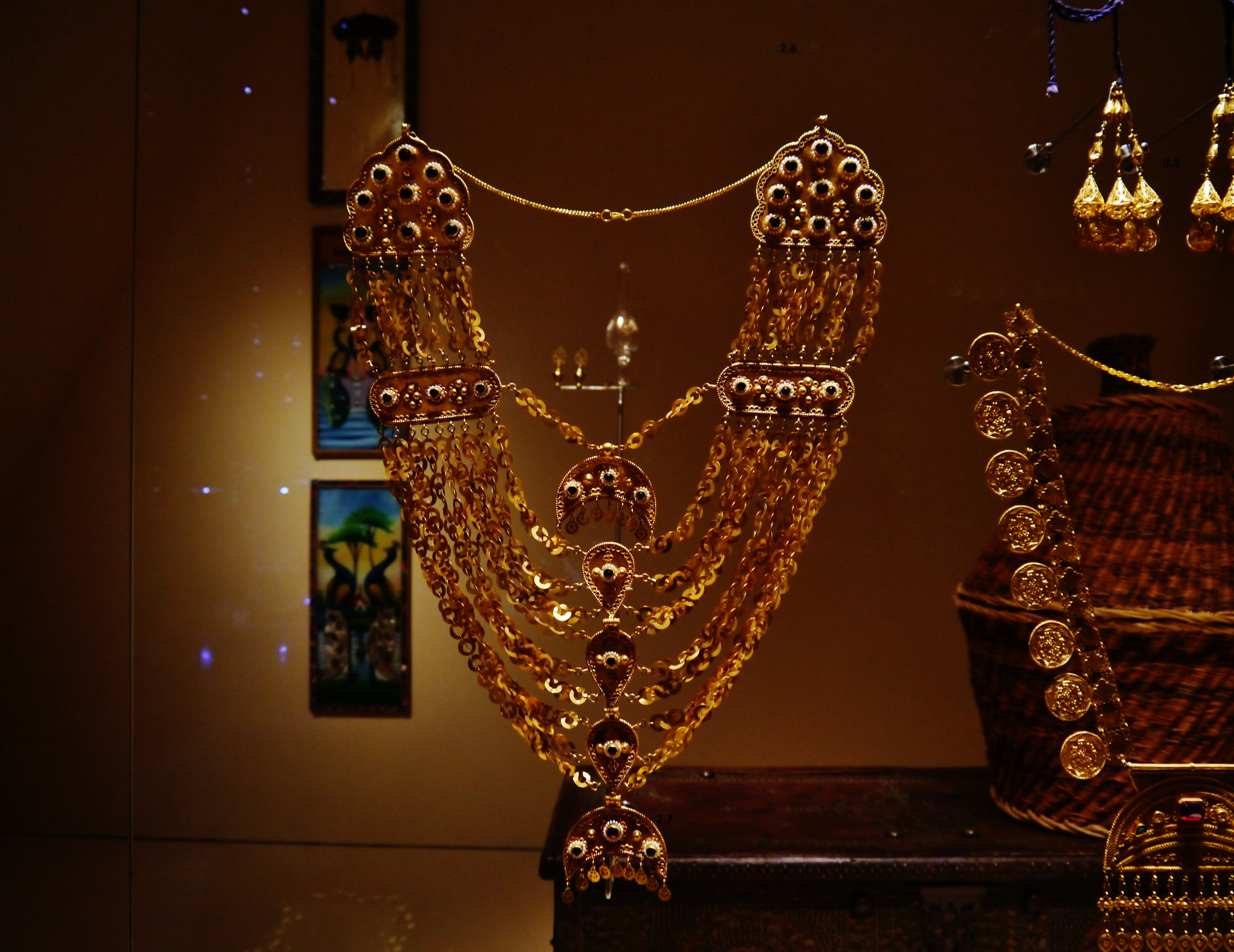
An al murta'ishah necklace on display in the National Museum of Qatar

Al murta'ishah is a prominent piece of jewelry that women used to wear to enhance their appearance during weddings and similar events. It was commonly included in a dowry, though sometimes it was borrowed from family or friends for a bride to wear during her henna ceremony and wedding. Typically, al murta'ishah is crafted from pure gold, but it can also feature a combination of gold and silver. The name of al murta'ishah comes from the word alerta'ash, which means "to shiver", reflecting how the chains of this jewelry, referred to as marasil, tremble with the wearer's movements. Al murta'ishah comes in various sizes, with some covering only portions of the neck, while others extend down to the chest. The piece consisted of several solid segments that were connected by seven parallel golden chains.

Sent is a type of necklace worn by both women and children constructed from sturdy cotton and enveloped in a light-hued cotton fabric sewn on the inner side. It is embellished with silver, coral, and glass beads. Mariya misbah is a simple prayer beads necklace worn by young children. Another type of necklace commonly worn by children is the marriya umm tableh, which translates to "drum-shaped necklace". This name refers to the central amulet of the necklace. Inside the amulet, Quranic verses and prayers are placed to protect the child from the evil eye and black magic.

=== Earrings ===
Earrings, locally called shaghab, are standard pieces of jewelry seen, varying in size from 10 cm to several millimeters. A widespread practice involves affixing a short chain, called dalayah, to the earring with a pearl or other precious gem attached to the bottom of the chain. Prior to the 20th century, Qatari earrings were primarily known for their funnel-like form and lack of decoration. Over time, they evolved to become more intricate and detailed, gradually incorporating gemstones, most notably the pearl. Types of common earrings include al ghalmiyyat, al kawashi, shaghab kasra, shaghab taama, al mashmoum and al raamiliyat.

Al ghalmiyyat are funnel-shaped earrings consisting of an empty octahedral structure encircled by serrated embellishments, culminating in three protruding spherical ends. Above this segment is an interconnected perforated sphere, which is set with a turquoise stone. At the top, a sharp hook allows for insertion into the earlobe. Each earring measures approximately 7 centimeters in length. The central portion of the earring is adorned with a ring of notched beads, concluding with three small balls. Traditionally, Qatari women wore al ghalmiyyat during festive occasions and family gatherings.

=== Nose piercings ===
Zamim, the local name for a type of nose-jewel originating from India, was used on rare occasion by Qatari women. It was typically placed on the right side of the nose. Variants of zamim included zamim bjlab, zamim baraqi and al najma.

=== Headgear ===
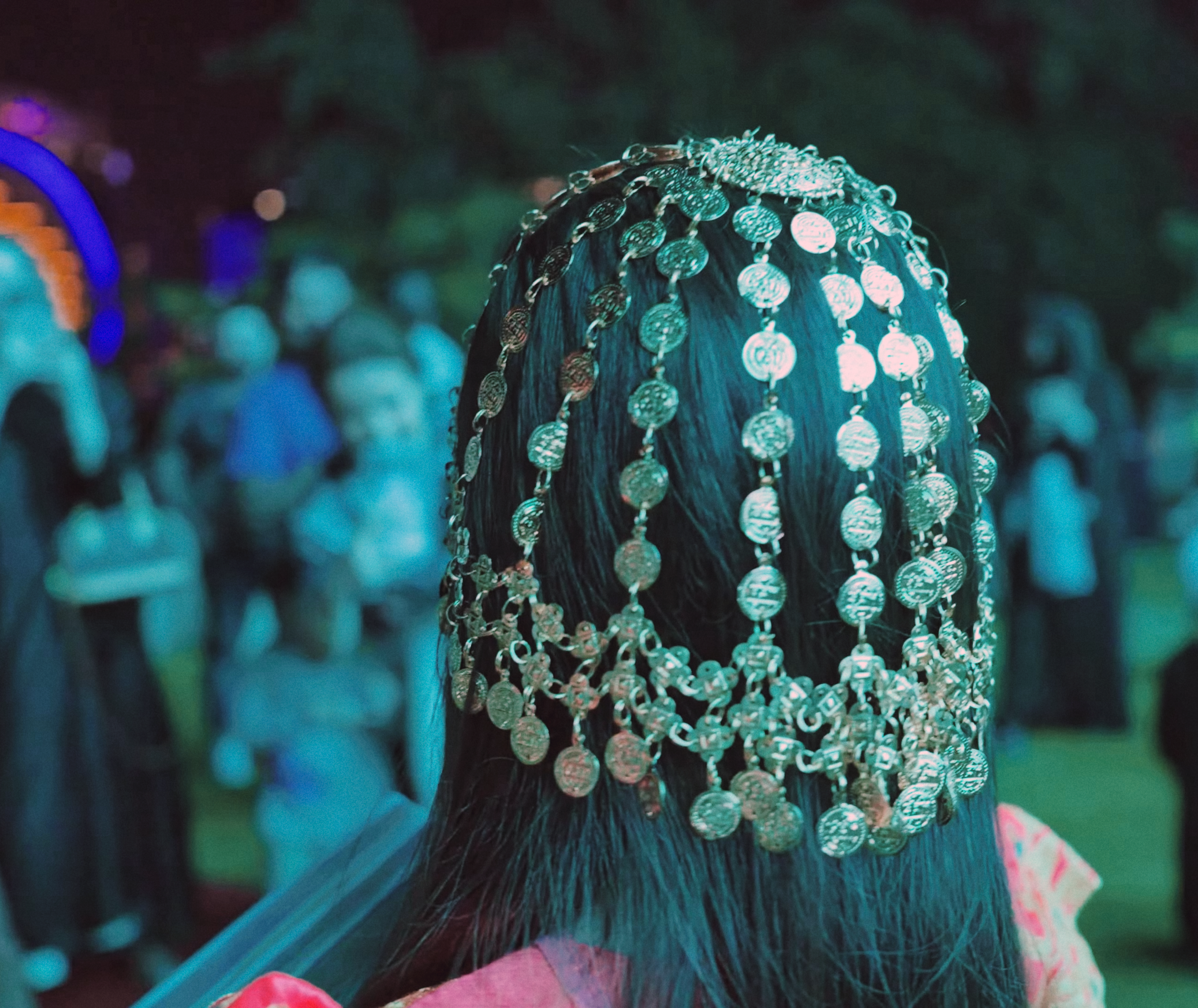
A gold cap with chains worn by a girl during Garangao

Head accessories worn by women date to pre-Islamic times, when it was typical for women to wear crowns. These crowns were circular headdresses adorned with jewels. Types include al tasa, tasat al sa'ad, al diynar, al qabqab and al hilali.

Tasat al sa'ad, or "cap of joy and fortune", is an oval-shaped gold skull-cap featuring two long, dangling chains on each side, known as surareh. The surareh are the Qatari version of what is known throughout the Gulf as surooh, which are rarely used in neighboring countries but are common in Qatar. After braiding the hair at the back of the head, the cap is secured with a bent metal piece. Often, a crescent-shaped gold ornament hangs on the forehead, believed to bring good luck. The cap consists of interconnected gold pieces forming chains, each adorned with floral-like embossments and secured by silver ornaments called hamah on the sides of the head. This piece of jewelry is essential for brides and is typically presented on the morning of the wedding night. Another special occasion where headpieces are worn is Garangao, where it is customary for girls to wear a cap with golden chains and trinkets adjoined to it, sometimes extending down to shoulder-length. Al risha and al mashbas are two gold pieces that are placed on either side of the head to secure the hair. They are sometimes inlaid with precious stones and come in the shape of either a feather or a leaf.

=== Hand and feet ornamentation ===
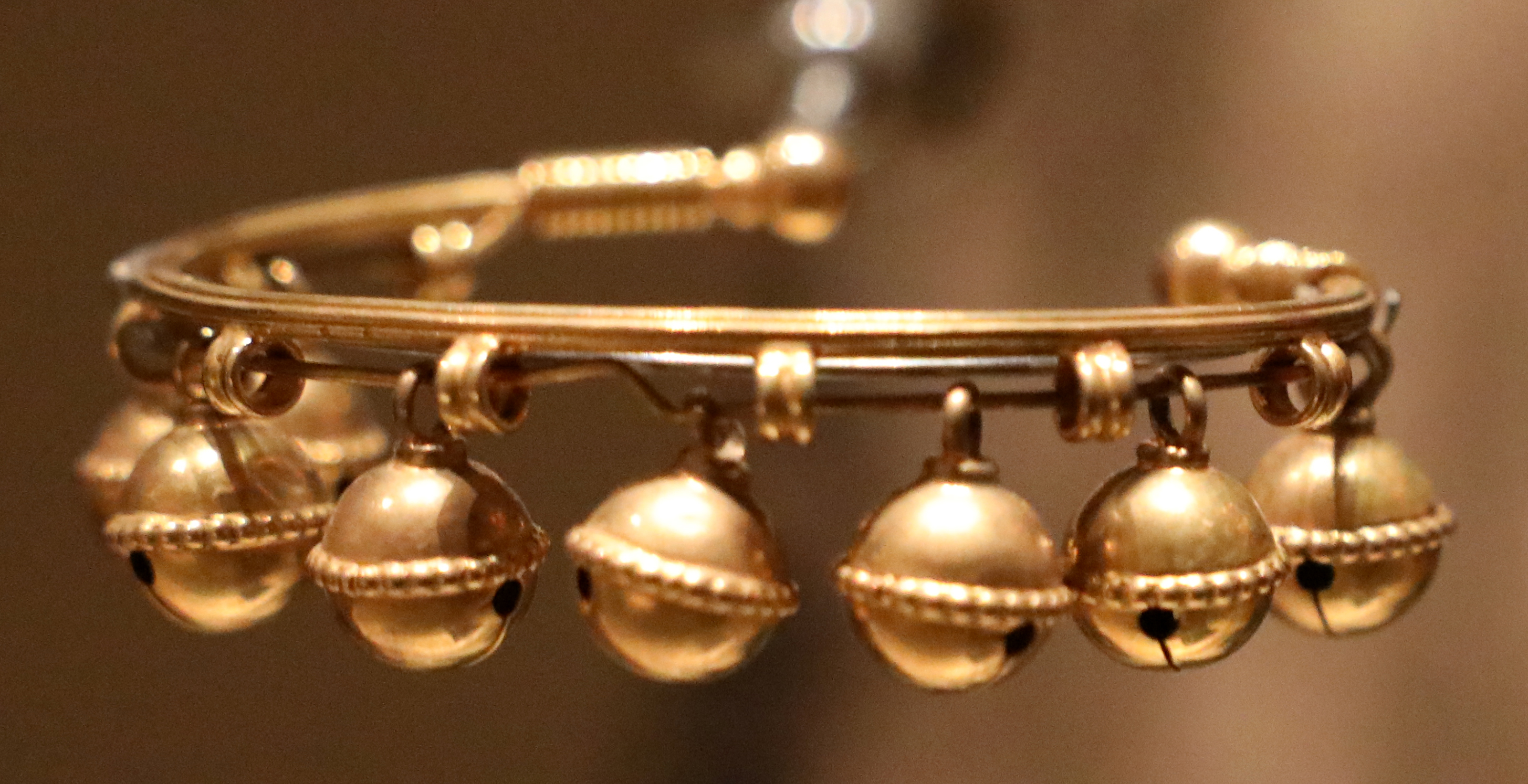
A gold ankle bracelet on display in Qatar National Museum

Perhaps the most plentiful piece of jewelry is al mdhaed, or fine bracelets. More than one is typically worn, sometimes numbering to over a dozen. Other types of bracelets exist, the miltafah being two plaited cables, while others consist only of colored beads, with the occasional golden one.

Al khus, also known as suwayrat, is another type of bracelet characterized by a triangular design. This piece features a clasp mechanism and a pointed element and can be crafted from small solid gold pieces or wider, intricately engraved sections. It is fastened around the wrist using coiled wires that are soldered together. The bracelet often includes colorful stones, typically red or green, for added visual appeal. Some versions are thick and showcase elaborate decorations, such as circular gold elements and clusters of rubies and turquoise stones. These stones are arranged in floral patterns, with each cluster containing four stones centered around a gold sphere, and each gold sphere cluster featuring a ruby or turquoise at the center. Small gold balls, shaped into triangular forms, separate each floral cluster. Qatari women typically wear al khus during Eid al-Fitr and other festive occasions.

Other types of bracelets include al madla and al hijal, which are silver bracelets similar to khus but thinner and with simpler decorations. They are typically worn more than one at a time. Al banka is a thick silver bracelet similar to al khus worn by Bedouin women.

Rings are often worn multiple at a time, with a popular trend being to connect four rings, each to be worn on their corresponding finger, together with a chain, which may also be attached to the woman's bracelets, if worn. Types of rings worn include al mahbas (a wedding ring), al marmah (a golden ring worn on the middle finger), al shahid (worn on the right index finger), al fatakh (a large, unadorned ring), and al kaf.

Ornamentation worn around the feet includes al fatakh (a toe ring), anklets and al huyul (a silver or gold bracelet). However, these are not widely used by Qatari women.

== Cosmetics ==
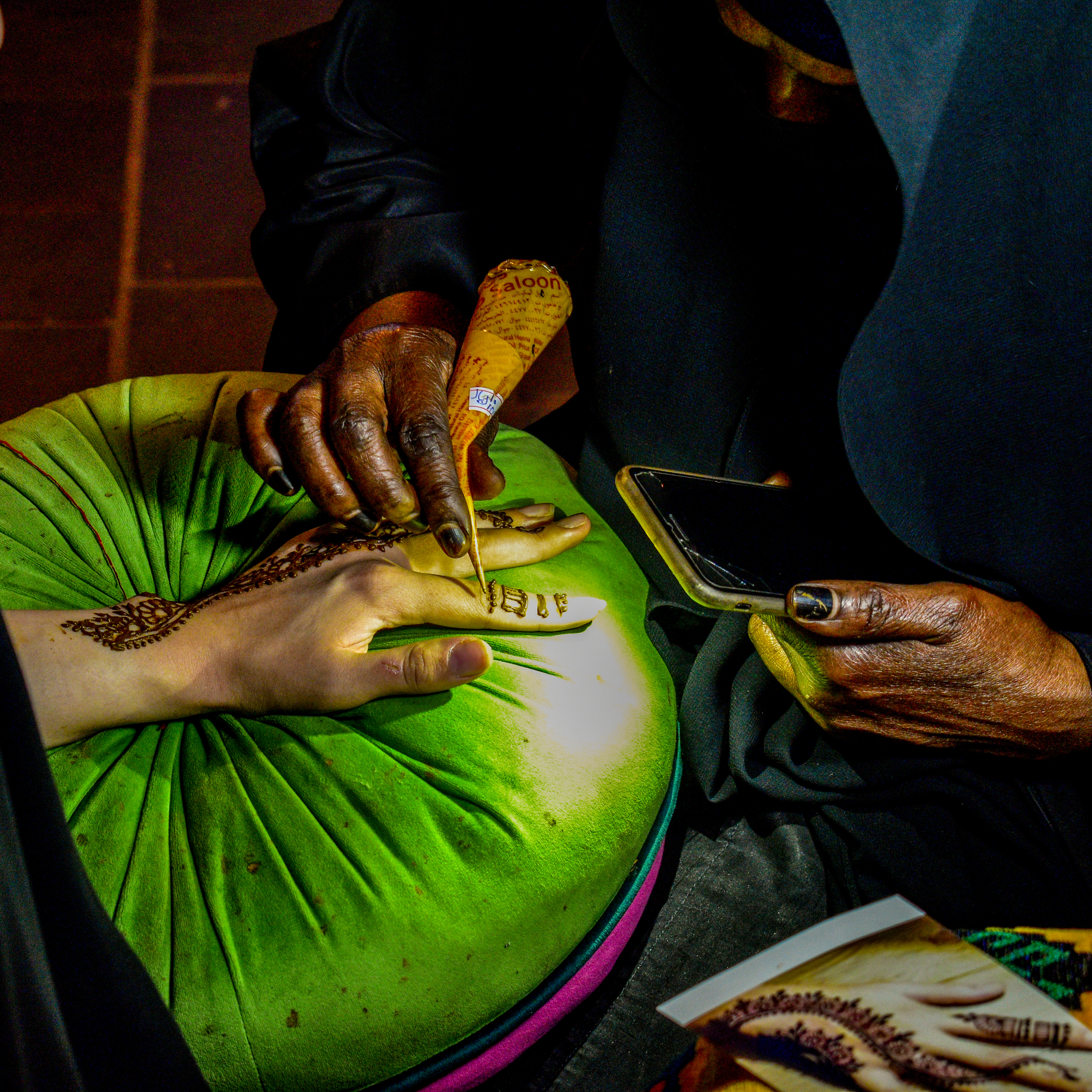
Henna being applied at Souq Waqif

Qatari women have historically utilized various materials to enhance their appearance. These materials, primarily sourced from the natural environment, have been in use in the Arabian Peninsula and its surrounding areas for centuries. Key materials for women's adornment include henna, derm (derived from an herb), harmal (derived from Peganum harmala), java beans, saffron, sidr, safflower, kohl, and mahlab, among others. Women often create mixtures from these materials to maintain their hair's beauty and as makeup and fragrances. Mahlab, derived from the Prunus mahaleb, was a fundamental ingredient in many hair care products. In traditional society, daily use of cosmetics was not common due to social stigma and was instead mainly confined to celebratory occasions, with a few exceptions, such as the facial application of kohl at night for skin repair.

An embellishment ritual known as Henna Night (Laylat Al-Ghumra) takes place the day before a bride's wedding. During this ritual, the bride wears a thawb al nashal or another ornamental gown, and the attendees, who are the bride and groom's female family members, apply elaborate henna designs on each other. Applying henna is also customary for Qatari women during Eid al-Fitr. Traditionally, women within the family undertook the task of henna preparation and application, using natural ingredients. However, the modernization of Qatari society has led to the emergence of professional henna artists and specialized salons, offering intricate designs and tattoo patterns. Bridal henna celebrations, once confined to intimate family gatherings, now encompass vibrant rituals, including festive banquets and jalwa ceremonies, where the bride, typically garmented in green, watches as female participants sing.

Women frequently use hair sprays, such as al-mashat (a mixture containing lavender, sidr, cloves, date seeds, henna, rosemary, and basil, among others) or al shamtari (derived from a wild herb similar to mint), year-round to promote hair growth and thickness. In Bedouin society, the mother typically styled her and her daughters' hair, while affluent families might employ a woman, referred to as "ajafa" among urban dwellers, to tend to their hair. The comb, or in some cases basil, was used to straighten the hair. When a woman notices greying of hair, she may use a traditional treatment consisting of basil and henna to give her hair a reddish color. Henna was also used to dye women's hair during holidays like Eid al-Fitr.

Al rushush, a blend of natural materials like dried roses, musk, sandalwood, cloves, saffron, henna, rose water, and mahlab, was used for hair care. The exact composition of these materials varied according to local traditions. The preparation of rushush begins with collecting roses and removing their fruit. These roses are then purified, washed, sprinkled with rose water and saffron, and left to dry for three to four days. In some variations, cloves are roasted over a fire to remove the soft inner part of its bud, which is combined with the dried roses. Sandalwood, basil, and both white and black musk are added, and the mixture is ground in a mill to create the final product.

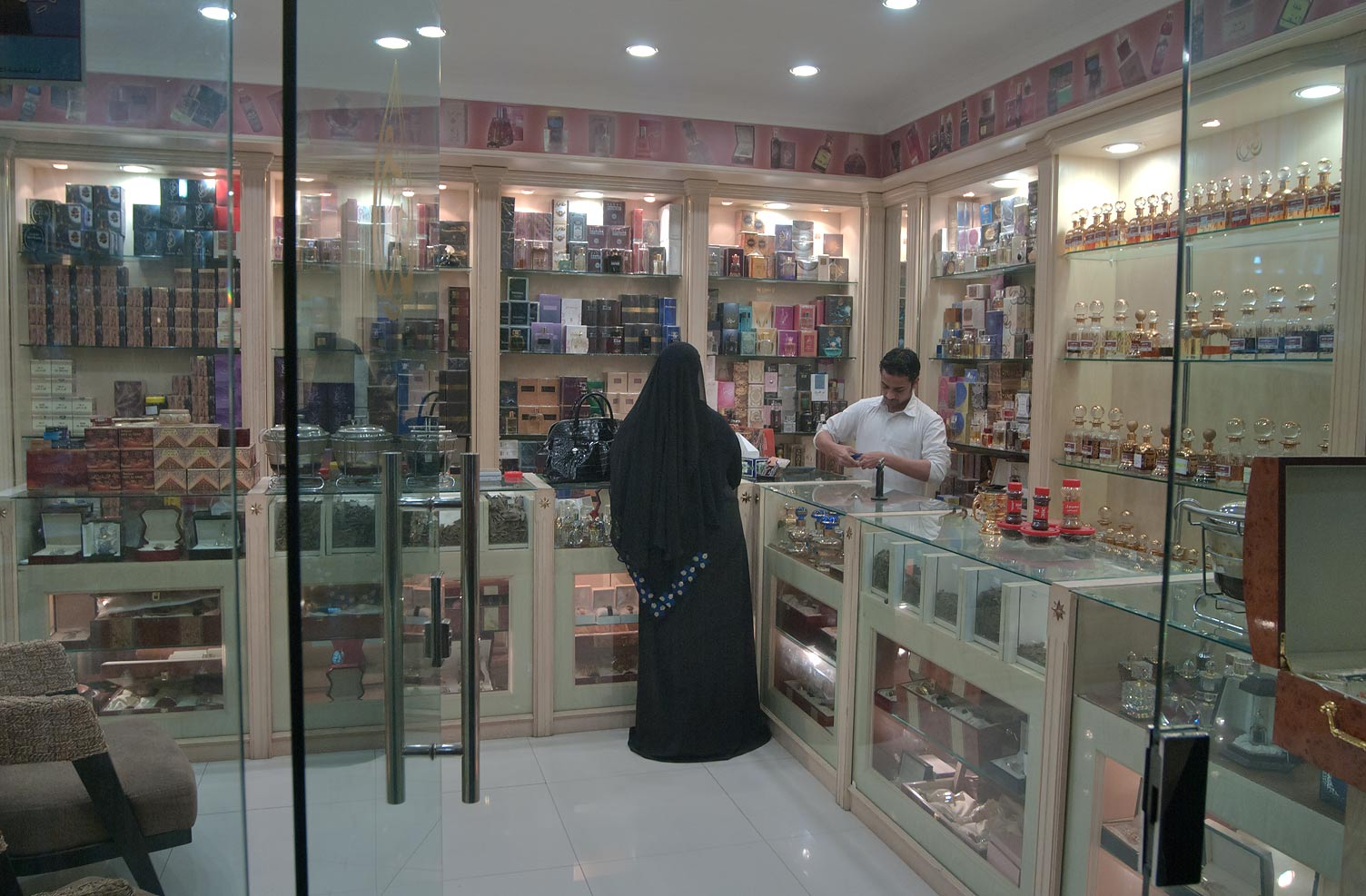
A woman shopping for perfumes in Souq Waqif

Women also attended to their fragrance, using water and sidr to cleanse themselves, and applying aromatic oils such as oud or rose oil to their faces. They enhanced their eyes with stone kohl and used the derm plant to redden their lips and whiten their teeth. Women were familiar with a wide array of perfumes and incense, including attar, civet oil, musk, amber oil, oud, sandalwood oil, and rose oil. Their tools for these fragrances included a spray bottle and an incense burner, known as mabkhara.

== Preservation of traditional clothing ==
National dress is an important status signifier in Qatar and is worn by practically every Qatari citizen. To preserve and document textile manufacturing traditions and the types of clothing and accessories worn by women in Qatar, the Ministry of Culture published a booklet called Qatari Women's Adornment based on fieldwork conducted by The Arab Gulf States Folklore Centre in 1997.

== Clothing restrictions ==
Clothing laws punish and forbid wearing revealing or indecent clothes. A government body enforces the dressing-code law called "Al-Adheed". In 2012, a Qatari NGO organized a campaign of "public decency" after they deemed the government to be too lax in monitoring the wearing of revealing clothes, defining the latter as "not covering shoulders and knees, tight or transparent clothes". The campaign targets foreigners who constitute the majority of Qatar's population.
