= Jacob Abrian =

Lebanese business executive

- Born: Jacob Abrian; February 1, 1994 (age 32); Beirut, Lebanon.
- Occupation: Chief Executive Officer of Arab Fashion Council
- Years active: 2012–present
- Website: jacobabrian.com

Jacob Abrian is the founder and chief executive officer of the Arab Fashion Council (AFC), the world's largest non-profit fashion council as an INGO for Arab World representing the 22 Arabic countries members of the Arab League. He founded the Council at an age of 26 being the youngest founder in the world representing an international authority. In 2015, Abrian together with a group of co-founders of different nationality, founded the Arab Fashion Week, a fashion event hosted in Dubai twice a year. The Arab Fashion Week is known as one of the world's five most important fashion event alongside New York, London, Milan and Paris Fashion Weeks.

Abrian manages the AFC's membership, international partnerships, the council's future vision initiatives such as to nurture and develop the talents of young designers through its strong business alliances and position the Arab World on the international fashion map, and setting up a proper infrastructure of fashion, from retail to commerce and to education. He is the person together with a group of co-founders, behind putting the Arab World, in particular, Dubai on the international map of fashion; after announcing the first Arab Fashion Week to be hosted in Dubai in October 2015. Thanks to his vision Dubai is the only fashion capital to host the Ready-to-wear Couture collection similar to Paris for hosting the Haute Couture.

In April 2018 Abrian, under the Arab Fashion Council, made history by organizing the first fashion week in Riyadh, the capital of Saudi Arabia, in partnership with the General Entertainment Authority under the name of Arab Fashion Week which is traditionally hosted in Dubai twice a year. The Arab Fashion Week in Riyadh has received enormous success and a global attention.

In 2023, Arab Fashion Week was officially rebranded as Dubai Fashion Week, marking a significant milestone in the city's emergence as a global fashion hub. The rebranding was the result of a strategic partnership between the Arab Fashion Council, represented by Abrian, and the Dubai Design District (d3). The success and growing international recognition of Arab Fashion Week played a key role in positioning Dubai on the global fashion map, ultimately leading to this transformation.

Abrian worked directly with Arab Fashion Council and National Chamber of Italian Fashion, Honorary President, HE. Cavalier Mario Boselli and the Board of Directors, which is composed of high calibre professionals and entrepreneurs.

== Prior work ==
Abrian's background wasn't totally relying in the fashion industry. He received his first honorary high-school degree in Life Science in 2007 followed by a short course in Film Making and Fine Arts before he obtained his second honorary master's degree in architecture from the Polytechnic University of Milan in 2014. In 2013, he has been selected to be one of the architects for the EXPO 2015. In 2012 he was scouted to model in Milan where he appeared on Vogue and posed for the world's most renown brands such as Roberto Cavalli, Ermanno Scervino, Moscot, to shortly become the first international male model of Arabic roots.

== Awards ==
In September 2019, Abrian has been honored with the League of Gentlemen Award, for his role and contribution in creating opportunities for Arab talents, at the 9th annual Fashion 4 Development Official First Ladies Luncheon during the 74th session of the United Nations General Assembly in New York, and in celebration of the event the Arab Fashion Council has endorsed a fashion show tribute to Azzedine Alaia and the Alaia Foundation.
