= Clothing in the United Arab Emirates =

Clothing in the United Arab Emirates is similar to that of other Arabic countries and has reflects Bedouin life in the Arabian peninsula. Traditional clothing is designed for comfort in high temperatures and to keep with the Islamic religious beliefs in the country. Emiratis wear veils and long sleeved robes, worn especially in the summer. Clothing that covers more parts of the body from the sunlight can be preferred.

Sandals are the most common footwear for both Emirati women and men.

A social media campaign was started by two Emirati women, Hanan Al Rayes and Asma Al Muhairi, in 2012 to create awareness and educate tourists and expatriates on dressing appropriately, respecting the country's culture and sensibilities.

== Fashion in the UAE ==
Fashion in the UAE has evolved over past decades blending traditional garments with contemporary designs. Dubai, in particular, has emerged as a regional fashion hub, featuring shopping destinations like the Dubai Mall and Mall of the Emirates, which showcase both international luxury brands and local designers. Events such as Dubai Fashion Week and Arab Fashion Week have gained global recognition, highlighting a unique fashion identity where traditional Arab influences meet cutting-edge trends. Emirati designers skillfully merge heritage elements, such as abayas and kanduras, with modern silhouettes, catering to a cosmopolitan audience while preserving cultural roots. The UAE also emphasizes empowering local talent through initiatives like Dubai Design District (d3) and various fashion incubators, providing mentorship, workspace, and international exposure. Sustainability and ethical practices are also increasingly prioritized, with eco-friendly materials, responsible production processes, and recognition through initiatives like the Dubai Sustainable Fashion Awards.

== Gallery ==
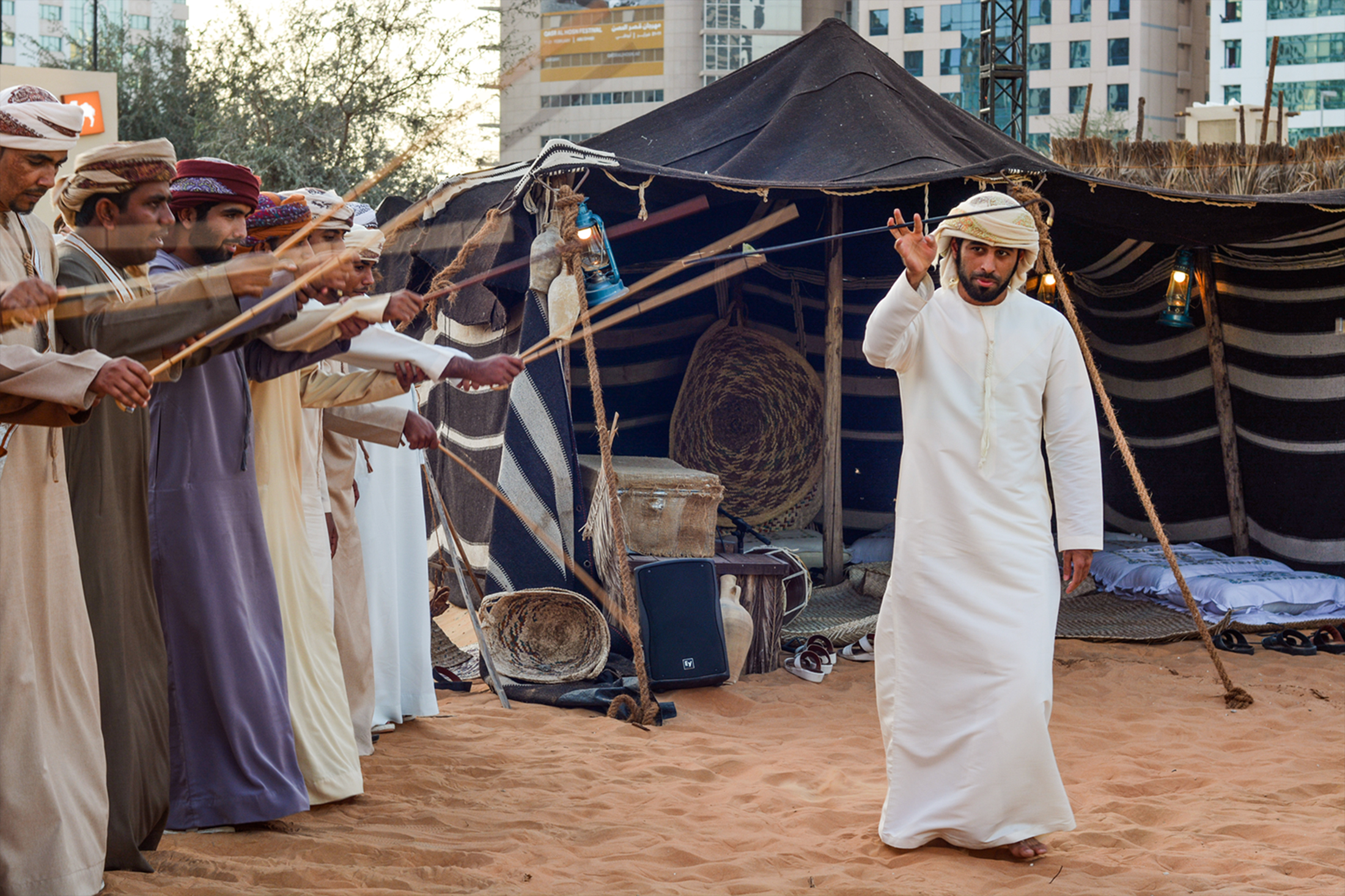
Various styles of Emirati kandoura in winter

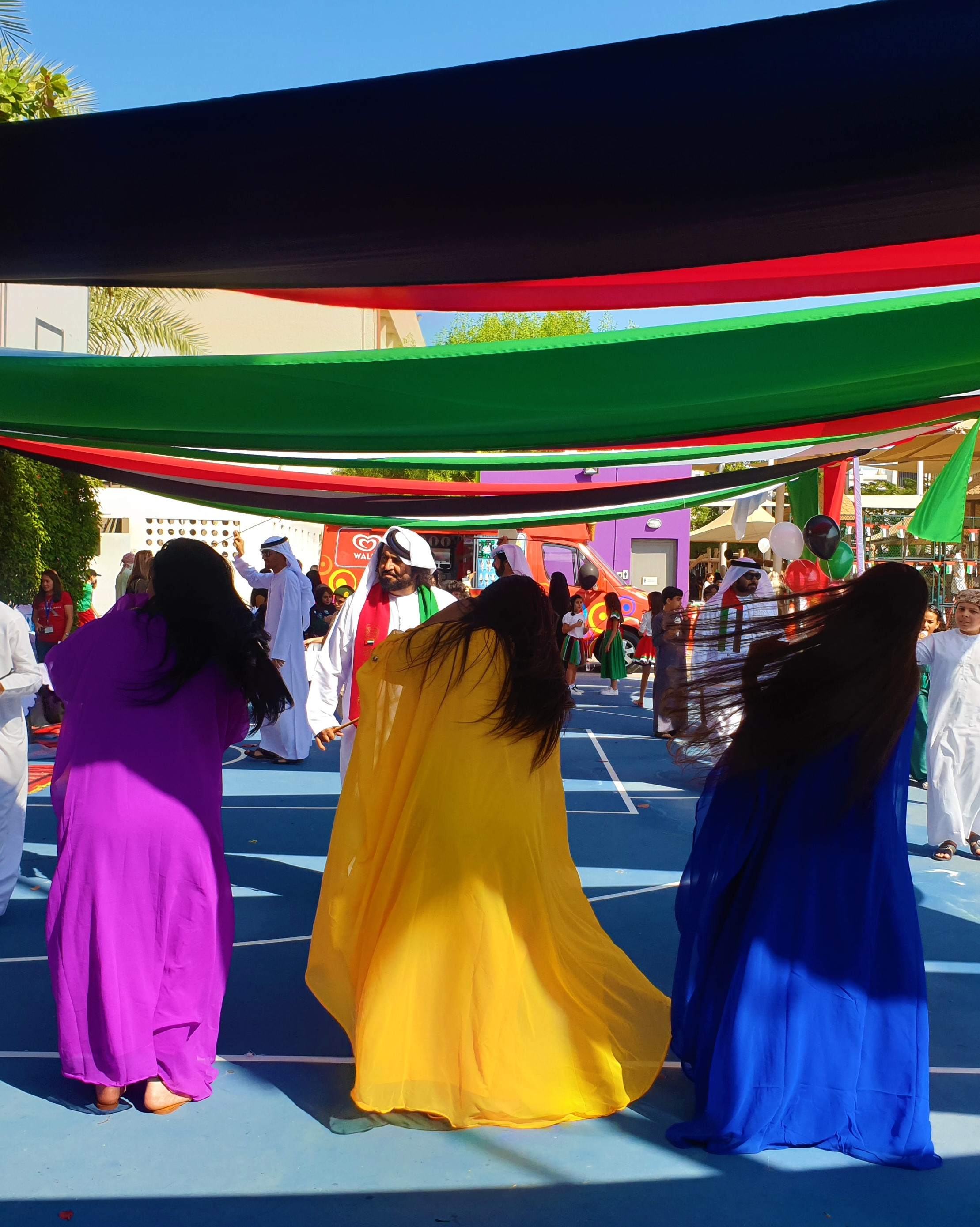
Emirati traditional dresses

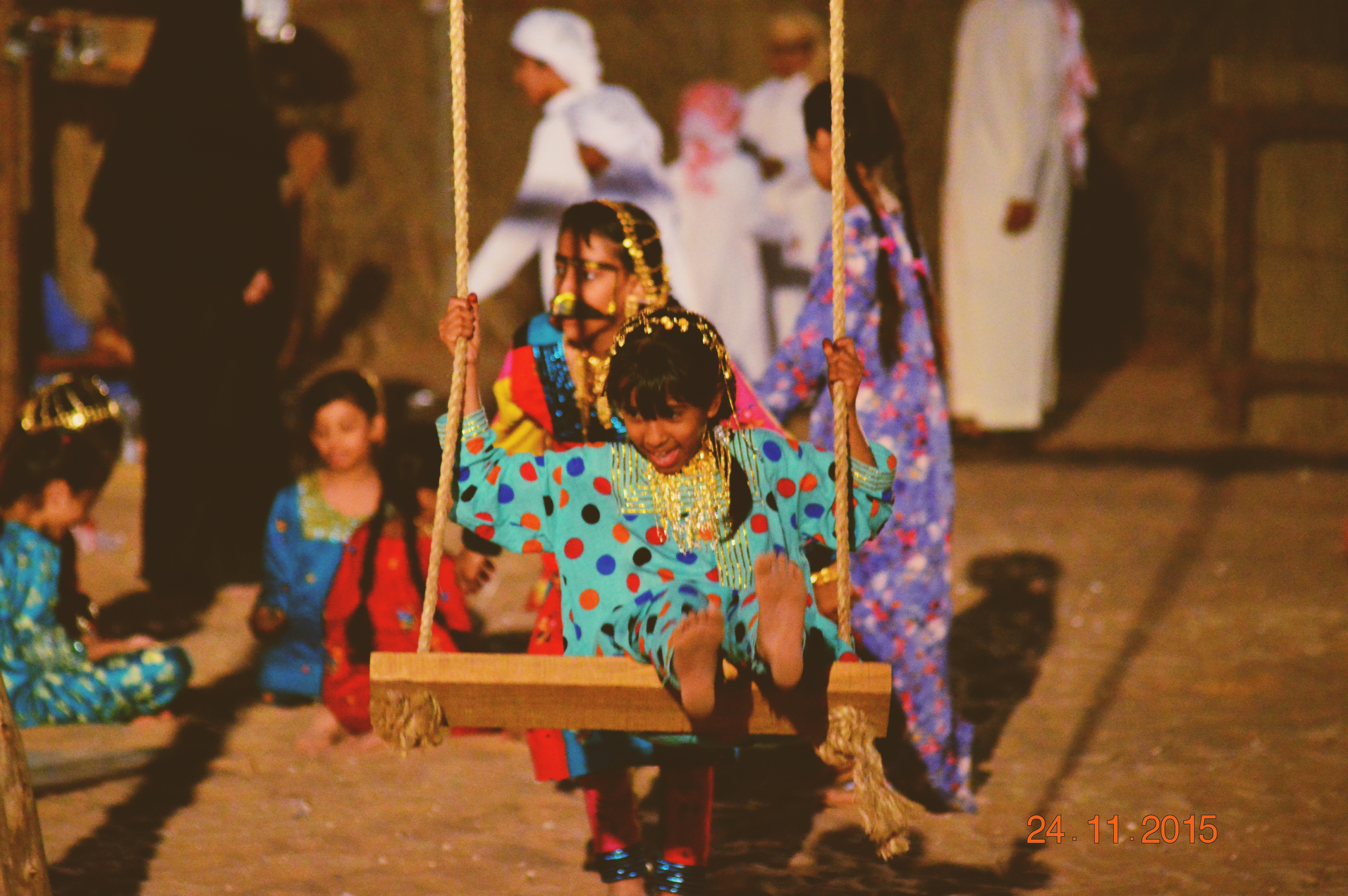
Emirati children playing while wearing traditional dresses

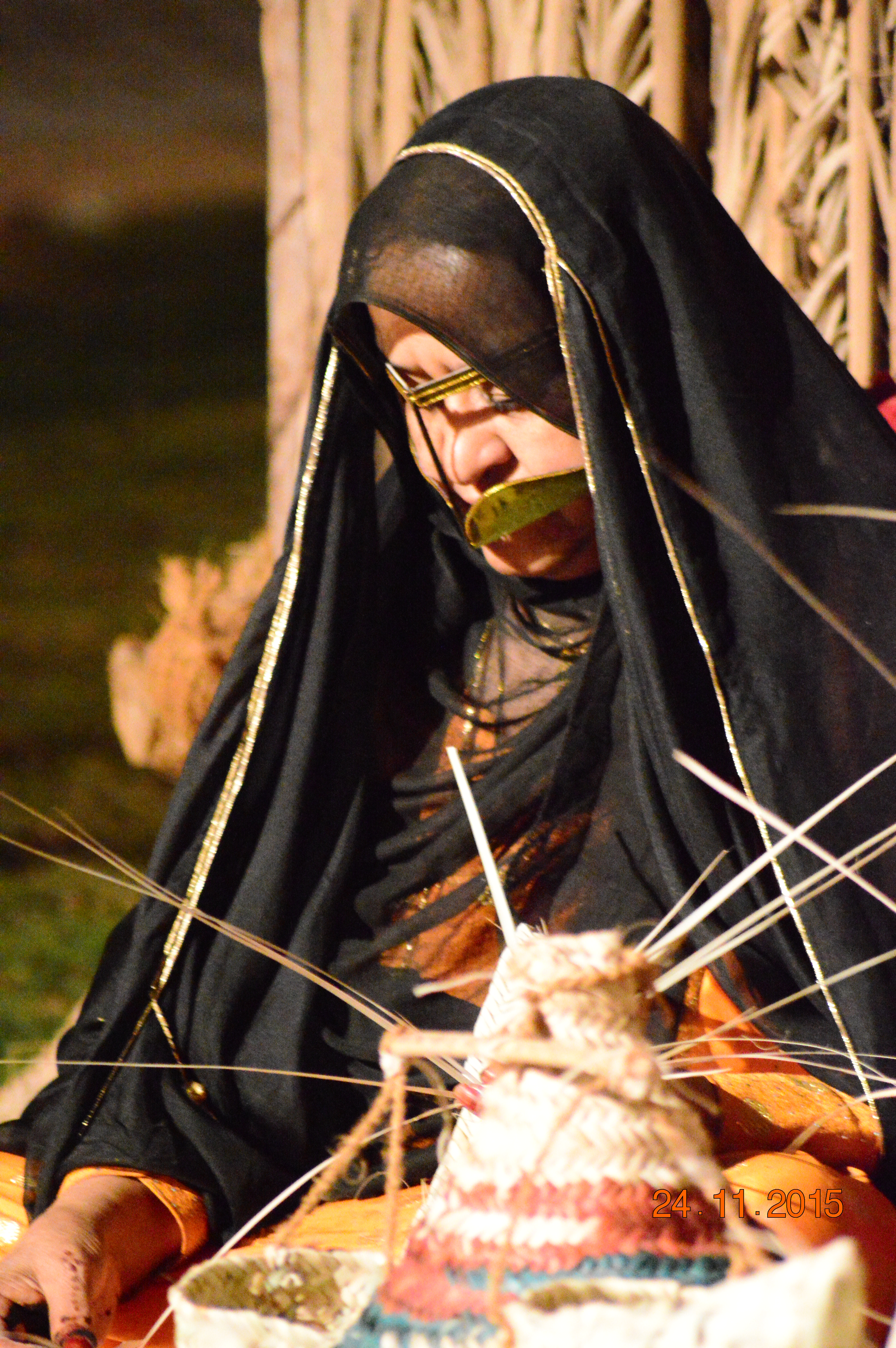
Elderly female wearing the battoulah

== See also ==
- Culture of the United Arab Emirates
- National costume

== Bibliography ==
- Benesh, G. C. (2008). CultureShock! United Arab Emirates: A survival guide to customs and etiquette. Singapore: Marshall Cavendish International (Asia) Ptd Ltd.
