= Sophie Couture =

Azerbaijani couture label

- Industry: Fashion
- Founder: Gunel Babayeva
- Headquarters: Baku, Azerbaijan
- Area served: Worldwide
- Products: Silhouettes, bridal gowns, and evening gowns
- Website: sophiecouture.com

Sophie Couture is a couture label founded by Gunel Babayeva, an Azerbaijani fashion designer.

Sophie Couture is noted for their silhouettes, bridal gowns, and evening gowns.

== History ==
Sophie Couture was founded in 2015 in Baku, Azerbaijan by Gunel Babayeva, with a focus on designing evening and bridal wear.Gunel Babayeva's early sewing experiences under her grandmother's guidance, coupled with an interest in fashion and design, fueled her vision. After earning a degree in economics and starting a family, she chose to pursue her career in fashion. Since its inception, Sophie Couture, has been recognized for its detail-oriented designs. She named it after her first child, Sophia.

== Design process ==
Sophie Couture's fashion collections amalgamate contemporary designs and trends, varied color palettes, and high-grade fabrics.

Sophie Couture prioritizes the selection of materials, the application of advanced knitting techniques, and the inclusion of detailed embroideries and beadwork. It uses various materials during its production process such as silk, lace, and tulle. All pieces are handcrafted within its own workshops, leading to the production of individualized attire.

== Recognition ==
Sophie Couture is recognized in the fashion industry for its contributions to the evening and bridal gowns. It has been recognized in multiple publications and has been worn by celebrities such as Aishwarya Rai Bachchan, Sara Sampaio, Mickey Guyton, Zuri Hall, Coco Jones, Hina Khan, Ani Lorak Holly Willoughby, Michelle Salas, and Regina Todorenko.

Sophie Couture has also been showcased in fashion shows and events such as Arab Fashion Week, the Cannes Film Festival, among others, held in cities such as Baku, Cannes, and Dubai, further increasing its recognition in the fashion industry.
