= Chris Benz =

American fashion designer

- Born: 1982 (age 43–44); Seattle, Washington
- Education: Parsons The New School for Design
- Label: Chris Benz
- Awards: CFDA: Emerging Talent Award & Scholarship (2003);1st Annual FICA Emerging Fur Designer of the Year; The Pantone Special Color Award for Best Use of Color by a Designer (2010)

Chris Benz is an American fashion designer and interior decorator. He gained early recognition as a recipient of a CFDA scholarship while attending Parsons School of Design. Benz interned with Marc Jacobs in college, then worked at J.Crew, before launching his own collection in 2007. His signatures include use of color, texture and prints, as well as subversion of traditional dressmaking codes and techniques. His collection is available in stores throughout United States, Canada, Asia, Europe, and the Middle East. He was inducted into the CFDA in 2009.

Eric Wilson, fashion reporter for The New York Times, singled him out among fashion's "newest darlings" and said the collection "may be the best example of the heightened level of sophistication that is expected of new designers today."

Benz's clothes are frequently featured in Vogue, Elle, Glamour, and other publications. In addition to his own fashion line, Benz has partnered with Moscot, the eyewear company, to design a line of frames, and Lancôme to design the "Chris & Tell" Lipstick. He also has a partnership with Redken.

Benz has made numerous television appearances, included among them as a guest judge on Bravo's The Fashion Show: Ultimate Collection and an appearance on HBO's How to Make It in America. Benz also appeared on Gossip Girl. Chris Benz also had a role in Wes Anderson's 2018 movie Isle of Dogs.

He is also a regular columnist for Fashionista.com.

Benz also created the clothes for the 2012 Barbie for President doll in the Barbie "I Can Be..." line.

Benz collaborated to design character costumes for the animated movie EPIC in 2013.

On October 30, 2014, Benz was appointed Creative Director of Bill Blass which plans to relaunch during the spring of 2016. Benz as Creative Director of Bill Blass is "...planning an e-commerce push, collaborations with up-and-coming designers and established artists, an accessories range and, possibly, a line of home goods." An article republished from The New York Times on October 6, 2020 states that Benz has left the company.
