= Arab Fashion Council =

- مجلس الأزياء العربي
- Abbreviation: AFC
- Purpose: Promoting the Arab fashion Industry worldwide and establishing an economy based on creativity and knowledge.
- Headquarters: Dubai, United Arab Emirates
- Region served: Arab World
- Field: Fashion industry
- Official languages: Arabic & English
- CEO: Jacob Abrian
- Website: arabfashioncouncil.com

The Arab Fashion Council (AFC) (Arabic: مجلس الأزياء العربي ) is the world's largest non-profit fashion council and an INGO for the Arab World, representing the 22 members of the Arab League. This organization is based in Dubai with the main goal of promoting Arab fashion designers internationally, disseminating fashion culture in the region, and positioning the Arab world on the international fashion map. It includes Arab companies and talent within the fashion industry, particularly fashion designers, models, photographers, hair stylists, make-up artists, and art directors. It regulates modeling agencies by creating stringent protocols and strict standards for protecting all the models working in the Middle East region. It also governs the schools of fashion registered under the laws of Arab nations.

== History ==
Its first honorary president was Cav. Mario Boselli,, the former president of Camera Nazionale Della Moda Italiana. On 18 December 2017, the Arab Fashion Council announced from London the opening of its office in Riyadh and organized the first fashion week in the history of the Kingdom of Saudi Arabia under the name "Arab Fashion Week".

On 7 December 2015, Jacob Abrian was elected as chief executive officer for the council, being the youngest appointed CEO for a Council. In 2021, a partnership was established with the Fédération de la Haute Couture et de la Mode, which yielded the first Fashion Week representing male models by showcasing men's wear. This event was a three-day virtual event based in Dubai. The event is scheduled twice annually with other men's fashion week events.

== Activities ==
A landmark activity of the Arab Fashion Council is to organize the twice-yearly prestigious event, Dubai Fashion Week. It is the only official Fashion Week-based show at Dubai and the Arab World that is recognized on the global calendar next to the other big four fashion weeks that are London Fashion Week, Milan Fashion Week, New York Fashion Week, and Paris Fashion Week. Dubai Fashion Week represents all 22 Arab Nations and is hosted at the Dubai Design District. It promotes Arab and foreign designers into the global market where notable fashion brands showcase their various types of dress collections to the public. In its 4th edition, the Arab Fashion Week became the world's main platform for pre-collections and ready-to-wear.

The Riyadh Fashion Week's first edition was hosted at Riyadh in April 2018 and became the first fashion show event in the history of Saudi Arabia. At the 11th edition in June 2020 and the 12th edition in October 2020, the Arab Fashion Council hosted the Dubai Fashion Week virtually as precaution against the spread of COVID-19. In September 2020, the Arab Fashion Council hosted the first Arab designers showroom on the official calendar of Paris Fashion Week, in partnership with the Federation de la Haute Couture et de la Mode.

== Education ==
Arab Fashion Council has partnered with leading fashion institutes and the UNESCO office in Doha, Qatar. It helps them promote fashion education and supports Arab talents by providing a fully covered scholarship for an Arab student after entering an annual competition for studying undergraduate and postgraduate degrees in Dubai.

== See also ==
- British Fashion Council
- Council of Fashion Designers of America
- Fédération française de la couture
- National Chamber of Italian Fashion
- Fashion in Iran
