= Shayla =

Headgear worn by some women of Islamic culture

Shayla (Arabic: شيلة) is an Islamic head covering worn by some Muslim women in the presence of any male outside of their immediate family. It is different from a khimar, because it is usually wrapped and pinned. Sometimes it is worn in the form of a half niqab with part of the face still appearing.

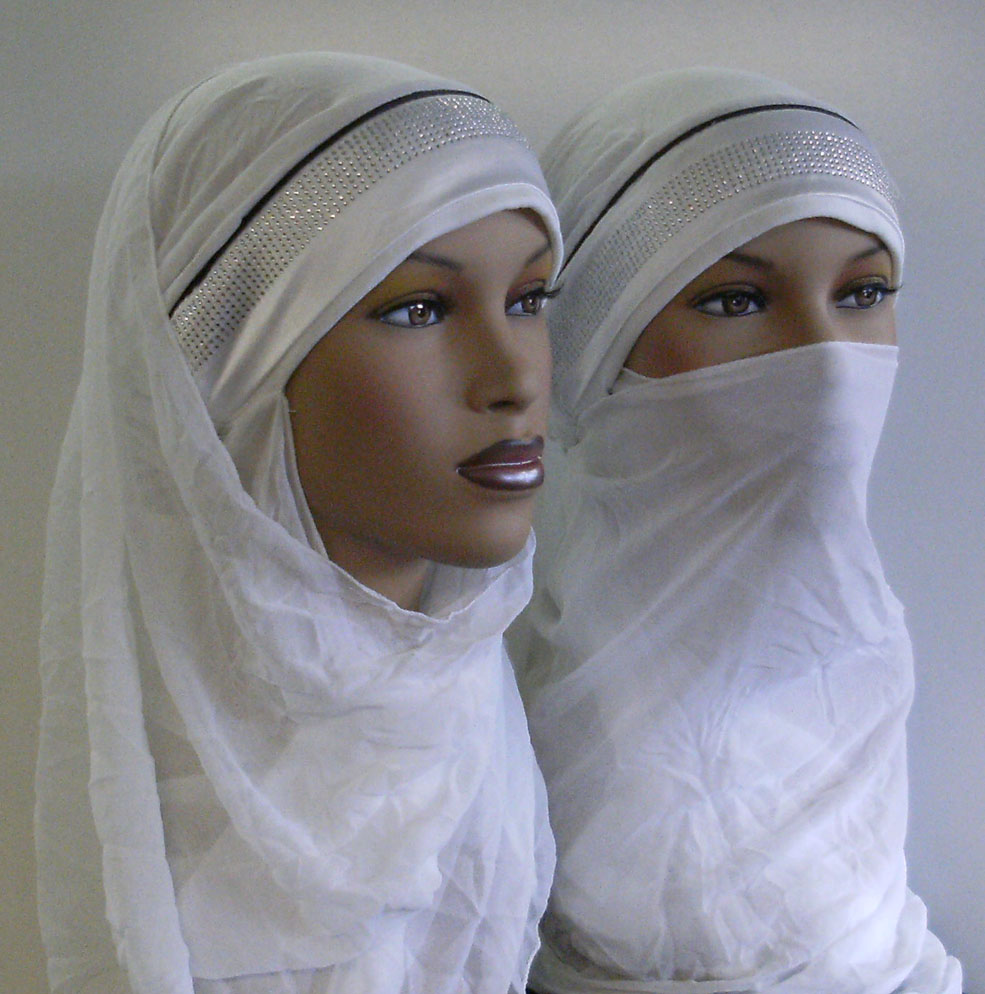
Two mannequins with the left wearing a shayla and the right wearing a niqab

It is traditionally worn by some women in Saudi Arabia and other Arab states of the Persian Gulf.

== Cultural significance ==
It is often worn by Indo-Pakistani women as a cultural symbol rather than for religious reasons. The shayla is particularly meaningful to the Pashtuns.

== See also ==
- Battoulah
- Haik (garment)
