= Moscot =

American eyewear company

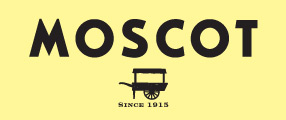

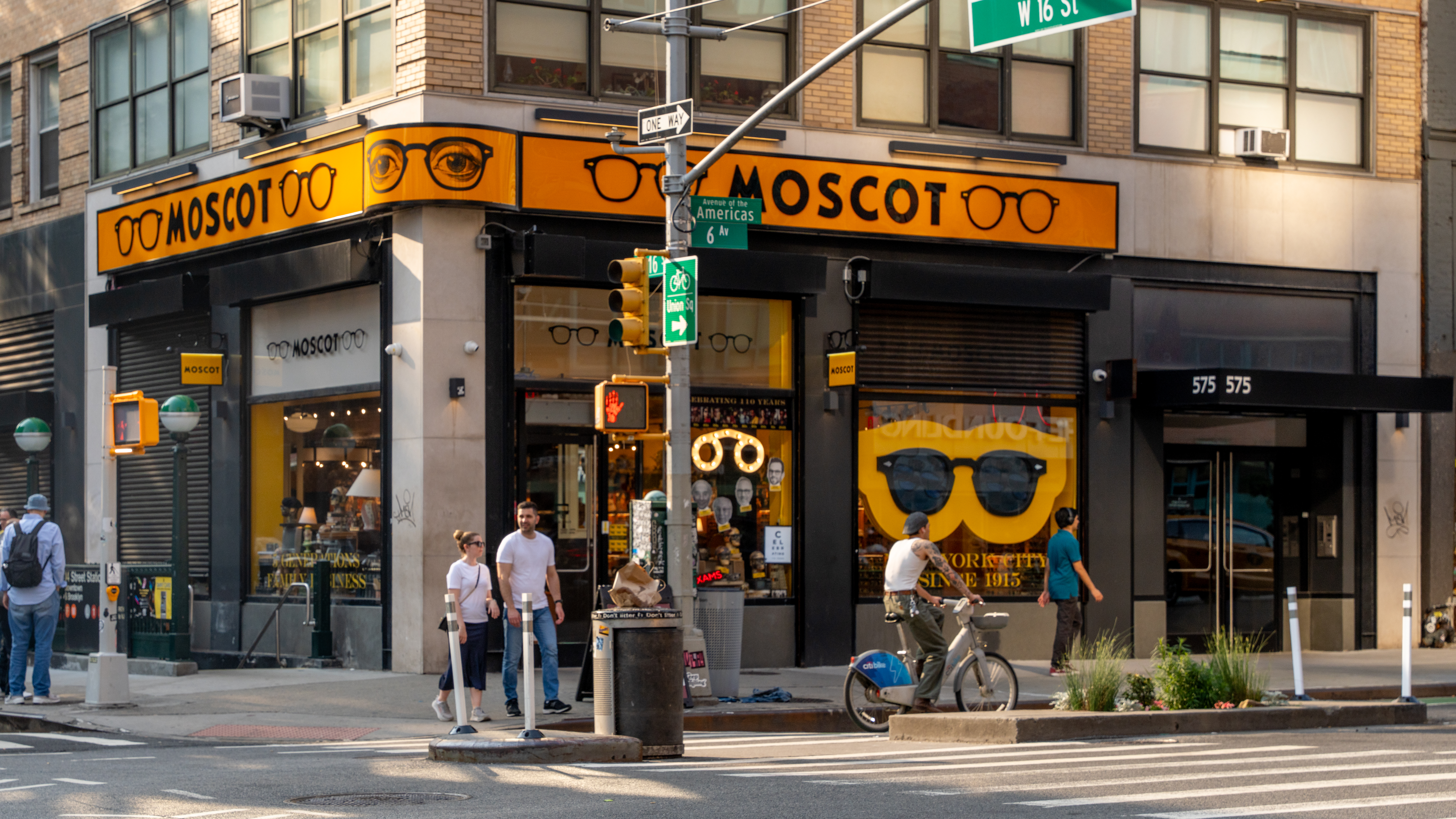
- Moscot store in Manhattan
- Type: Private
- Industry: Eyewear
- Founded: 1915; 111 years ago
- Founder: Hyman Moscot
- Headquarters: Lower East Side, New York City, United States
- Products: Glasses; Sunglasses; Contact lenses
- Services: Eye care services
- Owner: Moscot family
- Website: moscot.com

Moscot is an American eyewear company based in New York City. Founded on Manhattan's Lower East Side in 1915 by Hyman Moscot, it developed from a neighborhood optical shop into a family-owned eyewear business with retail locations in the United States and internationally. The business remains owned and operated by members of the Moscot family.

== History ==
=== Early history ===
Hyman Moscot, an Eastern European Jewish immigrant, arrived in New York around the turn of the 20th century and began selling ready-made eyeglasses from a pushcart on Orchard Street. In 1915, he opened a permanent optical shop on Rivington Street on the Lower East Side.

His son Solomon "Sol" Moscot entered the business as a teenager and later took over its operations. In the mid-1930s, the shop moved to 118 Orchard Street, at the corner of Delancey Street, where it remained for several decades.

Sol's son Joel Moscot began running the business in 1951. The fourth generation entered the company in the late 20th century: Harvey Moscot trained as an optometrist at the New England College of Optometry, while his brother Kenny Moscot joined the business in 1991. In 1996, the company expanded beyond the Lower East Side with a second Manhattan location near Union Square.

=== Expansion and rebranding ===
After Joel Moscot retired in 2003, the business shortened its name from Sol Moscot to Moscot and expanded its own line of eyewear. The company drew on frame designs and styles preserved in its archives, including designs based on mid-20th-century eyewear.

In 2013, Moscot moved its Lower East Side store from 118 Orchard Street to 108 Orchard Street. That year, it also opened a shop in Cobble Hill, its first location outside Manhattan.

Harvey Moscot's son Zack Moscot joined the business full-time in 2013 after studying industrial and product design at the University of Michigan. He represents the fifth generation of the family involved in the company and later became its chief design officer.

In 2021, Moscot relocated its Lower East Side flagship to 94 Orchard Street. The move marked the first time the company owned the building housing its flagship store. By that time, the company had also opened stores outside the United States, including locations in London, Tokyo, Seoul, Amsterdam, Toronto and Copenhagen.

In October 2022, Moscot opened its first Swiss store in Zürich. The location was reported as the company's 20th shop worldwide.

== Eyewear and design ==
Moscot produces optical frames and sunglasses. In the early 2000s, the company expanded its proprietary eyewear line using styles based in part on designs preserved in its archives. One of its best-known frames is the Lemtosh, a rounded acetate design associated with the company's mid-century aesthetic.

The company has also produced limited-edition eyewear and collaborations with designers, musicians and other creative figures. In 2008, Moscot worked with fashion designer Chris Benz on a limited edition of its Nebb frame.

== Cultural associations ==
Moscot eyewear has appeared in film and has been worn by actors, musicians and other public figures. A 2007 New York Times article described the company's frames as part of a broader revival of thick-rimmed eyewear in fashion.

Actor Justin Theroux was a longtime customer and was associated with a Moscot frame based on the eyewear worn by his character in the 2001 film Mulholland Drive.

In 2011, Moscot released a limited-edition frame created with photographer Terry Richardson.

In 2014, the company collaborated with Tariq "Black Thought" Trotter of The Roots on the Grunya frame.

Johnny Depp wore Moscot's Lemtosh frame in the 2004 film Secret Window. The frame subsequently became one of the company's more widely recognized designs.

== Retail ==
Moscot operates stores in New York City and other markets in the United States, Europe, Asia, Canada and Australia. Its Lower East Side flagship is located at 94 Orchard Street.
