= Battoulah =

Metallic-looking mask traditionally worn by Muslim women

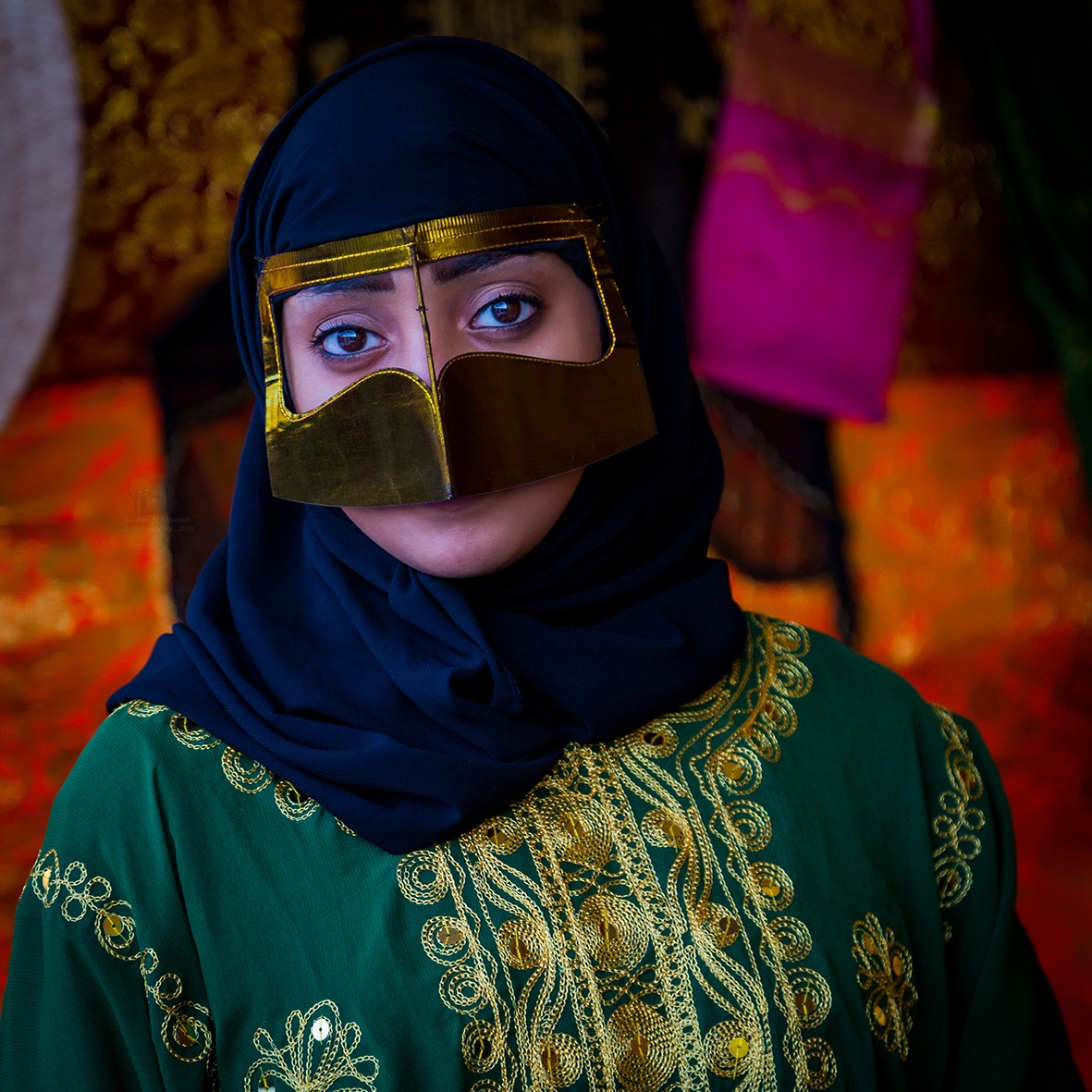
A Khaleeji woman wearing the battoulah.

Battoulah (Arabic: بطوله, romanized: baṭṭūleh; Persian: بتوله), also called Gulf Burqah (Arabic: البرقع الخليجي), (Note: Other names include al-burghu, burqué, boregheh) is a metallic-looking fashion mask traditionally worn by Khaleeji Arab and Bandari Persian Muslim women in the area around the Persian Gulf.

The mask is mainly worn in Bahrain, Kuwait, Oman, Qatar, the United Arab Emirates as well as some parts of eastern Saudi Arabia and southern Iran. The mask usually indicates that the wearer is married. Historically, it was also used to fool enemies into thinking that the women they spied from a distance were actually men.

== Origin ==
The origin of the battoulah is unknown. Multiple theories exist on where it may have originated. It is thought to have entered the Eastern Arabian Peninsula from Gujarat in late 18th century.

=== Oral traditions about the origin ===
Many Arab bedouins consider the Mutayr tribe the creators of the Battoulah (or burqa’). According to bedouin oral tradition, A father was preparing to marry his daughter off to a man she did not desire. Unable to refuse openly, the girl decided to create a solution. She cut a piece of black cloth with uneven eyeholes to conceal her face, attaching it securely. To complement the look, she added a loose white cloth around her legs for additional coverage. When she appeared in front of her potential suitor, her unusual appearance shocked him, and the marriage proposal was rejected.

This invention gained popularity within the Mutayr tribe and later spread to other tribes in the Arabian Peninsula. It is claimed that this event occurred around 1870 CE in a famous poem among the bedouins.

== Variants ==
Multiple variants of the battoulah exist, and some are specific to cities and regions. The "Zabeel cut" design has a narrow top and a broad, curved bottom, and is worn in Dubai and Abu Dhabi. The variant worn in Sharjah resembles the Zabeel cut, but is shaped so the top of the mask is inclined forwards. The Al Ain design features both a narrow top and bottom. The Bahraini and Qatari burqa is square. In Oman and Fujairah it is very large and broader at the top with a tip that goes beyond the forehead. In neighbouring Saudi Arabia, the niqab is worn instead. In southern provinces of Iran, Shia women wear red rectangular masks, while those of Sunni women are black or indigo with gold, similar to the mask worn in the Arabian peninsula. In Qeshm, the masks were designed centuries ago to fool invaders, so they would mistake women for male soldiers.

The wearing of battouleh is declining among the younger generation.

== Gallery ==
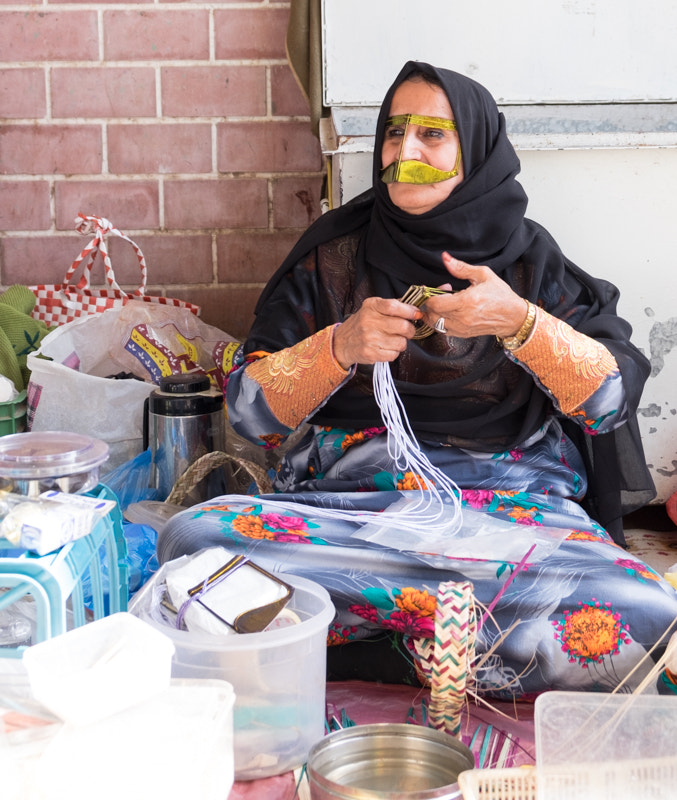
A woman wearing the Battoulah in the United Arab Emirates.

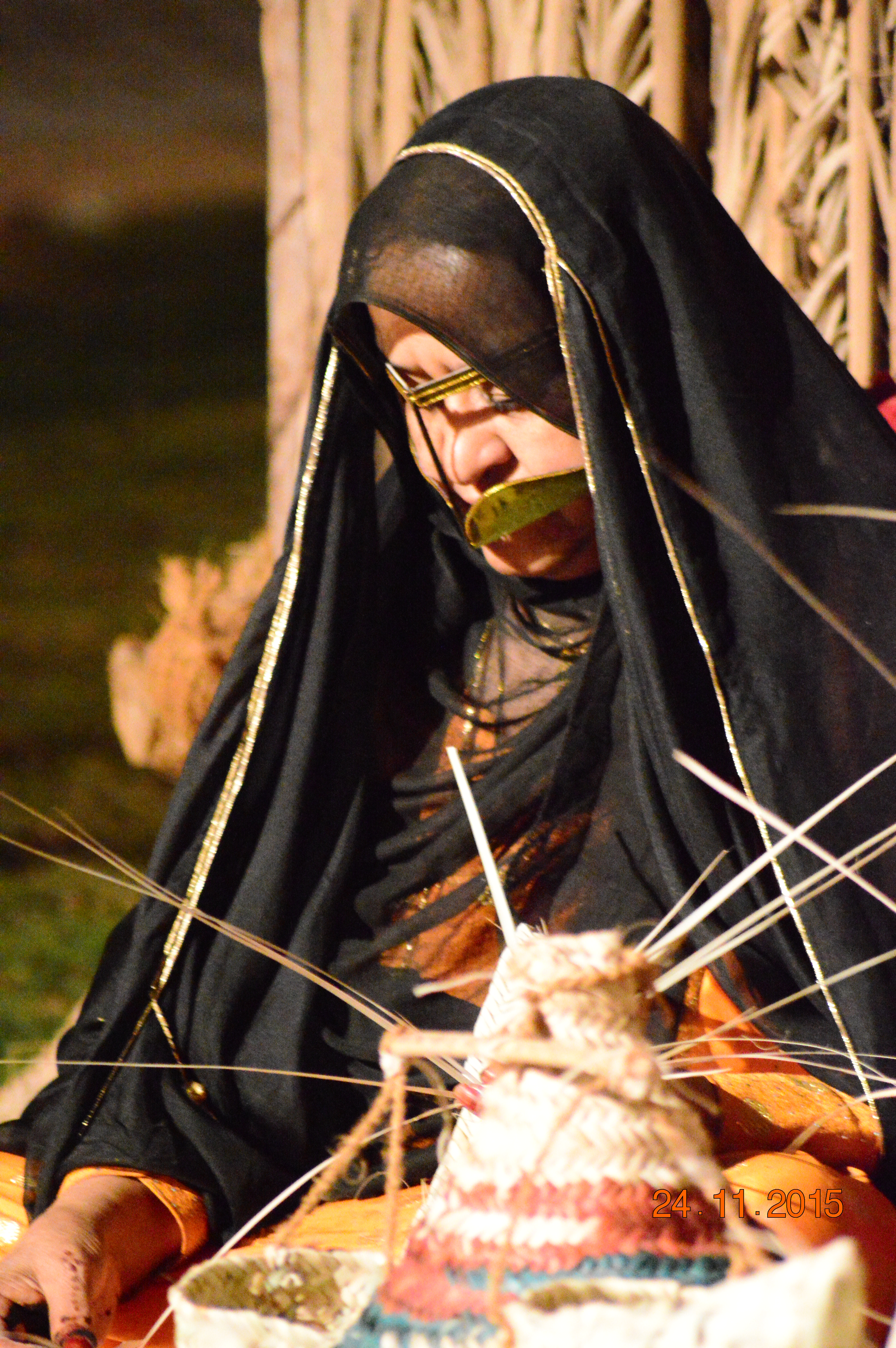
An elderly woman wearing the battoulah in the United Arab Emirates.

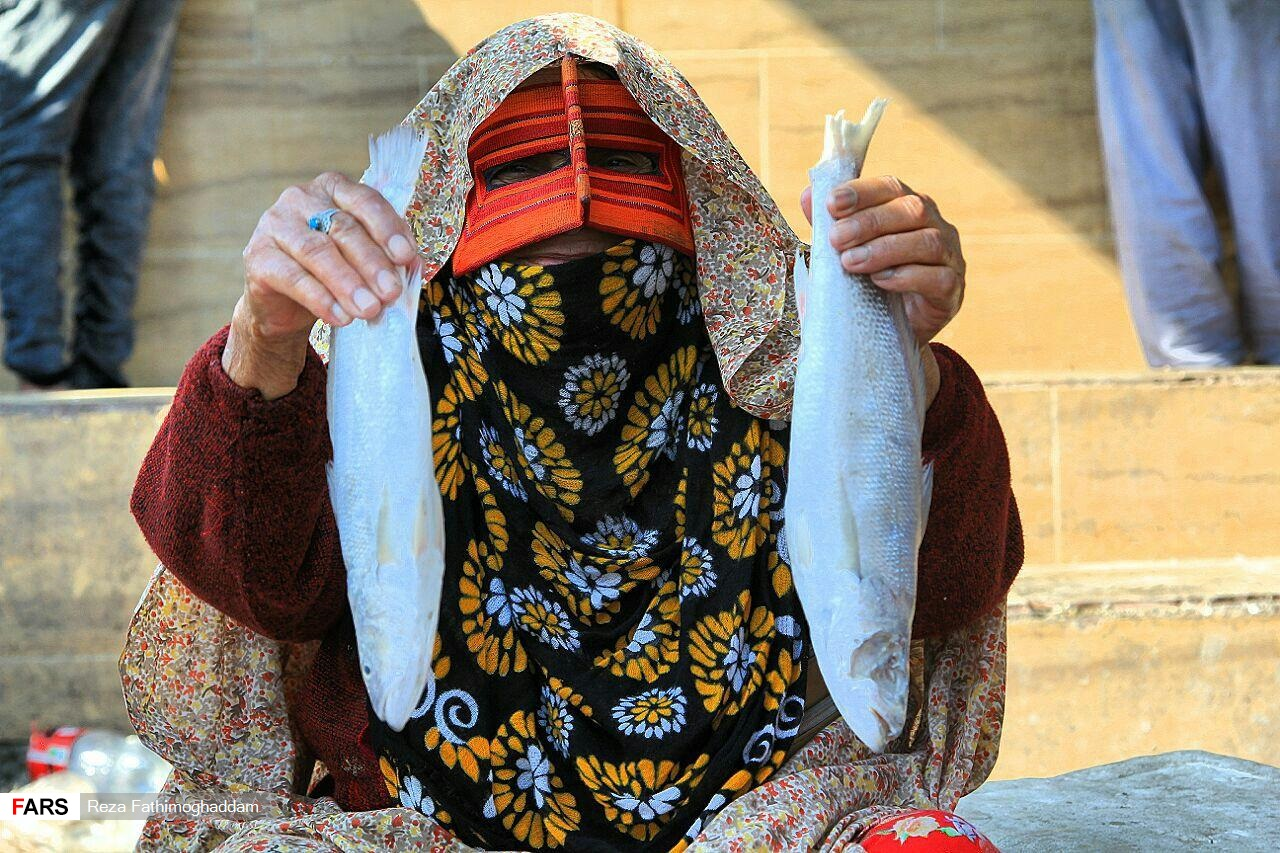
A woman wearing the Battoulah in Bandar Abbas fish market.

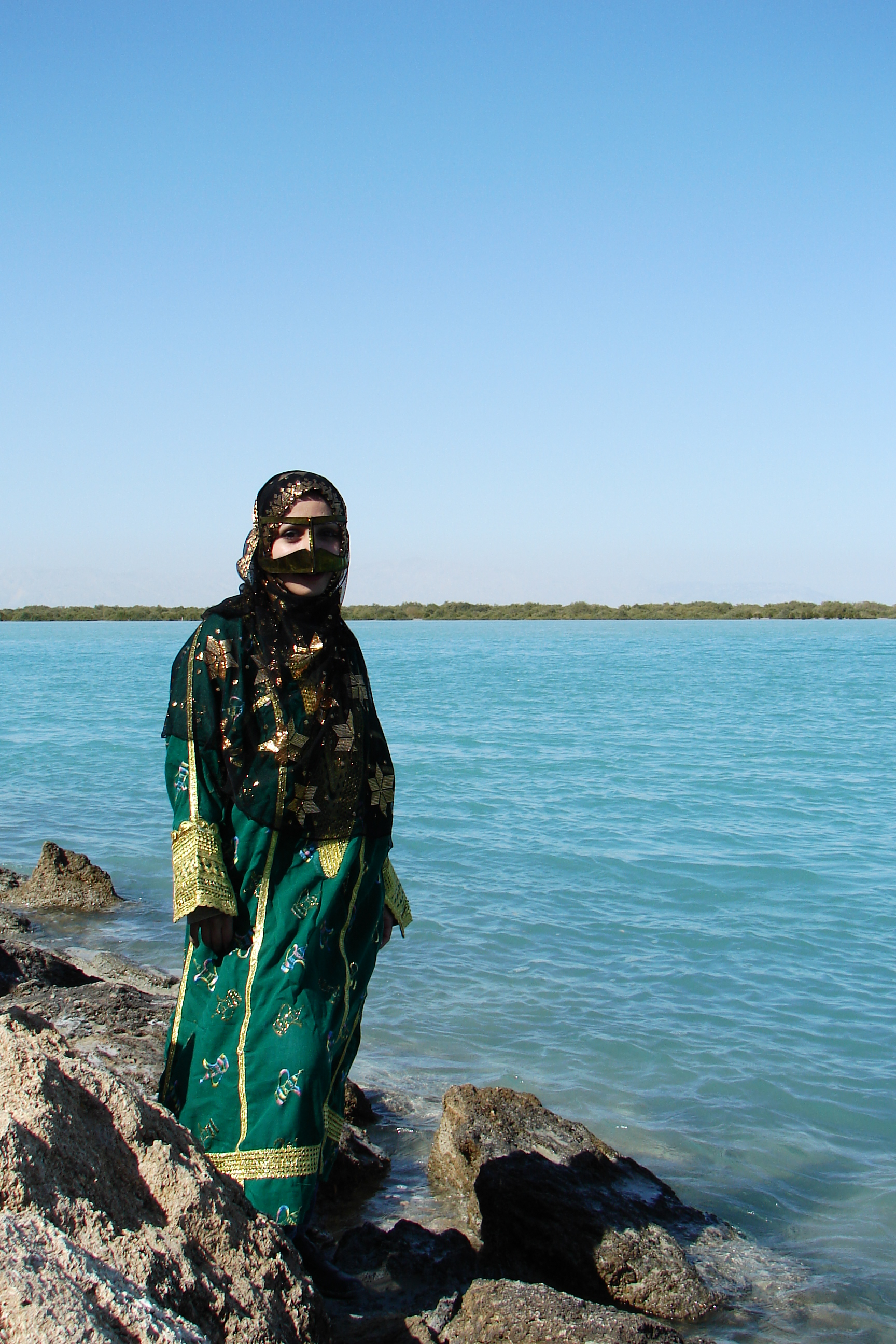
A woman in Qeshm Island wearing a Battoulah

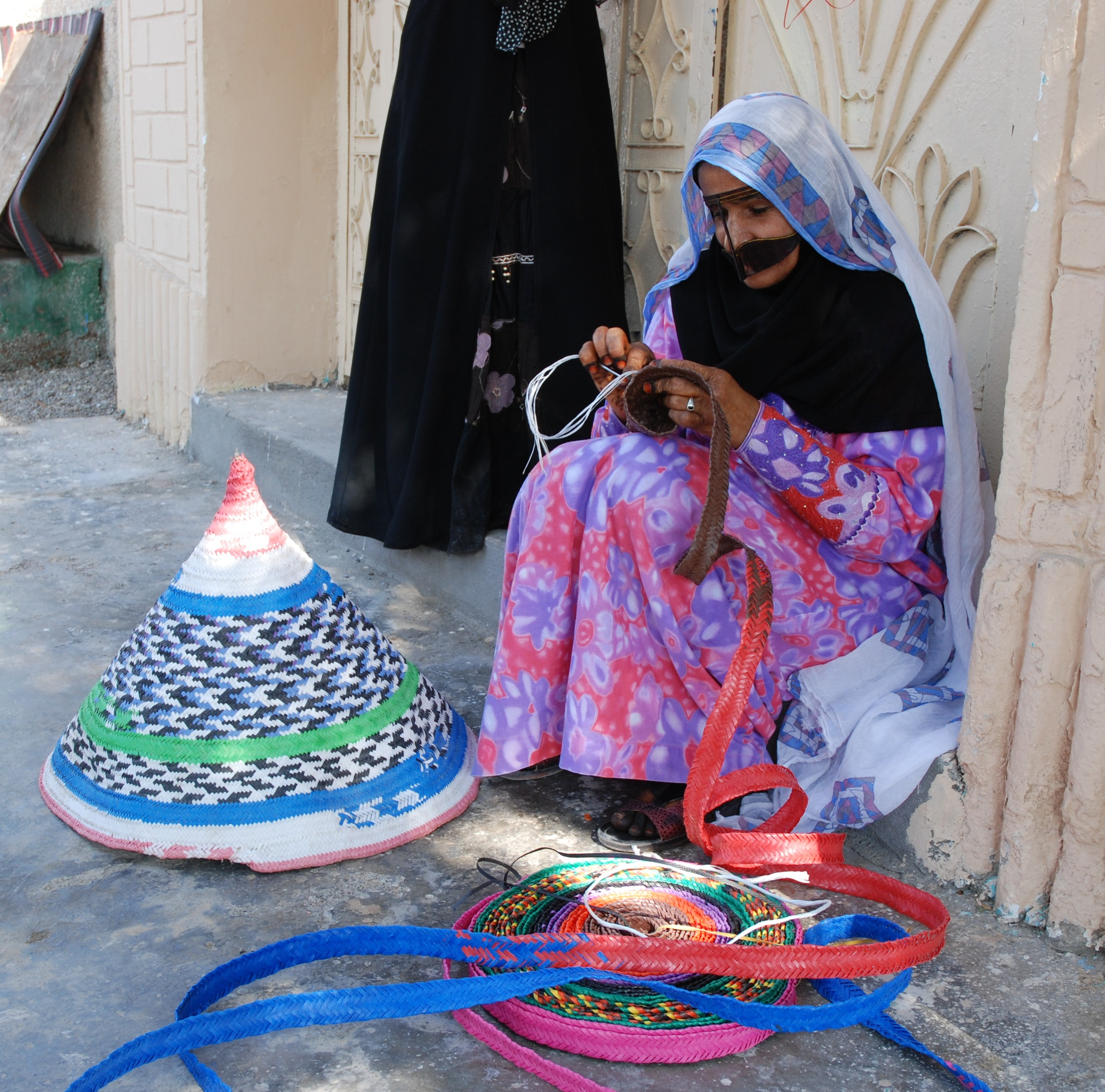
An elderly woman in Oman wearing the Battoulah.

== See also ==
- Alasho
- Shayla
- Haik (garment)
