= Dubai Fashion Week =

Fashion Week

- Locations: Dubai, United Arab Emirates
- Organizer: Arab Fashion Council and Dubai Design District
- Website: http://www.dubaifashionweek.org

Dubai Fashion Week is the official fashion week of Dubai, United Arab Emirates. Upcoming women's and men's autumn/winter fashions are showcased in March of each year, and upcoming women's spring/summer fashions are showcased in October of each year, while upcoming spring/summer fashions are showcased in June of each year.

Dubai Fashion Week is one of the world's five most important fashion weeks alongside London Fashion Week, Milan Fashion Week, Paris Fashion Week, and New York Fashion Week.

== History and operations ==
Dubai Fashion Week was founded on 7 February 2023 by Arab Fashion Council by fixing a strategic partnership with Dubai Design District. The schedule begins with London, Milan, Paris, and New York, ending with Dubai as the evolution of the already existing Arab Fashion Week, founded by the Arab Fashion Council in 2015. In partnership with Dubai Design District, Dubai Fashion Week is organized by Arab Fashion Council, a non-profit organization that is responsible for hosting fashion event-based shows in Dubai.

== Designers ==
The Dubai Fashion Week has seen participation by both Asian and Non-Asian talent. Guest designers, who have previously been included in the Dubai Fashion Week calendar, include names such as Iris Wan Herpen, Jean Paul Gaultier, Antonio Marras, Blumarine, and Moschino.
