= List of Azerbaijani-language poets =

The following is a list of Azerbaijani-language poets.

== Republic of Azerbaijan ==
- Ashig Alasgar
- Mammad Araz
- Hamid Arzulu
- Aşık Khanlar
- Babi Badalov
- Abbasgulu Bakikhanov
- Vagif Bayatly Oner
- Mirvarid Dilbazi
- Piruz Dilenchi
- Teymur Elchin
- Fuzûlî
- Fikrat Goja
- Madina Gulgun
- Mahammad Hadi
- Izzeddin Hasanoglu
- Almas Ildyrym
- Hamlet Isakhanli
- Jafar Jabbarly
- Jafargulu agha Javanshir
- Ahmad Javad
- Huseyn Javid
- Nusrat Kasamanli
- Mikayil Mushfig
- Imadaddin Nasimi
- Khurshidbanu Natavan
- Ali Nazmi
- Mammed Said Ordubadi
- Baba Punhan
- Suleyman Rustam
- Mirza Alakbar Sabir
- Abbas Sahhat
- Bahar Shirvani
- Seyid Azim Shirvani
- Khalil Rza Uluturk
- Mehdigulu Khan Vafa
- Molla Panah Vagif
- Bakhtiyar Vahabzadeh
- Aliagha Vahid
- Mirza Shafi Vazeh
- Molla Vali Vidadi
- Samad Vurgun
- Gasim bey Zakir
- Hikmat Ziya

== Iranian Azerbaijan ==
- Kishvari
- Piruz Dilenchi
- Madina Gulgun
- Habib Saher
- Ismail I
- Habibi
- Mohammad-Hossein Shahriar
