= Azerbaijani literature =

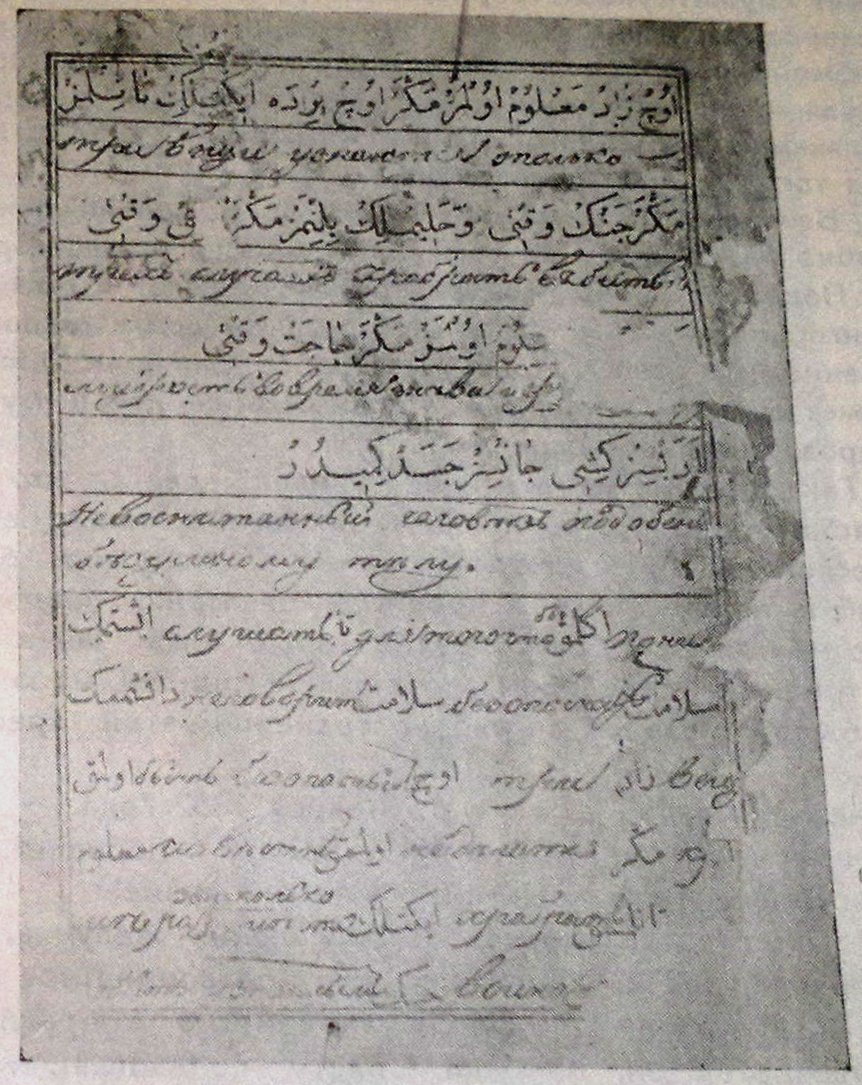
Page from the "Tatar chrestomathy of Azerbaijani dialect" by Mirza Shafi Vazeh

Azerbaijani literature (Azerbaijani: Azərbaycan ədəbiyyatı, آذربایجان ادبیاتی) is written in Azerbaijani, a Turkic language, which is the official state language of the Republic of Azerbaijan, where the North Azerbaijani variety is spoken. It is also natively spoken in Iran, where the South Azerbaijani variety is used, and is particularly spoken in the northwestern historic region of Azerbaijan. Azerbaijani is also spoken natively in Russia (especially Dagestan), Georgia and Turkey. While the majority of Azerbaijani people live in Iran, modern Azerbaijani literature is overwhelmingly produced in the Republic of Azerbaijan, where the language has official status. Three scripts are used for writing the language: Azerbaijani Latin script in the Republic of Azerbaijan, Arabic script in Iran and Cyrillic script formerly used in Soviet Azerbaijan.

The earliest development of Azerbaijani literature is closely associated with Anatolian Turkish, written in Perso-Arabic script. Examples of its detachment date to the 14th century or earlier. Several major authors helped to develop Azerbaijani literature from the 14th century until the 17th century and poetry figures prominently in their works. Towards the end of the 19th century, popular literature such as newspapers began to be published in Azerbaijani language. The production of written works in Azerbaijani was banned in Soviet Azerbaijan Stalin's "Red Terror" campaign targeted thousands of Azerbaijani writers, journalists, teachers, intellectuals and others and resulted in the changing of the Azerbaijani alphabet into one with a Cyrillic alphabet.

Modern Azerbaijani literature is almost exclusively produced in the Republic of Azerbaijan and despite being widely spoken in Iran, Azerbaijani is not formally taught in schools nor are publications in Azerbaijani easily available.

== The two traditions of Azerbaijani literature ==
Throughout most of its history, Azerbaijani literature has been rather sharply divided into two rather different traditions, neither of which exercised much influence upon the other until the 19th century. The first of these two traditions is Azerbaijani folk literature, and the second is Azerbaijani written literature.

For most of the history of Azerbaijani literature, the salient difference between the folk and the written traditions has been the variety of language employed. The folk tradition, by and large, was oral and remained free of the influence of Persian and Arabic literature, and consequently of those literatures' respective languages. In folk poetry—which is by far the tradition's dominant genre—this basic fact led to two major consequences in terms of poetic style:

- The poetic meters employed in the folk poetic tradition were different, being quantitative (i.e., syllabic) verse, as opposed to the qualitative verse employed in the written poetic tradition;
- The basic structural unit of folk poetry became the quatrain (Azerbaijani: dördmisralı) rather than the couplets (Azerbaijani: beyt) more commonly employed in written poetry.

Furthermore, Azerbaijani folk poetry has always had an intimate connection with song—most of the poetry was, in fact, expressly composed so as to be sung—and so became to a great extent inseparable from the tradition of Azerbaijani folk music.

The standard poetic forms—for poetry was as much the dominant genre in the written tradition as in the folk tradition—were derived either directly from the Persian literary tradition (the qəzəl غزل; the məsnəvi مثنوی), or indirectly through Persian from the Arabic (the qəsidə قصيده). However, the decision to adopt these poetic forms wholesale led to two important further consequences: The poetic meters (Azerbaijani: aruz) of Persian poetry were adopted;

- Persian and Arabic-based words were brought into the Azerbaijani language in great numbers, as Turkic words rarely worked well within the system of Persian poetic meter. This style of writing under Persian and Arabic influence came to be known as "Divan literature" (Azerbaijani: divan ədəbiyyatı), dîvân (ديوان) being a Persian originated Azerbaijani word referring to the collected works of a poet.

== Azerbaijani folk literature ==
Azerbaijani folk literature is an oral tradition deeply rooted, in its form, in Central Asian nomadic traditions. However, in its themes, Azerbaijani folk literature reflects the problems peculiar to a settling (or settled) people who have abandoned the nomadic lifestyle.One example of this is the series of folktales surrounding the figure of Keloğlan, a young boy beset with the difficulties of finding a wife, helping his mother to keep the family house intact, and dealing with the problems caused by his neighbors. Another example is the rather mysterious figure of Nasreddin, a trickster who often plays jokes, of a sort, on his neighbors.

=== The epic tradition ===
The Turkic epic has its roots in the Central Asian epic tradition that gave rise to the Book of Dede Korkut. The form developed from the oral traditions of the Oghuz Turks influenced Azeri literature. Turkic epics like Alpamysh are popular among Azerbaijanis.

The Book of Dede Korkut was the primary element of the Azerbaijani epic tradition in the Caucasus and Anatolia for several centuries. Concurrent to the Book of Dede Korkut was the so-called Turkic Epic of Köroğlu, which concerns the adventures of Rüşen Ali ("Köroğlu", or "son of the blind man") as he exacted revenge for the blinding of his father. The origins of this epic are somewhat more mysterious than those of the Book of Dede Korkut: many believe it to have arisen in sometime between the 15th and 17th centuries; more reliable testimony, though, seems to indicate that the story is nearly as old as that of the Book of Dede Korkut, dating from around the dawn of the 11th century. Complicating matters somewhat is the fact that Köroğlu is also the name of a poet of the aşıq/ozan tradition.

=== Folk poetry ===
The folk poetry tradition in Azerbaijani literature, as indicated above, was strongly influenced by the Islamic Sufi and Shia traditions. Furthermore, as partly evidenced by the prevalence of the still existent aşıq/ozan tradition, the dominant element in Turkic folk poetry has always been song. The development of folk poetry in Turkic —which began to emerge in the 13th century with such important Turkish writers as Yunus Emre, Sultan Veled, and Şeyyâd Hamza—was given a great boost when, on 13 May 1277, Karamanoğlu Mehmet Bey declared Turkish the official state language of Anatolia's powerful Karamanid state; subsequently, many of the tradition's greatest poets would continue to emerge from this region.

There are, broadly speaking, two traditions of Azerbaijani folk poetry:

- the aşıq tradition, which—although much influenced by religion, as mentioned above—was for the most part a secular tradition;
- the explicitly religious tradition, which emerged from the gathering places (təkyəs) of the Sufi religious orders and Shia groups.

Much of the poetry and song of the aşıq/ozan tradition, being almost exclusively oral until the 19th century, remains anonymous. There are, however, a few well-known aşıqs from before that time whose names have survived together with their works: the aforementioned Köroğlu (16th century); Karacaoğlan (1606–1689), who may be the best-known of the pre-19th century aşıqs; Dadaloğlu (1785–1868), who was one of the last of the great aşıqs before the tradition began to dwindle somewhat in the late 19th century; and several others. The aşıqs were essentially minstrels who travelled through Anatolia performing their songs on the bağlama, a mandolin-like instrument whose paired strings are considered to have a symbolic religious significance in Alevi/Bektashi culture. Despite the decline of the aşıq/ozan tradition in the 19th century, it experienced a significant revival in the 20th century thanks to such outstanding Turkish figures as Aşık Veysel Şatıroğlu (1894–1973), Aşık Mahzuni Şerif (1938–2002), Neşet Ertaş (1938–2012), and many others.

The explicitly religious folk tradition of təkyə literature shared a similar basis with the aşıq/ozan tradition in that the poems were generally intended to be sung, generally in religious gatherings, making them somewhat akin to Western hymns (Azerbaijani ilahi). One major difference from the aşıq/ozan tradition, however, is that—from the very beginning—the poems of the təkyə tradition were written down. This was because they were produced by revered religious figures in the literate environment of the təkyə, as opposed to the milieu of the aşıq/ozan tradition, where the majority could not read or write.

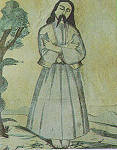
Kaygusuz Abdal

The explicitly religious folk tradition of təkyə literature shared a similar basis with the aşıq/ozan tradition in that the poems were generally intended to be sung, generally in religious gatherings, making them somewhat akin to Western hymns (Azerbaijani ilahi). One major difference from the aşıq/ozan tradition, however, is that—from the very beginning—the poems of the təkyə tradition were written down. This was because they were produced by revered religious figures in the literate environment of the təkyə, as opposed to the milieu of the aşıq/ozan tradition, where the majority could not read or write. The major figures in the tradition of təkyə literature are Turkish people like: Yunus Emre (1238–1321), who is one of the most important figures in all of Turkish literature; Süleyman Çelebi, who wrote a highly popular long poem called Vesîletü'n-Necât (وسيلة النجاة "The Means of Salvation", but more commonly known as the Mevlid), concerning the birth of the Islamic prophet Muhammad; Kaygusuz Abdal, who is widely considered the founder of Alevi/Bektashi literature; and Pir Sultan Abdal, whom many consider to be the pinnacle of that literature.

== 16th-19th century ==
The two primary streams of Azerbaijani written literature are poetry and prose. Of the two, poetry—specifically, Divan poetry—was by far the dominant stream. Moreover, until the 19th century, Safavid prose did not contain any examples of fiction; that is, there were no counterparts to, for instance, the European romance, short story, or novel (though analogous genres did, to some extent, exist in both the Turkish folk tradition and in Divan poetry).

=== Divan poetry ===
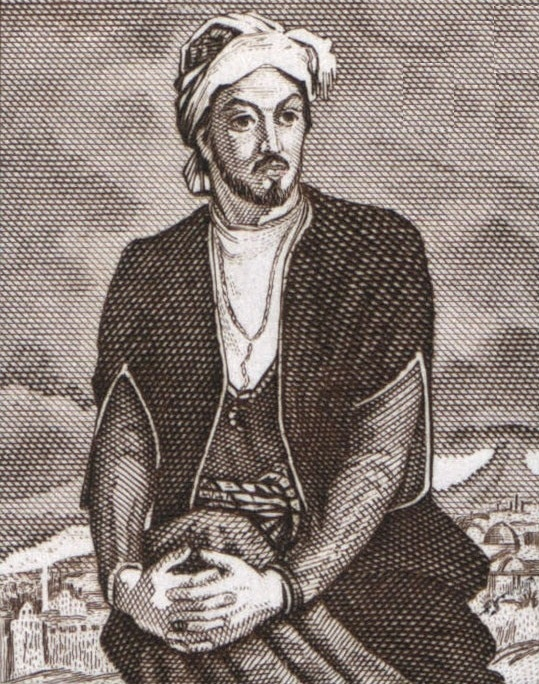
Imadaddin Nasimi, one of the first Azerbaijani-speaking poets to compose a divan

Divan poetry was a ritualized and symbolic art form. From the Persian poetry that largely inspired it, it inherited a wealth of symbols whose meanings and interrelationships—both of similitude (مراعات نظير müraat-i nəzir / تناسب tənasüb) and opposition (تضاد təzad)—were more or less prescribed. Examples of prevalent symbols that, to some extent, oppose one another include, among others:

- the nightingale (بلبل bülbül) — the rose (ﮔل gül)
- the world (جهان cəhan; عالم aləm) — the rosegarden (ﮔﻠﺴﺘﺎن gülüstan; ﮔﻠﺸﻦ gülşən)
- the ascetic (زاهد zahid) — the dervish (درويش dərviş)

As the opposition of "the ascetic" and "the dervish" suggests that divan poetry, much like Azerbaijani folk poetry, was heavily influenced by Shia Islam. One of the primary characteristics of divan poetry. However, as of the Persian poetry before it—was its mingling of the mystical Sufi element with a profane and even erotic element. Thus, the pairing of "the nightingale" and "the rose" simultaneously suggests two different relationships:

- the relationship between the fervent lover ("the nightingale") and the inconstant beloved ("the rose")
- the relationship between the individual Sufi practitioner (who is often characterized in Sufism as a lover) and God (who is considered the ultimate source and object of love)

Similarly, "the world" refers simultaneously to the physical world and to this physical world considered as the abode of sorrow and impermanence, while "the rosegarden" refers simultaneously to a literal garden and to the garden of Paradise. "The nightingale", or suffering lover, is often seen as situated—both literally and figuratively—in "the world", while "the rose", or beloved, is seen as being in "the rose-garden".

As for the development of Divan poetry over the more than 500 years of its existence, that is—as the Ottomanist Walter G. Andrews points out—a study still in its infancy; clearly defined movements and periods have not yet been decided upon.

Azerbaijani poets although they had been inspired and influenced by classical Persian poetry, it would be a superficial judgment to consider the former as blind imitators of the latter, as is often done. A limited vocabulary and common technique, and the same world of imagery and subject matter based mainly on Islamic sources were shared by all poets of Islamic literature.

Despite the lack of certainty regarding the stylistic movements and periods of Divan poetry, however, certain highly different styles are clear enough, and can perhaps be seen as exemplified by certain poets:

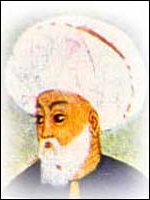
Füzuli (1494–1556), a divan poet of who composed in Azerbaijani

- Füzuli (1494–1556); a unique poet who wrote with equal skill in Azerbaijani, Persian, and Arabic, and who came to be as influential in Persian as in Divan poetry

The vast majority of divan poetry was lyric in nature: either qəzəls (which make up the greatest part of the repertoire of the tradition), or qəsidəs. There were, however, other common genres, most particularly the məsnəvi, a kind of verse romance and thus a variety of narrative poetry; the two most notable examples of this form are the Leyli və Məcnun (ليلى و مجنون) of Füzuli and the Hüsn ü eşq (حسن و عشق; "Beauty and Love") of Şeyx Qalib.

=== Early prose ===
Until the 19th century, prose never managed to develop to the extent that contemporary Divan poetry did. A large part of the reason for this was that much prose was expected to adhere to the rules of səc' (سجع, also transliterated as səci), or rhymed prose. a type of writing descended from the Arabic saj' and which prescribed that between each adjective and noun in a sentence, there must be a rhyme.

Nevertheless, there was a tradition of prose in the literature of the time. This tradition was exclusively nonfictional in nature—the fiction tradition was limited to narrative poetry. A number of such nonfictional prose genres developed:

- the târih (تاريخ), or history, a tradition in which there are many notable writers, including the 15th-century historian Aşıkpaşazâde and the 17th-century historians Kâtib Çelebi and Naîmâ
- the seyâhatnâme (سياحت نامه), or travelogue, of which the outstanding example is the 17th-century Seyahâtnâme of Evliya Çelebi
- the sefâretnâme (سفارت نامه), a related genre specific to the journeys and experiences of an Ottoman ambassador, and which is best exemplified by the 1718–1720 Paris Sefâretnâmesi of Yirmisekiz Mehmed Çelebi, ambassador to the court of King Louis XV of France
- the siyâsetnâme (سياست نامه), a kind of political treatise describing the functionings of state and offering advice for rulers, an early Seljuk example of which is the 11th-century Siyāsatnāma, written in Persian by Nizam al-Mulk, vizier to the Seljuk rulers Alp Arslan and Malik Shah I
- the tezkîre (تذکره), a collection of short biographies of notable figures, some of the most notable of which were the 16th-century tezkiretü'ş-şuarâs (تذكرة الشعرا), or biographies of poets, by Latîfî and Aşık Çelebi
- the münşeât (منشآت), a collection of writings and letters similar to the Western tradition of belles-lettres
- the münâzara (مناظره), a collection of debates of either a religious or a philosophical nature

== Classical era ==
The earliest known figure in Azerbaijani literature is Izzeddin Hasanoghlu, who composed a diwan of Azerbaijani and Persian ghazals. In Persian ghazals he used the pen-name Pur-e Hasan, while his Turkic ghazals were composed under his own name of Hasanoghlu.

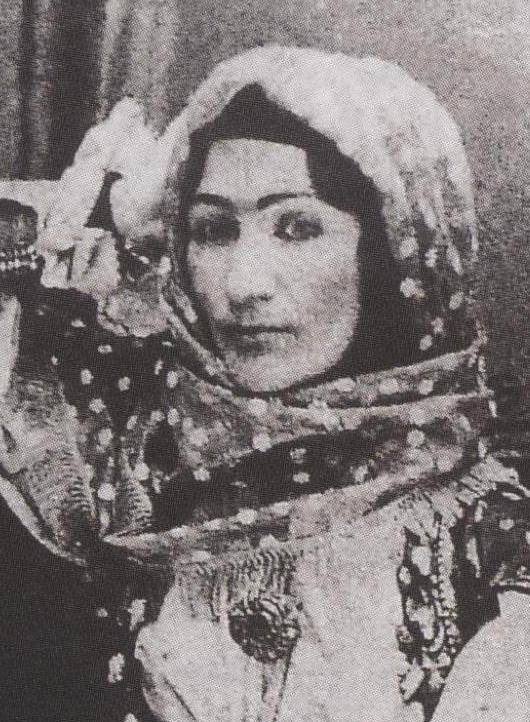
Khurshidbanu Natavan was the daughter of Mehdi Gulu-khan, the last ruler of the Karabakh khanate (1748–1822); she is considered one of the best lyrical poets of Azerbaijan.

In the 15th century, Azerbaijan was under the control of Qara Qoyunlu and Aq Qoyunlu Turkic tribal confederacies. Among the poets of this period were Kadi Burhan al-Din, Haqiqi (pen-name of Jahan-shah Qara Qoyunlu), Habibi, and Kishvari. The end of the 14th century was also the period of starting literary activity of Imadaddin Nasimi, one of the greatest Azerbaijani-speaking Hurufi mystical poets of the late 14th and early 15th centuries The book Dede Qorqud which consists of two manuscripts copied in the 16th century, was not written earlier than the 15th century. It is a collection of twelve stories reflecting the oral tradition of Oghuz nomads. Since the author is buttering up both the Aq Qoyunlu and Ottoman rulers, it has been suggested that the composition belongs to someone living between the Aq Qoyunlu and Ottoman Empire. Geoffery Lewis believes an older substratum of these oral traditions dates to conflicts between the ancient Oghuz and their Turkish rivals in Central Asia (the Pechenegs and the Kipchaks), however this substratum has been clothed in references to the 14th-century campaigns of the Aq Qoyunlu Confederation of Turkic tribes against the Georgians, the Abkhaz, and the Greeks in Trabzon.

The 16th-century poet, Muhammed Fuzuli produced his timeless philosophical and lyrical Qazals in Arabic, Persian, and Azerbaijani. Benefiting immensely from the fine literary traditions of his environment, and building upon the legacy of his predecessors, Fizuli was to become the leading literary figure of his society. His major works include The Divan of Ghazals and The Qasidas.

In the 16th century, Azerbaijani literature further flourished with the development of Ashik (Azerbaijani: Aşıq) poetic genre of bards. During the same period, under the pen-name of Khatāī (Arabic: خطائی for sinner) Shah Ismail I wrote not only in Persian, but also about 1400 verses in Turkic, aimed at his Turkic-speaking qizilbash army, which were later published as his Divan.

In the span of the 17th century and 18th century, Fuzuli's unique genres as well Ashik poetry were taken up by prominent poets and writers such as Qovsi of Tabriz, Molla Vali Vidadi, Molla Panah Vagif, and others.

Along with Anatolian Turks, Turkmens and Uzbeks, Azerbaijanis also celebrate the epic of Koroglu (Azerbaijani: kor oğlu for blind man's son), a legendary hero or a noble bandit of the Robin Hood type. Several documented versions of Koroglu epic remain at the Institute for Manuscripts of the National Academy of Sciences of Azerbaijan.

== The nineteenth century onward ==
Azerbaijani literature of the nineteenth century was profoundly influenced by the Russian conquest of the territory of present-day Republic of Azerbaijan, as a result of Russo-Persian Wars, which separated the territory of nowadays Azerbaijan, from Iran. Azerbaijani-Turkish writer Ali bey Huseynzade's poem Turan inspired Turanism and pan-Turkism among Turkish intellectuals during the First World War and early Republican period. Hüseynzade emphasized the linguistic bonds between the Turks, who were Muslim, and the Christian people of Hungary.

The fascination with language is seen in the work of Mirzə Cəlil Məmmədquluzadə who was an influential figure in the development of Azerbaijani nationalism in Soviet Azerbaijan. Məmmədqulzadə, who was also the founder of the satirical journal Molla Nasraddin, wrote the play Anamın kitabı (My Mother's Book) in 1920 in Karabakh. It was about a wealthy widow who lived with her three sons who had graduated from universities in St. Petersburg, Istanbul and Najaf. The brothers had adapted to the culture and languages of the cities in which they were educated and were not able to understand one another or their mother. Their sister, Gülbahar, only able to read in Muslim language (müsəlmanca savadlı), burns her brothers' books at the end. After the Russian vocabularies, Ottoman poems, and Persian astronomy books are destroyed, the only book that survives Gülbahar's "cultural revolution" is a notebook, written in Azerbaijani language, containing wishes for the unity of the family.

=== Soviet Azerbaijani literature ===
Under the Soviet rule, particularly during Joseph Stalin's reign, Azerbaijani writers who did not conform to the party line were persecuted. Bolsheviks sought to destroy the nationalist intellectual elite established during the short-lived Azerbaijan Democratic Republic, and in the 1930s, many writers and intellectuals were essentially turned into mouthpieces of Soviet propaganda.

Although there were those who did not follow to the official party line in their writings. Among them were Mahammad Hadi, Abbas Sahhat, Huseyn Javid, Abdulla Shaig, Jafar Jabbarly, and Mikayil Mushfig, who in their search for a means of resistance, turned to the clandestine methodologies of Sufism, which taught spiritual discipline as a way to combat temptation.

When Nikita Khrushchev came to power in 1953 following Stalin's death, the harsh focus on propaganda began to fade, and writers began to branch off in new directions, primarily focused on uplifting prose that would be a source of hope to Azerbaijanis living under a totalitarian regime.

=== Iranian Azerbaijani literature ===
An influential piece of post-World War II Azerbaijani poetry, Heydar Babaya Salam (Greetings to Heydar Baba) is considered to be a pinnacle in Azerbaijani literature was written by Iranian Azerbaijani poet Mohammad Hossein Shahriar. This poem, published in Tabriz in 1954 and written in colloquial Azerbaijani, became popular among Azerbaijanis in Iran's northwestern historic region of Azerbaijan and Republic of Azerbaijan. In Heydar Babaya Salam, Shahriar expressed his Azerbaijani identity attached to his homeland, language, and culture. Heydar Baba is a hill near Khoshknab, the native village of the poet.

== Modern literature ==
From writers of modern Azerbaijan, the most famous were the screenwriter Rustam Ibragimbekov and the author of the detective novels Chingiz Abdullayev, who wrote exclusively in Russian.

Poetry is represented by famous poets Nariman Hasanzade, Khalil Rza, Sabir Novruz, Vagif Samadoghlu, Nusrat Kesemenli, Ramiz Rovshan, Hamlet Isakhanli, Zalimkhan Yagub, etc. Among modern Azerbaijani playwrights, F. Goja, Elchin, K. Abdullah, A. Masud, G. Miralamov, E. Huseynbeyli, A. Ragimov, R. Akber, A. Amirley, and others.

The framework of the new Azerbaijani prose is expanded by elements of the detective, fiction, anti-utopia, Turkic mythology, eastern surrealism. Among the writers working in this genre one can name such writers as Anar, M. Suleymanly, N. Rasulzade, R. Rahmanoglu. The new Azerbaijani realism began to gain momentum when young prose writers began to turn increasingly to national history and ethnic memory. In this regard, it is worth noting the historical and synthetic novel "The Thirteenth Apostle, or One Hundred Forty-First Don Juan" by Elchin Huseynbeyli and the historical novels "Shah Abbas" and "Nadir Shah" by Yunus Oguz.

After gaining independence in Azerbaijan, an important role was played by the liberation of the occupied territories, love of the Motherland and justice. One of the most famous books about Karabakh are: "Karabakh – mountains call us" Elbrus Orujev, "Azerbaijan Diary: A Rogue Reporter's Adventures in an Oil-Rich, War-Torn, Post-Soviet Republic" Thomas Goltz "History of Azerbaijan on documents and Ziya Bunyatov. The Karabakh war left its misprint in the modern Azerbaijani literature: such writers as G. Anargizy, M. Suleymanly, A. Rahimov, S. Ahmedli, V. Babally, K. Nezirli, A. Kuliev, A. Abbas, M. Bekirli turned to the themes of the fate of refugees, longing for the lost Shusha, Khojaly massacre, cruelty of war, etc.

To support young writers in 2009, the "Ali and Nino" publishing house established the National Book Award of Azerbaijan, which annually monitors novelties of literature, and gives awards to the most successful samples of literature and works released over the past year. The jury of the award includes well-known Azerbaijani writers, cultural figures.

== Government influence ==
=== Cultural laws of the Republic of Azerbaijan ===
Creative persons, winners of festival and competition who have special services in the development and promotion of culture, are awarded with honorary titles and awards in the form determined by the relevant executive authority.

Persons who have exceptional services in the development of Azerbaijani culture are awarded with orders and medals in accordance with Article 109.2 of the Constitution of Azerbaijan.

=== State support in the field of literature ===
The literary editions of the Union of Writers – " Newspaper of Literature", "Azerbaijan", "Ulduz", "Gobustan" and "Literaturniy Azerbaijan " in Russian began to operate after the X congress of the Union of Writers of Azerbaijan, which was held in October 1997 with the participation of Heydar Aliyev. Also, Mingachevir, Aran, and Moscow departments of the Writers Union of Azerbaijan were created after that congress.

For the first time in 1995, the "Istiglal" order was given to Bakhtiyar Vahabzade by Heydar Aliyev. Mammad Araz and Khalil Rza Uluturk were also awarded the "Istiglal" Order.

The literary activity of National writer Anar Rzayev has been awarded the “Heydar Aliyev Prize” by Ilham Aliyev.

The book "Heydar Aliyev and Azerbaijan Literature", prepared by the ANAS Institute of Literature in 2010, was awarded the State Prize in 2014. The publicist novel of "Heydar Aliyev: Personality and Time" with 6 volumes written by Elmira Akhundova and in 2016 Fikrat Goca's Works – 10 volumes were awarded that State Prize.

Sabir Rustamkhanli, Nariman Hasanzade and Zelimkhan Yaqub were awarded “National poets” by Ilham Aliyev in 2005. Maqsud and Rustam Ibrahimbeyov's brothers, Movlud Suleymanli were awarded the title of "National Writer" by the President. In general, there are 22 “National poets” and 25 “National writers” in the country. Chingiz Abdullayev was awarded both the honorary title "Glory" and the "National Writer" by the decree of the President in 2009 when he was 50 years old.

Ilham Aliyev signed a decree on holding 100th anniversary of S. Vurgun, S.Rustam, M. Jalal, M.Huseyn, A.Alekbarzade, M.Ibrahimov, R. Rza, Ilyas Afandiyev. He also signed a decree on holding 100th anniversary of Almas Yildirim on April 16, 2007, and Mikayil Mushfiq in 2008 who are the victims of repression. Ilham Aliyev signed decrees to hold the 125th, 130th and 135th anniversary of Hussein Javid.

S.Rahimov and M.Adadzadeh were celebrated the 110th anniversary, M. Rasulzadeh – the 130th anniversary, A.Huseynzade – 150th anniversary. The celebration of these writers' anniversaries at the state level also serves to promote them throughout the world.

On November 10, 2008 Mehriban Aliyeva, President of the Heydar Aliyev Foundation, spoke at the UNESCO headquarters in Paris on the occasion of the 100th anniversary of M.Pashayev.

Hundreds of books have been published based on the decree of the President, dated 12 January 2004, on “The implementation of mass editions in the Azerbaijani language (Latin)". In addition, 150 volumes of examples from the World Literature Library have been translated.

=== Literature museums ===
President Ilham Aliyev attended the opening of the Literature Museum in Gazakh. The busts of 12 national heroes and famous writers from Qazakh were erected in the park where the museum is located. The president signed an order on June 1, 2012, to allocate from the Presidential Reserve Fund AZN 5 million to construct this museum.

== See also ==
- Azerbaijani people
- Azerbaijani language
- Mehri and Vafa
- Azerbaijani-language poets
- Nizami Museum of Azerbaijan Literature
