= Calligraphy in Azerbaijani culture =

Calligraphy in Azerbaijani culture (North Azerbaijani: Azərbaycan mədəniyyətində xəttatlıq; South Azerbaijani: آذربایجان مدنیتنده خطاطلق) is the role played by calligraphy in Azerbaijani literature and visual arts. In the Middle Ages, various examples of calligraphy were used in the writing of Azerbaijani manuscripts (naskh, nastaliq, taliq, shikaste, suls, reyhani, divani, ruga, muhaqqiq, tougi), and scientific works were written in the naskh script. In the 19th century, the works "Inshai-Mirza Kazim", "Majmaul-khosh Khatih" by Abdulqani Khalisagarizade Nukhavi and "Khatti-taliq va nastalig" by Abdussalam Akhundzadeh were written. Although calligraphy declined in Azerbaijan during the Soviet era, it is still used in modern times.

== History ==
=== Middle Ages ===
In the writing of Azerbaijani handwritten books, there are many methods of copying, nastaliq, taliq, shikaste, suls, reyhani, divani, ruga, muhaggiq, tougi, etc. line samples were used. Scientific works are mostly written in naskh line. In addition, examples of calligraphy can be found in mosque inscriptions, examples of coppersmithing, war items, kashkul and tabarzi used by Sufi dervishes. An example of an Azerbaijani-speaking calligrapher who lived in the Middle Ages is Kishvari. Medieval Azerbaijani manuscripts were copied by scribes and calligrapher: Khalil bin Ahmed, Mahmud Nishapuri during the Safavid period, Muhammad ibn Huseyn Katib Nishati, Mahmud Shirazi, Osman ibn Mahmud Effendi of Shamakhi in the 18th century, Kazim Garadonlu. The Oxford copy of Afsaheddin Hidayat divan from the 15th century stands out for its graphic-calligraphic uniqueness. In 1591, Mahmud ibn Shahmohammed Ardabili copied Muhammad Fuzuli's divan in the taliq line. Currently, this book is stored in the Turkish manuscripts department of the Topkapı Palace Museum in Istanbul. In 1664, Muhammad Reza Ardabili copied Fuzuli's poem "Leyli and Majnun" in the line of nastaliq. This copy, which is decorated with 22 miniatures and has a high artistic value apart from its literary significance, is preserved in the Turkish-language manuscripts department of the British Library. In his poem, Muhammad Fuzuli used the incantation "to make the hand a pen" for calligraphers who write badly, make punctuation and spelling mistakes. This shows that the mistakes of calligraphers in writing lead to differences in meaning.

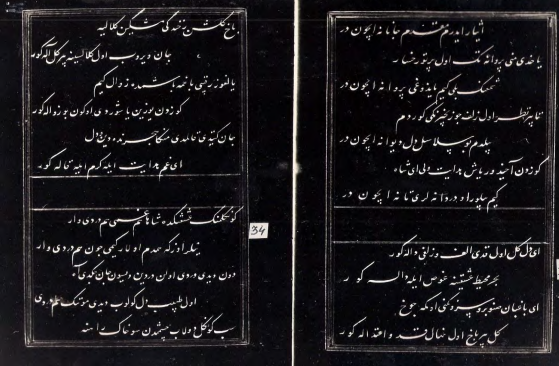
Afsahaddin Hidayat's divan

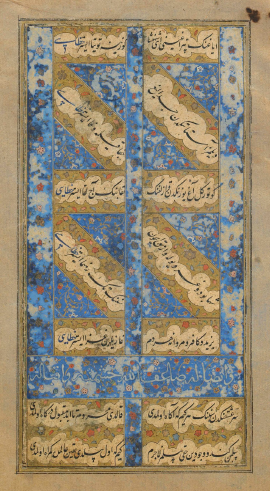
Ismayil's divan

=== 19th-early 20th century ===
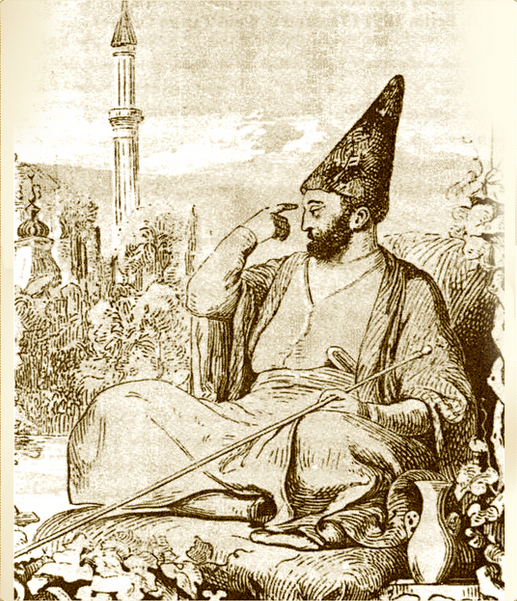
Mirza Shafi Vazeh reads his poems to Friedrich Bodenstedt. Illustration from Bodenstedt's 1850 book 1001 Days in the East

In Azerbaijan, master Baba (18th century, Baku), master Abuzar Badalov (18th-19th centuries, Shahbuz), master Zeynal Naqgash (19th century, Ordubad), master Ahmed (19th century, Lankaran), master Muhammad (19th century), Ganja) artists were engaged with calligraphy. In the 19th and early 20th centuries, rich houses in Azerbaijan used qatas (a work of art consisting of Quranic verses written in golden script and framed) hung on carpets.

In the northwestern region of Azerbaijan, the best examples of calligraphy can be seen on tombstones and manuscripts. In the 18th-19th centuries the art of calligraphy reached its peak in the region. The most common type of writing is naskh, and the regional type is called "Naskh-i Tala". Ashiq Huseyn Mashlashi dedicated each stanza of his poem "You look like Alif" to an Arabic letter. Another tradition belonging to the Jar-Balakan region is the Kahf juzü tradition. Surah Kahf of the Holy Qur'an is written in the form of juz and is read on Fridays. Juzs were written by famous calligraphers of the time, as well as by people who could read and write (madrasa students, common people, even women). More than a hundred examples of this tradition are preserved in the Zagatala Museum of History and Geography.

Calligraphers such as Mirza Muhammadkarim bey Kabirli, Haji Mirza Aligulu Yusifzadeh, Molla Ali Karabagi, Mirza Ismayil Mehshun, Mirza Huseyn bey Salar, Mir Mohsun Navvab, Hasanali Khan Garadaghi worked in Shusha, one of the cultural centers of 19th century Azerbaijan. Molla Ali's student Mirza Kazim published his writings under the name "Inshai-Mirza Kazim" and this book was used as an example of calligraphy in madrasahs. Hasanali Khan Garadaghi copied Mir Mehdi Khazani's book "Kitabi-tarikhi-Karabagh" in shikaste-nastaliq script. Mirza Kadym Irevani wrote fragments of poetry from the Persian poet Saadi in the erasing line in a folder-shaped gift kept in the Hermitage Museum. Mirza Ismayil Gasir, secretary of Lankaran region court, was a master of naskh, taliq and nakhun lines.

German orientalist Friedrich Bodenstedt described Mirza Shafi Vazeh, who taught calligraphy in Ganja and Tiflis: "Mirza Shafi wrote very beautifully and at the same time brought beauty and variety: he adapted the letters to the content of the text. If he had to write about ordinary things, then he dressed them in festive clothes for ordinary, fancy things, wrote letters to women in a special thin script".

In the middle of the 19th century, special attention was paid to calligraphy lessons in madrasas in Azerbaijan. One such madrasah was the madrasah of Abdulqani Khalisagarizadeh Nukhavi (1817–1879), the author of "Majmaul-Khosh Khati" in Nukha. Nukhavi's handwritten books were composed with artistic aesthetic taste, mostly using naskh and nastaliq lines. Abdussalam Akhundzadeh, the 5th Shaykh al-Islām of the Caucasian Muslims, published the textbook "Khatti-taliq and Nastaliq" in Tbilisi in 1894. In the surrounding villages of Baku city, the art of calligraphy was mostly taught in schools near mosques along with religious lessons, and this is how skilled masters of this art were trained. Mirza Asadullah from Surakhani was the calligrapher of the hadiths of the "Ismailiyya" building facade. Handicrafts of his student Ahmed Alizade are stored in the Institute of Manuscripts of ANAS.

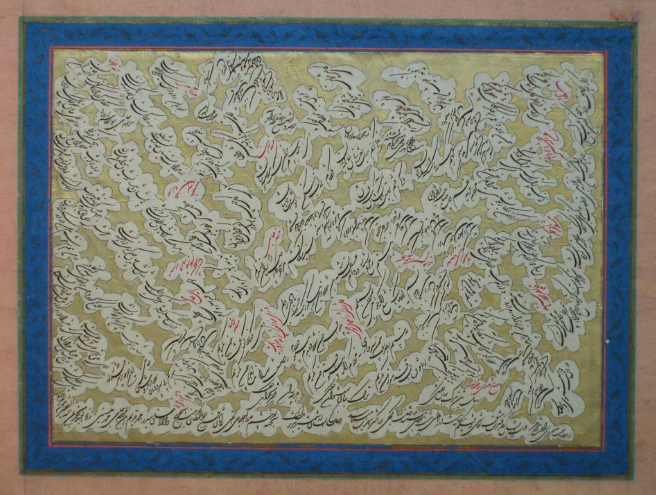
An example of artistic manuscript of Mirza Kadym Irevani

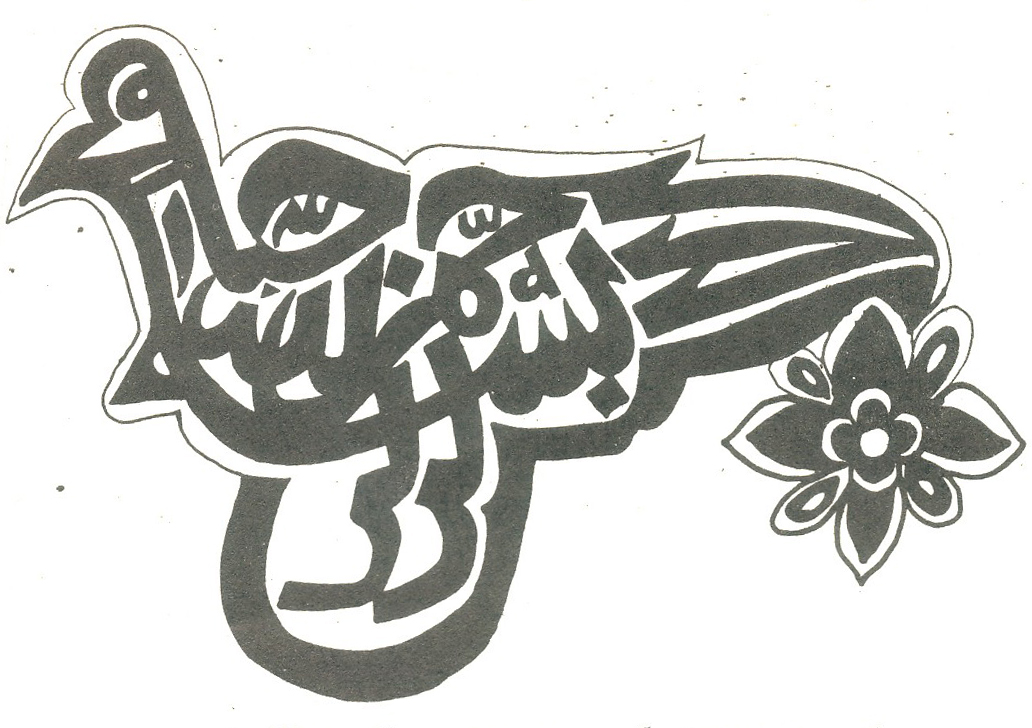
The inscription of the tomb of Sheikh Badreddin

=== Modern Age ===
During the Soviet era, the transition to Latin script and scientific and technical progress led to the decline of the art of calligraphy. In modern times, artists such as Seyfeddin Mansimoglu, Haji Eldar Mikayilzade, Yavar Asadov, Gulkhan Baydemir use calligraphy in their works. Combining calligraphy with woodcarving, Seyfeddin Mansimoglu dedicated works to personalities such as Muhammad Fuzuli, Shah Ismayil Khatai, and Maulana Jalaladdin Rumi. Haji Eldar Mikayilzade created a synthesis of artistic calligraphy with botanical and Islamic patterns in the restoration of the Taza Pir Mosque.

== Calligraphers ==
=== Middle Ages ===
- Kishvari
- Nasimi
- Fuzuli
- Habibi

=== 19th-early 20th century ===
- Muhammad Khalifa Ajiz. The poet who lived during the Qajar era was a master calligrapher, he wrote poems and odes for prayers and the court. He used to write prayers in the naskh line, which he was good at.
- Abdulqani Nukhavi. The calligrapher who wrote "Mukhtasar al-Quduri". His copy is distinguished by its polygraphic features and quality.
- Molla Gasim Bayat. He copied the face of the manuscripts. So, he invited calligraphers, painters, muzahibs and bookbinders from Shusha to his village in order to reproduce copies of manuscripts. During his leadership, the art of calligraphy was mainly taught as a subject in the Bayat Madrasah.
- Abdulkarim Bey Mammadov. He copied book pages for Jafargulu Khan's library.

=== Modern Age ===
- Azad Yashar. The original Kufic calligraphy composition "Allahu-akbar" was included in the "Calligraphy" section of the "Azerbaijani art" encyclopedia for children (2011).

== See also ==
- Azerbaijani carpet

== Sources ==
- Azərbaycan etnoqrafiyası, Üç cilddə II cild., Azərbaycan Milli Elmlər Akademiyası Arxeologiya və Etnoqrafiya İnstitutu, Bakı: Şərq-Qərb, 2007, ISBN 978-5-17-033764-4
