= Literature of Azerbaijan (disambiguation) =

Literature of Azerbaijan primarily refers to Azerbaijani literature, or Azeri language literature. It could also refer to:

- Persian literature from Azerbaijan
- Arabic literature from Azerbaijan
- Russian literature from Azerbaijan
