= Vasim Mammadaliyev =

Azerbaijani orientalist (1942–2019)

- Born: August 27, 1942; Kurdakhany, Baku, Azerbaijan SSR, Soviet Union
- Died: October 13, 2019; Baku, Azerbaijan
- Awards: Sheref Order
- Scientific career
- Fields: Oriental studies
- Workplaces: National Academy of Sciences of the Azerbaijan SSR

Vasim Mammadali oghlu Mammadaliyev (Azerbaijani: Vasim Məmmədəli oğlu Məmmədəliyev; August 27, 1942 – October 13, 2019) was an Azerbaijani scientist of oriental studies, dean of theology faculty at Baku State University, chairman of a cathedra of Arabic philology and full member of Azerbaijan National Academy of Sciences.

== Life ==
Vasim Mammadaliyev was born on August 27, 1942, in Baku, into a family of intellectuals.

He got his primary education in Baku and then entered oriental studies faculty of Azerbaijan State University, with a specialty in Arabic philology.

In 1964–1967, he was post-graduate student of Azerbaijan State University. In 1968, at the age of 26, he defended Doctor's dissertation on the theme of “Comparative and typological analysis of tenses of the verb in modern Arabic-Azerbaijani languages and Iraqi dialect” at Tbilisi State University, and he became the youngest Doctor of Arabic sciences in the USSR after defending Doctor's dissertation on the theme of “Tense, person and mood in modern Arabic language”, in 1974, at the age of 32.

== Scientific activity ==
In 1978, he became the Professor of ANAS. Vasim Mammadaliyev was a member of the ⁣⁣Iraqi Academy of Sciences (1989), Academy of Islamic Right under the Organisation of Islamic Cooperation (1994), Syrian Academy of Quran Sciences and Arabic philology (1995) and Academy of Arabic Language of Egypt (2003).

In 1992, he acquired a title of Honored Science Worker of Azerbaijan. In 2002, the Sheref Order was conferred on him. In 2003, he acquired a title of Honored Science Worker of Dagestan. In 2007, he was chosen academician of Azerbaijan National Academy of Sciences.

Mammadaliyev was the author of more than 600 articles and 20 books. His works were published in more than 15 countries. He had scientific collaboration with such countries as Turkey, Iran, Iraq, Egypt, Libya, Georgia, Russia, Saudi Arabia, Syria, the UAE, Kuwait and others. He translated the Quran into the Azerbaijani language together with academician Ziya Bunyadov during the Soviet period. The translation, which was initially published in 1991, later was republished 10 times.

Vasim Mammadaliyev was chairman of the Azerbaijani-Iraqi friendship Union and the Scientific-Religious Council of the Caucasus Muslims Clerical Office since 1997.
