= Kürdəxanı =

Kurdakhany
- Municipality
- Azerbaijani: Kürdəxanı
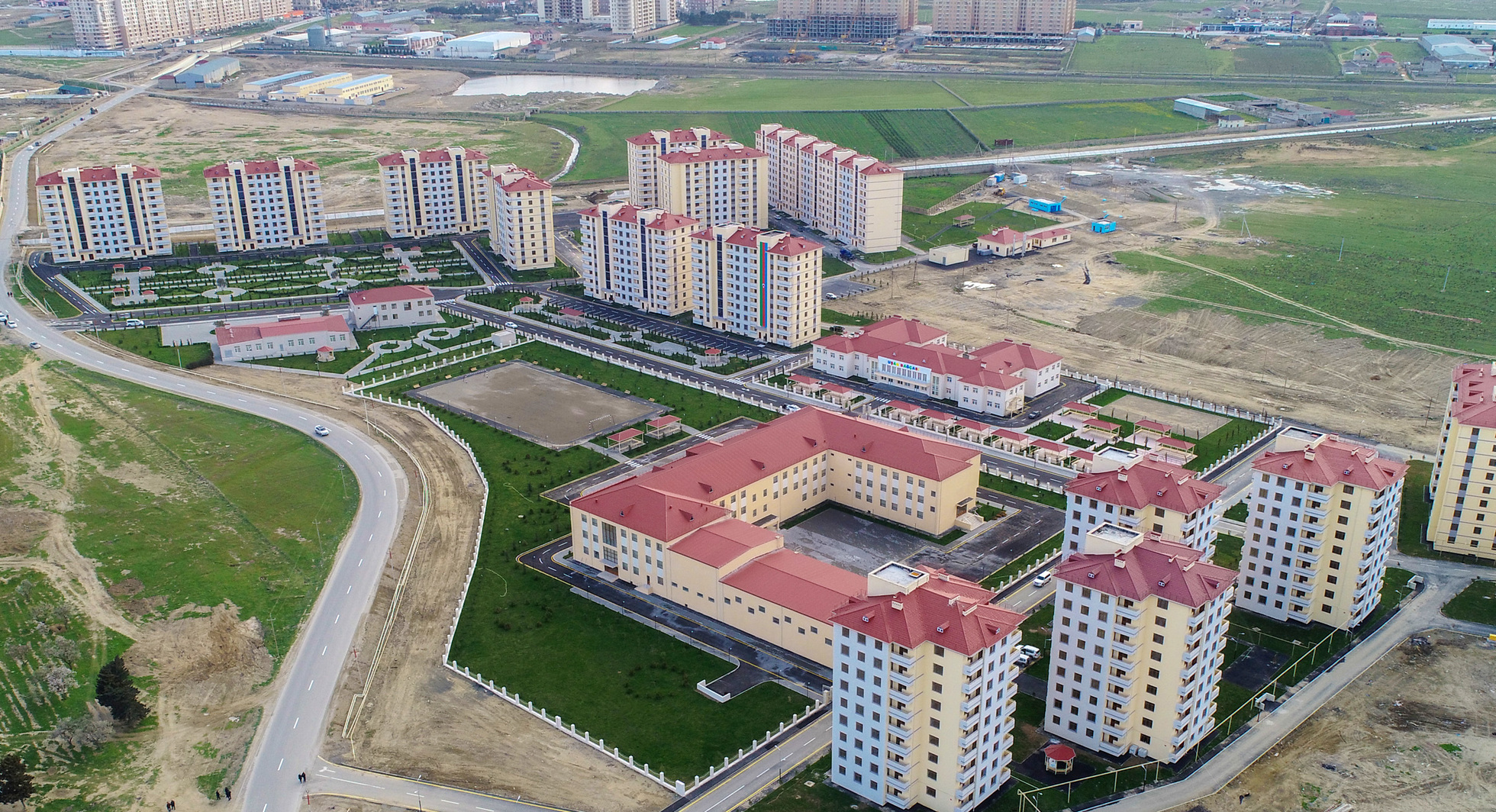
- New residential complex for IDP families in Kurdaxani settlement

- Location within Azerbaijan
- Coordinates: 40°32′54″N 49°55′19″E
- Country: Azerbaijan
- City: Baku
- Raion: Sabunchu

Area
  - Total: 27.3 km^{2} (10.5 sq mi)

Population (2017)
  - Total: 6,600
- Time zone: UTC+4 (AZT)
  - Summer (DST): UTC+5 (AZT)

Kürdəxanı (also, Kurdakhany) is a settlement and municipality in Sabunchu district of Baku, Azerbaijan.

== History ==
Earliest settlements in Kurdakhany are believed to be dated at least two millennia ago, which is supported by archeological artifacts. Historical monuments:

- Sheykh Ali Shirvani khanqah and mosque - built in 1448
- Haji Zeynal hamam - built in 17th century
- Haji Jafargulu hamam - built in 16th century
- Juma mosque - 14th century (rebuilt in 2007)

Kurdakhany was one of settlements which were not affected by March Day events. Due to armed resistance with local qochu. In the 1886 official census 1270 ethnic tats were living here. According to Sara Ashurbeyli, the name of Kurdakhany referenced the ethnic Kurds.

== Quarters ==
Kurdakhany is located on northern side of Absheron peninsula, highest altitude above sea level, rich with salt lakes and mud volcanos. Municipality is divided into three quarters: Old quarter, New quarter and gardens.

=== Old quarter ===
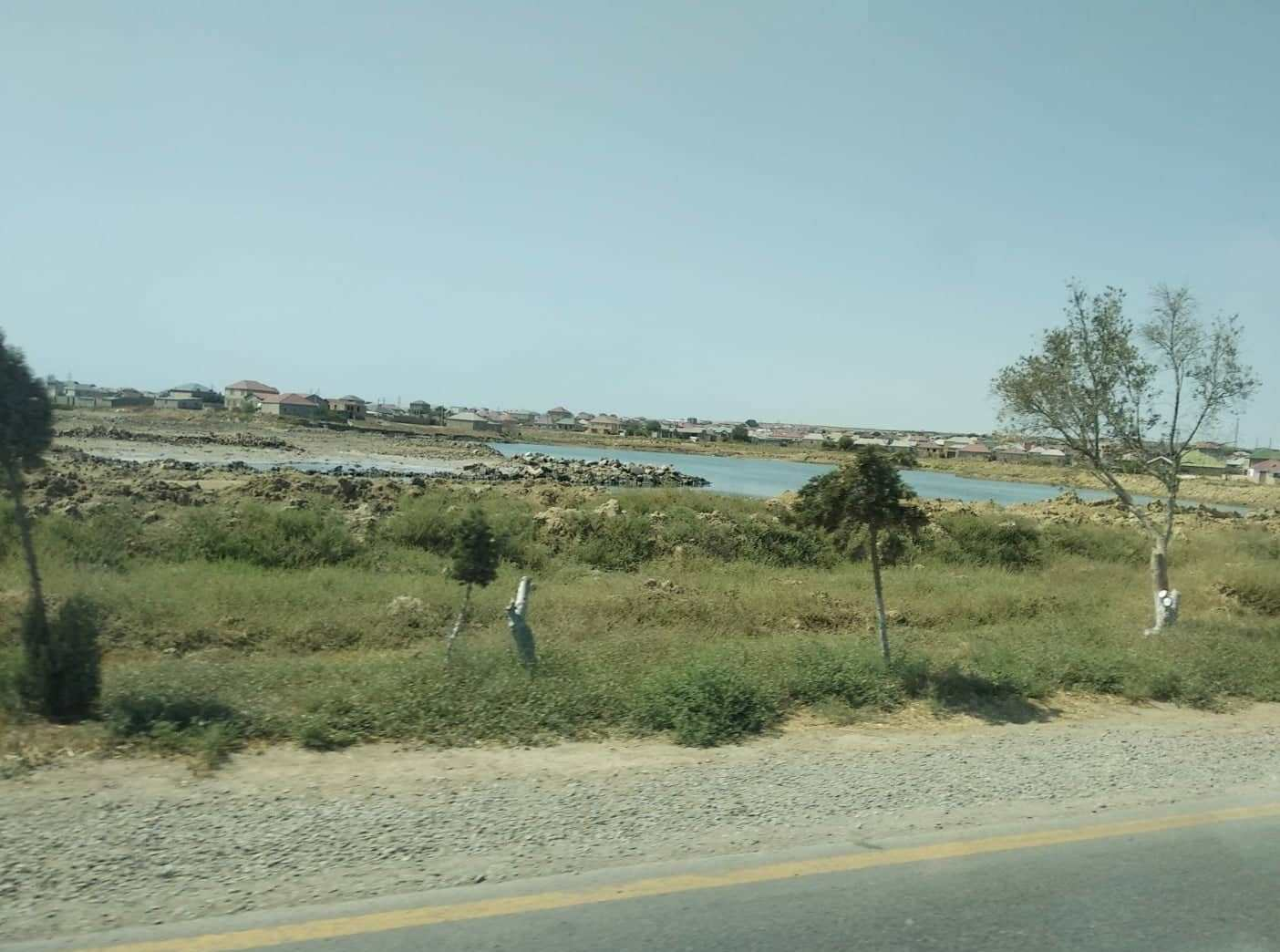
Kurdakhani Village

Old quarter is oldest part of Kurdakhany. A local school, kindergarten, Juma mosque is located on this quarter.

=== New quarter ===
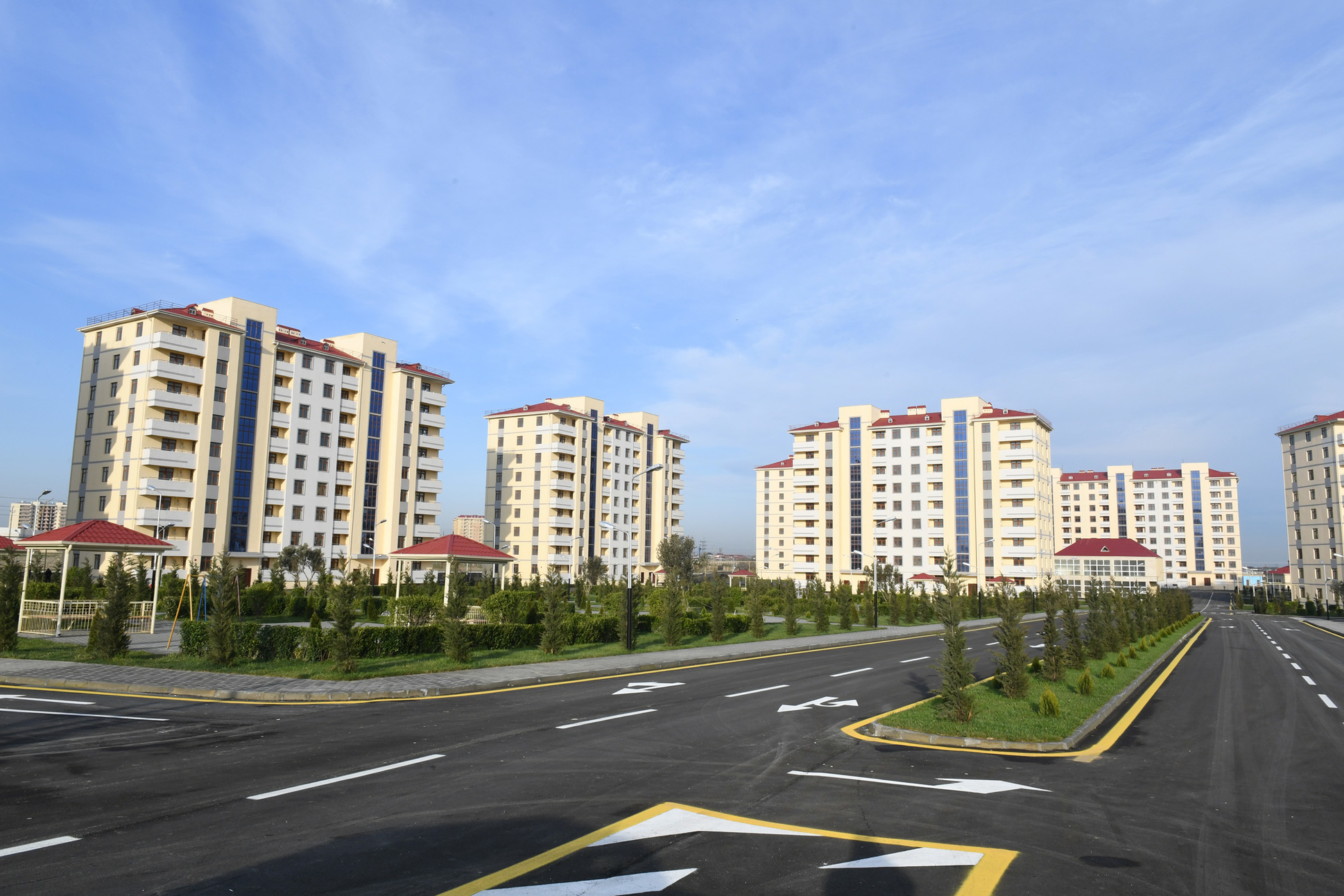
New residential complex for IDP families in Kurdaxani settlement.

New quarter is located on western side of municipality and mostly consists of post-Soviet houses on former sovkhoz lands. Inhabitants are mostly refugees from Karabakh as well as non-local population which came from nearby municipalities.

=== Gardens ===
Locals have additional lands seaside, which are called "Ləhiş bağları" (Lahij gardens). A mosque exists in gardens quarter which was built by local inhabitants in the 19th century, besides a khanqah of an Ahi Brotherhood which was built in 1448.

== Famous people ==
- Vasim Mammadaliyev - Azerbaijani scientist of oriental studies
- Huseynbala Aghaverdiyev (1890–1937) - Minister of the State Property and Cultivation of Azerbaijan SSR, also a street named after him.
- Abbasgulu Kazimzadeh - Founding member of Musavat party, member of Azerbaijan Democratic Republic parliament
- Baba Punhan - Famous Azerbaijani poet

=== Martyrs ===
Several martyrs of the first Karabakh war were born in Kurdakhany - Ilgar Guliyev (has a street named after him), Pasha Nazirov, Faiz Heydarov, Ilgar Zulfugarov (a street named after him), Natig Babayev, Fikrat Babayev, Mubariz Mammadov.

== Miscellaneous ==
Kurdakhany has a relatively modern "Yamin Castle" (Azerbaijani: Yamin qalası), named after his builder Yamin who built this "castle" by his own hands during his madness.
