= Mahammad Hadi =

Azerbaijani poet (1879–1920)

Mahammad Hadi Məhəmməd Hadi
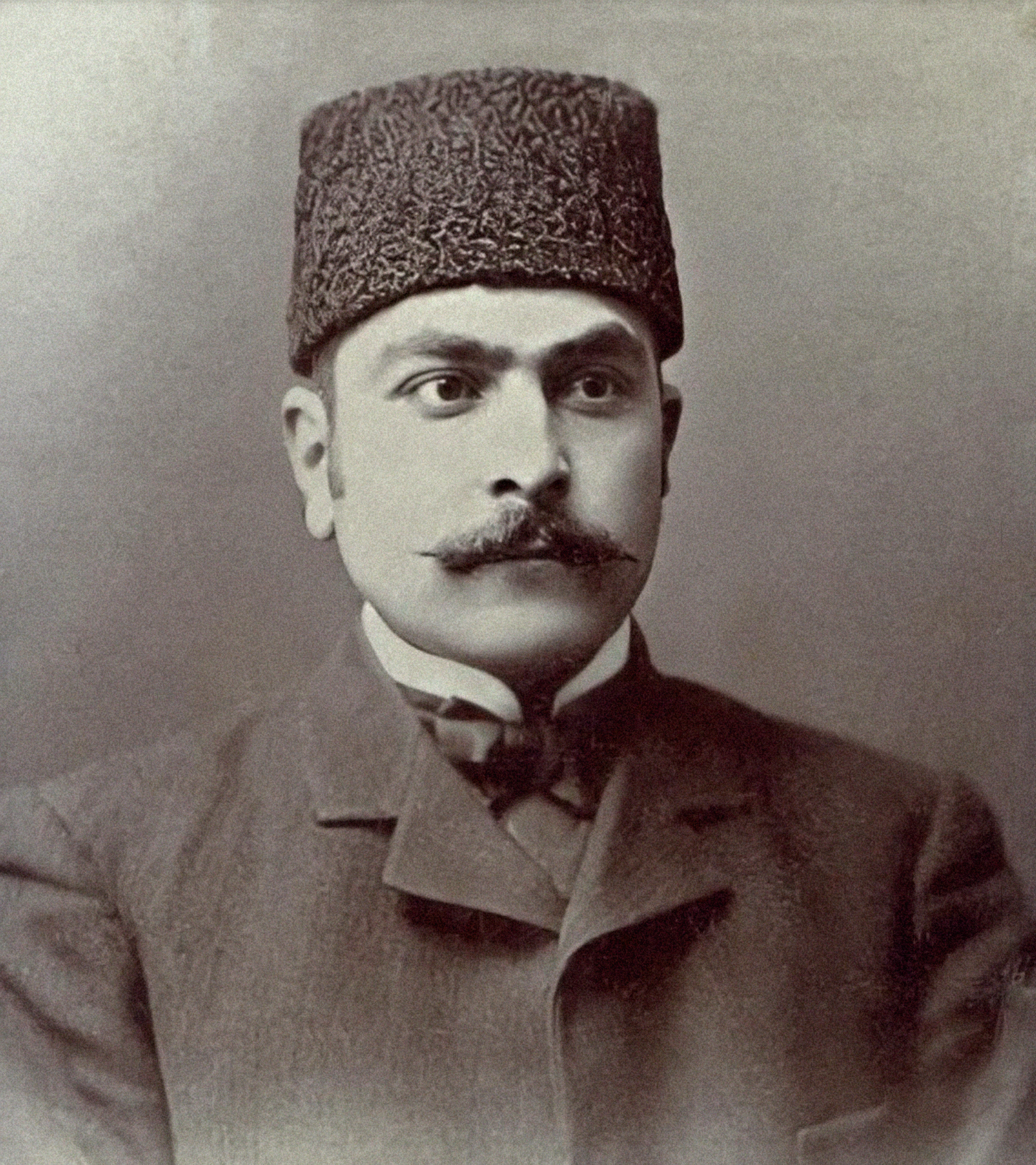
- Born: 1879; Shamakhi, Azerbaijan
- Died: 1920; Ganja, Azerbaijan
- Occupation: Poet

Mahammad Hadi or Agha-Mahammad Haji-Abdulsalim oglu Abdulsalimzade (Azerbaijani: Məhəmməd Əbdülsəlimzadə Hadi Şirvani; 1879, Shamakhi - 1920, Ganja) was an Azerbaijani romanticist poet.

== Biography ==
Founder of progressive romanticism in Azerbaijani literature, Mahammad Hadi was born in 1879, in Shamakhi, into a family of a merchant. He received his primary education in a mosque, at mullah. Later he studied at Abbas Sahhat’s father mullah Aliabbas’s school. Losing his father at early ages, Hadi continued his education himself, learning Arabian and Persian languages excellently.

An earthquake in 1902, demolished Hadi’s house in Shamakhi. Looking for a shelter and work, Hadi went to Kürdəmir, where he taught for some period of time. In 1906, at insistence of his teacher and relative Mustafa Lutfi, he moved to him, to Astrakhan. But he didn’t stay there for a long time and returned to Baku and worked in editorial office of “Fiyuzat” and “Irshad” magazines and “New life” and “Taraggi” newspapers.

In 1910, Hadi went to Turkey, where he worked as a translator of eastern languages, in editorial office of “Tenin” newspaper. Here he acted against Muslim orders, particularly, against oppression of women. He was exiled to Thessaloniki for that. After some period of time he was exiled to Istanbul and then to Baku. The exile shook Hadi's health, but he continued to work at “Igbal” newspaper and to publish his poems.

After beginning of World War I, Mahammad Hadi went to front within “Savage Division” of Muslims and was in Poland and Galicia until the end of the war. After the Russian Revolution in 1917–1918, Hadi returned to Azerbaijan, where he died in May, 1920 in Ganja.

== Activities ==
After the earthquake in Shamakhi in 1902, Mahammad Hadi moved to Kurdamir district. For making a living he tried to open a shop twice but he was bankrupt due to his lack of experience in this field. Shortly after Hadi decided to open a school with Agha Efendi with the financial help of some enlighteners. Due to his intelligence, Mahammad Hadi was selected as the representative of Kurdamir teachers and sent to Tbilisi in order to participate in Transcaucasian Teachers' Congress in 1204.

Between 1902 and 1906, the financial situation of Mahammad Hadi became better and he continued to buy the famous journals of that time, "Sabah" from Istanbul, "Heyat" from Baku, and "Tercuman" from Bakhchysarai in order to be familiar with the outside world.

Mahammad Hadi started his career as a poet in 1905 with writing several poetries in the newspapers and was able to know among local readers. Due to his success, one of his close friends, Mustafa Lutfi (the publisher the "Burhani-Tereggi" newspaper in Astrakhan) called him for working in his newspaper. With considering his friend's request, in 1905, Hadi went to Astrakhan and started to work there. At that time, Mahammad Hadi was also writing educative articles and poetries in Heyat", "Fuyuzat" və "Burhani-Tereggi" journals that aimed to attract the attention of ordinary people to the importance of science. Hadi came to Baku in 1906 at the request of Ali Bey Husseinzade and worked in the "Fuyuzat" journal. After "Fuyuzat" was closed, he worked in "Taza Hayat" and "Ittifak" newspapers.

During the 1907–1908 years, Mahammad Hadi was already considered one of the important figures of Azerbaijan poetry because his writings directly or indirectly contained and emphasized the concept of freedom. Neghmeyi-ehrarane", "Dushizeyi-hurriyete", “Huriyi-herriyete", "Edvari-teceddud", "Esari-inqilab" were considered the main the examples of his poetries written on the concept of freedom.

In 1910, Hadi went to Istanbul, Turkey, and started to work at "Tenin" the newspaper that used to publish by Tofig Fikret and Hussein Javid. Because of his fluency in the Oriental languages, he worked as an interpreter. His several poetries and articles translated from different languages were published in this newspaper. In that time, his poetries was famous not only Turkey but also in the Middle East. In addition, his "Funun and Ma'arif" poetry was translated into Persian and published in India.

In 1911–1912, along with "Tenin", the poems, articles, translations of Mahammad Hadi were published in different journals such as "Rubab", "Shahbal", "Mekhtab" and "Shahrahi-Sebah". Here he devoted several poetries to the revolutionary poet of Turkey, Tofig Fikret.

In 1913, the Ottoman government arrested Hadi due to his opposite views and exiled to Thessaloniki. Nevertheless, Mahammad Hadi was able to return to Baku in 1914. At that year, Hadi started working in the editorial office of the “Iqbal” newspaper. He published more than 20 rubai from Omar Khayyam to Azerbaijani during that year.

Along with the Iqbal newspaper, Hadi published his articles in "Basirat" newspaper starting from April 12, 1914.

In 1915, he was sent Austrian front within “Savage Division” of Muslims and served as Imam of the Muslim soldiers. After returning from the war, Mahammad Hadi resided in Ganja and then came to Baku in 1918.

His poems were collected and published in four books between 1918 and 1919 and. “Alvahi-intibah” was considered the most important among his poems.
