= Baba Punhan =

Azerbaijani poet

- Born: November 5, 1948; Kurdakhany, Baku, Azerbaijan SSR, Soviet Union
- Died: April 17, 2004 (aged 55); Kurdakhany, Baku, Azerbaijan
- Occupation: Poet
- Writing career
- Language: Azerbaijani
- Period: 1962–2004
- Genre: Satire
- Notable works: Sad Truth; What have I said...; If Karabakh goes...

Baba Punhan, born Atababa Seyidali oghlu Madatzadeh (Azerbaijani: Baba Pünhan), (5 November 1948, Baku – 17 April 2004, Baku, Azerbaijan), was an Azerbaijani poet.

== Biography ==
He was called up for military service in 1968, which he served in Kiev. He was praised for popularising Azenglish in Azerbaijani literature.

== Music ==
Throughout his career he composed numerous pieces of meykhana based on modern Azerbaijan.

== List of works ==
Baba Punhan published about 278 ghazals. His most well-known books include:

- Acı həqiqət (Sad Truth, 2000)
- Yalan çeynəyə–çeynəyə (Chewing Lies, 2000)
- Mən nə dedim ki ... (What have I said..., 2004)
