= Ummi Isa =

- Died: Unknown
- Occupation: Poet

Ummi Isa (Azerbaijani:Ümmü İsa) was the author of one of the earliest works written in Azerbaijani Turkish, the first narrative "Mehri and Vafa" in Turkic literature. According to the opinions of some researchers, Ummi Isa is considered the first poet to write in Azerbaijani Turkish.

== Life ==
Although it is known that Ummi Isa lived in the 14th century, precise birth and death years remain unknown. Professor Yaqub Babayev, based on the linguistic features and poetic linguistics of the poems attributed to Ummi Isa, has written that he lived in the 13th-14th centuries. Another literary scholar, Amil Chalabioglu, has also written that Ummi Isa lived in the 14th century. He deduced this from the information provided at the end of one of Isa's works, stating that he lived in the years 1372-1373. On the other hand, Agah Sirri asserts that Isa lived in the 15th century and did not receive a good education based on the feelings expressed in his poems.

== Creativity ==
"The sole surviving work of Isa that has reached our era is the poem 'Mehri and Vafa'. The language of the poem is simple, with very little use of Arabic and Persian languages. The linguistic characteristics of the work suggest that it was written in the colloquial language of that era. In general, Isa's language in this work is simpler compared to Dastani-Ahmad Harami and Book of Dede Korkut. But the poem's language has little grammatical difference from modern Azerbaijani Turkish.

The theme of the poem 'Mehri and Vafa' is a common one in both Iranian and Turkish literatures, originating from Persian literature and discussing the love between two young individuals. In Turkish languages, the first work on this theme was written by Ummi Isa.

There are two manuscripts of the work that have reached our era. The poem was published twice by the Institute of Manuscripts of Azerbaijan of ANAS(in 2001 and 2005). The first edition was in the Cyrillic script, and the second edition was in the Latin alphabet. In the second edition, the original text was also included in the book using the Arabic alphabet. Both manuscripts preserved in the Institute of Manuscripts of Azerbaijan were written in the 19th century.

One of them was compiled in the year 1827 by Muhammad Kamina, while the other, prepared in 1834, was by the renowned scholar, educator, and bibliophile Abdulqani Nukhavi Khalisqarizade. The first manuscript consists of 1490 verses, and the second consists of 1574 verses. In the first edition, the authors regarded the manuscript transferred by Abdulgani Nukhavi Khalisqarizade as reliable.
