= Qovsi Tabrizi =

- Born: Alijan Ismailoghlu Qovsi; First quarter of 17th century Tabriz
- Died: 17th century
- Occupation: Poet

Qovsi Tabrizi (Azerbaijani: قوسی تبریزلی; Persian: قوسی تبریزی; born Alijan Ismailoghlu Qovsi) was a 17th-century poet.

== Life ==
Qovsi Tabrizi was born in Tabriz in the first quarter of the 17th century, to an Azerbaijani family. His father, Ismail Qovsi was a craftsman and a poet. Tabrizi was educated in Isfahan and during his stay there, he wrote poems about Tabriz and often compared the two cities.

== Poetry ==
Tabrizi hated social injustice and ridiculed clergy in his works. The theme of romantic love and an idealistic and pantheistic worldview took a significant place in his lyrics. Pessimistic motifs are also present, shown in his descriptions of people's thoughts and hopes. Other features of Tabrizi's poems include a diversity of representations, forms and intonations. Qovsi Tabrizi often used literary expressions of folk language.

Collections of Tabrizi's lyrical poems are stored in two manuscripts. One is in the British Library in London and the other is in the History Museum of Georgia in Tbilisi.

== Literature ==
- Javadi, H.; Burrill, K. (1988). "Azerbaijan x. Azeri Turkish Literature". In Yarshater, Ehsan (ed.). Encyclopædia Iranica. Vol. III/3: Azerbaijan IV–Bačča(-ye) Saqqā. London and New York: Routledge & Kegan Paul. pp. 251–255. ISBN 978-0-71009-115-4.
- Johanson, Lars (2020). "Restricted Access Isfahan – Moscow – Uppsala. On Some Middle Azeri Manuscripts and the Stations Along Their Journey to Uppsala". In Csató, Éva Á.; Gren-Eklund, Gunilla; Johanson, Lars; Karakoç, Birsel (eds.). Turcologica Upsaliensia: An Illustrated Collection of Essays. Brill. pp. 167–179. ISBN 978-9004435704.
