= Vagif Bayatly Oner =

Azerbaijani poet

Vagif Bayatly Oner (Azerbaijani: Vagif Bayatlı) is an Azerbaijani poet.

== Biography ==
He was born in October 1948 in Jabrayil, a district in Karabakh.

Vagif's major books of poetry include: Under a Lonely Star, All Love Stories Will Be Forgotten, and The Funniest Dead Man. His poetry has been translated into more than 30 languages, including a major book of poetry published in Moscow (translated into Russian).

His prizes include the Mayakovski Prize for Poetry and the Jalil Mammadguluzadeh Prize founded by Azerbaijan's Press Foundation. Vagif has translated numerous works into Azerbaijani, including some of the most famous Austrian, English, Scottish, Italian, Norwegian, Turkish, and Russian poets, such as Rainer Maria Rilke, Thomas Eliot, Robert Burns, Boris Pasternak, Anna Akhmatova, Nikolay Gumilyov and Osip Mandelstam.

More than Anyone Else
(by Vagif Bayatly; translated into English by Tamam Bayatly)

I can neither be the strongest man in the world,
Nor do I want to be.
I don't want anyone to be afraid of me.

I can neither be the wealthiest man in the world,
Nor do I want to be.
For me the greatest wealth in the world,
is a tiny tent with a smiling face and eyes, with an open door and windows!

I can neither love you more than anyone else in the world,
Nor do I want to love you so.
Because only those who love insincerely
Love more than anyone else.

I want to love you quietly and gently,
I want to love you as destined by God,
Like a small bird that has nestled against the tiny corner of its nest.
