= Mir Jalal Pashayev =

Azerbaijani writer (1908–1978)

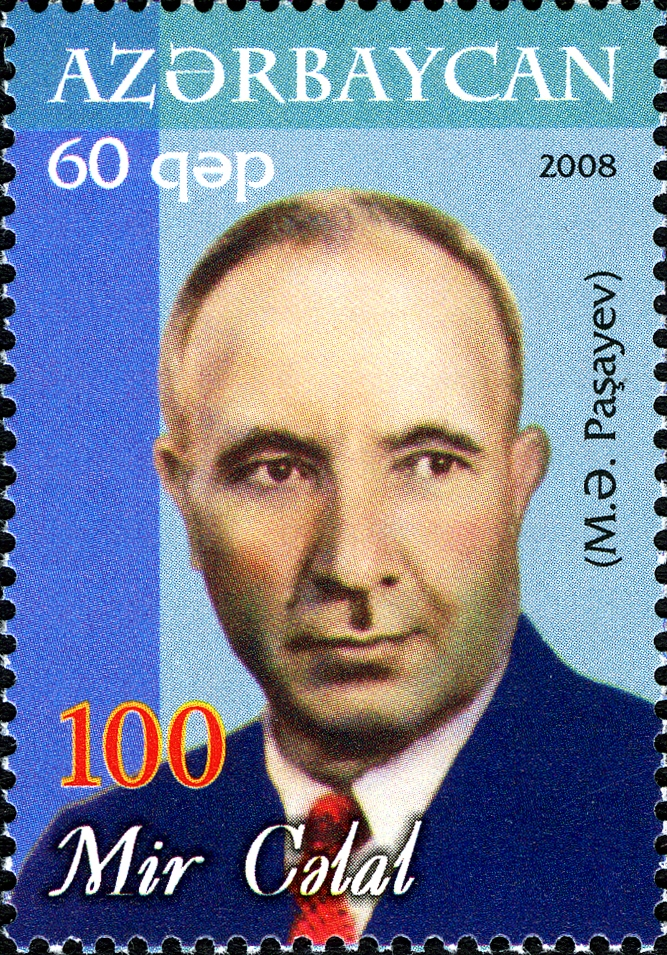

Mir Jalal Pashayev (Azerbaijani: Mir Cəlal Paşayev; 26 April 1908, Ardabil – 28 September 1978, Baku), known by his literary pen-name Mir Jalal, was an Iranian-Azerbaijanian writer and literary critic. He was the grandfather of Azerbaijan's current First Lady Mehriban Aliyeva.

== Education and career ==
Mir Jalal, who received his degree in education in 1928 in Ganja, two years later studied at Kazan University in Tatarstan, where Lenin once had been a student. Later on Mir Jalal enrolled in the Institute of Higher Education of Baku. While studying, he was doing research and writing for various newspapers. Among them the most notable was Young Worker for which many outstanding literary men of Azerbaijan contributed early in their lives. In 1933 he was working as a researcher of Azerbaijani literary history at the State University of Azerbaijan. After writing a book on the Poetry of Fuzuli, the famous fifteenth century Azeri poet, as his Master's thesis, in 1947 he completed his doctoral dissertation on Literary Schools in Azerbaijan with special emphasis on the famous satirical journal Molla Nasreddin and its writers. It was in the same year that he became a professor at the State University of Baku and devoted his life to teaching and writing.

Mir Jalal played a huge role in the improvement of Fuzuli school, the famous poet and philosopher lived in the Middle Ages, with his academic findings and research regarding the works of the famous poet. Mir Jalal also continued his research on this topic in his dissertation, the monograph “The art of Fuzuli work” has been foundation of his dissertation. In addition, his works named “Foundations of the literature”, and “20th century Azerbaijani literature” are used in the academia as a material for researchers, academics and students.

Mir Jalal Pashayev is best remembered for his satirical short stories, which poked fun at Soviet bureaucracy which had established itself in Azerbaijan when he was a mere boy of 12 years old. His glimpses of everyday life are informative and, on occasion, hilariously exaggerated, but they document the psychological transformation of a society that for generations was rewarded for denying common sense and for stifling personal intuition and initiative. Mir Jalal did not live to see the dissolution of the Soviet Union.

Pashayev co-authored the three-volume, "History of Azerbaijani Literature" (1957–1960) and wrote more than 50 books. İclas Qurusu (Dried Up in Meetings) is one of his most famous works describing how the main character's obsession with bureaucratic procedures makes him totally out of touch with the realities of his family life. His most popular books are:

- Dirilən adam (Resurrection Man, 1936)
- Bir gəncin manifesti (Manifest of a Young Man, 1938)
- Yolumuz hayanadır? (Where Are We Going?, 1957)
- Yaşıdlar (People of the Same Age, 1984).

== Awards and honors ==
- Lenin Komsomol Prize (1968)
- Order of the October Revolution (1978)
- Medal "For the Defence of the Caucasus"
- Medal "For Valiant Labour in the Great Patriotic War 1941–1945"
- Order of the Badge of Honour
- Order of the Red Banner of Labour

== Short Stories (Translated into English) ==
- Anket Anketov (1932)
- Cotton Picker (1964)
- Dissertation (1944)
- Dried Up in Meetings (1954)
- Foreign Illness (1960)
- Hey Ismayil, Make Him Understand (1962)
- Matishga (My Dear Lady) (1931)
- Peaches (1962)
- Rules of Etiquette for a Modern Wedding (1934)
- Shade of the Willow Tree (1937)
- Used to Scoldings (1962)
