= Madina Gulgun =

- Native name: Azerbaijani: Mədinə Gülgün
- Born: January 17, 1926 Baku, Azerbaijan SSR, Transcaucasian SFSR
- Died: February 17, 1992 (aged 66) Baku, Azerbaijan
- Occupation: poet, translator
- Language: Azerbaijani language
Notable awards

Madina Gulgun (Azerbaijani: Mədinə Gülgün), born Madina Nurulla qizi Alakbarzadeh (17 January 1926 in Baku – 17 February 1991 in Baku), was an Iranian-Azerbaijani poet.

== Early life and political involvement ==
Gulgun was born into an Iranian Azeri labourer's family and finished primary and middle schools in Baku. In 1938, being considered foreigners due to their Iranian citizenship, her family was forced to leave the Soviet Union and moved to Ardabil, the hometown of Gulgun's father. Upon graduation, Madina Gulgun worked as a knitter at a local factory and a reporter for the Azeri-language newspapers Azerbaijan and Vatan Yolunda. In the 1940s, she settled in Tabriz becoming a member of the Azerbaijani Democratic Party and got involved in the Soviet-backed Communist movement in Iranian Azerbaijan, which led to the establishment of the short-lived Azerbaijan People's Government. She was awarded "21 Azer" medal by the national government. After the fall of the government, she and other prominent Democrats were evacuated to Baku with the help of the Soviet agencies, while her family was sent into exile to Central Iran.

== Poetry ==
Madina Gulgun started writing poems in her teenage years. Her pseudonym Gulgun comes from the name of Jafar Jabbarli's play Od galini ("The Fire Bride"). After moving back to Baku, she was admitted to the Azerbaijan State Pedadogical Institute, majoring in Language and Literature studies. In 1950, she married poet Balash Azeroglu. After giving birth to two sons, Araz and Etibar, Madina Gulgun quit her job at a publishing house and dedicated herself to her family, while continuing to write poems (which were later published in Baku, Moscow and Tabriz). Love and patriotism were the main themes of her poetry. Some of Gulgun's poems (such as San galmaz oldun) were also made into song lyrics.
