= Mehri and Vafa =

Azerbaijani poem

Mehri and Vafa is one of the first works written in Azerbaijani language, written by Ummi Isa. The language of the poem is distinguished by its simplicity and comprehensibility, as it is written in a folkloric, colloquial language. Service to the poem "Book of Dede Korkut" and "Dastani-Ahmed Harami" "Mehri va Vafa" is written in a simpler language and is a development form for the modern reader to understand. The language of the poem is dominated by words of Turkish origin. Its grammatical structures differ only slightly from modern Azerbaijani.

== Research ==
"Mehri and Vafa", a love story with two protagonists, has common characteristics in Turkish and Iranian literature. The story, which takes its source from Iranian literature, tells about lovers meeting each other after various events and obstacles, as the theme of a classical masnavi. One of the poets of the 9th century, Arshi Dahlavi and his brother Mir Mahammad Momini Arsh have poems called "Mehri va Vafa". A copy of Mir Muhammad's "Mehri and Vafa" is registered in the Paris National Library Supp 1100. This masnavi consists of 2200 verses. The poet claims that he was the first to write the theme "Mehri and Vafa". Another literary scholar suggested that the story of Mehri and Vafa was first written by Rashidi Samarkandi in the 12th century. It is known as a romantic verse from this work of Rashidi. Dovlatshah mentions Rashidi's Mehri wa Vafa masnawi in his tazkira that "he really gave his word in that epic". Most of the Persian and Turkish "Mehri and Vafa" masnavis written later were influenced by him. The first known Mehri and Vafa masnavi in Turkish language literature was written by Ummi Isa.

The name of the author of the poem is İsa only found in the work itself. No information is found in any other source about this poet's name or details.

Literary scholars K. Sharifli and A. Sharifli brought the work to light, publishing it twice with introductory notes. A. Sharifli wrote a dissertation on the paleographic, orthographic, and lexicological research of "Mehri and Vafa".

G. Kazimov, in his "Selected Works," analyzed the language of the poem in comparison with the language of "Dastani-Ahmad Harami," providing information about its lexical and morphological structure in an attempt to determine the era it belongs to. He concluded that the creation of the poem could be attributed to a period earlier than the 13th century.

Turkish literary scholar Agah Sirri Levend notes Ummi İsa as a poet who lived in the 15th century. In his book examining pre-15th-century epic poems in Turkish literature, Amil Chelebioghlu evaluates Ummi İsa's epic as a monument from the 14th century. He mentions that the poet explicitly states in the closing verses of his epic that he completed his work in the Hijri year 774 (1372–73).

== Topic ==
The subject of the poem is as follows:

The Sultan of Rum had three sons. One day, the Sultan falls ill. Seeing his condition worsening, the viziers ask him about his will. In his last testament, the Sultan mentions that he has placed three jars in the treasury tent for his three sons. Before his death, he tells them, "In each jar, there is a wisdom, and let them govern the country with those wisdoms." When the Sultan passes away, the viziers go to the treasury and find that in the largest jar, there is soil; in the middle one, there's wax; and in the smallest, there's gold. Judging by the sizes of the jars, they decide that the soil in the big jar represents the country, which should be ruled by the eldest son, and the wax in the middle jar indicates information about the livestock of the kingdom, meant for the middle son, and the gold in the smallest jar is for the youngest son. The youngest son, named Vafa, after distributing the gold to the needy and destitute, decides to leave the kingdom. He sells the ring from his finger to buy a little food. Vafa visits the fortune teller to learn about his remaining money. The seer tells him, "You are a prince, and many things will happen to you, but eventually, you'll find happiness. You'll arrive at a city with flowing water, but you shouldn't stay in that city." Later, the seer predicts that he'll encounter a monster near a spring, then come across a treasure consisting of forty chambers and have a beautiful girl as well. Vafa, excited by what he learns, sets off and follows everything the fortune teller said. He finds both the treasure and Mehrin, along with her uncle. Upon seeing Mehrin's beauty, he falls in love with her. Later, while fleeing enemies with Mehri's uncle, they find their boat destroyed in a storm, but they are saved with the help of the prophet Khidr. Deciding to live with Mehri, Vafa discovers the forty-chambered treasure. Mehri shows him all but one room. One day, while Mehrin is asleep, Vefa finds the key and unlocks the fortieth chamber, discovering that the trees inside speak like humans. As he tries to take one of the cloaks hanging among the trees, a sudden gust of wind sweeps him away. Mehri becomes distressed upon learning about their situation and predicts that tragedies will occur, insisting on parting ways. The cloak lands in a field belonging to a farmer in the Maghreb province. The farmer takes the cloak to the village chief, who in turn brings it to the vizier. Seeing the cloak, the Sultan falls in love, claiming that "this beautiful cloak must belong to a heavenly maiden" and orders his men to find the owner of the cloak. The vizier and the nobles seek help from a famous wizard. The wizard reveals that the owner of the cloak lives in the land of the Byzantines and can bring her to the Sultan. Disguised as a poor and elderly woman, the djinn mounts a horse and arrives where Mehri and Vafa reside. Invoking Allah's name, the djinn pleads for help. Despite Mehri's reluctance to open the door, she succumbs to Vefa's insistence and lets the wizard in. As the wizard enters, she casts a spell, causing both of them to lose consciousness. The wizard slashes Vefa's throat and places the unconscious Mehri in a chest, taking her to the Sultan's palace. When Mehri wakes up and sees the Sultan, she, in this state, seeks permission from the Sultan to spend a year mourning her beloved by living with her aunt in another palace to escape the situation. Finally, the Sultan accepts this condition, believing that Mehrin will come willingly. Mourning for her beloved, Mehri dyes all her clothes black. The Sultan, upon seeing his lover's condition, declares a mourning period throughout the country, forcing everyone in the kingdom to wear black. Learning that Vafa has spent all his wealth, his brothers become concerned about his wish. The middle brother sets out to find Vafa and visits the fortune teller. The seer first cries and then laughs. Upon reaching the palace, he hears that his brother Vafa has been killed and mourns. Khidr arrives and resurrects Vefa. Once revived, Vafa immediately asks for Mehri. Despite the warning from his middle brother, Vefa insists on finding his beloved. He takes two cloaks left in the garden, an everlasting flower, and a bag of gold and sets off. Traveling for eleven months and asking about Mehri at every encounter, Vefa arrives in the Maghreb province. Placing the flower on a servant's tray, Vafa's gesture through the fragrance is recognized by Mehri, who sends word to the Sultan to prepare for the celebration. Mehri gives Vafa the horses sent by the Sultan. While the wedding feast is in full swing, Mehri and Vafa leave for a cave to hide. The following day, realizing the situation, the Sultan sends the djinn to find Mehrin. Failing to find the two lovers, the Sultan kills the djinn in frustration. Driven mad by love, the Sultan sets out barefoot to find Mehri.

Afterward, Vafa and Mehri face new adventures. First, a slave, then a jeweler tries to seize Mehri. However, through measures and cunning, Mehri escapes from their clutches. Consequently, Mehri and Vafa part ways. Mehri arrives in a country where she is made a queen. Vafa, searching tirelessly, eventually arrives there. Recognizing her from a deliberately drawn symbol placed in a prominent location in the city, Vafa finds her. They meet, and after celebrating their wedding, Mehri passes her queenship to Vafa.

=== Characters ===
The story divides people into two factions: those allied with the main protagonists and those against them. The narrative includes non-human entities as characters as well. Except for the main protagonists (Mehri and Vefa), all other characters are either allied with the lovers or strive to separate them.

Allies of the main protagonists: Khidr, Elijah, the aged vizier, Vafa's older brother, younger brother, and the gardener.

Opposed to the main protagonists: The Maghreb-Sultan of the Earth, vizier, Sultan of Zengid, jeweler, wizard, devout woman, master, neighbor woman.

Mehri represents the equivalent of the beloved in classic literature. However, unlike the typical romantic figure, Mehri doesn't emerge with her fierceness or sufferings. Her most significant traits are compassion and intelligence. Mehri is the daughter of the Sultan of Oman. Referred to in the narrative as Mehr, Mehri Banu, or simply Banu, she possesses legendary beauty. Mehri is so stunning that Vefa loses his senses when he first sees her. This incident recurs seven times. While establishing Mehri's traits in the narrative, hyperboles are often used. For instance, when Mehri is mentioned, phrases like "an angel seated on the throne, her radiance illuminating the entire palace" exemplify this. Beyond her external attributes, Mehri is also incredibly intelligent. She has the ability to foresee events beforehand. Mehri is the one who overcomes the challenges created by Vefa. It's for this reason that she is portrayed as a strong female character in the narrative. As intelligent as she is, Mehri is also compassionate. At the story's end, she doesn't punish the men she captured; instead, she gives each twenty thousand gold coins and sends them back to their homes.

Vafa is the youngest son of the Sultan of Rum. In the courtly literature, like Mehri, he also embodies the role of a lover. In the court poetry, Vafa represents the image of a tearful lover. One of Vafa's other traits is his significant weakness compared to Mehri. In the story, Vafa becomes the cause of all the events that lead to the separation of the lovers. Nevertheless, like Mehri, Vafa is also a compassionate individual. He spends all the gold from a chest to help the poor. Despite those who took Mehri away, he doesn't seek revenge.

== Language features ==
"Mehri and Vafa" mesnevi utilizes a simple language. Although there are few, Arabic and Persian words are used. However, the predominant words in the poem are of Turkish origin. The language of the work closely resembles the spoken language of that period. Compared to "Kitabi-Dede Qorqud" and "Dastani-Ahmad Harami," the "Mehri and Vafa" poem is written in a simpler language, understandable for modern readers. The grammatical structures in the poem differ very little from modern Azerbaijani.

The "Mehri and Vafa" mesnevi is composed in the meter of the aruz verse. It uses the measure known as "Fâ¡ilatün fâ¡ilatün fâ¡ilün," which is recognized as a classical mesnevi meter. Attempts have been made to adjust some words to fit the meter in the work. Especially in cases where it's challenging to adapt Turkish words to the aruz meter, Arabic and Persian words are substituted. The rhyme structure of the work is quite organized.

One of the notable aspects of the work is the archaism in its language and grammar. This aspect indicates that the language of "Mehri and Vefa" is closer to the language of earlier works such as "Kitabi-Dede Qorqud". Many of the indigenous Azerbaijani-Turkish words exhibit phonetic and lexical archaisms. There are also a considerable number of borrowings, with a ratio similar to the Turkish-origin words in "Dede Qorqud".

The language, style, and idiomatic expressions in "Mehri and Vafa" are very close to those in "Ahmad Harami's Dastan".

A. Sharifli writes: "In general, along with the use of our epics and tales, the influence of Nizami's creativity is also felt here. Especially the details of "The Tale of the Maid in Black" in "Seven Beauties" come to mind. As in Nizami's work, Vafa comes to the country dressed in Black and finds Mehri there. The fact that Mehri does everything cautiously, intelligently, logically, and at the same time courageously reminds the heroes of Nizami's works, etc.

== Manuscripts and publications ==
The poem has been published twice (in 2001 and 2005) under the auspices of the Institute of Manuscripts named after Muhammad Fuzuli at the Azerbaijan National Academy of Sciences. The first publication, prepared by Kamandar and Aysel Sharifli, was in Cyrillic alphabet with a preface encompassing 2.5 pages and included a glossary of difficult words. The work was printed with a comprehensive preface by Professor Rafiq Aliyev, the director of the "Irshad" Center for Islamic Studies, under the editorship of M.Z. Nagiyev and M.M. Adilov. The title page honored it as a "Rare Monument of Our Literature and Language." The second edition was printed in the Latin script, also including the text in the Arabic alphabet (calligrapher M. Azizov). The version presented in the Arabic script helped identify differences in the texts. The scientific and critical text of the manuscript, translated into the current alphabet, prepared for publication, preface, and glossary author is Aysel Sharifova. The preface in this edition is concise. There are two surviving manuscripts of the work. Both versions of the manuscripts, preserved in the Manuscripts Institute of the Azerbaijan National Academy of Sciences that have come down to us, were transcribed in the 19th century. One was transcribed in 1827 by Mahammad Kemine, and the other in 1834 by the renowned scholar, educator, and bibliographer Abdulghani Nukhavi Khalisaqarizade. The first manuscript consists of 1490 verses, while the second has 1574. The authors of the first edition considered the manuscript transcribed by Abdulghani Nukhavi as reliable, stating: "Despite Abdulghani Nukhavi transcribing the manuscript at a young age, he endeavored to preserve its spelling peculiarities and refrained from interfering with its language and style."

The authors consider this manuscript transcribed earlier. Regarding the version transcribed by Mahammad Kemine in 1827, they write: "While transcribing the text of the poem, Mahammad Kemine allowed numerous abridgments, additions, and alterations, resulting in a corrupted version of the 'Mehri və Vəfa' poem. Unlike Abdulghani Nukhavi's manuscript, in Mahammad Kemine's manuscript, the preamble of the poem, consisting of 28 verses, was abridged. Furthermore, several verses in the text of the work were entirely changed, additional verses were inserted into some episodes, and in certain parts, individual verses were truncated. Additionally, some of the archaisms in the poem's language were replaced with more modern variations."

"Mehri and Vafa" epic has three manuscripts housed in Turkish libraries:[16]

- Izmir National Library, Manuscript No. 26/668. This manuscript is written in prose and measures 210x145 mm in size.
- Atatürk University Library, Seyfeddin Ozege Catalog, has two copies, numbered 282 and 283. These manuscripts are handwritten, consisting of 19 lines and 61 pages. Although the poem is written in a poetic narrative style, the classical elements like the usual invocation, monotheism, and supplication parts are incomplete in these copies. The poem comprises 795 verses and, despite being quite extensive, it doesn't possess a large volume. Its significance lies in reflecting the language peculiarities of its era. The copyist added the following date at the end: "Temmetu’l-kitab bi-câni’l-lahi’l-mülkü’l-vehhab tarix il 1208 fî 17". There are occasional disruptions in the rhyme scheme due to alterations within lines, and some numbering discrepancies exist in the manuscript, primarily originating from mistakes in the original text.
- Marbur Staatsbibliothek, Manuscript No. Ms.Or.Okt 2628.
