= Bahar Shirvani =

19th-century poet from Shirvan (1840s–1880s)

Bahar Shirvani was a 19th-century poet from Shirvan, who was active under Naser al-Din Shah Qajar (r. 1848–1896), the Qajar shah (king) of Iran.

Bahar Shirvani's birth date has been put as 1831, 1835 and 1837. In Tabriz, he served as the secretary of the French Consulate. There he was also assigned with the education of Iraj Mirza. Bahar Shirvani died in 1883 or 1886. Some scholars considered him to have died at Mirza Mohammad Kazem Saburi's house in Mashhad, while others considered him to have died in Tehran or Tabriz.

Bahar Shirvani wrote poetry in Persian and Azerbaijani Turkish. He adopted the style of his predecessors and leaned towards the Khorasani style.

== Sources ==
- Tahqiqi, Leila (2019). "بهار شیروانی". The Great Islamic Encyclopaedia (in Persian).
