= Abbas Sahhat =

Azerbaijani poet

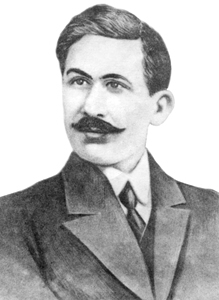
- Abbas Sahhat
- Born: 1874; Shamakhi, Baku Governorate, Russian Empire (in present-day Azerbaijan)
- Died: 11 July 1918 (aged 43–44); Ganja, Azerbaijan
- Education: Madraseh-ye Nezamiyyeh-ye Nasiriyyeh, Tehran
- Occupations: Physician, journalist, teacher, translator

Abbas Sahhat (Azerbaijani: Abbas Səhhət, born Abbasgulu Aliabbas oglu Mehdizadeh; 1874 Shamakhi), was an Azerbaijani poet and dramatist.

== Life and career ==
Abbas Sahhat was born into the family of a cleric in the city of Shamakhi. He received his primary education from his father. At age 15 he started writing amateur poems. Beginning in 1892 he studied medicine in Mashhad and Tehran. After returning to Shamakhi around 1900 he abandoned his professional field, as Russian institutions did not recognize medical diplomas from Iran. Sahhat started teaching Azeri and literature first in primary schools and then in a Realschule. This period is considered the beginning of his career as a poet and playwright. In 1903 he began writing articles for the Azeri-language newspaper Sharg-i Rus, published in Tiflis. His articles mostly discussed topics in contemporary literature.

As a poet, Sahhat adhered generally to romanticism. His poetry was influenced by Ali bey Huseynzade, editor of the Füyuzat magazine in 1905–1907. Sahhat also translated works of Pushkin, Lermontov, Nadson, Krylov, Hugo, Musset, Prudhomme, Amir Khusro as well as a number of German poets into Azeri.

In 1912 he published his first collection of poems entitled Sinig saz ("Broken Saz"), his narrative poem Ahmadin shujaati and his translations of Western European literature under the name Garb gunashi ("The Sun of the West"). In 1916 his romantic poem Shah, muza va shaharli was published. In his literary style, influence of classical poets such as Nizami, Hafez and Saadi, and modern poets such as Tevfik Fikret, is seen.

Among his dramatic pieces, Neft fontani (1912) and Yoxsullug ayib deyil (1913) are noteworthy. There are accounts of a novel written by Sahhat and entitled Ali and Aisha. It was never published and its manuscript is believed to have perished during the Dashnak occupation of Shamakhi in April 1918, when Sahhat's house was ravaged and burned. The poet himself managed to escape the town with his family, fleeing first to Kurdamir and later to Ganja, where he died some months later of a stroke.

Abbas Sahhat was in favour of liberal bourgeoisie and, due to his Iranian academic upbringing, disagreed with mass secularisation that was taking place among Azeris beginning in the early 20th century. Instead he promoted a more moderate idea of all-Muslim westernization. He dedicated some of his finest pieces of poetry to the Iranian Constitutional Revolution, in which he presented himself as a realist poet.
