= Kishvari =

15th- and 16th-century Azerbaijani poet

- Born: Nematullah Kishvari; Salmas, Aq Qoyunlu
- Died: Tabriz, Safavid Iran
- Occupation: Poet
- Writing career
- Language: Azerbaijani; Persian
- Notable work: Kişvarī Dīvānı

Nematullah Kishvari (Note: Also spelled as "Nimetullah Kishveri".) (Azerbaijani: Nemətulla Kişvəri, نعمت‌الله کشوری) was a 15th- and 16th-century poet. He is considered one of the leading poets of Azerbaijani literature during that time and his poems played a significant role in the development of the Azerbaijani literary language.

Born in Salmas in modern-day Iran, little is known about Kishvari's life. He spent a part of it in the palace of Aq Qoyunlu ruler Yaqub Beg in Tabriz, where he was in the company of other prominent poets. However, he left the palace when he was repeatedly asked to write eulogies for Yaqub Beg and moved to Samarkand to live with Timurid poet Ali-Shir Nava'i, whom he referred to as his master in his poems. After Yaqub Beg's death in 1490, he returned to Tabriz but faced financial difficulties. In his last years, he dedicated eulogies to Ismail I of the Safavid dynasty of Iran and died in Tabriz a few years after his return.

Kishvari's only surviving work is a dīvān (a collection of poems) written mostly in Azerbaijani, with some Persian poems included. His poetry is primarily about love and was heavily influenced by Ali-Shir Nava'i and the 14th- and 15th-century Azerbaijani poet Nasimi.

== Biography ==
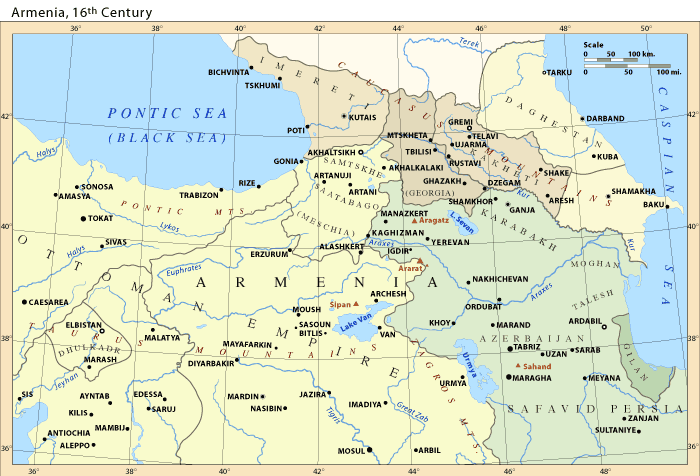
Map of Azerbaijan (south of Araks) and surrounding region, 16th century

Not much is known about the life of Kishvari, including his exact birth date. The majority of information about him is derived from his poetry. Born in Dilmagan (now Salmas) in modern-day Iran, his poems suggest that he likely lived during the latter part of the 15th century and the early part of the 16th century. His given name was "Nematullah", and his surname, as well as the name he used in his poems, was "Kishvari". Kishvari's poetry was first brought to light by the Turkish literary historian İsmail Hikmet Ertaylan in 1928. In 1946, his only known work, a dīvān (a collection of poems), was discovered.

At some point of his life, Kishvari relocated to Tabriz. There, he resided in the palace of Yaqub Beg (r. 1478–1490) of the Aq Qoyunlu, where he lived alongside other Azerbaijani poets such as Ahmadi Tabrizi, Khatai Tabrizi, and Habibi, with whom he was friends. However, he left the palace after being compelled to continuously compose qaṣīdahs (eulogies) for Yaqub Beg and relocated to Samarkand to live with Ali-Shir Nava'i, a Timurid poet, whom he referred to as his master in his poems. After Yaqub Beg's death in 1490, Kishvari returned to Tabriz because of his old age and the difficulties of living abroad. His poems reveal that he experienced financial hardships after his return and expressed a longing for the "old days". His final years coincided with the reign of Ismail I (r. 1501–1524), the founder of the Safavid dynasty of Iran. The poet dedicated one ghazal (a form of amatory poem) and one rübā'ī (a four-line poem) to Ismail I. He died in Tabriz a few years later, although the exact year of his death remains unknown.

== Poetry ==
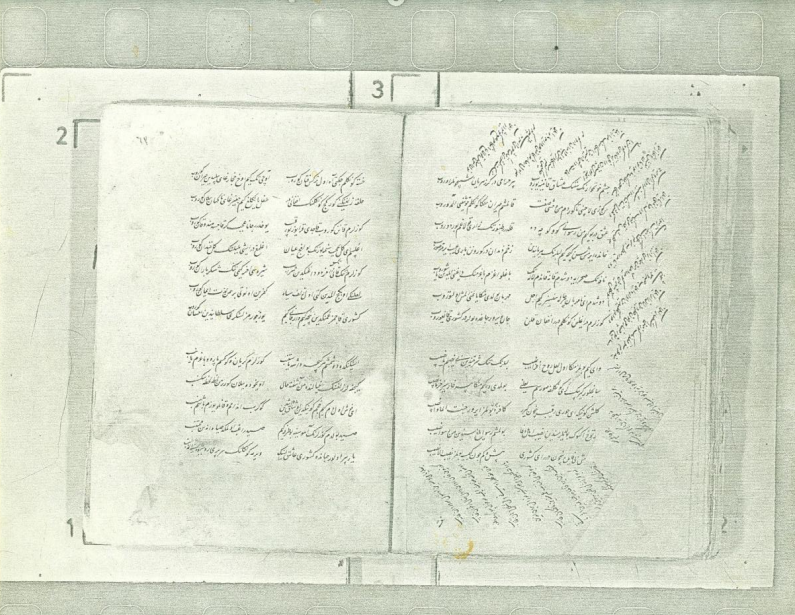
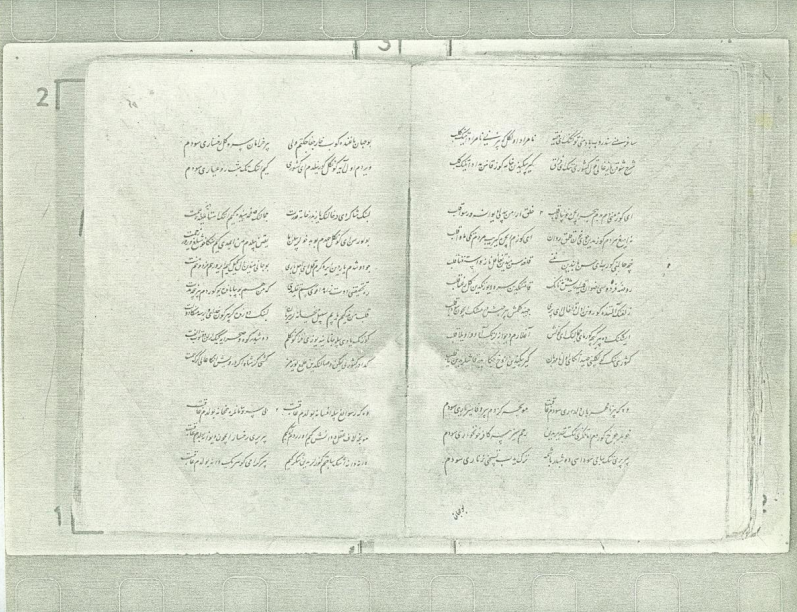
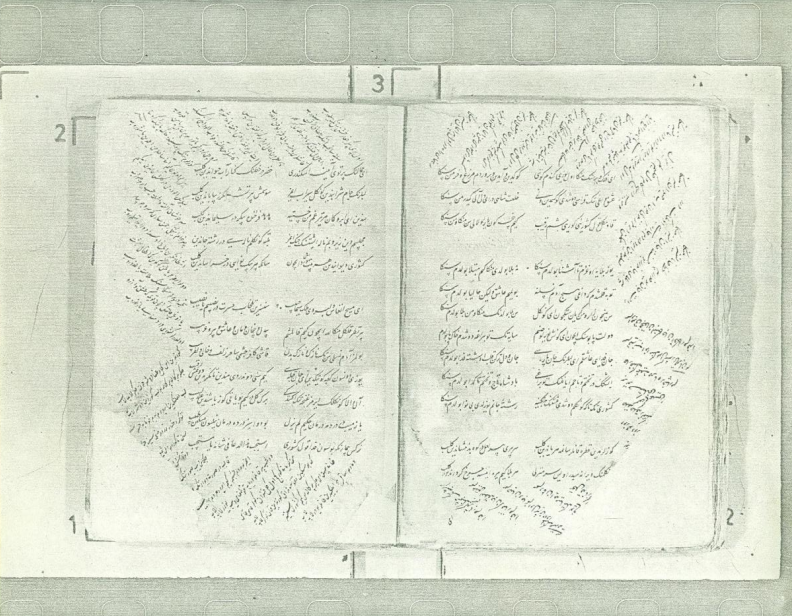
Manuscripts of the Kişvarī Dīvānı

The only known work of Kishvari is a dīvān, titled Kişvarī Dīvānı (lit. 'dīvān of Kishvari'). Primarily written in Azerbaijani, this work also includes some Persian poems and features a variety of poetic forms, such as 799 ghazals, 42 rübā'īs, three tarjī'bands (poems with repeating verses), and several qiṭ'ahs (a form of monorhyme poetry). In the work, Kishvari often creates new vocabulary by adding Turkic suffixes to Persian or Arabic words, or by appending Persian suffixes to Turkic words. Many of his poems praise the officials and their families in the countries where the poet resided, including Yaqub Beg, his mother Selçuk Şah Begüm, cousins of Yaqub Beg, and the Safavid king Ismail I. The main theme of his poetry is love, with a few mystical poems included. Love and the beauty of nature are also the focus of his ghazals. Six copies of the dīvān are known to exist and are located in Bursa and Istanbul (Turkey), Baku (Azerbaijan), Samarkand and Tashkent (Uzbekistan), and Tehran (Iran). The Bursa and Tehran copies were first researched by Jale Demirci, a scholar of Turkic literature, in 1994. The Baku copy, which dates back to 1690, is almost identical to the Tashkent and Samarkand copies. Demirci concluded that this is because the Tashkent and Samarkand copies were made from the Baku copy. Ümran Ay Say, a scholar of Turkish literature, states that the dīvān does not follow the prescribed order of verse forms, but it does follow the alphabetical order in its ghazals. The primary poetic form in the dīvān is the bayt (a line divided into two hemistichs of equal length, each containing between 16 and 32 syllables); the main poetic genre, on the other hand, is the ghazal.

Kishvari's poetry was heavily influenced by Ali-Shir Nava'i, as well as the 14th- and 15th-century Azerbaijani poet Nasimi. Ay Say states that the "abundance of nazires" (Note: According to Demirci, Kishvari wrote five nazires to Nava'i.) (poems written in the style of another poet's work) Kishvari composed for Nava'i "clearly demonstrate the influence of Nava'i on the poet's literary personality". Demirci considers Kishvari to be one of the two Azerbaijani poets most profoundly influenced by Nava'i, the other being the 16th-century poet Fuzuli. According to Demirci, Kishvari's poems express his admiration for Nava'i's "greatness and influence", as well as his desire to serve him. Nava'i's influence is also evident in the language of Kishvari's poems, which show a strong Chagatai influence, a Turkic literary language once widely spoken throughout Central Asia and whose greatest representative was Nava'i. The influence of Chagatai can be observed in the vocabulary, phonetics, and morphological elements of the dīvān. Folk literature's influence can also be seen in Kishvari's lyric poems. He incorporates numerous words and phrases from the Turkic spoken language and various regional dialects into his poetry.

Muharrem Kasımlı, a Turkish scholar of literature, found Kishvari's poems to be indicative of his deep understanding of both Turkic and Islamic cultures. Demirci characterises Kishvari's poems as having a "flowing, simple, and sincere" style, while Arasly distinguishes it by "the simplicity of the language" and "the richness of the ways of representation". The Azerbaijani scholar Roza Eyvazova regards Kishvari's poetry as "very artistic and interesting". She characterises his verses as vibrant and full of life, marked by their "simplicity of language, clarity of thought, sincerity, [and] fluidity".

== Legacy ==
Kishvari's poetry played a significant role in the development of the Azerbaijani literary language during its formation period in the 15th and 16th centuries. He is considered one of the most prominent representatives of Azerbaijani literature during this time. Eyvazova views his poetry to be "one of the most valuable resources" to the evolution of the Azerbaijani literary language, and as a cornerstone in establishing the historical grammar of the language. She also believes that his dīvān holds special importance for the historical comparative study of Turkic languages, because of the variety of Turkic forms used within it. Kishvari's poetry also influenced future Azerbaijani poets. He is considered to represent a transitional period between the eras of Nasimi and Fuzuli, two poets regarded as among the greatest in Azerbaijani literature. According to Demirci, the existence of copies of the poet's work from Turkey to Central Asia demonstrates the wide popularity his poetry enjoyed.
