= Mammad Araz =

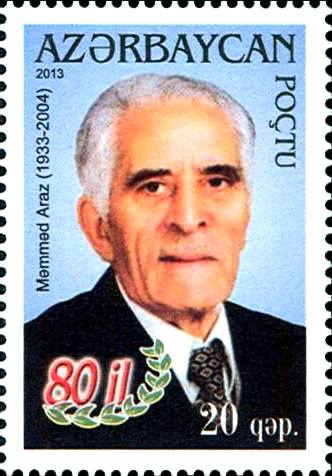
- Mammad Araz on Azerbaijani stamp
- Born: Mammad Ibrahimov; October 14, 1933; Nursu, Nakhchivan, Azerbaijan SSR, USSR
- Died: December 1, 2004 (aged 71); Baku, Azerbaijan
- Occupation: Poet
- Writing career
- Language: Azerbaijani
- Genre: Poetry
- Notable works: If There Were No War; The World is Yours, The World is Mine

Mammad Araz (Azerbaijani: Məmməd Araz, pronounced [mæˈmæd ɑˈɾɑz]; born Mammad Ibrahimov [Məmməd İbrahimov]; 14 October 1933 in – 1 December 2004) was an Azerbaijani poet. His pen name, Araz, is the Azerbaijani spelling for the Aras river.

== Early life ==
In 1954, he graduated with degrees in geography from Azerbaijan's Pedagogical Institute. Araz has also worked in the editorial offices of Maarif Publication House in Baku, Ulduz Magazine (1967–1970), Literature and Art newspaper (1970–1972) and Azerbaijan State Publication House (1972–1974). He has also worked for a long time as editor of "Nature of Azerbaijan" magazine since 1974.

== Family ==
- He is the father of publicist Irada Tuncay.
- The writer-journalist is the father-in-law of MP Agil Abbas.
- The poet is Rehile Elchin's uncle.

== Poetry ==
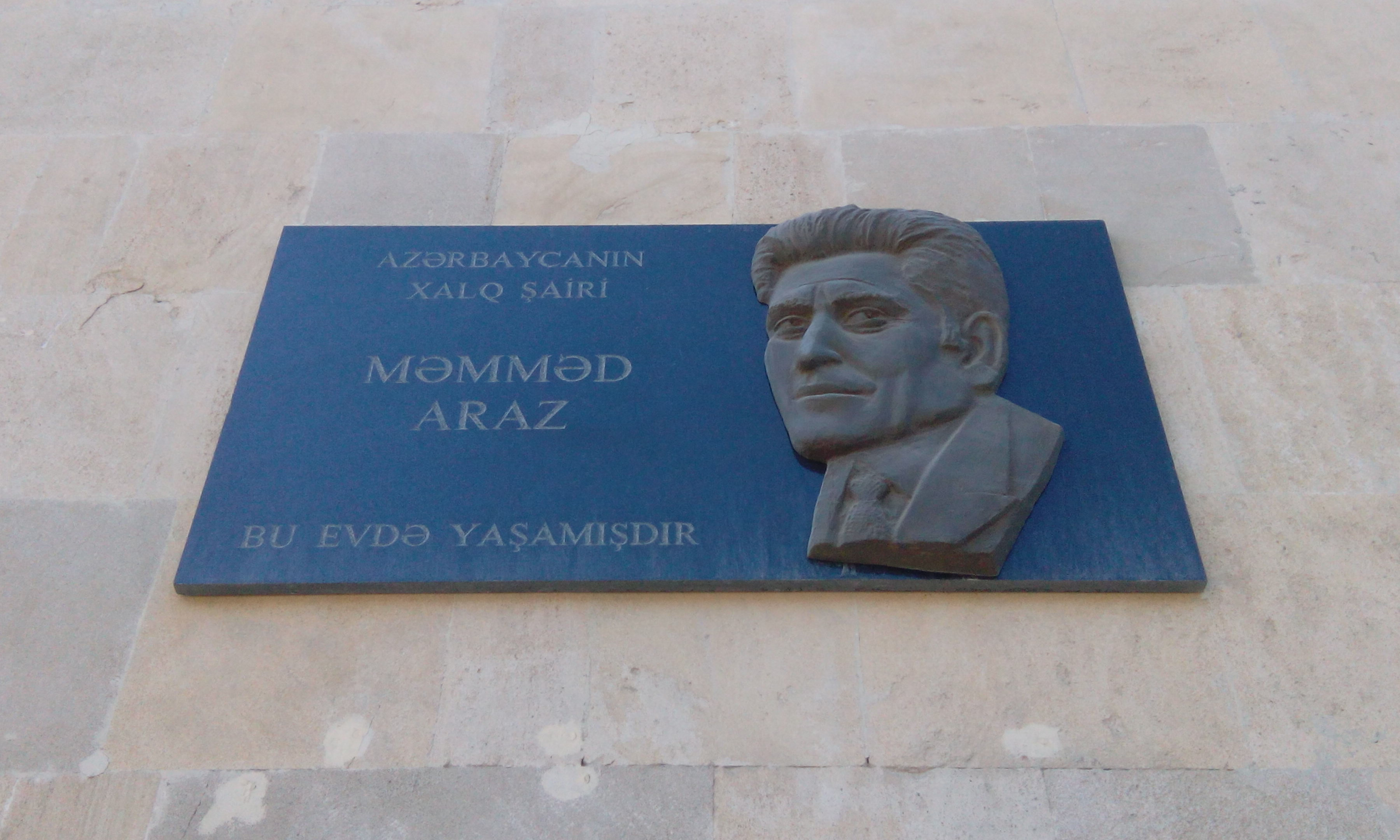
Plaque on building where Mammad Araz lived in Baku

He is also the author of "The World is Yours, The World is Mine" (Dunya Sanin, Dunya Manim) poem, which was the lyrics of a very popular music hit in Azerbaijan in the 90s. The first book of poems of him called "Love song" (in Azerbaijan-Sevgi nəğməsi) was published in 1959 by "Azerneshr".

Mammad Araz's manuscript - Baku 1992

Some of Araz's famous works include:

- If There Were No War
- The World is Yours, The World is Mine
- The Sound Written on the Rocks
- Father of Three Sons
- Come on, Rise Up, Azerbaijan!(1992)

His works published in English by Betty Blair, such as:

If There Were No War (1956)

If there were no war,
We could construct a bridge between Earth and Mars
Melting weapons in an open-hearth furnace.

If there were no war,
The harvest of a thousand years could grow in one day.
Scientists could bring the moon and stars to Earth.

== Recognition ==
Araz has been recognized with the following awards: Honored Culture Worker of Azerbaijan (1978), Laureate of Republican State Award (1988) and "Istiglal" (Independence) Order.
