= Alemdar Hasanoğlu =

Azerbaijani mathematician

Alemdar Hasanoğlu (Azerbaijani: Aləmdar Həsənoğlu) is an Azerbaijani mathematician. He was born in Baku in 1954.

== Biography ==
He received the degree of B.S. in Mathematics from Baku State University, Azerbaijan and received the degrees of M.S., Ph.D. in Computational Mathematics, Dr. Sc. in Mathematical Modeling and Computational Technology in Science from the Special Scientific Committee at the Moscow State University.

== Research work ==
Research interests of Professor Hasanoğlu include nonlinear differential equations, variational methods, inverse problems, mathematical and computational modeling in engineering sciences. He is an author of more than 100 scientific papers in international journals and conference proceedings, author of 4 books and co-author of 7 books, and conference proceedings, co-editor of special issues. His research projects have been supported by U.S.S.R Academy of Sciences institutions (1982–1989), Kocaeli Governorship, Arcelik A. S., Istanbul Municipality, TUBİTAK, Turkey (1994–2009), Office of Naval Research, USA (2002), INTAS, Brussels (2007–2009), and Science for Peace and Security Section, NATO, Brussels (2008–2010).

== Awards ==
Hasanoğlu received numerous honors and awards for his work, including the USSR Academy of Science Medal and Diploma of Honor and the best scientific work, "Computational Express-Diagnostics Method for Constructional Medium". He also received various research and teaching awards from Moscow State, Baku State, and Kocaeli University, and also from Kocaeli Governorship/Municipality. He is an honorary professor of L.N. Gumilev Eurasian National University, Astana, Kazakhstan.

Page text.
