= Rahilya Geybullayeva =

Azerbaijani researcher (born 1961)

Rahilya Geybullayeva (born January 30, 1961) is a well known Azerbaijani researcher in comparative literature, theory of literature and Azerbaijani literature. Geybullayeva is a founder and president of the Azerbaijani Association of Comparative Literature. She has been a panel member at various well-known universities, including Harvard University, MIT, the London School of Economics and University College London.

In 2003, Geybullayeva was coordinator of the Azerbaijani Mougham project for the UNESCO “Masterpieces of Intangible Heritage” programme. She is a member of the National Committee for Protection of Oral and Intangible Heritage (Azerbaijan National Academy of Sciences for UNESCO).

At present, Geybullayeva is an active researcher and the head of the Journalism Department at Baku Slavic University.

She has three sons and currently resides in Baku, Azerbaijan.
