= Television in Azerbaijan =

Television in Azerbaijan was introduced in 1956, when Azerbaijan was still known as the Azerbaijani SSR.

Azerbaijan has a total of 47 television channels, of which 4 are public television channels and 43 are private television channels of which 12 are national television channels and 31 regional television channels. According to the Ministry of Communications and Information Technologies of Azerbaijan, the television penetration rate is 99% according to 2014 data. The penetration rate of cable television in Azerbaijan totaled 28.1% of households in 2013, from a study by the State Statistical Committee of the Azerbaijan Republic. Almost 39% of the cable television subscriber base is concentrated in major cities. The penetration rate of cable television totaled 59.1% in the city of Baku in 2013.

== List of channels ==
This is a list of television channels that broadcast in Azerbaijan.

=== State-owned ===
Name	Owner	Launched
AzTV	Azerbaijan TV and Radio Programme Society (state-owned)	1956
İdman Azərbaycan	Azerbaijan TV and Radio Programme Society (state-owned)	2009
İTV	İctimai Television and Radio Broadcasting Company	2005
Mədəniyyət TV	Azerbaijan TV and Radio Programme Society (state-owned)	2011

=== Private ===
==== Nationwide ====
Name	Owner	Launched	Notes
Space TV	Space Independent Television and Radio Company	12 October 1997	
Xazar TV	Xazar Media Center (SOCAR)	11 January 2000	Originally launched as STV Xazar; rebranded on 5 October 2007.
ATV	Azad Azerbaijan TV and Radio Broadcasting Company	25 December 2000	
CBC TV	SOCAR Media Public Union	24 December 2009	Originally launched as ATV International; rebranded on 10 April 2013. Satellite and cable channel.
ARB 24	ARB Media Group	1 June 2010	Originally launched as Türkel TV; rebranded on 19 September 2016.
MTV Azerbaijan	MTV Azerbaijan	11 May 2012	Satellite and cable channel
ARB	ARB Media Group	10 May 2014	Originally launched as Region TV; rebranded on 19 September 2016.
ARB Günəş	ARB Media Group	1 April 2015	Originally launched as Günəş TV; rebranded on 19 September 2016. Available nationwide via satellite and cable.
CBC Sport	SOCAR Media Public Union	1 November 2015	
Baku TV	Global Media Group	18 February 2018	Internet-based, satellite, and cable channel
Real TV	Real Analysis and Information Center LLC	15 March 2018	

==== Regional ====
Name	Owner	Launched	Headquartered	Serving	Reference(s)
AOLTV	"A" MMC	2004	Tartar	Yukhari Garabakh, Kalbajar-Lachin	
ARB Canub	ARB Media Group	2006	Lankaran	Lankaran, Aran Economic Region	
ARB Shimal	ARB Media Group	2007	Khachmaz	Guba-Khachmaz, Shaki-Zaqatala, Dagligh Shirvan	
AS-TV	AS TV Society	2007	Astara	Lankaran	
B1 TV	"N" AMC	2006	Naftalan	Yukhari Garabakh, Ganja-Gazakh	
Daily Azerbaijan	DA1	2013	Zakatala	Shaki-Zaqatala	
Dünya TV	Dünya TV Company	1999	Sumgait	Absheron Economic Region, Guba-Khachmaz	
EL TV	EL TV MMC	2009	Yevlakh	Aran Economic Region, Ganja-Gazakh, Yukhari Garabakh	
Intimacy TV	East-West Company	2012	Imishli	Aran Economic Region, Yukhari Garabakh	
Kanal-S	Kanal-S Mahdud Masuliyyatli Society	2008	Shaki	Shaki-Zaqatala, Ganja-Gazakh, Aran Economic Region	
Kanal N	NMR	2007	Ordubad	Nakhchivan	
Kapaz TV	Kapaz TV Company	1993	Ganja	Ganja-Gazakh, Yukhari Garabakh, Kalbajar-Lachin	
LL 33	SSMCC	1998	Dashkasan	Ganja-Gazakh, Yukhari Garabakh, Kalbajar-Lachin	
Nakhchivan TV	State Committee for Television and Radio Broadcasting of the Nakhchivan Autonomous Republic	1963	Nakhchivan	Nakhchivan Autonomous Republic	
News2 TV	"A" MMC	2003	Barda	Yukhari Garabakh, Aran Economic Region	
PTV	PLOC	2011	Qax	Shaki-Zaqatala	
Qafqaz TV	Qafqaz Independent TV and Radio	1998	Quba	Guba-Khachmaz, Daghlig Shirvan, Absheron Economic Region	
Razi TV	Razi Television and Radio	2014	Beylaqan	Aran Economic Region, Yukhari Garabakh, Dagligh Shirvan	
Regional TV	ASB+	2007	Shamakhi	Dagligh Shirvan, Shaki-Zaqatala, Aran Economic Region	
SM TV	SSMCC	2002	Shamkir	Ganja-Gazakh, Kalbajar-Lachin	
Shirvan TV	Region Company	2002	Shirvan	Aran Economic Region	
Sumgait TV	Sumgait City Radio & TV Company	2001	Sumgait	Absheron Economic Region, Guba-Khachmaz	
TVT	Tovuz Production	1998	Tovuz	Ganja-Gazakh, Kalbajar-Lachin, Yukhari Garabakh	

== Discontinued ==
=== State-owned ===
Name	Launched	Defunct
AzTV 2	1992	2005

=== Private ===
Name	Owner	Launched	Defunct	Headquarters	Reference(s)
ABA		1999	2001	Baku	
ANS TV		1991	2016	Baku	
ARB Ulduz	ARB Media Group	2001	2019	Ganja	
Aygün TV		1996	2014	Zaqatala	
Baku TV		1992	1996	Baku	
BMTI		1993	1994	Baku	
Dalğa TV		2017	2021	Baku	
Kanal 35	Ministry of Education, Nakhchivan Autonomous Republic	2004	2023	Nakhchivan	
KL 350		1991	1991		
LTV		1996	2002		
Lankaran TV		2000	2005		
Lider TV		2000	2021	Baku	
Mingachevir TV	Vahid Mammadov	1998	2021	Mingachevir	
Qütb TV		1995	2015	Quba	
Simurg M TV	Simurq M TV Company	1995	2007		
Sara TV		1992	1999		
Shou+ TV		1999	2008		
Super Channel		1993	1994		
Tolerance TV		2004	2009		
TTR-TV		1997	2003		
ÜMİD TV		2005	2012		
Yevlakh TV	Yevlakh TV LLC	2006	2009	Yevlakh	

== Most viewed channels ==
Position	Channel	Share of total viewing (%)
1	ITV	12.0
2	ATV	10.5
3	Space TV	5.0
4	Xazar TV	4.4
5	Lider TV (defunct in 2021)	4.0
6	AzTV	3.5
7	ARB	2.9
8	Idman TV	2.5
9	Kapaz TV	2.0
10	GunAz TV	1.9
11	Medeniyyet TV	1.8
12	Real TV	1.6
13	ARB 24	1.1
14	CBC	1.0

== See also ==
- Television in the Soviet Union
