= ARB =

ARB, ARb or arb may refer to:

== Brands and enterprises ==
- ARB, Inc., predecessor of Primoris Services Corporation
- American Research Bureau
- ARB (Azerbaijani TV channel), an Azerbaijani television network
- ARB 24, an Azerbaijani television news channel
- ARB 4x4 Accessories
- ARB Günəş, an Azerbaijani children's television channel
- Amanah Raya Berhad, a Malaysian trustee company

== Computing ==
- Arb, arbitrary-precision package, part of FLINT: Fast Library for Number Theory
- OpenGL Architecture Review Board
  - ARB assembly language, for GPU instructions

== Government ==
- Administrative Review Board (Labor) of the US Department of Labor
- Air Resources Board, California Environmental Protection Agency
- Architects Registration Board, UK statutory body

== Language ==
- Arb (gesture), hand signals used on financial trading floors
- Modern Standard Arabic (ISO 639-3 code)

== Military ==
- Administrative Review Board, for prisoners in the Guantánamo Bay detention camps
- Air Rescue Boat
- Two US Navy hull classification symbols: Battle damage repair ship (ARB) and Base repair ship (ARb)

== Science, engineering, and health care ==
- Accumulative roll bonding of metal sheets
- Angiotensin II receptor blocker, a blood pressure medication
- Anti-roll bar, automotive suspension component to improve stability during cornering, known as a 'sway bar' in US English
- ARB Project, for phylogenetic analysis
- Arbitrary unit or arb unit
- Royal Academies for Science and the Arts of Belgium (French: Académie Royal de Belgique)

== Sports ==
- ARB (martial art), a Russian martial art
- Australian Racing Board for horse racing

== Transportation ==
- Ann Arbor station, Amtrak station in Michigan, station code
- Ann Arbor Municipal Airport (IATA airport code)
- Arbroath railway station, UK (National rail code)
- Arth-Rigi-Bahn, a Swiss mountain railway

== Other uses ==
- ARB, Accounting Research Bulletin, documents on accounting issues revised by the Accounting Principles Board
- ARB (band), a Japanese rock band
- Breton Revolutionary Army (French: Armée Révolutionnaire Bretonne), an illegal organization
