= List of Azerbaijani-language television channels =

This is a list of Azerbaijani language television channels.

== List of channels ==
=== Azerbaijan ===
This is a list of television channels that broadcast in Azerbaijan.

==== State-owned ====
Name	Owner	Established
AzTV	Azerbaijan TV and Radio Programme Society (state-owned)	1956
İdman Azərbaycan	Azerbaijan TV and Radio Programme Society (state-owned)	2009
İTV	Azerbaijan TV and Radio Broadcasting Company	2005
Medeniyyet TV	Azerbaijan TV and Radio Programme Society (state-owned)	2011

==== Nationwide ====
Name	Owner	Established
ANS TV	Vahid Mustafayev	1991
Space TV	Vagif Mustafayev	1997
Lider TV	Media Holding Ltd	2000
ATV	Azerbaijan TV and Radio Broadcasting Company	2000
Xazar TV	Ahmad Gul	2007

==== Regional ====
Name	Owner	Established
Alvin Channel TV	Mr.Alvin Film Studio M.M.C	2020
Alternativ TV	Alternativ-Tele-Radio	2001
Aygün TV	Aslan Nuriyev	1996
Cənub TV	Cənub TV Mahdud Masuliyyatli Society	2006
Kanal-S	Kanal-S Mahdud Masuliyyatli Society	2008
Yevlakh TV	Yevlakh TV Mahdud Masuliyyatli Society	2006
Simurq TV	Simurq M TV Company	1996
Mingachevir TV	Vahid Mammadov	1998
Qütb TV	Qütb Teleradio	1995
Kapaz TV	Kapaz TV company	1993

==== International ====
Name	Owner	Established
CBC Sport	Caucasian Broadcasting Company	2015
EuroAz TV	Stockholm Broadcasting Service	2015

=== Iran ===
- SAHAR TV from Tehran
- Sabalan TV from Ardabil
- West Azerbaijan TV from Urmia

=== United States ===
- GünAz TV from Chicago

=== Iraq ===
- Türkmeneli TV from Kirkuk

== See also ==
- Television in Azerbaijan
