= Uran (rapper) =

Uran İbrahim İbrahimov
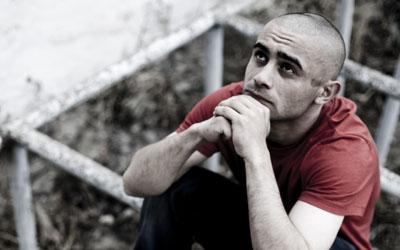

Background information
- Born: Ibrahim Ibrahimov; December 20, 1983 (age 42); Azerbaijan SSR Khachmaz (city)
- Genres: rap hip-hop
- Years active: 2004–present

Uran (full name: Ibrahim Ibrahimov; December 20, 1983 (age 42), Khachmaz (city)) is an Azerbaijani rapper.

Uran has collaborated with artists such as Ceza, Salvo, Detsl, Diana Hajiyeva, Paster, ProMete, Xpert, Payam Turk, F'rhyme and others at various times.

== Life ==
Uran was born on December 20, 1983, in the city of Khachmaz. He graduated from the Heydar Aliyev Military Institute.

=== Creativity ===
He recorded his first rap song on March 9, 1996. His first exposure to rap came from Russian rappers. In later years, he was influenced by Tupac Shakur and Eminem.

His first hip-hop pseudonym was "Mr Ib". In March 2001, he began working as a songwriter for the M. T. Street group. He initially intended to sell song lyrics to rappers who could not write lyrics. In April of that year, the group took 4th place at the underground festival held at the Vatan discotheque with the track "My Lomka Life". At the end of 2001, the M. S. Street group disbanded and Mr. Ib continued his independent activities. On October 19 of that year, he made his first appearance in the assembly hall of Baku Slavic University, at the presentation night of the university's Cheerful and Resourceful Club.

On January 11, 2004, he became the 8th member of the rap group "Caspian Clan". In 2004, the group disbanded and the rapper changed his nickname to "Uran". On October 10, 2004, he participated in the "I'm Here" TV competition on Space TV. He took second place in the TV competition.

On February 2, 2006, Uran participated in the hip-hop show "Urban Culture" organized by the British Council. Later, he took a break from rap for a while due to problems in his personal life.

In April 2007, he participated again in the TV competition "I'm Here 3" and took first place. In August 2007, Uran joined Azerbaijan's first rap label, "Da Streetz".

On April 20, 2008, he became one of the hosts of the radio program "Rap Time". In August of that year, he won first place in the patriotic music competition held by ANS TV with the song "National Thought and Youth".

==== 2010s ====
On May 2, 2010, he performed in Baku with Turkish rapper Ceza. On June 28, 2012, Ceza and Uran shared the same stage for the second time in Baku, at the Heydar Aliyev Sports and Concert Complex.

In 2013, he was the host of the Fanta Youth Festival held at the Tofiq Bahramov Republican Stadium. That same year, he recorded several patriotic tracks.

Uran lived in Germany from August 2014 to February 2016. In 2017, he participated in the reality show "Car Show" broadcast on Azad Azerbaijan TV.

== Personal life ==
He is married and has a daughter.

== Discography ==
Uranus' discography includes 4 studio albums and one mixtape.

Studio albums

Album	year
Hörmətlə Uran	2005
Mənasız şeylər	2009
Açıq mikrofon	2013
ClassX 04•11	2021

Mixtape

Mixtape	year
Qaralama	2011
