= ARB Günəş =

- Country: Azerbaijan
- Broadcast area: Nationwide
- Headquarters: M. F. Akhundov Street, Khachmaz

Programming
- Language: Azerbaijani
- Picture format: 1080i HDTV

Ownership
- Owner: ARB Media Group
- Sister channels: ARB; ARB 24; ARB Canub; ARB Shimal

History
- Launched: 10 April 2015; 11 years ago

Links
- Website: arbgunesh.az

ARB Günəş (Azerbaijani pronunciation: [ɟyˈnæʃ]; lit. 'sun') is an Azerbaijani privately owned children's television channel owned by ARB Media Group, primarily airing animated series and educational content voiced over or produced in the Azerbaijani language. It was officially launched on 10 April 2015 as Günəş TV, being rebranded to its current form in 2016.

ARB Günəş is headquartered in the city of Khachmaz, although it originally broadcast from Quba. It is operated from the same base as ARB Shimal, also headquartered in Khachmaz. ARB Günəş broadcasts throughout Azerbaijan via satellite and cable, although its reach through terrestrial television is solely limited to northern areas of the country.

== History ==
Old logo from 10 April 2015 to 19 September 2016.

Günəş TV was granted a license to broadcast for a period of six years by the National Television and Radio Council in 2011. It officially began transmissions on 1 April 2015 as the first children's television channel in Azerbaijan. It was a part of the Region TV network. Initially, it broadcast for sixteen hours a day, but later expanded its airtime for twenty-four hours on 1 June. Günəş TV's over-the-air broadcasts were limited to the northern regions of Azerbaijan, but can be accessible through satellite as it also has been broadcasting using Azerspace 1 since 10 April 2015. Günəş TV replaced Qutb TV which was headquartered in Quba and began operations back in 1995.

Shortly following the closure of ANS TV, there were reports which alleged that Günəş TV began broadcasting on the nationwide frequency of the defunct station on 5 August 2016. Officials later stated that no station was being broadcast on ANS TV's frequency and that Günəş TV had no ability to broadcast on it as it is a regional station, only being allowed to broadcast in its allocated region. On 19 September 2016, Günəş TV was rebranded as ARB Günəş. All of its sister channels were also rebranded using the ARB branding. The channel participated and represented Azerbaijan at the International Children's Media Conference held by Turkish state broadcaster TRT in Istanbul in December 2016. In September of 2018, the channel opened its own dubbing studio, and since then dozens of cartoons and animated films have been translated into Azerbaijani.

On 4 March 2019, the channel shut down until 9 March 2019 for unknown reasons, while showing a few commercials. They said that they "went to sleep." In September 2021, ARB Günəş signed an agreement with the Korea International Broadcasting Foundation, in which two movies were broadcast on the channel during that time. On 9 July 2024, ARB Günəş was accused of airing unauthorized television series without any proper rights by the Audiovisual Council, which urged the channel to cease transmissions for three hours on 11 July.

== Programming ==
=== Current programming ===
- 44 Cats (44 pişik)
- Action Pack (Qəhrəmanlar komandası)
- Adventures of the Gummi Bears (Qammi ayilari)
- Around the World in Eighty Days (80 gün ərzində yer kürəsi ətrafında səyahət)
- The Barkers (Barboskinlər)
- Be-Be-Bears (Ayı balaları)
- Bernard
- Cathy Quest (Katya və Ef)
- Chip 'n Dale: Rescue Rangers (Çip və Deyl köməyə tələsirlər)
- Cleo & Cuquin (Kleo və Kukin)
- The Creature Cases (Sirli işlər)
- Doug Unplugs (Robot Daq)
- Duda & Dada (Duda və Dada)
- Dug Days (Daqın günləri)
- Gazoon (Qazun)
- Go! Go! Cory Carson (Kori Karson)
- The Hive (Arıların hekayələri)
- Katuri
- Kid-E-Cats (Üç pişik)
- KikoRiki (Yumrular)
- KikoRiki: Pin-Code (Gülməcələr)
- Klump (Ayı balası Rasmusun macəraları)
- Kongsuni and Friends (Konsuni)
- Kung Fu Panda: Legends of Awesomeness (Kunqfu Panda)
- Leo and Tig (Leo və Tiq)
- The Lion Guard (Gözətçi şir)
- Leopold the Cat (Leopold)
- Luntik and His Friends (Aybala)
- Madagascar: A Little Wild (Madaqaskar: Balacaların macəraları)
- The Magic Kitchen (Sehrli mətbəx)
- Maya the Honey Bee (Arı balası Maya)
- Mia and Me (Mia və mən)
- Misho & Robin (Mişo və Robin)
- Molang (Molanq)
- Musti
- My Little Pony: Friendship Is Magic (Mənim balaca ponim)
- Olly the Little White Van (Şən yük maşını Olli)
- Orange Moo-Cow (Narıncı inək)
- Oscar's Oasis (Oskarın vahəsi)
- Panda and Little Mole (Köstəbək və Panda)
- Panda and Krash (Panda və Kroş)
- Pat a Pat Como (Xeyirxah Komo)
- PAW Patrol (Köməyə tələsən itlər)
- PJ Masks (Maskalı qəhrəmanlar)
- Robocar Poli (Robokar Poli)
- Rusty Rivets (Mexanik Rasti)
- Shaun the Sheep (Qoyun Şon)
- S.M.A.S.H! (Cəsurlar düşərgəsi)
- The Smurfs (Şirinlər)
- SpongeBob SquarePants (Süngər Bob)
- Štaflík a Špagetka (Stremyanka və Makaronka)
- Stillwater (Sakit su)
- Sunny Bunnies (Günəş dovşanlar)
- Super Wings (Super qanadlar)
- Tales of the Riverbank (Dağsiçanının macəraları)
- TaleSpin
- Tayo the Little Bus (Tayonun macəraları)
- Timmy Time (Timminin vaxtı)
- Tom and Jerry (Tom və Cerri)
- Tommy the Little Dragon (Əjdaha Toşa)
- Whee Wheels (Rey və komandası)
- Wile E. Coyote and the Road Runner shorts (Koyot)
- Wissper (Vissper)
- Zigby (Ziqbi)

=== Former programming ===
- The 13 Ghosts of Scooby-Doo (Skubi-Dunun 13 kabusu)
- The Adventures of Tintin (Tin-tinin macəraları)
- All Dogs Go to Heaven: The Series (Bütün köpəklər cənnətə düşür)
- Angry Birds Toons (Qəzəbli quşlar)
- Around the World with Willy Fog (Villi Foqla dünya ətrafında səyahət)
- Aunt Owl's Lessons (Bayquş xalanın dərsliyi)
- Avatar: The Last Airbender (Avatar)
- Conan the Adventurer (Konan)
- Denver, the Last Dinosaur (Denver sonuncu dinozavr)
- Digimon Adventure (Digimon)
- The Flintstones (Flistonlar ailəsi)
- Garfield and Friends (Qarfild)
- Heathcliff (Hitklif)
- Liberty's Kids (Azad uşaqlar)
- The Little Mermaid (Su pərisi)
- Masha and the Bear (Maşa və Ayı)
- Miniscule (Miniskule)
- My Friends Tigger & Pooh (Dostlarım Pələng və Vinni)
- Oggy and the Cockroaches (Oqqi və tarakanlar)
- The Penguins of Madagascar (Madaqaskar pinqvinləri)
- Pingu (Pinqu)
- The Pink Panther Show (Çəhrayı pantera)
- Pokémon: Indigo League (Pokemon)
- Sabrina's Secret Life (Sabrinanın gizli həyatı)
- Sailor Moon (Ay savaşçısı)
- Scooby-Doo! Mystery Incorporated (Skubi-Du! Mistik korporasiya)
- Scooby-Doo, Where Are You! (Skubi-Du, sən hardasan?)
- Sherlock Holmes in the 22nd Century (Şerlok Holms)
- The Scooby-Doo Show (Skubi-Dunun şousu)
- ThunderCats (Şimşək pişiklər)
- Well, Just You Wait! (Bir dayan!)
- Willy Fog 2 (Villi Foq 2)
- Winx Club (Vinks klub)
- The Wizard of Oz (Oz ölkəsinin sehrbazı)
- The World of David the Gnome (Cırtdanların qeyri adi macəraları)

== See also ==
- Television in Azerbaijan
