= MTV (disambiguation) =

MTV, formerly Music Television, is an American cable television channel.

MTV or mtv may also refer to:

- MTV Networks, the former name of Paramount Media Networks, a Paramount Skydance division that serves as the parent company of the MTV channel
- MTV Entertainment Group, the parent company of the MTV channels and Studios
- Any of MTV's channels, both domestic and worldwide affiliates

== Music ==
- "MTV", a song by rock band Deep Purple from the Tour Edition of Rapture of the Deep
- MTV, an album by Mo Troper

== People ==
- Melody Trouble Vixen, a female professional wrestler from the Gorgeous Ladies of Wrestling

== Television ==
- MTV Oy, a Finnish media company
- Magyar Televízió, Hungarian public television station
  - MTV1 and mtv, the former names of Hungarian television channel M1, owned by Magyar Televízió
- Metromedia Television, the former owner of television stations owned by Fox Television Stations
- MTV Channel, a Sri Lankan media company
  - TV 1 (Sri Lankan TV channel), a Sri Lankan sports, entertainment, lifestyles, business and news television channel owned by MTV Channel formerly known as MTV
- MTV Azerbaijan, a music-oriented channel
- MTV (Lebanon), or Murr Television, a Lebanese television station
- Mie Television, a television station in Mie Prefecture, Japan
- Multi Technology Vision, a Guyanese television station
- Meaningful Television, a television station in Grenada

== Other uses ==
- AMV video format, also known as MTV
- Methylenedioxypyrovalerone, commonly known as MTV
- Magnesium/Teflon/Viton, a pyrotechnic payload applied in aerial infrared decoy flares
- Medium Tactical Vehicle, a U.S. Army 5-ton capacity truck
- Modular Tactical Vest, an armor vest used by the United States Marine Corps
- Molecular tagging velocimetry, technique of measuring flow velocities
- MTV Ingolstadt, a German sports club
- MTV Ray Tracer graphic file, the output format of the MTV ray tracer program by Mark T. VandeWettering
- Asaro'o language (ISO 639-3 code: mtv)
- Blue Ridge Airport (FAA LID code: MTV)
- Mota Lava Airport (IATA code: MTV)
