= ARB (Azerbaijani TV channel) =

Television station in Azerbaijan

- Country: Azerbaijan
- Broadcast area: Nationwide
- Headquarters: Yasamal, Baku

Programming
- Language: Azerbaijani
- Picture format: 1080i HDTV

Ownership
- Owner: ARB Media Group
- Sister channels: ARB 24; ARB Canub; ARB Günəş; ARB Shimal

History
- Launched: 10 May 2014; 11 years ago
- Former names: Region TV (2014–2016)

Links
- Website: www.arbtv.az

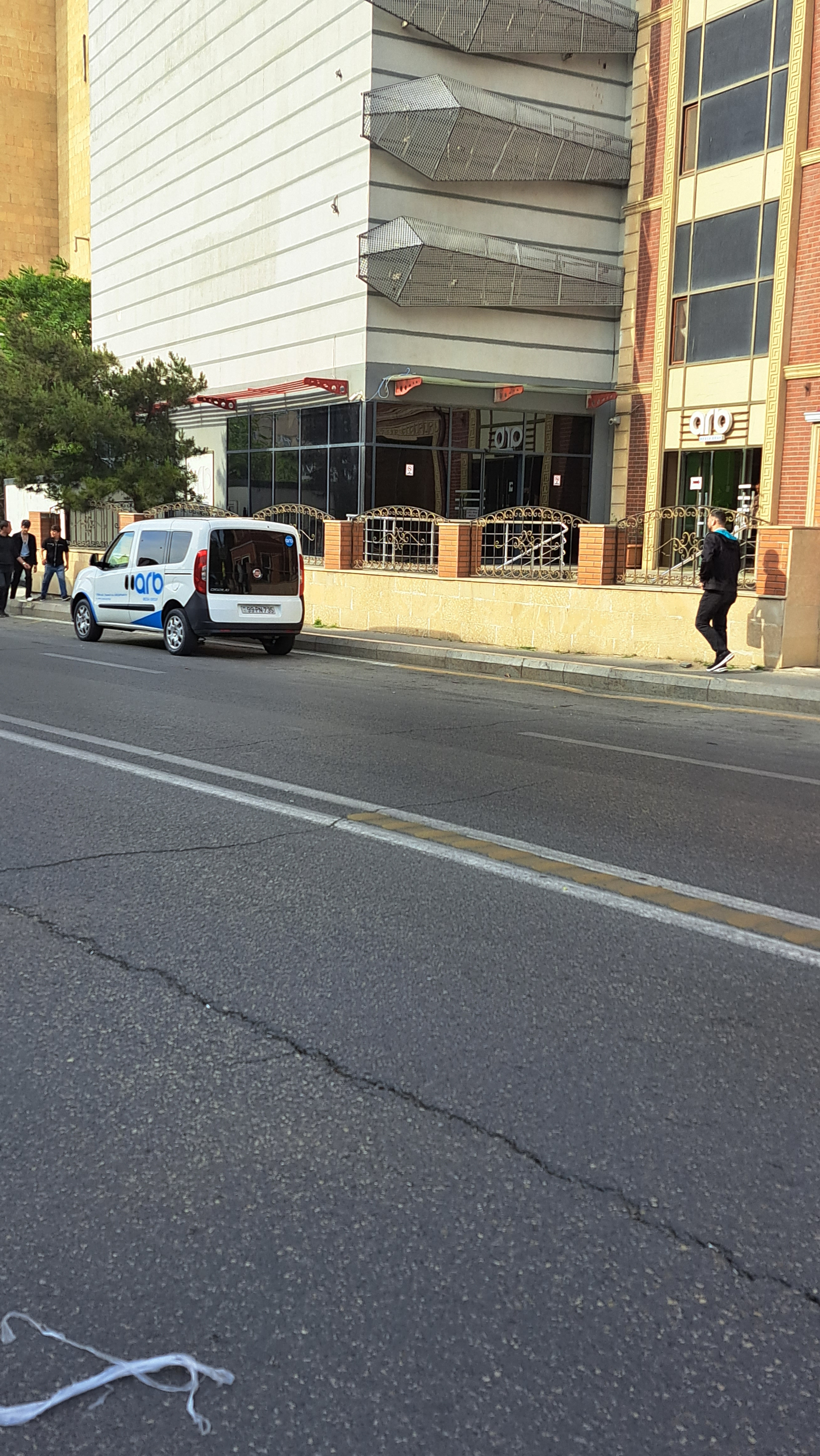
The headquarters of ARB TV in Baku

ARB, abbreviated from Azerbaijani Republic Broadcaster (Azerbaijani: Azərbaycanın Respublika Yayımçısı), is an Azerbaijani privately owned national terrestrial television channel launched on 10 May 2014 as Region TV with the merger of six regional television stations. It was rebranded as ARB in 2016. ARB is headquartered in the Yasamal raion of Baku and owned by the ARB Media Group, which operates eight television channels in total including ARB itself, along with a radio station Kapaz FM.

== History ==
A tender for establishing a new nationwide television channel was announced and organized from 22 January to 22 February 2014. Three companies participated in the tender, namely Baku LLC, Fatiyev Company LLC, and Region TV LLC, of which the latter was announced as the winner. The National Television and Radio Council granted Region TV its license to broadcast on 14 March 2014, set to become the tenth national television channel in Azerbaijan. The channel would be formed with the merger of six regional television stations, namely Kapaz TV of Ganja, RTV of Khachmaz, CTV of Lankaran, EL TV of Yevlakh, Kanal S of Shaki, and TTV of Tovuz.

The channel was set to debut in May 2014. Not only would it broadcast from its own station in Baku throughout the Absheron Peninsula, but also from the studios of the aforementioned regional television stations. It would also broadcast via satellite using Azerspace-1, as well as cable and internet television. Region TV began official broadcasts on 10 May 2014. On 19 September 2016, Region TV was rebranded as ARB. Its associated stations were also renamed; TTV to ARB 24, Kapaz TV to ARB Kapaz, Kanal S to ARB Shaki, EL TV to ARB Aran, CTV to ARB Canub, RTV to ARB Shimal, Alternativ TV to ARB Ulduz, and Günəş TV to ARB Günəş. ARB organized a concert at the Heydar Aliyev Palace as a part of its Söhbət Var program on 31 May 2019. The channel commenced high-definition broadcasts on 5 April 2021.

== Broadcast suspensions ==
During the broadcast of one of its programs, Elgizlə izlə, on 18 April 2020, an expert was seen using inappropriate expressions, which is considered a violation of guidelines regarding the use of such language. ARB was ordered to cease transmissions for six hours on 21 April. Later on 9 May, the channel was found to be violating guidelines again as it explicitly showed the use of tobacco products during the airing of the film Bakıda Küləklər Əsir. Its broadcasts were suspended for an hour on 18 May. On 14 August 2020, ARB was ordered to suspend operations for three hours on 17 August by the National Television and Radio Council as it was airing advertisements exceeding 16 minutes, violating guidelines. Xazar TV was also urged to do so for the same reason.

On 3 May 2022, during the broadcast of the aforementioned Elgizlə izlə, ARB was found to be violating guidelines regarding the promotion of violence and cruelty while the channel was being monitored. ARB was ordered to suspend operations for three hours on 8 May. Accusing ARB, alongside ARB Günəş and Azad Azerbaijan TV, of the unauthorized broadcast of certain television series without proper rights of doing so, the council urged the channels to halt transmissions for three hours on 11 July 2024.

== Programming ==
=== List of programming ===
- Baldız
- Cəsarət yolu (Jordanian series)
- Elgizlə İzlə
- Ezel
- Günə Doğru
- Heç Vaxt Heç Yerdə
- İdarə
- O Üz
- Səhər-səhər
- Səni Axtarıram
- Söhbət Var
- Telekitab
- Uçurum
- Yad Gəlin
