= Davam Ya Tamam =

- Presented by: İdris Cəfərov (2010–2011); Murad Dadaşov (2016–2017)
- Country of origin: Azerbaijan

Production
- Camera setup: Multiple-camera setup
- Running time: 60–70 minutes (without commercials)

Original release
- Network: Space TV
- Release: 2010 – 2011
- Network: Azad Azerbaijan TV
- Release: 31 October 2016 – 6 August 2017

Davam Ya Tamam is the Azerbaijani version of the television gameshow Deal or No Deal. It was produced by Space TV in 2010 and Azad Azerbaijan TV from 2016 to 2017.

The Space TV series consisted of 21 boxes, which ranged from 0.5 AZN (about US$0.3) to 10,000 AZN (about US$5,900).

The Azad Azerbaijan TV series consists of 24 cases, containing prizes from 1 AZN (about US$0.6) to 30,000 AZN (about US$17,800).

== Box/Case Values ==
=== Space TV ===
0.5 AZN
1 AZN
2 AZN
5 AZN
7 AZN
10 AZN
20 AZN
30 AZN
40 AZN
50 AZN
75 AZN

100 AZN
200 AZN
300 AZN
400 AZN
500 AZN
1,000 AZN
2,000 AZN
3,000 AZN
5,000 AZN
10,000 AZN

=== Azad Azerbaijan TV ===
1 AZN
3 AZN
5 AZN
10 AZN
20 AZN
50 AZN
100 AZN
200 AZN
300 AZN
400 AZN
500 AZN
750 AZN

1,000 AZN
1,500 AZN
2,000 AZN
2,500 AZN
3,000 AZN
4,000 AZN
5,000 AZN
7,500 AZN
10,000 AZN
15,000 AZN
20,000 AZN
30,000 AZN
