= ARB Shimal =

ARB Shimal ARB Şimal
- Type: Regional commercial television
- Country: Azerbaijan
- Broadcast area: Northern Azerbaijan
- Headquarters: Mirmustafa Khan Street, Lankaran

Programming
- Language(s): Azerbaijani

Ownership
- Owner: ARB Media Group
- Sister channels: ARB; ARB 24; ARB Canub; ARB Günəş

History
- Launched: 15 November 2007; 17 years ago
- Former names: Regional TV (2007–2016)

ARB Shimal (Azerbaijani: ARB Şimal; Azerbaijani pronunciation: [ʃiˈmɑl]; lit. 'ARB North') is an Azerbaijani privately owned regional terrestrial television channel owned by ARB Media Group, serving northern Azerbaijan. The channel commenced operations on 15 November 2007 as Regional Television or RTV, ARB Shimal is headquartered at M. F. Akhundov Street in the city of Khachmaz, along with its sister ARB Günəş.

== History ==
A competition was held in the year 2006 by the National Television and Radio Council in order to replace Khachmaz TV, which went off air on 25 May 2006. Two companies participated in the competition, which were RTV LLC and Umid-Z LLC. The former won the competition and was granted a six-year license to broadcast on 11 July. RTV began broadcasting on 15 November 2007 on UHF channel 46 in northern Azerbaijan with digital broadcasting equipment, being the first channel in Azerbaijan to do so. An internal PlayBox system has also been established there.

RTV was receivable in the entirety of Guba-Khachmaz Economic Region and the Khizi District. The channel's transmitters were located in Gilgilçay in the Siyazan District, which was said to give the best quality output to the audience. It is also the first television channel in Azerbaijan with a dubbing studio. RTV's news program, Xəbər vaxtı, was awarded the News Program of the Year at Media Key 2010. The channel began broadcasting live online through its website in 2011. In 2014, RTV was one of the six regional television stations in Azerbaijan that formed the Region TV network. The programming of RTV was distributed nationwide through Region TV.

In April 2015, RTV accused Dunya TV of Sumgait of thievery and plagiarism as the latter broadcast a distorted version of RTV's Unudulmayan İfalar. Later in October 2015, the channel participated in the Azerbaijan Family 2015 Film Festival held by the State Committee for Family, Women and Children Affairs with the video clip Rənglər, which won an award next month in the category "Best Social Video". Region TV adopted the ARB branding on 19 September 2016 as it was renamed as ARB Shimal.
