= CBC (Azerbaijani TV channel) =

- Type: Private television
- Country: Azerbaijan
- Broadcast area: Worldwide
- Headquarters: 8 November Avenue, Baku

Programming
- Language: Russian
- Picture format: 1080i HDTV

Ownership
- Owner: SOCAR
- Sister channels: CBC Sport; Xazar TV

History
- Launched: 24 December 2009; 16 years ago
- Former names: ATV International (2009–2013)

Links
- Website: www.cbctv.az

CBC, acronym of Caspian Broadcasting Company, is an Azerbaijani privately owned television channel owned by SOCAR and headquartered at 8 November Avenue in Baku. It is the first international television channel of Azerbaijan, LAUNCHED in 2009 as ATV International, later utilizing its current name in 2013 after it was acquired from Azad Azerbaijan TV. The channel broadcasts in Russian.

== History ==
On 5 March 2009, Azad Azerbaijan TV was granted a license to operate "ATV International", set to broadcast exclusively via satellite to international viewers for up to six years. It began operations on 5 October using the Türksat 3A satellite and equipment imported from Germany and the United States. ATV International was later officially launched on 24 December.

As ATV International was not a commercial channel, there were issues regarding the use of modern facilities. This resulted in Azad Azerbaijan TV later handing ATV International over to the media wing of SOCAR, SOCAR Media Public Union, on 10 April 2013, rebranding the channel as CBC, standing for the Caspian Broadcasting Company. It was set to promote the state's policy while representing the business interests of SOCAR, and also to become the leading television channel in the South Caucasus region.

Journalist Azar Khalilov became the director general of the television channel. Earlier, the Caspian International Broadcasting Company was granted a six-year broadcasting license at a National Television and Radio Council meeting held on 2 April. When ANS Radio was being criticized for allegedly broadcasting Armenian music in May 2014, its authorities argued that CBC was broadcasting in Armenian. Khalilov responded by saying that it is a distinct matter and is only broadcast in Armenian to promote Azerbaijan to the world. The channel aired the Azerbaijan Premier League matches in the Azerbaijani language in August 2015.

In November 2017, Vugar Khalilov succeeded as the director general of CBC. CBC was accused of allegedly promoting anti-Armenian propaganda in January 2024 through one of its documentaries titled Elimination of Yerevan's History. However, on 11 September, a documentary on the lost heritage of Azerbaijanis in the Armenian capital Yerevan titled Hidden Heritage of Yerevan was nominated for a prize at the Around International Film Festival held in Amsterdam.

== Programming ==
During its existence as ATV International, the channel had broadcast news programming in English, Armenian, Persian, and Russian, in addition to native Azerbaijani. It also aired documentaries regarding the heritage, culture, art, and architecture of Azerbaijan, as well as concerts of prominent Azerbaijani artists and local and foreign feature films. After the rebrand, 90% of CBC's programming was set to be in languages spoken in the South Caucasus region, while the rest was to be broadcast in languages spoken in Azerbaijan. The channel continued broadcasting in the four languages as mentioned earlier. Nowadays, CBC broadcasts in Russian for 24 hours a day.
