= Xazar TV =

Xazar
- Type: Commercial television
- Country: Azerbaijan
- Broadcast area: Nationwide
- Headquarters: Khatai, Baku

Programming
- Language: Azerbaijani

Ownership
- Owner: SOCAR
- Sister channels: CBC Sport; CBC TV

History
- Launched: 11 January 2000; 26 years ago
- Former names: STV Xazar (2000–2007)

Links
- Website: www.xezertv.az

Xazar TV (Azerbaijani: Xəzər TV; Azerbaijani pronunciation: [xæzæɾ]; lit. 'Caspian TV') is an Azerbaijani national terrestrial television channel owned by SOCAR through its media wing, SOCAR Media Public Union. It was initially launched as a local feed of the Samanyolu TV on 11 January 2000, being in its current form in 2007, founded by journalist Asaf Hajiyev. Xazar TV is headquartered in the Baku White City in the Khatai raion of Baku. It is a part of the Xazar Media Center.

== History ==
=== STV Xazar (2000–2007) ===
The final logo of STV Xazar used from 2003 to 2007.

Xazar TV was launched on 11 January 2000 as STV Xazar, the Azerbaijani feed of Samanyolu TV. It simulcasted with the main feed broadcast in Turkey. On 7 July 2006, a presentation ceremony of a documentary film on Azerbaijani president Ilham Aliyev made by STV took place in the Ambassador Hotel in Baku, being broadcast on the channel subsequently.

On 28 December 2006, discussions on closing down certain foreign television channels in Azerbaijan took place, with the action itself being launched in January next year, with Kanal D from Turkey being shut down subsequently. Channel One Russia was also eliminated from Azerbaijani airwaves on 11 July 2007. The National Television and Radio Council urged STV Xazar to cease transmissions and sell its frequency.

=== Rebranding as Xazar TV ===
"Xazar TV" was registered on 3 August 2007. STV Xazar was originally supposed to be closed on 10 July but was delayed due to a competition regarding the ownership of the frequency of STV Xazar taking place starting on 17 July. The contestants were Xazar TV, Antenn TV, and Elm TV. Xazar TV won as announced at a meeting of the National Television and Radio Council on 14 September 2007. Xazar TV was later granted a six-year license to broadcast. It was to prioritize educational and cultural programming, as well as programming relating to enlightenment. Xazar TV was also set to distance itself from the ruling government and the opposition, but would not avoid political affairs.

Xazar TV was officially founded on 2 October 2007, beginning transmissions the following day at 20:30 (AZT), half an hour after STV Xazar ceased transmissions. Initially, its programming line was identical to that of its predecessor, STV Xazar. Asaf Hajiyev, the founding director, stated that the channel would be temporarily airing music and films as filler, then it would move on to airing educational and cultural programming, as well as news. It was officially launched on 5 October with the slogan "Ailənizin Xəzəri".

Xazar TV inaugurated its new headquarter building in Baku White City on 30 December 2015, moving there officially in February 2016. The National Television and Radio Council allocated frequencies to Xazar TV and Azad Azerbaijan TV on 9 August 2017 in order for them to commence high-definition broadcasts. Although originally planned to do so in 2015, it officially commenced high-definition broadcasts on 18 September 2017. SOCAR acquired Xazar TV on 5 March 2020, with Murad Dadashov being appointed as the new head of the channel. Xazar TV adopted a new logo in January 2023.

== Broadcast suspensions ==
On 18 May 2020, the broadcasts of Xazar TV were suspended for an hour from 8:00 (AZT) to 9:00. This came a while after the channel broadcast uncensored footage of the use of tobacco products on the movie Qəlb oğrusu, which violated guidelines according to the National Television and Radio Council. Later, on 14 August, the council made another decision to suspend the broadcasts of Xazar TV on 23 August for three hours, this time for airing advertisements for over 16 minutes, another violation of guidelines. ARB was also ordered to be suspended for the same reason. Due to a preventive measure, Xazar TV, alongside its radio sister Araz FM, temporarily suspended operations for eight hours on 9 July 2024.

== Programming ==
The programming line of Xazar TV includes entertainment, news, television series, and others. As of January 2016, Xazar was ranked as the most-watched television channel in Azerbaijan according to AGB/Nielsen. Eight of the ten most-watched television programmes in Azerbaijan at the time were broadcast on Xazar TV. Its news programme is considered to be unique and offers niche reporting. Its presentation of news is also considered to be Turkish-styled. It also had programming imported from Turkey and Japan.
