= Murad Dadaşov =

Azerbaijani actor (born 1978)

- Born: Murad Ali oglu Dadaşov; December 21, 1978 (age 47); Baku, Azerbaijan
- Years active: 2000 - present
- Website: M Group Production

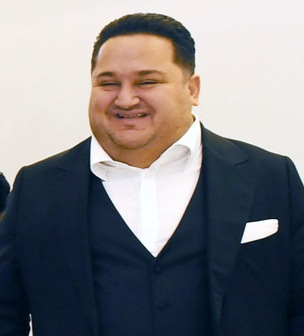
Dadaşov in January 2019

Murad Dadaşov (21 December 1978, Baku, Azerbaijan USSR) is an Azerbaijani actor, producer, TV host, member of Parni iz Baku KVN team and head of M Group Production. In 2014, Dadaşov was awarded the title of Honored Artist of the Azerbaijan Republic. On 27.05.2018, he was titled People's Artist of Azerbaijan.

== Life and career ==
Murad Ali oglu Dadaşov was born on 21 December 1978 in Baku. His father, Ali Mursel oglu Dadaşov, is a transport worker and his mother, Tamilla Abuzer gizi Aliyeva, is a musician and piano teacher. His brother Farid Ali oglu Dadaşov is one of the founders of “KOKON” creative agency. Honored Artist of the Azerbaijan Republic and famous tar player Ahsan Dadaşov is Murad Dadaşov's father's uncle.

During the years 1985-1995 he attended secondary school No. 160 in Baku. He was invited to “The Guys of Baku” Club of the Funny and Inventive that played a huge role in the development of the Azerbaijani youth at the dawn of the 20th century. In December 1993 he stepped on the big, professional stage. In 2000 “The Guys of Baku” team won “Champions of the 20th Century” title, and was part of the winning team.

In 1996-2000 Dadaşov studied at the faculty of Social Sciences and Psychology at Baku State University. He is a psychologist. While studying at the university (1999–2002) he also served as deputy director at the Center for Independent Sociological Studies “Prognoz” (Russian for "Forecast").

Murad Dadaşov's first television work started in the mid-1990s at the Azerbaijan Television and Radio Broadcasting Closed Joint Stock Company. Together with another member of “The Guys of Baku” Club of the Funny and Inventive Jabir Imanov, he produced a project under the title “Bir cənub şəhərində” (Once upon a time in a southern city).

In the late 1990s he was the host of "Road Master", a project on Space TV. Since January 2002 to October of the same year he acted as General Producer at the TV station ANS TV. At the same time, he hosted the daily show “Yeriniz Məlum” (Wish you could join us) broadcast on this channel.

On February 7, 2003, Dadaşov laid the foundation of production company MGP (M Group Production). There, he filled the post of General Manager until 2008. First project of the company was “Mərc Şou” (“Make a Bet Show") that was broadcast on Lider TV in 2003. In 2005 the same channel broadcast reality show “Maşın” (The Car). Dadaşov was the author and host of both projects. In 2008-2010 he has been appointed to position of General Producer at Lider Media Holdinq. He has been the President of MGP since 2010.

Over the recent years Dadaşov acted as jury and professional expert in many projects that are broadcast nowadays. He was among the juries in “Yeni ulduz” (New star) music competition on Azad Azerbaijan TV from 2004 to 2011, “Пять звезд. Интервидение 2008” (Five Stars. Intervision-2008) song contest held in Sochi in 2008, “Böyük Səhnə” (Big Stage) singing show in 2014, and “Özünü Tanıt” (Got talent), broadcast on ATV in 2015. From 2016 to 2017, he hosted the revival of "Davam ya tamam", the Azerbaijani version of Deal or No Deal, also on ATV.

Under President Ilham Aliyev's decree from December 18, 2014, Dadaşov was awarded the title of the Honored Artist of the Azerbaijan Republic “For his merits to the development of Azerbaijani culture”.

In 2001 he married Ayten Elkhan gizi Dadaşova, an orientalist by profession. He has 3 sons Kamal Murad oglu Dadaşov (b.20.11.2001), Ali Murad oglu Dadaşov (b.14.03.2005) and Ziya Murad oglu Dadaşov (b.03.12.2010).

== Films ==
- National bomb (Milli bomba, 2004)
- Hard way (Çətin yol, 2006)
- Once upon a time in Caucasus (Bir dəfə Qafqazda, 2007)
- Honesty monies (Halal pullar, 2008)
- Don't worry, i am with you (Qorxma, mən səninləyəm! 1919, 2014)
- Festive evening (Bayram axşamı, 2017)
