= Ilkin Hasani =

Azerbaijani actor, television presenter and film producer

Ilkin Hasani İlkin Həsəni
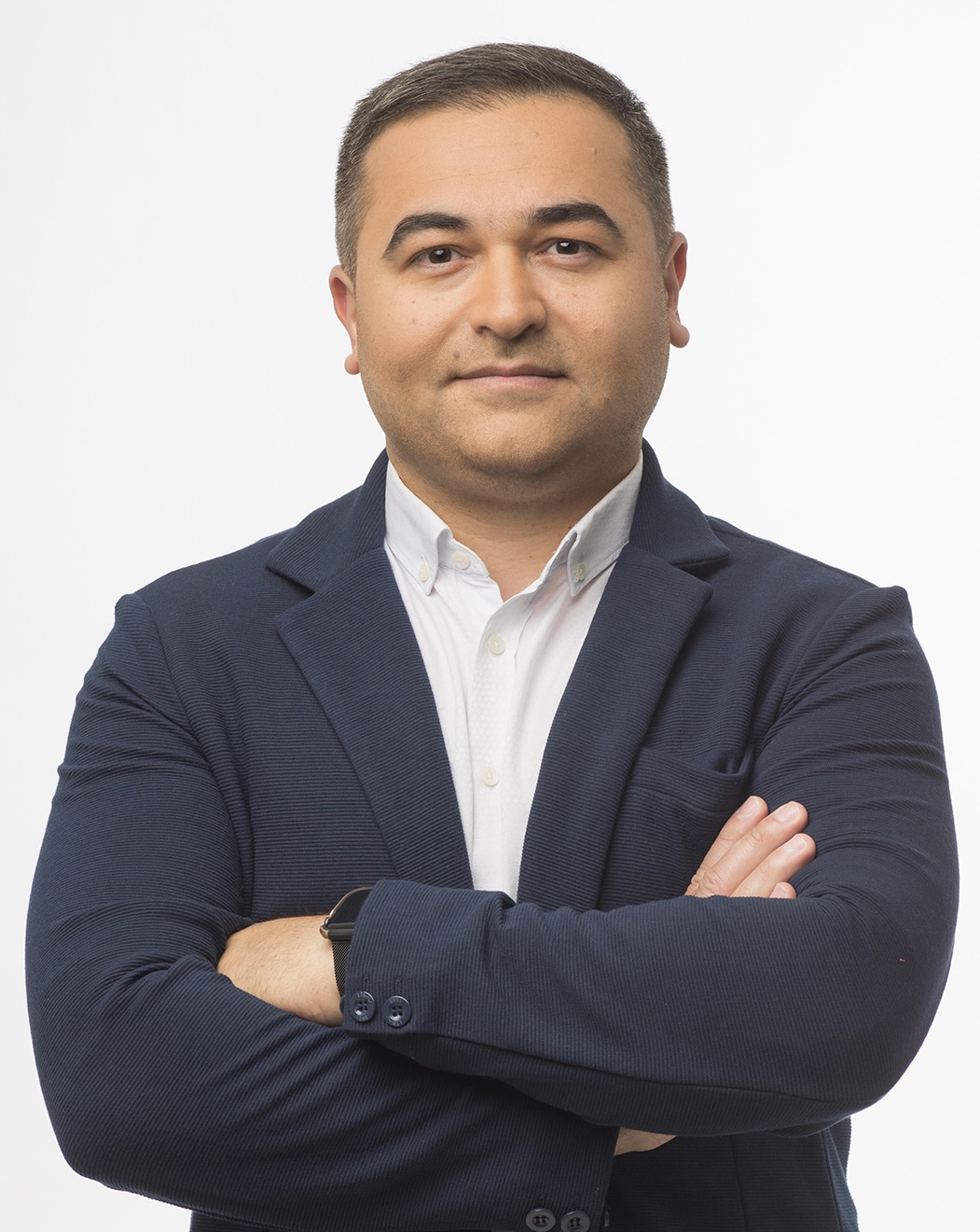
- Born: 21 October 1983 (age 42); Sabirabad, Azerbaijan SSR
- Education: Azerbaijan State University of Culture and Arts
- Occupations: Actor, television presenter, film producer
- Years active: 2001–present

Ilkin Hasani (Azerbaijani: İlkin Həsəni, born 21 October 1983) is an Azerbaijani actor, television presenter and film producer.

== Biography ==
Ilkin Hasani was born on October 21, 1983 in Sabirabad. He studied in Russian language at schools No. 35 and No. 164 of Nasimi district, and the last 3 classes in Azerbaijani language in Railway Lyceum No. 2. In 2000 he entered the faculty of cinematography of the Azerbaijan State University of Culture and Arts. In 2000–2001 he started his professional photography. In 2001 he won the 3rd place in the photo competition held by the Ministry of Youth and Tourism, and in November of the same year, he won the 1st place in the photo competition held in Strasbourg, France. In 2001 he continued his education at the faculty of television directing. In the same year he began working for Azad Azerbaijan TV. He started working as a news presenter on 106 FM radio. A year later, he became a television presenter.

Ilkin Hasani has been the host of programs such as "Virtual Time" (106 Fm), "Very interesting" (Azerbaijani: Çox maraqlı), "ATV Magazine", "New star" (Azerbaijani: Yeni Ulduz), "I have a word" (Azerbaijani: Sözüm var), "Our morning" (Azerbaijani: Bizim səhər), "People's star" (Azerbaijani: Xalq ulduzu), and "AutoTime". He is the author of the project and play the character "Shemi" (Azerbaijani: Şəmi) of "Bozbash Pictures".

Ilkin Hasani founded "Ilk Media" in 2013, of which he is currently the director. At the first European Games in Baku in 2015, he was elected a star ambassador for cycling sport. In 2006–2007, he served in the Azerbaijani Border Troops and completed his service with the rank of sergeant major.

== Projects ==
As actor

- "Moskva-Bakı" qatarı (film, 2005)
- Bozbash Pictures (2011–2018)
- Ay Brilliant (film, 2015)
- Axırıncı yol (film, 2016)
- Stalinin başı (film, 2016)
- Palata 106 (2016–2017)
- Bir Xalanın Sirri (film 2018)
- Bombaltı 1 (film, 2019)

As chief producer

- Bozbash Pictures (2011–2018)
- Ay Brilliant (film, 2015)
- Axırıncı yol (film, 2016)
- Stalinin başı (film, 2016)
- Palata 106 (2016–2017)
- Bir Xalanın Sirri (film, 2018)
- Bombaltı (film, 2019)
- Buğlama (2018–)
