= MTV Azerbaijan =

- Type: Satellite and cable
- Country: Azerbaijan
- Broadcast area: Nationwide
- Headquarters: Tbilisi Avenue, Baku

Programming
- Language(s): Azerbaijani

History
- Launched: 11 May 2012; 13 years ago

Links
- Website: muztv.az

MTV Azerbaijan, 'MTV' being the acronym of Muz TV, is an Azerbaijani satellite and cable music-oriented television channel. It initially launched as an internet-based television channel on 11 May 2012 and later began broadcasting via satellite in 2017. Despite its name, the channel has no connection with the American cable television channel MTV, and instead was launched as the local feed of Russian music channel Muz-TV. MTV Azerbaijan is headquartered at Tbilisi Avenue in Baku. It is the first music-oriented television channel in Azerbaijan.

== History ==
Muz TV Azerbaijan began broadcasts as an internet television channel on 11 May 2012 through its website, aiming to promote Azerbaijani music. Muz TV Azerbaijan commenced worldwide satellite transmissions on 6 October 2017 through Azerspace-1 after signing an agreement with Azercosmos. Its license to broadcast via satellite was granted on 20 October by the National Television and Radio Council. A concert was organized at the Azerbaijan State Academic Philharmonic Hall on 12 February 2018 on the occasion of the beginning of MTV Azerbaijan's satellite broadcast.

Singer Rahim Rahimli joined MTV Azerbaijan as its director in late June 2018. It was reported on 4 January 2020 that Rahim Rahimli was removed from his position as the director of MTV Azerbaijan. This was initially denied by the network on 5 January, but this was later clarified a few days later. The Audiovisual Council sent a warning to MTV Azerbaijan on 30 June 2022 after the channel was found to violate guidelines five days prior. As it was allegedly promoting violence on 3 October 2022 through its program Ümid ilə gəl according to the council, MTV Azerbaijan was warned again alongside Azad Azerbaijan TV on 5 October. It was warned once again for guidelines violation in February 2023.

On 20 February 2024, MTV Azerbaijan broadcast content which was considered a violation of guidelines, causing the audiovisual council to suspend the channel's broadcasts for eight hours on 27 February. On 25 July 2024, Fariz Aliyev took the position of the deputy executive director of MTV Azerbaijan. He later resigned from his position. Elsever Dunyamaliyev, who previously served as the deputy chairman of AzTV, succeeded Aliyev as the new executive director of MTV Azerbaijan on 9 September 2024.

== Programming ==
Originally, the channel solely broadcast music programming. Later in 2020, its lineup began to include non-music entertainment programming. MTV Azerbaijan is a mixed entertainment channel, offering both music and non-music programming.

=== List of programming ===
- Düzünə Qalsa
- Tarixin Bir Günü
- Toya Gəlmişik
- Ümid ilə gəl
- Sənin Səhərin
