= CBC Sport =

- Type: Private television
- Country: Azerbaijan
- Broadcast area: Nationwide
- Headquarters: Babak Avenue, Baku

Programming
- Language(s): Azerbaijani
- Picture format: 1080i HDTV

Ownership
- Owner: SOCAR
- Sister channels: CBC TV; Xazar TV

History
- Launched: 9 August 2015; 9 years ago (online); 1 November 2015; 9 years ago (linear)

Links
- Website: www.cbcsport.az

CBC Sport is an Azerbaijani sports-oriented television channel owned and operated by SOCAR through its media wing, SOCAR Public Media Union. Originally launched as a web channel on 9 August 2015, it was later launched as a linear television channel. It is a sister channel of CBC, competing with state-owned Idman Azerbaijan TV. CBC Sport is headquartered at Babak Avenue in Baku.

== History ==
Plans to launch a dedicated sports channel came after CBC won the rights to broadcast the Azerbaijan Premier League in early August 2015. Although CBC primarily broadcasts in Russian alongside some other foreign languages, the games were broadcast with Azerbaijani commentary before the launch of CBC Sport. It was launched exclusively on the internet on 9 August 2015. Later on 8 September, the National Television and Radio Council granted CBC Sport a license through a non-competition special consent, allowing the channel to broadcast nationally over the air for six years.

CBC Sport commenced experimental broadcasts on 1 October 2015 in the high-definition format, being the first television channel in Azerbaijan to do so. The test broadcasts were only receiveable in certain areas. CBC Sports began official broadcasts as a linear channel on 1 November, becoming the second sports-oriented television channel in Azerbaijan after Idman TV. It later began broadcasting using the Azerspace-1 satellite after an agreement was signed between the channel and Azercosmos. Its license to broadcast was later upgraded to being indefinite by the council on 21 December 2015.
