= ARB Canub =

ARB Canub ARB Cənub
- Type: Regional commercial television
- Country: Azerbaijan
- Broadcast area: Southern Azerbaijan
- Headquarters: Mirmustafa Khan Street, Lankaran

Programming
- Language(s): Azerbaijani

Ownership
- Owner: ARB Media Group
- Sister channels: ARB; ARB 24; ARB Günəş; ARB Shimal

History
- Launched: 31 December 2007; 17 years ago
- Former names: Cənub TV (2007–2016)

ARB Canub (Azerbaijani: ARB Cənub; Azerbaijani pronunciation: [d͡ʒæˈnub]; lit. 'ARB South') is an Azerbaijani privately owned regional terrestrial television channel owned by ARB Media Group, serving southern Azerbaijan. It began operations on 31 December 2007 as Canub Television, being rebranded into its current form in 2016. ARB Canub is headquartered at Mirmustafa Khan Street in the city of Lankaran.

== History ==
A competition was announced on 6 June 2007 by the National Television and Radio Council and subsequently held in order to replace Lankaran TV, which ceased operations on 18 June due to reasons relating to state financing of the television channel, which is illegal according to Azerbaijani law. In the whole competition, there was only one applicant, "Canub TV" or "CTV". Therefore, the frequency was to be transferred to Canub TV after the competition ended on 20 August.

Its license to broadcast for six years was granted by the National Television and Radio Council to CTV in September 2007. However, official transmissions would begin on 31 December 2007, broadcasting from 9:00 (AZT) in the morning to 2:00 (AZT) at midnight. In its early years, the channel was receivable in all of the Lankaran-Astara Economic Region, as well as the Bilasuvar District. It later expanded to cover 22 regions in the south.

The channel inaugurated its new headquarters building on 8 October 2008. It produced the film Təlatüm in 2011 through its film production studio CTV Cinema, which was broadcast on the channel. In 2014, Canub TV was one of the six regional television stations in Azerbaijan that formed the Region TV network. The programming of CTV was distributed nationwide through Region TV. It competed with ANS TV in the southern region. Canub TV adopted the ARB branding on 19 September 2016 as it was renamed as ARB Canub.

== Programming ==
The following is a list of programming broadcast on the channel when it was known as CTV.

- Absurd şou
- Bərəkət
- Bilirsinizmi?
- Bir cənub səhəri
- Biznez qlobal
- Hə-Yox
- İzi itməyən cinayətlər
- Min bir nəğmə
- Seyf
- Telestadion
- Ürək sözü
- Üz-üzə
- Xəbər Xətti
