= ARB 24 =

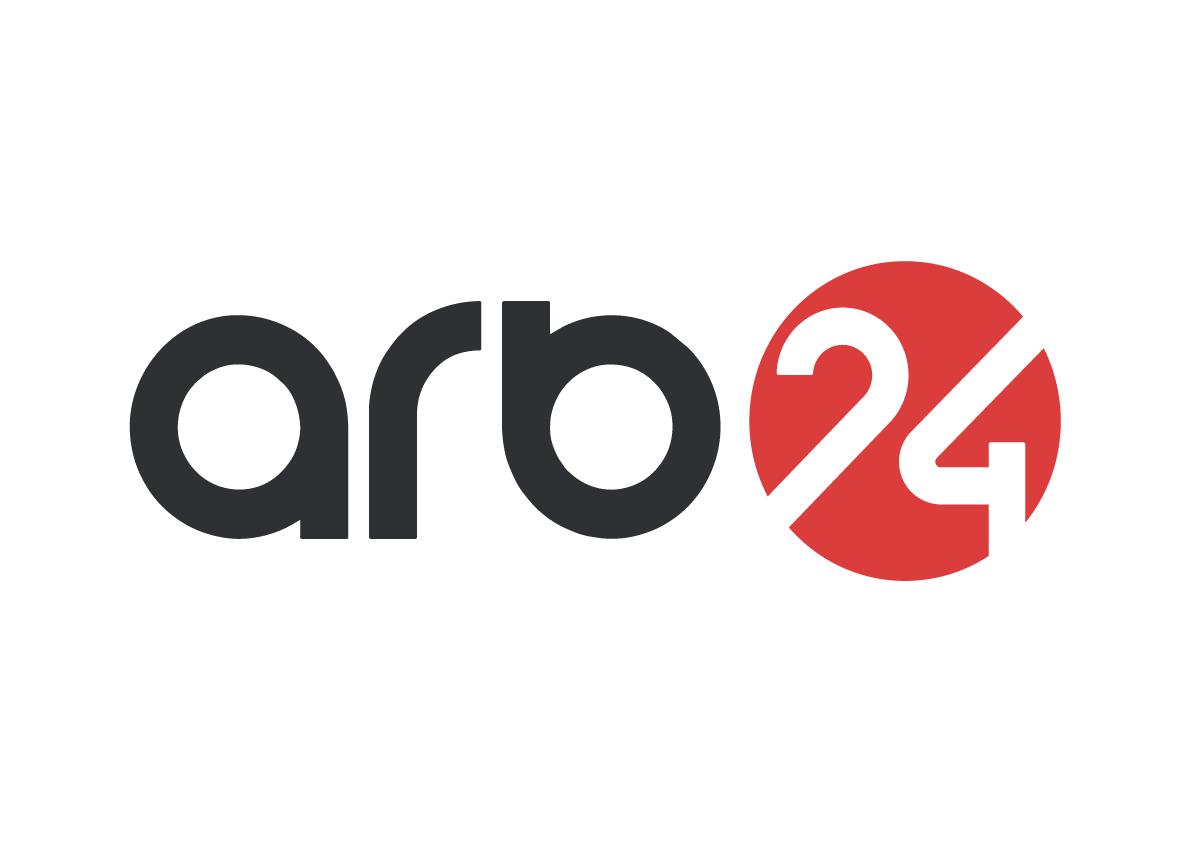

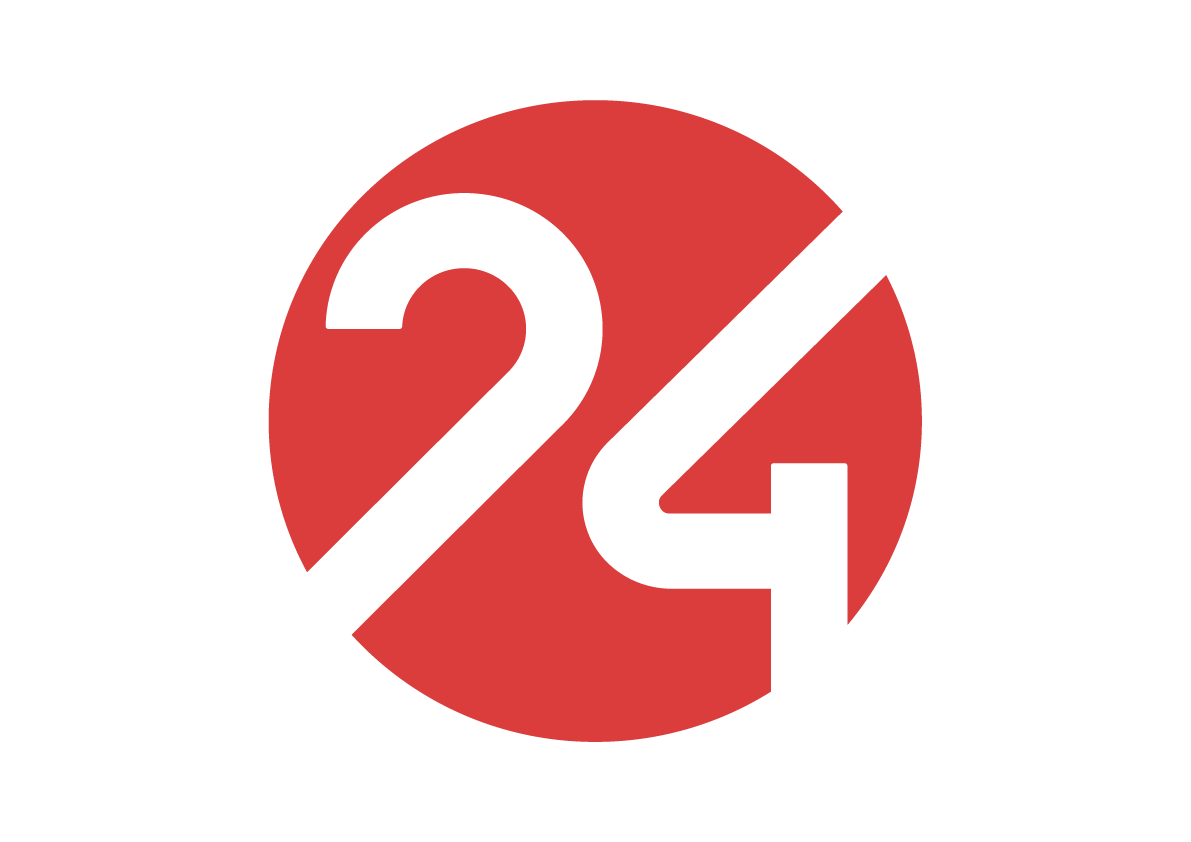
- Type: News channel
- Country: Azerbaijan
- Broadcast area: Nationwide
- Headquarters: Yasamal, Baku

Programming
- Language: Azerbaijani
- Picture format: 1080i HDTV

Ownership
- Owner: ARB Media Group
- Key people: Radik Ismailov
- Sister channels: ARB; ARB Canub; ARB Günəş; ARB Shimal

History
- Launched: 1 June 2010 (regional); 27 November 2018 (nationwide)
- Former names: Türkel TV (2010–2016)

Links
- Website: arb24.az

ARB 24 is an Azerbaijani privately owned national news-oriented television channel owned by ARB Media Group. It was originally launched as Türkel TV on 1 June 2010, a regional channel based in Tovuz, being rebranded in its current form in 2016. ARB 24 is headquartered in the Yasamal raion of Baku. Radik Ismailov is the current executive director of ARB 24.

== History ==
The logo of the channel when it was known as Türkel TV.

Türkel TV was launched on 1 June 2010, replacing Simurq M TV after it was acquired from its original owner, Musa Suleymanov. Simurg M TV was launched in 1995 serving Tovuz, which also broadcast to audiences in Ganja and Qazax after receiving permission to do so in 2005, as well as in remote villages alongside the border with Armenia.

Originally operated as a television station devoted to programming regarding culture, Türkel TV, or TTV, was converted into a news-oriented channel in early 2012. At the time, the broadcasts of TTV only reached seventeen districts in northwestern Azerbaijan. It also broadcast in some parts of neighboring Georgia. Its signals were later expanded to cover thirty districts in total. TTV was one of the six regional television stations in Azerbaijan to form Region TV on 10 May 2014. On 10 April 2015, the National Television and Radio Council granted TTV a six-year license to broadcast via satellite, allowing the station to commence satellite broadcasts on the same day. TTV was rebranded as ARB 24 on 19 September 2016.

A competition was held by the National Television and Radio Council on 16 November 2017 seeking the launch of a new nationwide news-oriented television channel. Three companies, Baku Art Lab LLC, Media Master LLC, and Türkel TV LLC were the participants of the competition, which ended on 16 December. Eventually, Türkel TV LLC, which operates ARB 24, was announced as the winner, subsequently being given a perpetual license to broadcast terrestrially as a national news television channel. The channel would continue operating as ARB 24 and its administrative headquarters would be in Baku.

In preparation for the launch of ARB 24 as a full-fledged specialized national news channel, the channel temporarily went off air on 24 September 2018. It later resumed broadcasts on 8 October with all equipment being moved to Baku from Tovuz. ARB 24 was officially launched as a national news television channel on 27 November 2018 in the DVB-T standard in full high-definition format through the Baku TV Tower. Later on 27 December 2018, the National Television and Radio Council decided to terminate the license given to Türkel TV LLC for regional broadcasting and formalize it utilizing the "ARB 24" name.

In February 2020, ARB 24 signed a cooperation agreement with German public broadcaster Deutsche Welle, allowing the channel to broadcast DW's Tomorrow Today, Global3000, and Reporter. The channel later signed a cooperation agreement with the Baku State University on 29 April 2022, with the "ARB 24 NewsLab" being subsequently organized. ARB 24 signed a memorandum of cooperation with Kyrgyz television channel Ala-Too 24 at the Shusha Global Media Forum on 22 July 2023.

== Programming ==
ARB 24 broadcasts news and current affairs programming all day. Its notable programs include İşgüzar səhər, İş vaxtı, Nə baş verir, Gündəm, Oyundankənar, Peşəkar müsahibə, Həftəyə baxış, Gələcəyin peşəsi, and Kreativ sənaye, in addition to its main news program Xəbərlər.

In addition, in cooperation with distribution companies, Bloomberg's "The Rubenstein Show: Peer to Peer" project and various documentaries on global topics are presented.
