= Space TV =

- Type: Commercial television
- Country: Azerbaijan
- Broadcast area: Nationwide
- Headquarters: Hüseyn Cavid Avenue, Baku

Programming
- Language: Azerbaijani
- Picture format: 1080i HDTV

Ownership
- Owner: Space Independent Television and Radio Company

History
- Launched: 12 October 1997; 28 years ago

Space TV is an Azerbaijani national terrestrial television channel launched on 12 October 1997. It is headquartered at Hüseyn Cavid Avenue in Baku. Space TV is sister to Space 104 FM, both of which are owned by the Space Independent Television and Radio Company.

== History ==
Space TV commenced official broadcasts on 12 October 1997. Besides native Azerbaijani, Space TV broadcast some of its programming in the Russian language until 31 December 2007. Space TV was advised by Azercosmos in October 2016 to be more active in preparing for the digital switchover in December as it was found that its equipments and preparations were not ready for it during that time.

In April 2019, Space TV was fined 5,000–8,000 manats due to obscene vocabulary being used on-air during one of its programs, Hər Səhər, as found while the channel was being monitored. Space TV began broadcasting for 24 hours on 4 January 2021, moving from 18-hour daily broadcasts. On 13 January, Space TV inaugurated high-definition broadcasts, after being authorized to do so two days prior. High-definition broadcasts also began through the Azerspace-1 satellite on 28 January 2022.

Mushfiq Hatamov succeeded as the new manager of Space TV on 20 May 2021. The channel adopted a new logo after nine years on 29 September 2021. On 16 November 2022, Space TV was ordered by the Audiovisual Council to suspend operations for three hours on 17 November after it was found to be violating guidelines regarding violence and cruelty being shown on television. Hatamov left his position on 7 February 2023 and was replaced with Vado Karovin.

== Programming ==
The programming line of Space TV consists of music and entertainment programming, which as of January 2024 accounted up to 20.4% of the channel's lineup. Socially-oriented programming made up 14.10% and advertising and social presentations made up 17.4% of the lineup, respectively. The remaining 51.9% consisted of other variety of programs. The channel has mainly been airing comedy programming since February 2023.

=== List of programming ===
- Banu
- Bizim Həkim
- Davam Ya Tamam
- Hər Gün
- Hər Həftə
- Hər Səhər
- İşgüzar Xəbərlər
- Olduğu Kimi
- Onda Başladıq
- Popumuz Var
- Siqnal
- Uşaq Aləmi
- Xanımlar Saatı
- Zəhmətkeş Ulduzlar
