= Kapaz TV =

Kapaz TV Kəpəz TV
- Type: Regional commercial television
- Country: Azerbaijan
- Broadcast area: Northwestern Azerbaijan
- Headquarters: Nizami, Ganja

Programming
- Language(s): Azerbaijani

Ownership
- Owner: Kapaz Independent Teleradio Company

History
- Launched: 6 May 1994; 30 years ago
- Former names: ARB Kapaz (2016–2019)

Links
- Website: kepeztv.az

Kapaz TV (Azerbaijani: Kəpəz TV; Azerbaijani pronunciation: [cæˈpæs]; in reference to Mount Kapaz) is an Azerbaijani privately owned regional terrestrial television channel serving northwestern Azerbaijan. It began operations on 6 May 1994 as the first privately owned regional television channel in Azerbaijan. Kapaz TV is headquartered Nizami raion of Ganja, and serves the economic regions of Ganja-Dashkasan and Gazakh-Tovuz. It is owned by the Kapaz Independent Teleradio Company.

== History ==
Kapaz TV was founded on 14 July 1993 in the city of Ganja, with broadcasts commencing on 6 May 1994. In February 2007, Kapaz TV began dubbing content into Azerbaijani, with its dubbing studio being established in Baku. As of May 2007, the dubbing of about 80 feature and documentary films, as well as cartoons, has been carried out. This was done in order to comply with the requirement of all local programming to be in Azerbaijani which went effective the following year.

There were allegations that the ownership of Kapaz TV was forcibly taken from Rufat Asgarov through pressure from government representatives on 4 June 2008. This was denied both by the new owner Fuad Jabbarov, who stated that Asgarov sold the channel through a voluntary purchase agreement, and by Asgarov's father. The website of the channel was launched on 4 June 2009. It shifted its headquarters to a new building in September 2012, which is the largest television building in northwestern Azerbaijan. The radio sister of the channel, Kapaz FM, began operations on 5 February 2013. Kapaz TV launched its app in November 2013 for Android devices.

Kapaz TV was one of the six regional television stations in Azerbaijan that formed the Region TV network in May 2014. Its broadcast center was in the same base as Kapaz TV. The channel also migrated to 24-hour broadcasts from 18-hour broadcasts during the same time. It adopted the ARB branding on 19 September 2016 as it was renamed as ARB Kapaz. Its name was reverted to Kapaz TV on 4 March 2019 after its departure from ARB Media Group. On 11 October 2022, Kapaz TV was granted a license to broadcast on satellite television by the Audiovisual Council.

== Programming ==
Kapaz TV has a diverse range of programming. The programs included in its daily schedule are Adabi Abadiyyat, Bu Sabah, Dostlar, Ganjam, Hadisa, Kapaz Khabar, Kichik Ikhtirachilar, Man Anayam, Maktabdan Qalanlar, Sabahin Asgari, Silinmayan Izlar, Ughur Yolu, and Vatan Namina. Over the years, the channel had produced over a hundred historical feature documentary films, for which it won multiple awards.
