= Tommy the Little Dragon =

Russian children's TV series

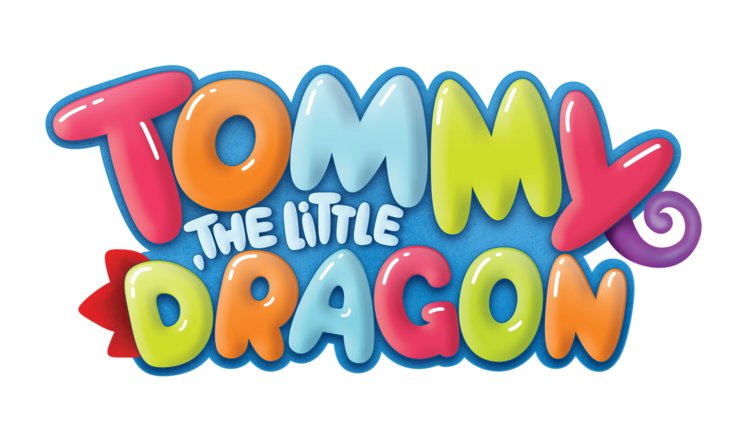
- Genre: Comedy, educational
- Directed by: Marina Moshkova; Alexandra Kovtun; Marina Sharova; Tatyana Moshkova; Andrey Zhidkov; Anna Borisova; Andrey Bakhurin; Tatyana Poliektova; Ekaterina Shturmak; Alexandra Averyanova
- Voices of: Andrey Levin, Julia Rudina
- Composer: Alexander Para
- Country of origin: Russia
- Original language: Russian
- No. of seasons: 3
- No. of episodes: 68

Production
- Producers: Oleg Roy; Lyudmila Vavilova; Sergey Polyakov; Daria Davydova
- Running time: 5 minutes 30 seconds (shorts)
- Production company: ToyRoy

Original release
- Network: Carousel
- Release: 2017

Tommy the Little Dragon (Russian: Дракоша Тоша) is a Russian educational animated series for preschool children, created in 2017 by ToyRoy, and is the only animated series created on private capital in Russia.

The first two series, each 26 episodes, were released in 2017 and 2018. In the fall of 2020, the third season was scheduled to be released, with 16 episodes. Also in the same year, the animated series was released on Amazon Prime in the United States and Canada and will be released on other streaming platforms in Taiwan, India, China and Pakistan.

The script for the third season of the series was developed by the writer for the cartoons Teenage Mutant Ninja Turtles and Disney's Adventures of the Gummi Bears, Michael Maurer.

== Description ==
Tommy the Little Dragon is an animated TV series for children from 2 to 4 years old. Each There is no offense or antagonists in the series' world, so parents can safely leave their children in front of the TV and be sure that Tommy the Little Dragon will teach only good things. The series aims to convey a message about the importance of the family values, love for our close people, caring about the young ones and helping the grown-ups and seniors. Each episode is based on a common situation, which children know quite well, so that they can review this situation from a different point of view and find a solution in an easy and playful way.

== Plot ==
The main purpose of the series is to persuade younger children to practise simple actions, like tying shoelaces or eating soup. Tommy is a toy dragon who came to life (as seen in the opening), who teaches Andy and Mandy (two pandas) important lessons by transporting them into different places (i.e., Stubbornstan or Bulliville), in which the people living there do the same thing that Andy or Mandy have done. Andy and Mandy are blue and red respectively, which resembles their negative emotions, because when Andy is upset, he often sobs (which blue indicates) and when Mandy is upset, she often complains (which red indicates). Tommy is not allowed to come to life in front of Andy and Mandy's parents, and neither can Dori (Tommy's robot and female counterpart), as it is the biggest secret in the world of toys.

== Crew ==
- Director: Andrei Bakhurin
- Screenwriter: Inga Kirkiz
- Artists: Anna Umanets, Elena Bryutten-Firsova
- Animators: K. Muravei, M. Kolpakova, Kirill Vorontsov, E. Sedova, Yu. Kutyumov, E. Demenkova, Anelya Gusha, M. Chugunova, Vadim Merkulov, M. Isakova, V. Vasyukhichev, Alla Yaroshenko, A. Oginskaya, D Kravchenko, G. Demin, T. Tishenina, Yulia Lis, A. Ivanova, M. Belyaev, Oleg Sheplyakov
- Producers: L. Vavilova, O. Roy, Samson Polyakov, D. Davydova
- Composer: Alexander Para
- Sound engineers: Igor Yakovel, Denis Dushin
- Roles voiced: Andrey Levin, Julia Rudina
- English roles voiced by Lorena Robinson, Roger King and George Robinson
- Produced by George Robinson. Robinson Creative for Toy Roy

== Episodes ==
=== Season 1 - 2017 ===
1. The Case of the Missing Monster
2. My New Pacifier
3. The Angry Trains
4. At the Pond
5. Pirates
6. Meet Bustler and Patience
7. The Land of Wasteland
8. Good Mood
9. A Forbidden Word
10. A Endless Birthday
11. A Bedtime Story
12. Giant Mandy
13. Sumo Challenge
14. Roll the Dice!
15. For Everlasting Candies
16. Marquise Caprice
17. Imagine That!
18. Draw the World
19. Scribbles the Cat
20. I Can Do It!
21. Empathy
22. Ice Cream, Pacifiers and Teddy Bears
23. Nature is Beautiful
24. Sand Castles
25. The 4 Seasons
26. Silly Monitors

== Reception ==
Tommy the Little Dragon occupies the top lines of the ratings of Russian online cinemas ivi.ru, Okko, Megogo, Wink, and Tvzavr. The animated series is also popular on the main children's TV channels Carousel, Mama, MULT, and, in addition, To date, the total number of views per month on YouTube is more than 20 million.

== Awards and festivals ==
Awards

- 2018 – Open Russian Animated Film Festival in Suzdal: the animated series "Shkola zaboty (Drakosha Tosha)".

Festivals

- 2018 – SUPERTOON – Brač, Croatia;
- 2018 – Constantine's Golden Coin – Niš, Serbia;
- 2018 – San Diego International Kids' Film Festival – San Diego, United States;
- 2018 – FAN CHILE, Festival Audiovisual para Niños – Santiago, Chile;
- 2018 – Biennial of Animation Bratislava – Bratislava, Slovakia;
- 2018 – Cinekid – Amsterdam, Netherlands;
- 2019 – Tehran International Animation Festival – Tehran, Iran;
- 2019 – Golden Kuker – Sofia, Bulgaria.

== Links ==
- "Shkola zaboty (Drakosha Tosha)" on Animator.ru
- Tommy the Little Dragon at IMDb
