= EL TV =

- Type: Regional commercial television
- Country: Azerbaijan
- Broadcast area: Northwestern Azerbaijan
- Headquarters: Heydar Aliyev Avenue, Yevlakh

Programming
- Language: Azerbaijani

Ownership
- Owner: Yevlakh TV LLC

History
- Launched: 17 July 2009; 17 years ago
- Former names: ARB Aran (2016–2020)

EL TV is an Azerbaijani privately owned regional terrestrial television channel serving the Central Aran Economic Region and launched on 17 July 2009. It is owned by Yevlakh TV LLC and headquartered in the city of Yevlakh.

== History ==
EL TV was founded on 2 March 2009, headquartered in a three-story building in Yevlakh. It was set to broadcast every day for fifteen to sixteen hours, with news broadcasts allocated twice a day. Its broadcasts were to cover several parts of central Azerbaijan, including the city of Mingachevir, as well as near those territories then controlled by the Republic of Artsakh. This was a part of several development projects in Yevlakh at the time.

It commenced operations on 5 March, and went fully operational on 17 July 2009. EL TV introduced a new logo on 28 February 2014. It was one of the six regional television stations in Azerbaijan that formed the Region TV network in May 2014. The channel adopted the ARB branding on 19 September 2016 as it was renamed as ARB Aran. The name of ARB Aran was reverted to EL TV in 2020.

== Programming ==
EL TV primarily broadcasts programming and news reports regarding the Central Aran economic region, as well as highlights of social and cultural life, and programming regarding the heritage and traditions of the region. It also broadcasts educational programming.
