= Baku TV Tower =

Free-standing concrete telecommunications tower in Azerbaijan

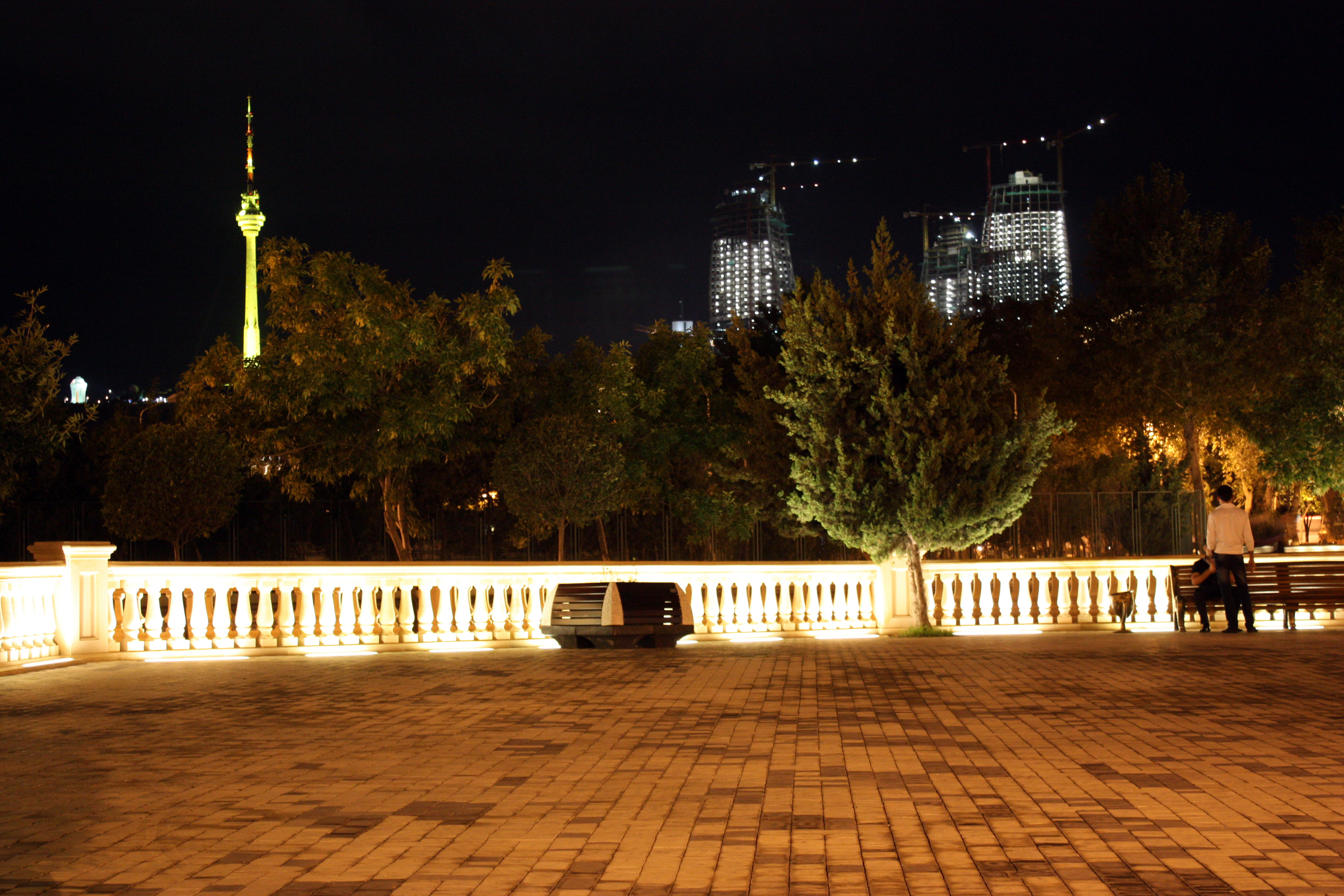
- Interactive map of the Baku TV Tower area

General information
- Type: TV broadcast
- Location: Baku, Azerbaijan
- Coordinates: 40°21′5″N 49°49′24″E
- Completed: 1996

Height
- Roof: 310 m (1,017 ft)

The Baku TV Tower (Azerbaijani: Televiziya Qülləsi), built in 1996, is a free standing concrete telecommunications tower in Baku, Azerbaijan. With a height of 310 metres (1017 ft or 480 meters from Caspian sea level), it is the second tallest structure in Azerbaijan after the chimneys of Azerbaijan Thermal Power Plant and the tallest reinforced concrete building in Caucasus.

The tower has become one of the most prominent landmarks of Baku, often in the establishing shot of films set in the city.

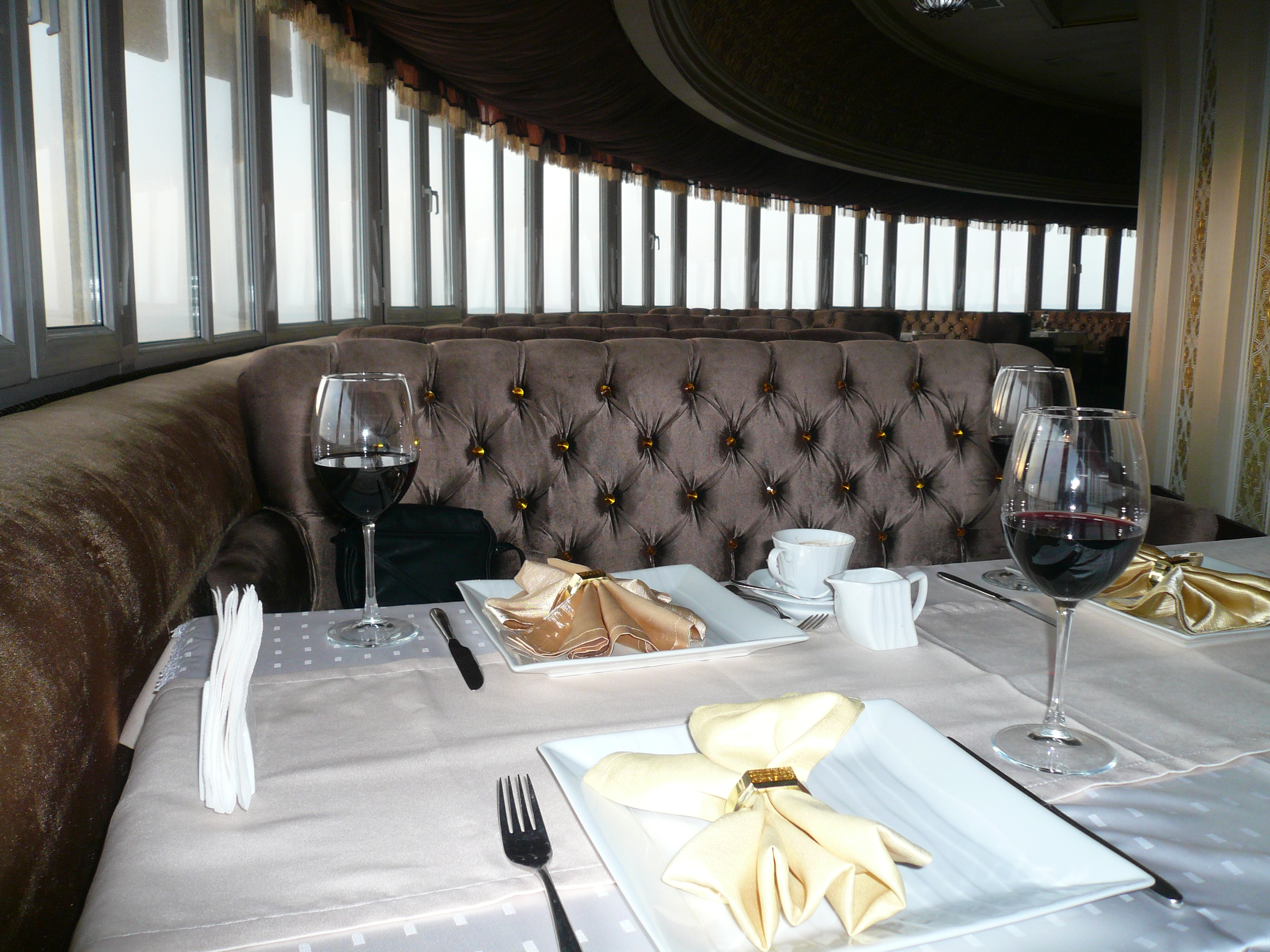
Restaurant of the Baku TV Tower

== History ==
The TV tower was designed on the basis of the decision of the Council of Ministers of the USSR after the order from the Ministry of Communications of Azerbaijan State Institute of the Ministry of Communications of the USSR. Construction work began in 1979 and according to the project construction plan it should have been completed in 1985. After the return of Heydar Aliyev to power in 1993, the construction of the tower was continued, and on July 6, 1996, with his participation, the official opening ceremony of the complex was carried.

A rotating restaurant on the 62nd floor (175 metres) of Azeri TV Tower was opened in 2008.

== Appearance ==
Occasionally, Baku TV Tower's lighting is changed to specific, unique arrangements for special events. Some annual events are cause for the tower to be specially lit. Such as alternating sections of the tower were lit to blue, red and green like in traditional Azerbaijani flag to help celebrate the national holidays. The tower has also had a variety of special lighting arrangements for New Year since 2004.

== See also ==
- List of towers
