= Administrative Review Board (Labor) =

Agency in the United States department of Labor

Agency overview
- Formed: 1996
- Jurisdiction: Federal government of the United States
- Headquarters: Washington, D.C.
- Employees: 15
- Agency executive: Susan Harthill, Chair and Chief Judge
- Website: www.dol.gov/agencies/arb

In April 1996, the United States Secretary of Labor established the Administrative Review Board (ARB) to succeed the former Board of Service Contract Appeals, Wage Appeals Board, and Office of Administrative Appeals. The board consists of a maximum of five members, one of whom is designated the chair. The Secretary of Labor appoints the members based upon their qualifications and competence in matters within the board's authority.

The board's cases arise upon appeal from decisions of Department of Labor Administrative Law Judges or the administrator of the department's Wage and Hour Division. The board issues final agency decisions for the Secretary of Labor in cases arising under a wide range of labor laws, primarily involving environmental, transportation and securities whistleblower protection; immigration; child labor; employment discrimination; job training; seasonal and migrant workers and federal construction and service contracts. Depending upon the statute at issue, the board's decisions may be appealed to federal district or appellate courts.

== Organization ==
- Chief Judge and Chair
  - Administrative Appeals Judges
  - Vice-Chair
  - General Counsel
    - Attorneys and Paralegal Staff
