= MTV Ray Tracer graphic file =

MTV ray tracer bitmap refers to the output format of the MTV ray tracer program by Mark T. VandeWettering. It is a simple uncompressed true-color raster image format, similar to binary PPM format. Its name comes from the author's initials, and has no connection with the television channel MTV or the MTV file format used by portable media players.

MTV format can also be used by Rayshade. Rayshade also uses a multi-image extension of it, consisting of multiple files concatenated together.

MTV uses Neutral File Format (NFF) as its input format.

== Identifiers ==
The MTV software uses a filename extension of .pic. Third-party applications that support this format sometimes use .mtv instead.

== Software ==
- ImageMagick
- Konvertor
- Netpbm: mtvtoppm
- XnView
