= Yevlakh =

City in Azerbaijan

Yevlakh Yevlax
- City
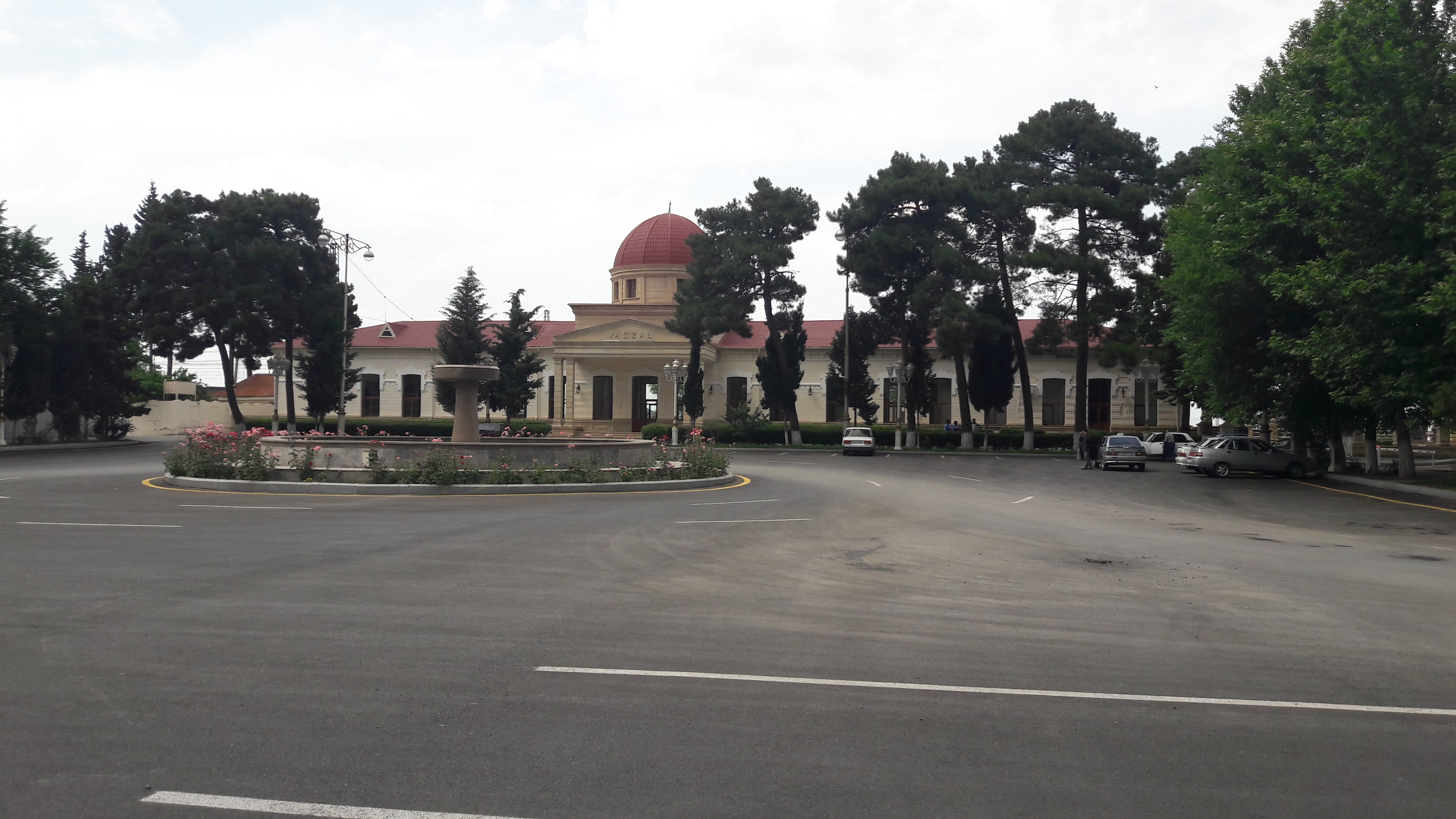
- Yevlakh railway station

- Coat of arms

- Yevlakh in Azerbaijan
- Coordinates: 40°37′02″N 47°09′00″E
- Country: Azerbaijan
- Region: Central Aran

Government
  - Mayor: Anar Taghiyev

Area
  - Total: 95 km^{2} (37 sq mi)
- Elevation: 17 m (56 ft)

Population (2023)
  - Total: 71,962
  - Density: 760/km^{2} (2,000/sq mi)
  - Population Rank in Azerbaijan: 9th
- Demonym: Yevlakhly (Yevlaxlı)
- Time zone: UTC+4 (AZT)
- Postal code: 6600
- Vehicle registration: 66 AZ
- Website: yevlax-ih.gov.az

Yevlakh (Azerbaijani: Yevlax, pronounced [jevˈlɑx]) is a city in Azerbaijan, 265 km west of the capital of Baku. It is surrounded by but administratively separate from the Yevlakh District.

== Etymology ==
The settlement is mentioned by the 13th century Armenian historian Stephen Orbelian in the form of Evaylakh (Armenian: Եւայլախ). The name "Yevlakh" is derived from Old Turkic and means "wetland" according to 20th century Soviet geographer Evgeny Pospelov.

== History ==
The city of Yevlakh was initially established as a station in the 1880s and known as the "Vagzal" for a long time by the local population. In the official documents and sources of the 19th century and early 20th century the city is referred to as Yevlakh station of Yelizavetpol province, then Yevlakh village of Yelizavetpol province, and in 1920, it took the name of Yevlakh village located in the Javanshir region. The Yevlakh region was first organized on February 20, 1935, by the decision of the Azerbaijan SSR. On February 1, 1939, by the decision of the Supreme Soviet of the Azerbaijani Soviet Socialist Republic, Yevlakh was referred to as a city. The Yevlakh region was abolished by the decision of the tenth session of the Supreme Soviet of the Azerbaijan Soviet Socialist Republic on December 26, 1962, and its territory was transferred to Agdash, Barda, and Gasim Ismayilov districts, and it became the industrial city in Azerbaijan SSR. In 1965, Yevlakh again turned into an independent region. By the decree of the Presidium of the Supreme Soviet of the Azerbaijani SSR on January 6, 1965, Yevlakh was included in the list of cities in the Azerbaijani SSR and started the construction of industrial enterprises in the city. Nowadays, the city has 4200 meters long Heydar Aliyev, Nizami Avenue, 5500 meters long, and 168 streets. The monument dedicated to Azerbaijan's national leader Heydar Aliyev that is located in the biggest square within the city: Heydar Aliyev Square, Heydar Aliyev Alley, Dede Gorgud, Samad Vurgun, Nizami, Friendship, Independence parks have been established lately.

In September 2023, the town was chosen as the site for meetings with representatives of Armenian residents of Nagorno-Karabakh after the 2023 Nagorno-Karabakh clashes.

== Geography ==
Yevlakh is located in the Central Aran Economic Region. The climate that is common for this region is dry subtropical.

== Climate ==
Yevlakh has a semi-arid climate (Köppen climate classification: BSk).

Climate data for Yevlakh (1991–2020 normals)
Month	Jan	Feb	Mar	Apr	May	Jun	Jul	Aug	Sep	Oct	Nov	Dec	Year
Mean daily maximum °C (°F)	8.8 (47.8)	10.5 (50.9)	14.5 (58.1)	22.3 (72.1)	27.0 (80.6)	32.0 (89.6)	34.6 (94.3)	34.2 (93.6)	28.6 (83.5)	22.6 (72.7)	14.5 (58.1)	10.0 (50.0)	21.6 (70.9)
Daily mean °C (°F)	4.5 (40.1)	5.5 (41.9)	8.8 (47.8)	15.9 (60.6)	20.7 (69.3)	25.5 (77.9)	28.1 (82.6)	27.9 (82.2)	22.7 (72.9)	17.0 (62.6)	9.9 (49.8)	5.9 (42.6)	16.0 (60.9)
Mean daily minimum °C (°F)	0.1 (32.2)	0.4 (32.7)	3.6 (38.5)	9.4 (48.9)	14.3 (57.7)	18.9 (66.0)	21.6 (70.9)	21.6 (70.9)	16.8 (62.2)	11.3 (52.3)	5.3 (41.5)	1.7 (35.1)	10.4 (50.7)
Average precipitation mm (inches)	16 (0.6)	20 (0.8)	22 (0.9)	34 (1.3)	47 (1.9)	45 (1.8)	22 (0.9)	22 (0.9)	17 (0.7)	49 (1.9)	25 (1.0)	20 (0.8)	339 (13.3)
Average precipitation days	4	5	6	6	7	5	3	2	3	5	4	4	54
Mean monthly sunshine hours	104.5	97.7	130.4	189.6	222.3	262.2	280.1	261.1	217.9	162.3	112.4	104.5	2,145
Source 1: NOAA (precipitation and sun 1971–1990)
Source 2: Meteostat

== Demographics ==
According to 2019 census, population of Yevlakh is 128,700 people. As of 2016, the population increased in the city in comparison with the previous years by about 7.1 thousand people. According to the population census data in 2009, urban population accounted for 55.04% and rural was 44.96%.

Population

(Based on population census data in 2009)
Area	Total		Male		Female	
Area	number	%	number	%	number	%
Yevlakh city	57681	48,96	26098	46,99	31583	50,72

== Economy ==
There are agricultural processing enterprises, manufacturing and industrial complexes within Yevlakh city.

== Libraries ==
There are 45 libraries that serve the population of the district. Ten of them are located in the city center and 35 in the villages.

=== Music and media ===
The regional channel EL TV is headquartered in the city.

== Transport ==
=== Air ===
Yevlax Airport is the only airport in the city. The airport is connected by bus to the city center.

=== Rail ===
Kars–Tbilisi–Baku railway will directly connect the city with Turkey and Georgia.

Yevlakh sits on one of the Azerbaijani primary rail lines running east–west connecting the capital, Baku, with the rest of the country. The Kars–Tbilisi–Baku railway will run along the line through the city. The railway provides both human transportation and transport of goods and commodities such as oil and gravel.

Yevlakh's Central Railway Station is the terminus for national and international rail links to the city. The Kars–Tbilisi–Baku railway, which will directly connect Turkey, Georgia and Azerbaijan, began to be constructed in 2007 and has been completed in 2015. The completed branch connects Yevlakh with Tbilisi in Georgia, and from there, trains continue to Akhalkalaki, and Kars in Turkey.

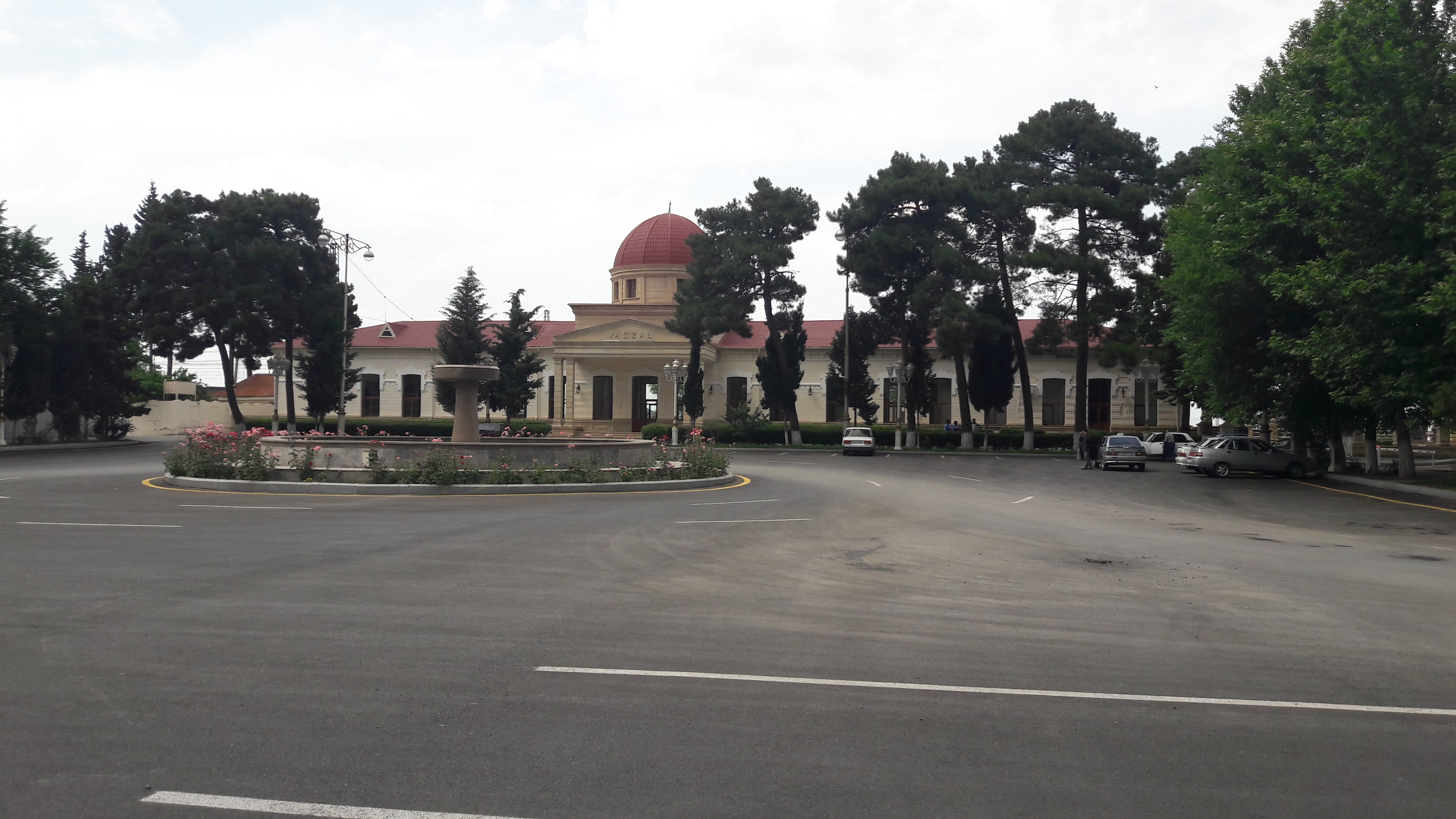
Yevlakh Rail Road Station

== Notable natives ==
The city's notable residents include: Orthodox theologian Pavel Florensky, human rights activist Anar Mammadli and government civilian Elmar Valiyev.

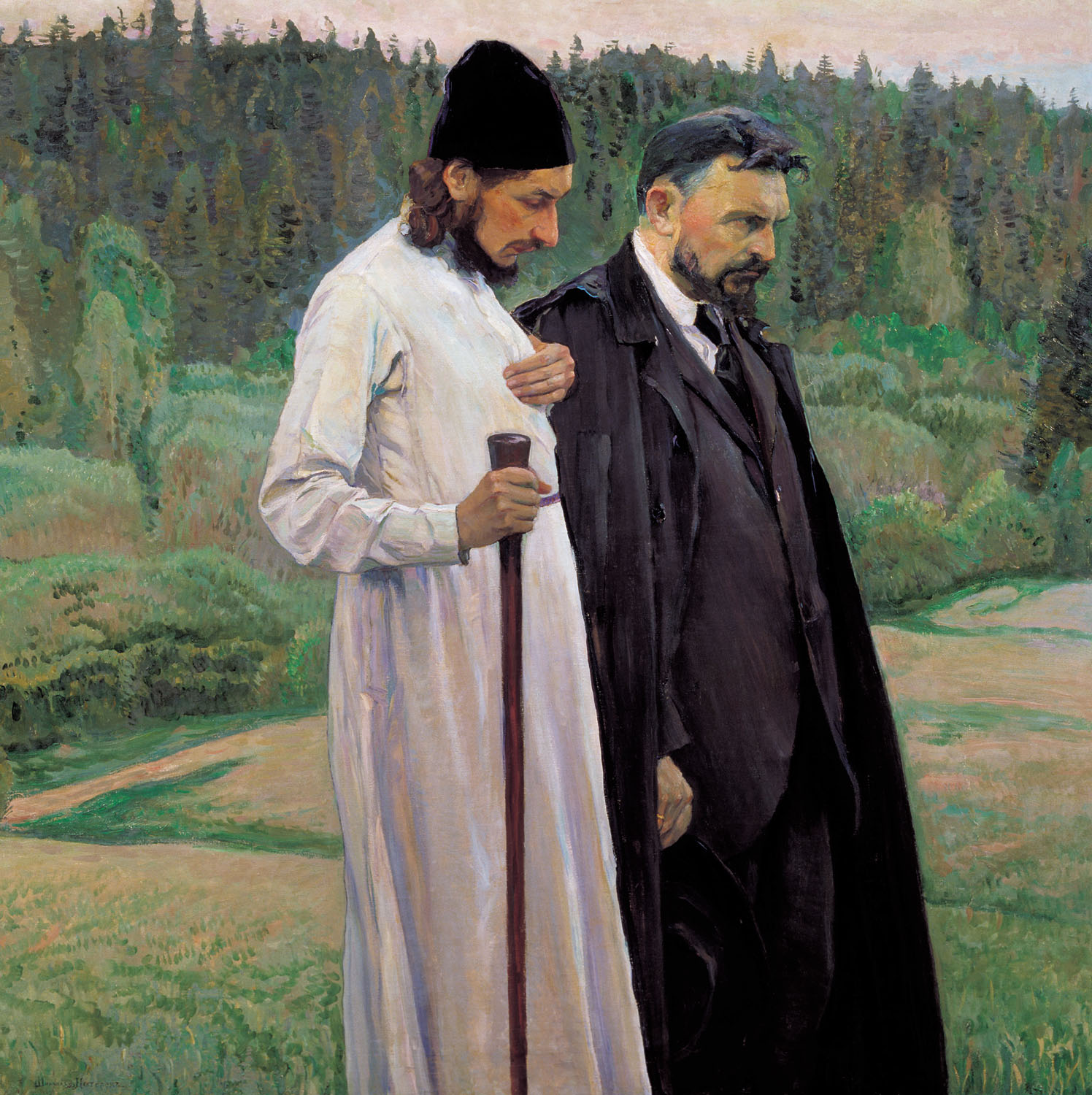
Pavel Florensky, was considered Neomartyr by Eastern Orthodox Church
