= Lider TV =

Azeri television channel

Lider TV and Radio Azerbaijan
- Type: Broadcast
- Country: Azerbaijan

Ownership
- Owner: Media Ltd.

History
- Launched: 1 September 2000
- Closed: 1 June 2021

Lider TV was a private television channel in Azerbaijan. It was founded on 1 September 2000 by Media Ltd. Lider TV was declared bankrupt by the Commercial Court on 16 June 2020, later defunct since 1 June 2021.
