= Khachmaz (city) =

- Azerbaijani: Xaçmaz
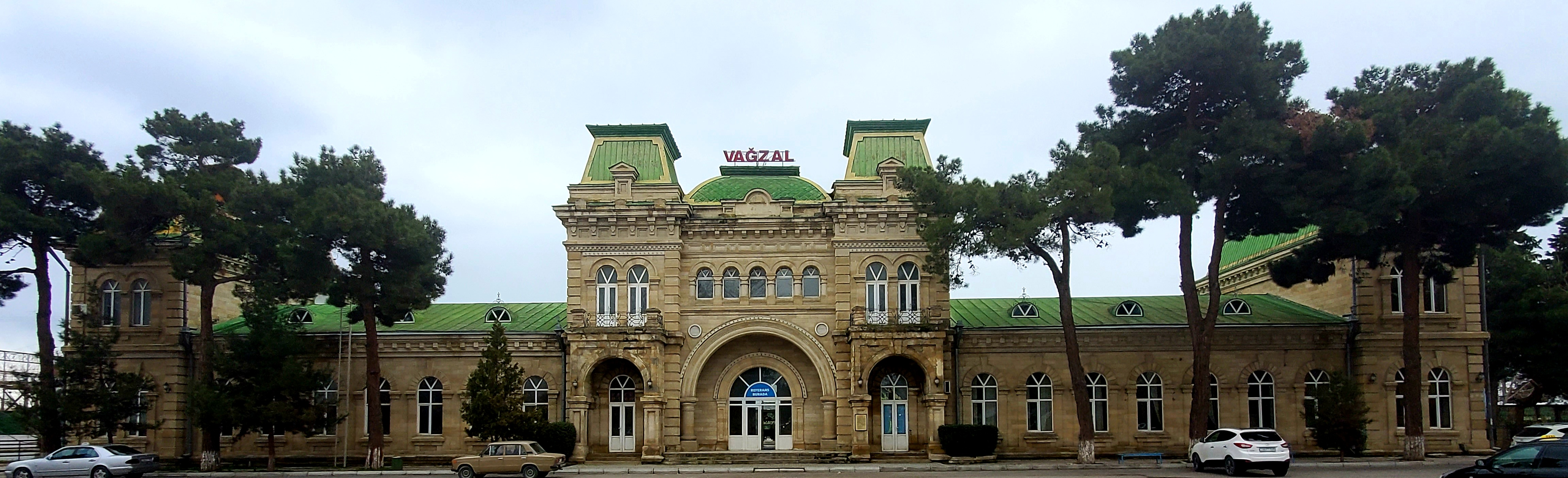
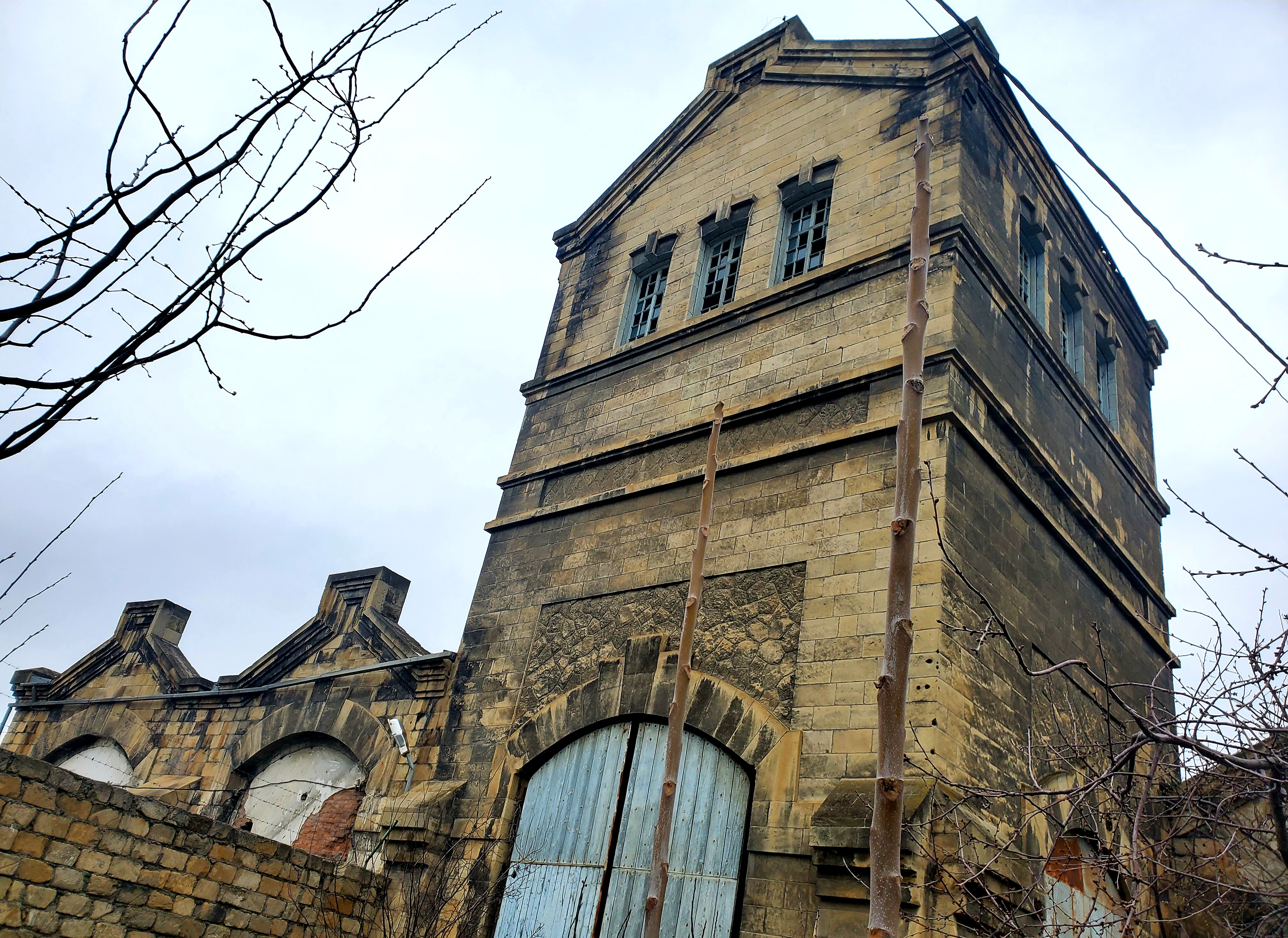
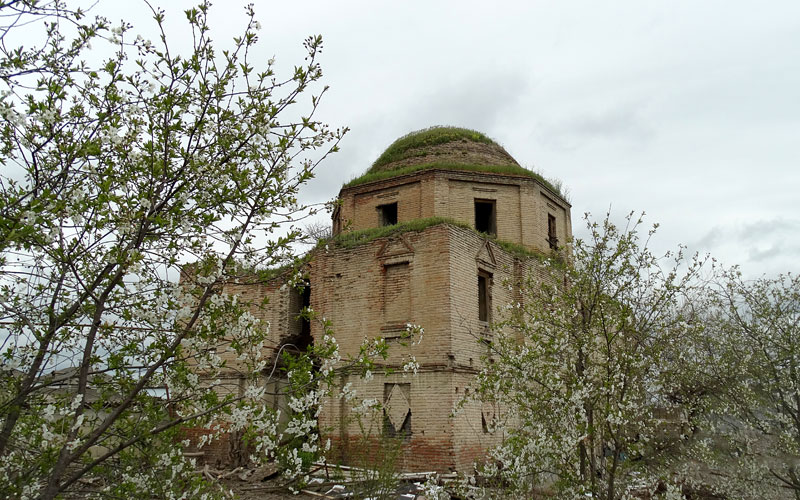
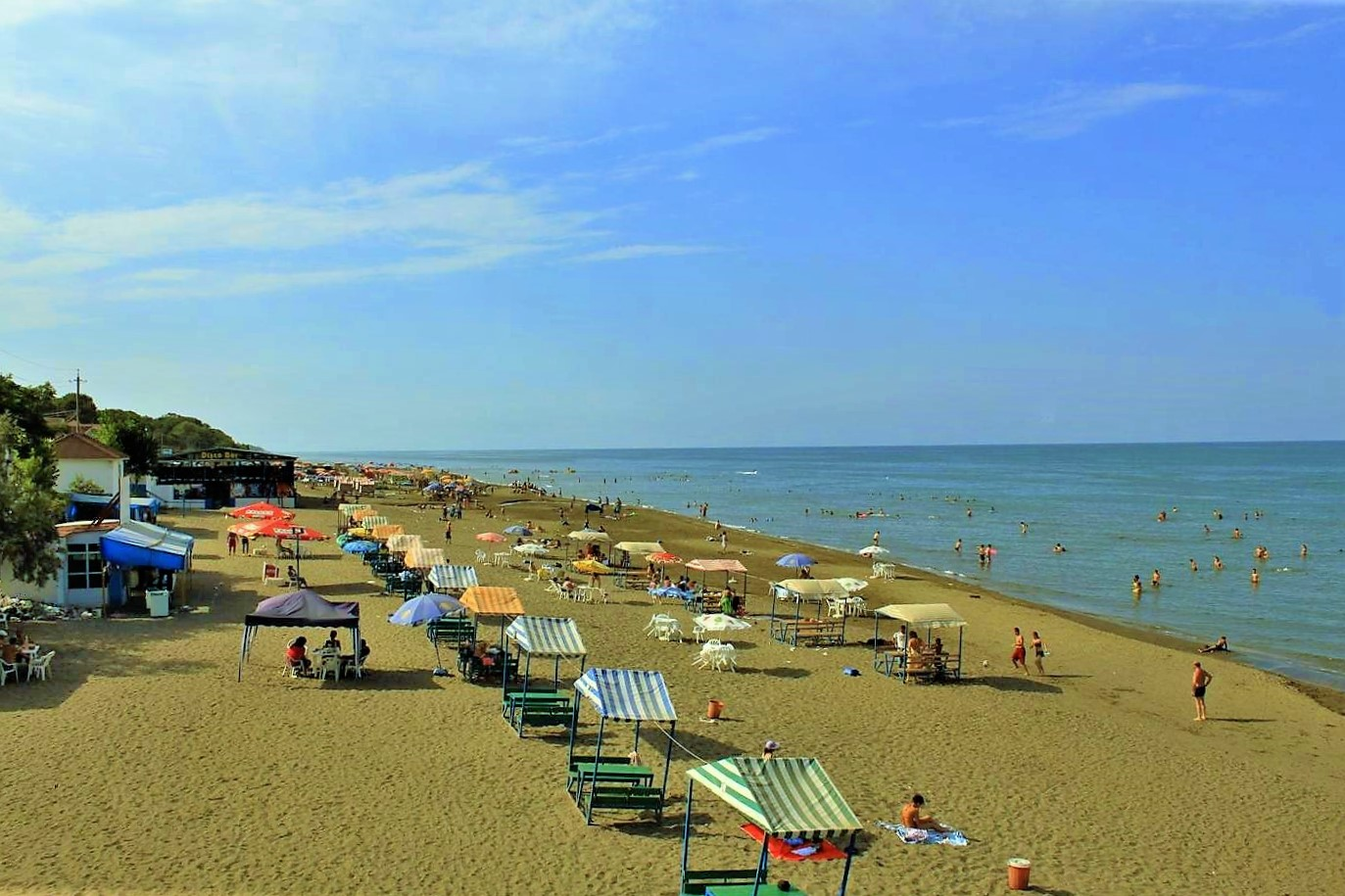
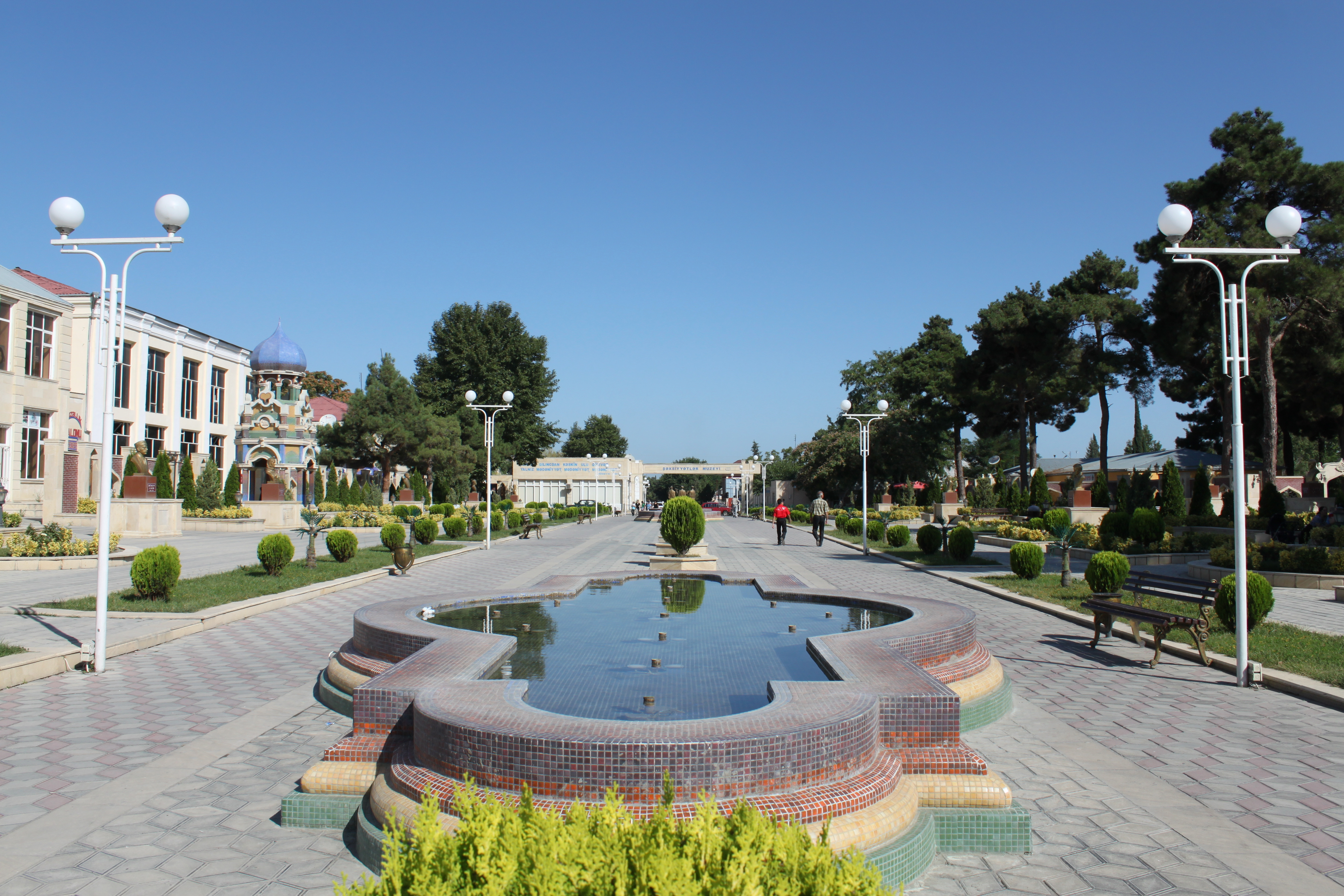
- Khachmaz Railway Station Old Bread Factory Aziz Aliyev Museum Museum of history and local studies 18th-century church Nabran Beach Park

- Location within Azerbaijan Location within Caspian Sea Location within Caucasus Mountains
- Coordinates: 41°28′15″N 48°48′35″E
- Country: Azerbaijan
- District: Khachmaz
- Region: Europe
- Established: 1938
- Elevation: 42 m (138 ft)

Population (2018)
  - Total: 67,600
- Time zone: UTC+4 (AZT)
- Area code: +994 172

Khachmaz (Azerbaijani: Xaçmaz, Lezgian: Хъачмаз) is a town in the Khachmaz District of Azerbaijan.

== Climate ==
Khachmaz has a cool semi-arid climate (Köppen BSk) characterised by very warm summers, chilly though not severe winters, and generally low precipitation.

Climate data for Khachmaz (1971–1990)
| Month | Jan | Feb | Mar | Apr | May | Jun | Jul | Aug | Sep | Oct | Nov | Dec | Year |
|---|---|---|---|---|---|---|---|---|---|---|---|---|---|
| Daily mean °C (°F) | 1.3 (34.3) | 1.6 (34.9) | 4.1 (39.4) | 10.2 (50.4) | 15.6 (60.1) | 20.2 (68.4) | 23.3 (73.9) | 22.4 (72.3) | 18.4 (65.1) | 12.4 (54.3) | 7.5 (45.5) | 3.4 (38.1) | 11.7 (53.1) |
| Mean daily minimum °C (°F) | −1.5 (29.3) | −1.2 (29.8) | 1.4 (34.5) | 6.3 (43.3) | 11.4 (52.5) | 16.3 (61.3) | 19.6 (67.3) | 18.5 (65.3) | 15.0 (59.0) | 9.4 (48.9) | 4.9 (40.8) | 1.2 (34.2) | 8.4 (47.2) |
| Average precipitation mm (inches) | 24 (0.9) | 23 (0.9) | 25 (1.0) | 36 (1.4) | 28 (1.1) | 13 (0.5) | 12 (0.5) | 16 (0.6) | 26 (1.0) | 41 (1.6) | 31 (1.2) | 27 (1.1) | 302 (11.8) |
| Average rainy days | 7 | 6 | 6 | 4 | 5 | 3 | 3 | 3 | 4 | 7 | 7 | 8 | 63 |
Source: NOAA

== Economy ==
The economy of Khachmaz is partially agricultural, partially tourist-based, with some industries in operation.

=== Tourism ===
Khachmaz is considered a popular tourist destination, especially due to the Nabran municipality. The combination of a warm summer climate, woods along the seashore, and clean golden beaches was exploited by the construction of large numbers of hotels and apartments in Khacmaz.

== International relations ==
=== Twin towns—sister cities ===
Khacmaz is twinned with the following cities:

- Yalta, Ukraine, (since 2009)
- Derbent, Russia.
- (Georgia (country)) Gardabani, Georgia.
- Iğdır, Turkey.

== Gallery ==
Mirza Fatali Akhundov Library

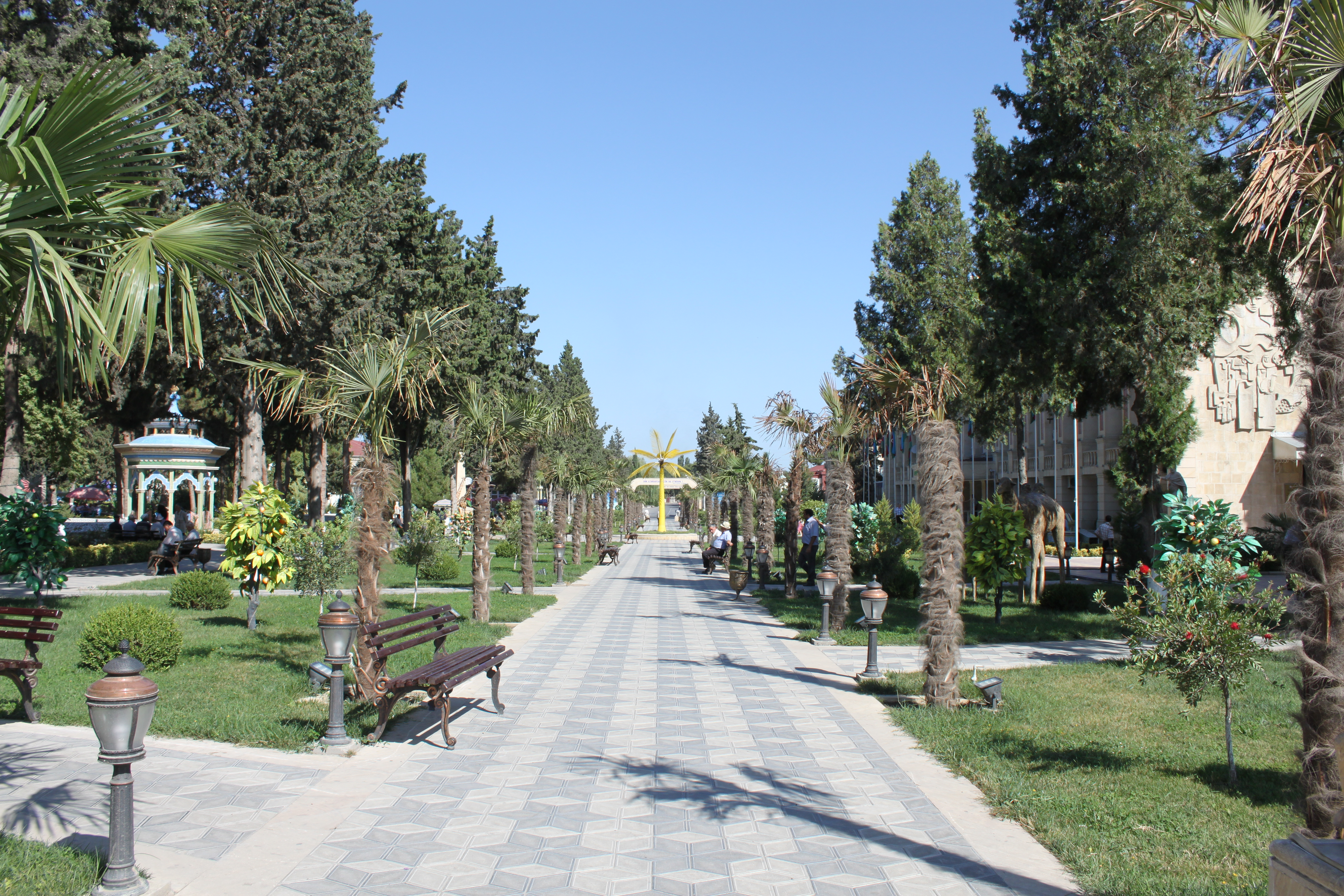
Khachmaz city park

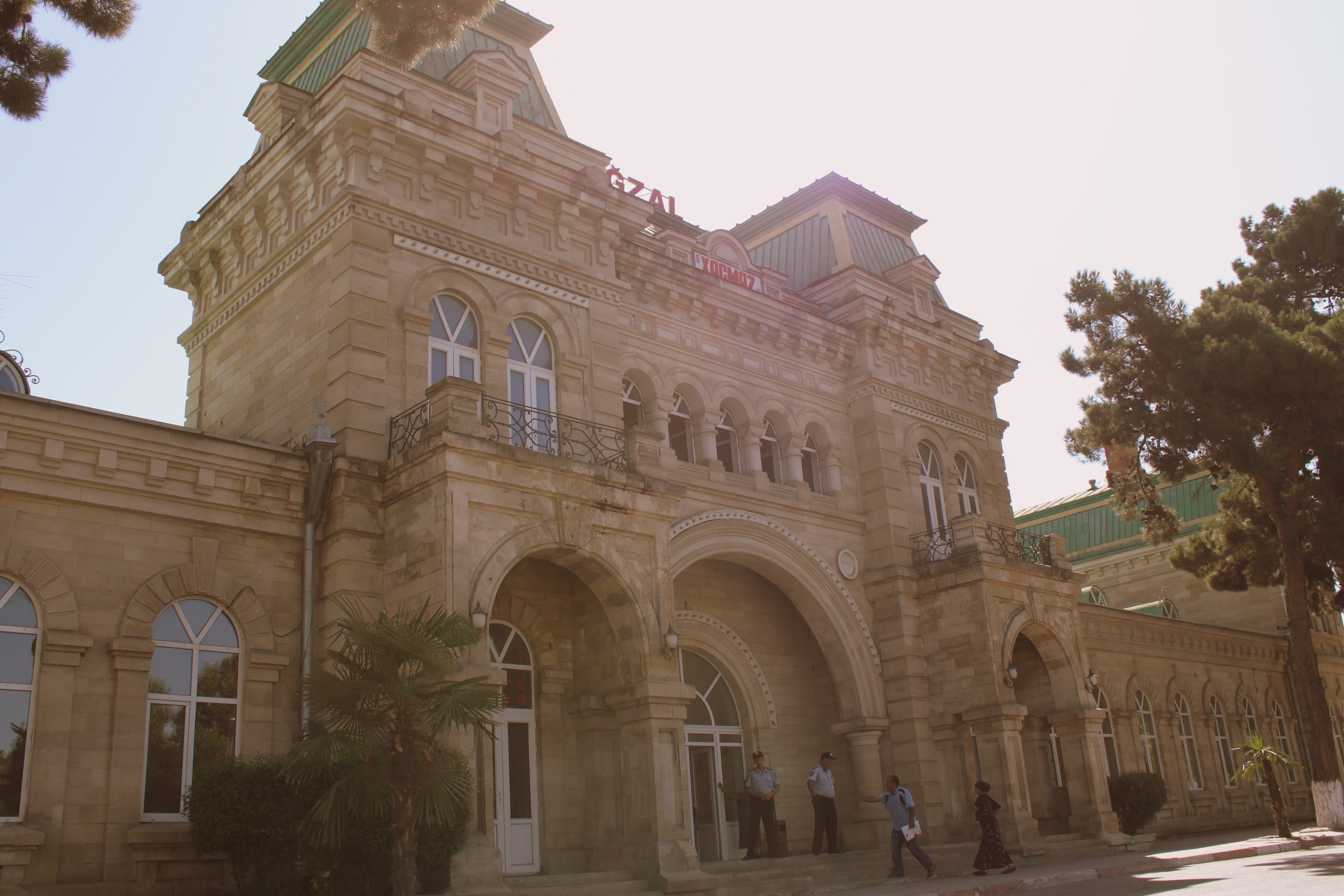
Railway station

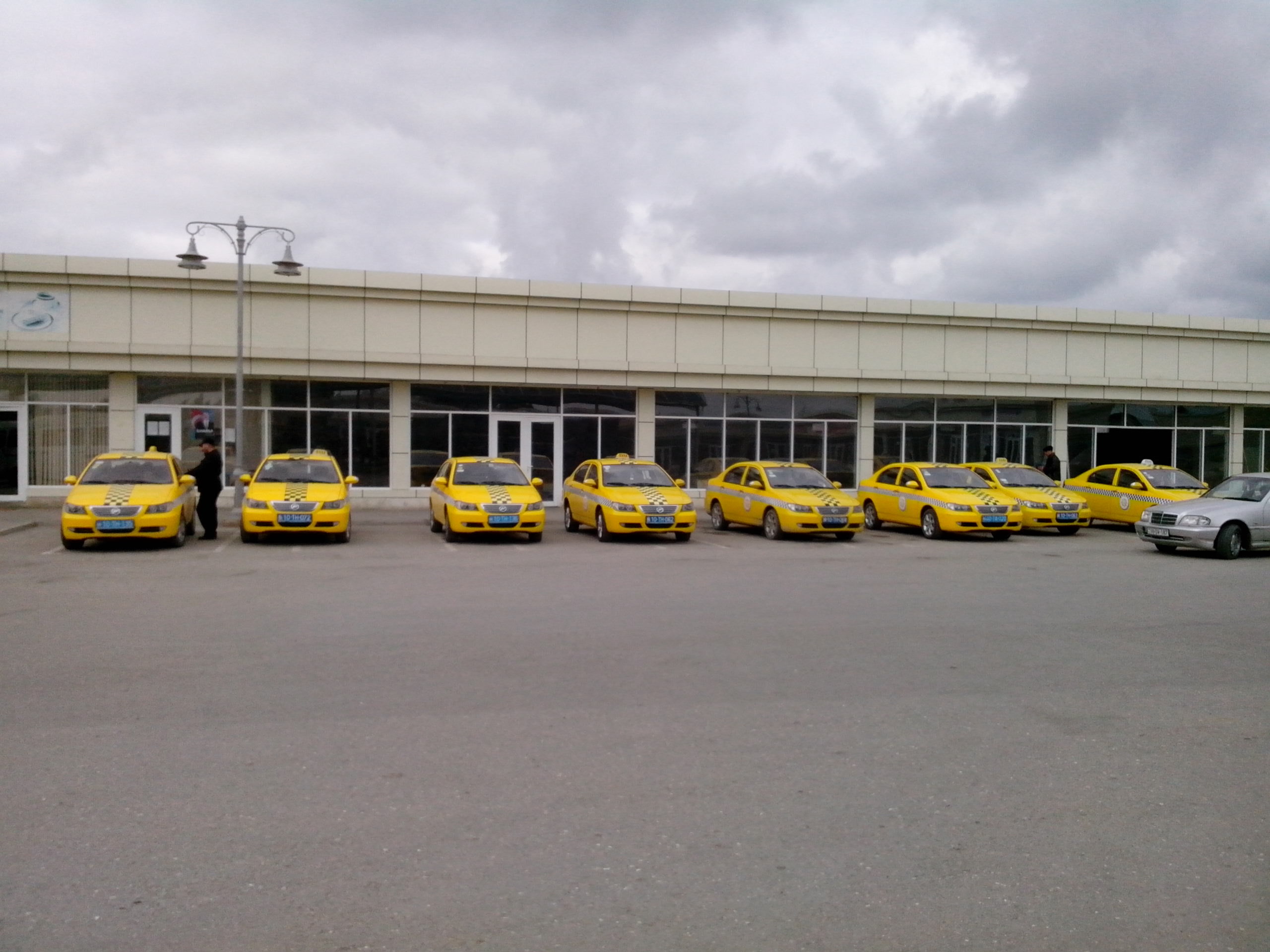
City Yellow Cabs from NAZ
