= National Television and Radio Council of the Republic of Azerbaijan =

Regulation and censory organization

- Azərbaycan Respublikası Milli Televiziya və Radio Şurası

Agency overview
- Formed: October 5, 2002
- Website: http://www.ntrc.gov.az/

The National Television and Radio Council of the Republic of Azerbaijan regulates and censors media and entertainment content in Azerbaijan. The organization has shut down news outlets for content considered objectionable by the authoritarian regime in Azerbaijan.

The agency was established on October 5, 2002, with the Decree of the President of the Republic of Azerbaijan.

Nominally, broadcasting is under Azerbaijani law free and state interference is forbidden, but in practice, the regime substantially curtails press freedom and freedom of speech.

== Activities ==
Activity of the Council includes ensuring the implementation of television and radio broadcasting policies and to regulate this activity. The main tasks of the council are:

- to regulate the actions of television and radio broadcasters;
- to secure public interest in broadcasting;
- to monitor compliance with the legislation on television and radio broadcasting.

The council is funded from the state budget.

== Members ==
The Council consists of 9 members. Three members of the Board are appointed for two years, three for four years, and three for six years. Members have the right to be reappointed. The members of the Council elect the chairman and the vice-chairman. The council is headed by the Chairman of the council. The Council determines the number of staff members of the Board, appoints its staff and creates structural units within the cost estimate.

== Cooperation ==
On 24–27 May 2004 the chairman of the Council Nusheravan Maharramov visited Turkey to establish cooperation with "Radio Televizyon Ust Kurulu" (RTUK) of Turkey. The parties signed an agreement on "On cooperation and experience exchange".

=== Developments ===
On 24 February 2015, law passed on Amendments to the Law of the Republic of Azerbaijan "On Television and Radio Broadcasting".

On 15 December 2017, Law of the Republic of Azerbaijan on Amendments to the Law of the Republic of Azerbaijan "On Television and Radio Broadcasting" was passed.

The latest amendment was made on November 2, 2018, by the Law of the Republic of Azerbaijan on Amendments to the Law of the Republic of Azerbaijan "On Television and Radio Broadcasting".

At the meeting held on 19 May 2016, the presidential decree dated May 12, 2016 "On providing one-time financial aid to private broadcasters in the Republic of Azerbaijan" was discussed. 2 million manat were allocated to National Television and Radio Council from the reserve fund.

Within the framework of "National Program for Action to Raise Effectiveness of the Protection of Human Rights and Freedoms in the Republic of Azerbaijan", National Television and Radio Council prepared TV programs that educate and enlighten children and studied the possibility to establish a television for children in 2012–2013.

National Television and Radio Council arranges the exercises for the freedom of speech and thoughts for the mass media under the "National Program for Action to Raise Effectiveness of the Protection of Human Rights and Freedoms in the Republic of Azerbaijan".

== See also ==
- Television in Azerbaijan
- List of Azerbaijani-language television channels
