= Azad Azerbaijan TV =

Azad Azərbaycan TV
- Country: Azerbaijan
- Broadcast area: Nationwide
- Headquarters: Yasamal, Baku

Programming
- Language: Azerbaijani
- Picture format: 1080i HDTV

Ownership
- Owner: Azad Azerbaijan Independent Teleradio Company

History
- Launched: 25 December 2000; 25 years ago
- Former names: Sara TV (1992-1999) (Its frequencies were transferred to Azad Azerbaijan TV in 2000.)

Links
- Website: atv.az

Azad Azerbaijan TV (Azerbaijani: Azad Azərbaycan TV), also known by its acronym ATV, is an Azerbaijani privately owned national terrestrial television channel. It is owned by the Azad Azerbaijan Independent Teleradio Company. ATV began broadcasting on 25 December 2000, and is headquartered in the Yasamal raion of Baku.

== History ==
"Azad Azərbaycan Teleradio Yayım Şirkəti" was registered by the Ministry of Justice of the Republic of Azerbaijan on March 13, 1998 and started broadcasting on December 25, 2000. Its initial offer consisted mainly of music videos, TV series and animated series.. In 2002, it started broadcasting news bulletins under the name "Son Xəbər".

During the events that happened on the night of the 2003 presidential elections, ATV reporters and camera operators were gravely hurt.

Until December 31, 2007, alongside Azerbaijani-language programming, it also aired content in Russian (Russkie Zvyozdı). In 2008, according to a law approved by the MTRS, all programs shown on ATV were in Azerbaijani.

In October 2009, ATV International started broadcasting.

In 2011, fundamental changes were made to the channel. Its management changed. In alignment with this, the logo was changed on May 10, 2011.

The channel improved its technical quality in September 2012, becoming a 24-hour channel. On September 15, 2015, it converted to 16:9.

The channel had scandalous relations with ANS TV. The situation began in 2015, after a fire at a building in the residential housing estate in the district of Binagadi, when Matanat Aliverdiyeva said on "Gundalik" that: "we shouldn't make this tragedy a tragedy, as if it were wind, it was a movie, we watched and it ended". With that scandal, ANS's Xəbərçi criticized ANS TV. Another scandal was related to a shooting suffered by ATV in one of the churches of neighboring Georgia, in September that year. In that report, ANS TV accused ATV of playing with the viewers' religious sentiments.
