= Mirshahin Agayev =

Azerbaijani journalist

Mirshahin Aghayev
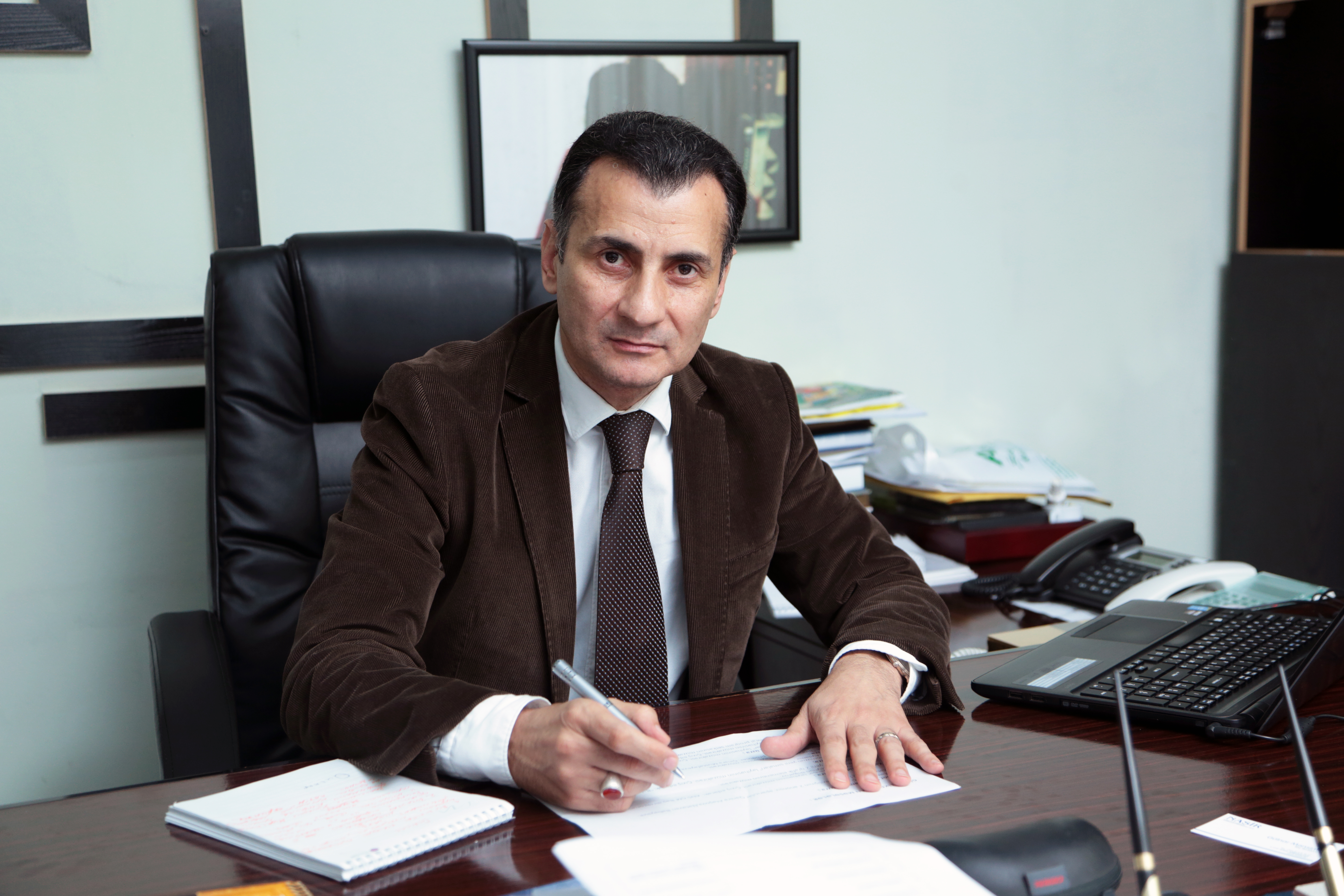
- Born: 12 November 1963 (age 62); Pirembel, Yardimli District, Azerbaijan SSR, Soviet Union
- Occupations: Journalist, Editor, Executive President, General Director
- Writing career
- Period: 1985–2025

Mirshahin Dilaver oghlu Aghayev (Azerbaijani: Mirşahin Ağayev Dilavər oğlu; born 12 November 1963 in Yardimli, Azerbaijan) also known as simply Mir Shahin (Azerbaijani: Mir Şahin) is a journalist and reporter during the Nagorno-Karabakh conflict. He's now the general director of Real Tv. Before he had Production of ANS Group of Companies and was an Executive Producer of ANS Independent Broadcasting Media Company. He also used to be the General Director of ANS ChM Radio Broadcasting Company. Aghayev is co-founder of several firms under ANS Group of Companies which include ANS Independent Broadcasting Media Company, ANS Chm Radio Broadcasting Company, ANS Commerce, ANS-PRESS Publishing Company.

From 1992 through 2005, Aghayev held a position of Chief Editor at ANS Independent Broadcasting Media Company. Mirshahin is known for his reports from frontlines during the First Nagorno-Karabakh War. Aghayev also holds the title of Honored Journalist of the Republic.

== Awards ==
- Order of the 2nd degree "For Service to the Fatherland Order" by the Decree of President Ilham Aliyev on July 22, 2020.
- Order of the 1st degree "For Service to the Fatherland Order" by the Decree of President Ilham Aliyev on November 11, 2023.

== Criticism ==
Mirshahin Aghayev has faced significant criticism for his involvement in smear campaigns and disinformation targeting civil society activists, independent journalists, and opposition figures. Observers and international watchdogs have reported that Aghayev, particularly through his leadership roles in ANS TV and later Real TV, used these platforms to publicly attack individuals and groups critical of the Azerbaijani government.

In the late 2000s, Aghayev's investigative reporting on corruption triggered a widely publicized conflict with academician and MP Jalal Aliyev, the brother of former President Heydar Aliyev. In an episode of ANS TV's "Hesabat" program, Aghayev named Jalal Aliyev among several government figures allegedly involved in corruption. In response, Jalal Aliyev publicly insulted Aghayev during a televised address, using highly offensive language that later became widely quoted and debated.

Later, under Real TV's banner, Aghayev reportedly played a central role in media campaigns discrediting opposition members and journalists. One prominent case involved Real TV's dissemination of private messages and videos belonging to exiled journalist Sevinc Osmanqizi in 2019. Aghayev publicly accused her of collaborating with foreign intelligence and threatened to release intimate content, which the channel later broadcast. These actions drew sharp condemnation from international press freedom advocates, who labeled the broadcasts as invasions of privacy and attempts to intimidate and discredit independent voices."Sevinc Osmanqızının şantajı: Real TV-dən yayılanlar" (in Azerbaijani).

During the build-up to COP29 in 2024, Aghayev used his program to attack Azerbaijani climate activists who had participated in a protest alongside Greta Thunberg. In his broadcast, Aghayev accused the activists of acting as agents of foreign interests, comparing them unfavorably to international critics of Azerbaijan such as U.S. Congressman Frank Pallone. Human rights defenders characterized these attacks as part of a wider state-sponsored disinformation campaign. "Azerbaijan state media fights back against COP29 critics". Eurasianet. 6 December 2024.

In a 2019 interview, Aghayev openly stated that Real TV was no longer impartial and had "taken a side," promising harsher rhetoric against government critics going forward. Media experts and civil society organizations have frequently cited this admission as evidence of Real TV's transformation into a propaganda outlet."Mir Şahin: "Tərəf seçmişik və daha da sərt olacağıq"". Toplum TV (in Azerbaijani). 17 July 2019.

== See also ==
- ANS Group of Companies
- Chingiz Mustafayev
- Osman Mirzayev
