= Azerbaijan in the Eurovision Song Contest 2015 =

- Eurovision Song Contest 2015
- Country: Azerbaijan
- Selection process: Internal selection
- Announcement date: 15 March 2015

Competing entry
- Song: "Hour of the Wolf"
- Artist: Elnur Hüseynov
- Songwriters: Sandra Bjurman; Nicolas Rebscher; Nicklas Lif; Lina Hansson

Placement
- Semi-final result: Qualified (10th, 53 points)
- Final result: 12th, 49 points

Participation chronology

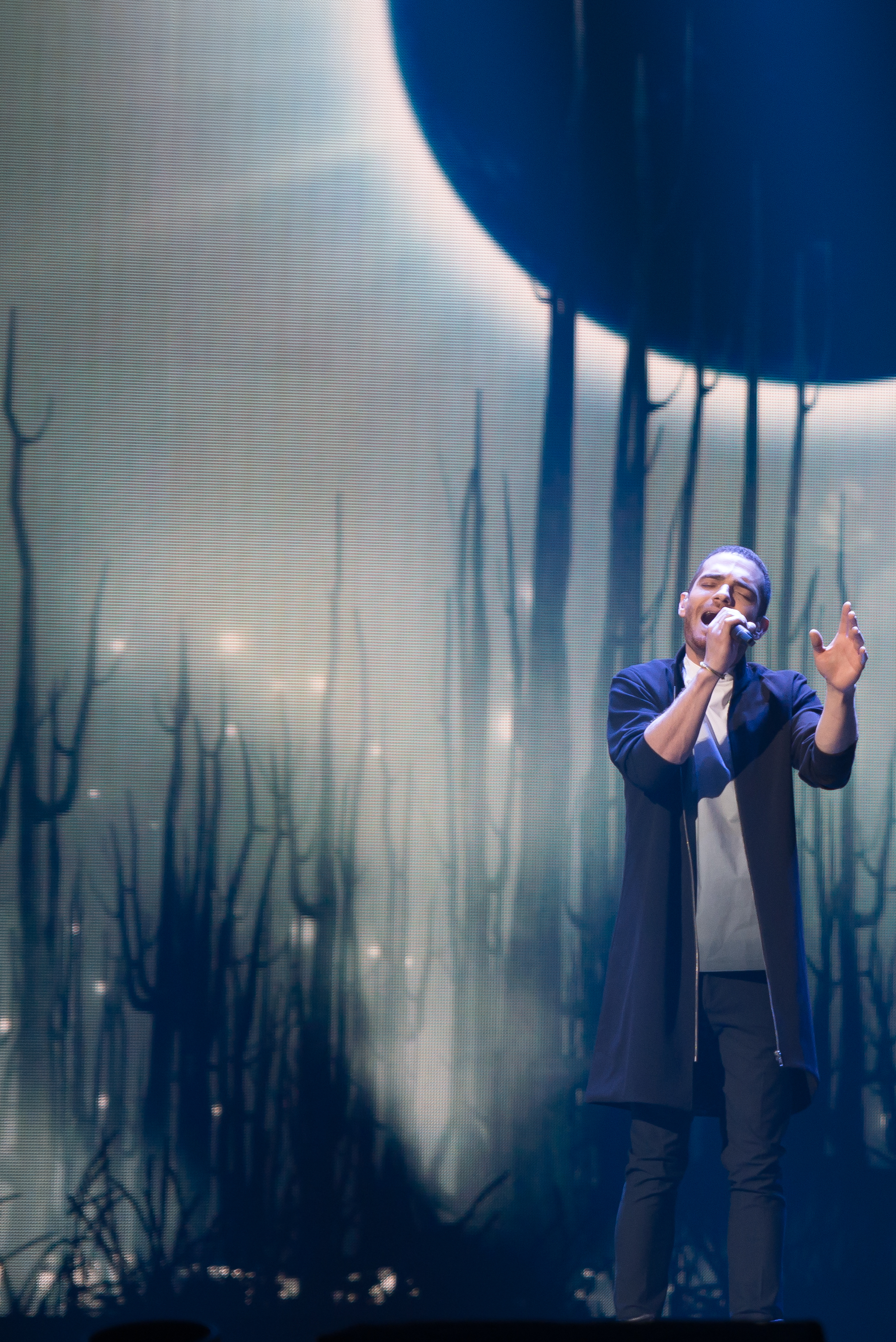
Elnur Hüseynov performing in Vienna

Azerbaijan was represented at the Eurovision Song Contest 2015 with the song "Hour of the Wolf" written by Sandra Bjurman, Nicolas Rebscher, Nicklas Lif and Lina Hansson. The song was performed by Elnur Hüseynov, who was internally selected by the Azerbaijani broadcaster İctimai Television (İTV) in March 2015 to represent the nation at the 2015 contest in Vienna, Austria. Hüseynov had previously represented Azerbaijan in the Eurovision Song Contest in 2008 together with Samir Javadzadeh where they placed eighth with the song "Day After Day". The song "Hour of the Wolf" was presented to the public on 15 March.

Azerbaijan was drawn to compete in the second semi-final of the Eurovision Song Contest which took place on 21 May 2015. Performing during the show in position 11, "Hour of the Wolf" was announced among the top 10 entries of the first semi-final and therefore qualified to compete in the final on 14 May. It was later revealed that Azerbaijan placed tenth out of the 17 participating countries in the semi-final with 53 points. In the final, Azerbaijan performed in position 24 and placed twelfth out of the 27 participating countries, scoring 49 points.

== Background ==
Prior to the 2015 contest, Azerbaijan had participated in the Eurovision Song Contest seven times since its first entry in 2008. Azerbaijan had won the contest on one occasion in 2011 with the song "Running Scared" performed by Ell and Nikki. Since their debut in 2008, Azerbaijan has had a string of successful results, qualifying to the final and placing in the top ten each year until 2014, including a third-place result in 2009 with the song "Always" performed by AySel and Arash and a second-place result in 2013 with the song "Hold Me" performed by Farid Mammadov. However, in 2014, Azerbaijan achieved their lowest placing in the contest to this point, placing 22nd in the final with the song "Start a Fire" performed by Dilara Kazimova.

The Azerbaijani national broadcaster, İctimai Television (İTV), broadcasts the event within Azerbaijan and organises the selection process for the nation's entry. İTV confirmed their intentions to participate at the 2015 Eurovision Song Contest on 4 September 2014. Azerbaijan had used various methods to select the Azerbaijani entry in the past, including internal selections of both the artist and song, as well as national finals to select their artist followed by an internal selection to determine the song. Between 2011 and 2013, Azerbaijan organized a national final titled Milli Seçim Turu to select the performer, song or both for Eurovision. In 2014, the broadcaster utilised an existing talent show format titled Böyük Səhnə where the winning performer would subsequently be given an internally selected song. For their 2015 entry, the broadcaster internally selected both the artist and song that would represent Azerbaijan.

== Before Eurovision ==
=== Internal selection ===
On 27 February 2015, İTV announced that both the artist and song that would represent Azerbaijan at the Eurovision Song Contest 2015 would be selected internally. Their announcement called for interested artists and songwriters to submit their applications and entries to the broadcaster by 6 March 2015. Eligible artists were those that were citizens of Azerbaijan or part of the Azerbaijani diaspora, while songwriters could be of any nationality.

On 15 March 2015, İTV announced that Elnur Hüseynov would represent Azerbaijan, performing the song "Hour of the Wolf". Hüseynov had previously represented Azerbaijan when the nation debuted during the 2008 contest, where he performed the song "Day After Day" together with Samir Javadzadeh and placed eighth. In February 2015, Hüseynov won the Turkish version of the reality television singing competition The Voice: O Ses Türkiye. The selection of Elnur Hüseynov and "Hour of the Wolf" as the Azerbaijani Eurovision entry was based on the decision of a national jury panel, whose members included the General Director of İTV Jamil Guliyev and Head of Delegation Tamilla Shirinova, from three potential entries performed during an audition round on 13 March.

"Hour of the Wolf" was written by Sandra Bjurman, Nicolas Rebscher, Nicklas Lif and Lina Hansson, and was presented alongside the entry announcement via the release of the official music video. In regards to his selection as the Azerbaijani Eurovision contestant and the song, Hüseynov stated: "Eurovision 2015 is a great chance to present myself as a solo artist. I believe in my entry song as it has so many powerful messages. It is truly a song with great meaning of which the most important is 'that every heart deserves a fight' and we should never give up. We must fight for our happiness and for the better future. I'm going to the Eurovision to share this message with the European audience."

Results of the internal selection
Artist	Song	Songwriter(s)	Place
Elnur Hüseynov	"Hour of the Wolf"	Sandra Bjurman, Nicolas Rebscher, Nicklas Lif, Lina Hansson	1
Narmina Behbudova	"Apollo"	Elias Näslin, Nicolas Günthardt, Alessandra Günthardt	2
Narmina Seyidova	Unknown		3

=== Promotion ===
Elnur Hüseynov made several appearances across Europe to specifically promote "Hour of the Wolf" as the Azerbaijani Eurovision entry. On 10 April, Hüseynov performed during the Eurovision PreParty Riga, which was organised by OGAE Latvia and held at the Palladium in Riga, Latvia. Hüseynov performed "Hour of the Wolf" during the M1 programme Kívánságkosár in Hungary on 14 April, the CNN Türk programme Burada laf çok in Turkey on 15 April, the TV Limburg talk show studioTVL in Belgium on 20 April, and the ANT1 morning show To Proino Mou on 22 April. On 18 April, Hüseynov performed during the Eurovision in Concert event which was held at the Melkweg venue in Amsterdam, Netherlands and hosted by Cornald Maas and Edsilia Rombley. On 24 April, Hüseynov performed during the Eurovision Pre-Party, which was held at the Place de Paris Korston Concert Hall in Moscow, Russia. On 26 and 27 April, Hüseynov completed promotional activities in Georgia. Before leaving for the contest, Elnur Hüseynov held a farewell party in Istanbul, Turkey on 6 May and released a Turkish version of "Hour of the Wolf" along with a music video filmed in Istanbul.

== At Eurovision ==
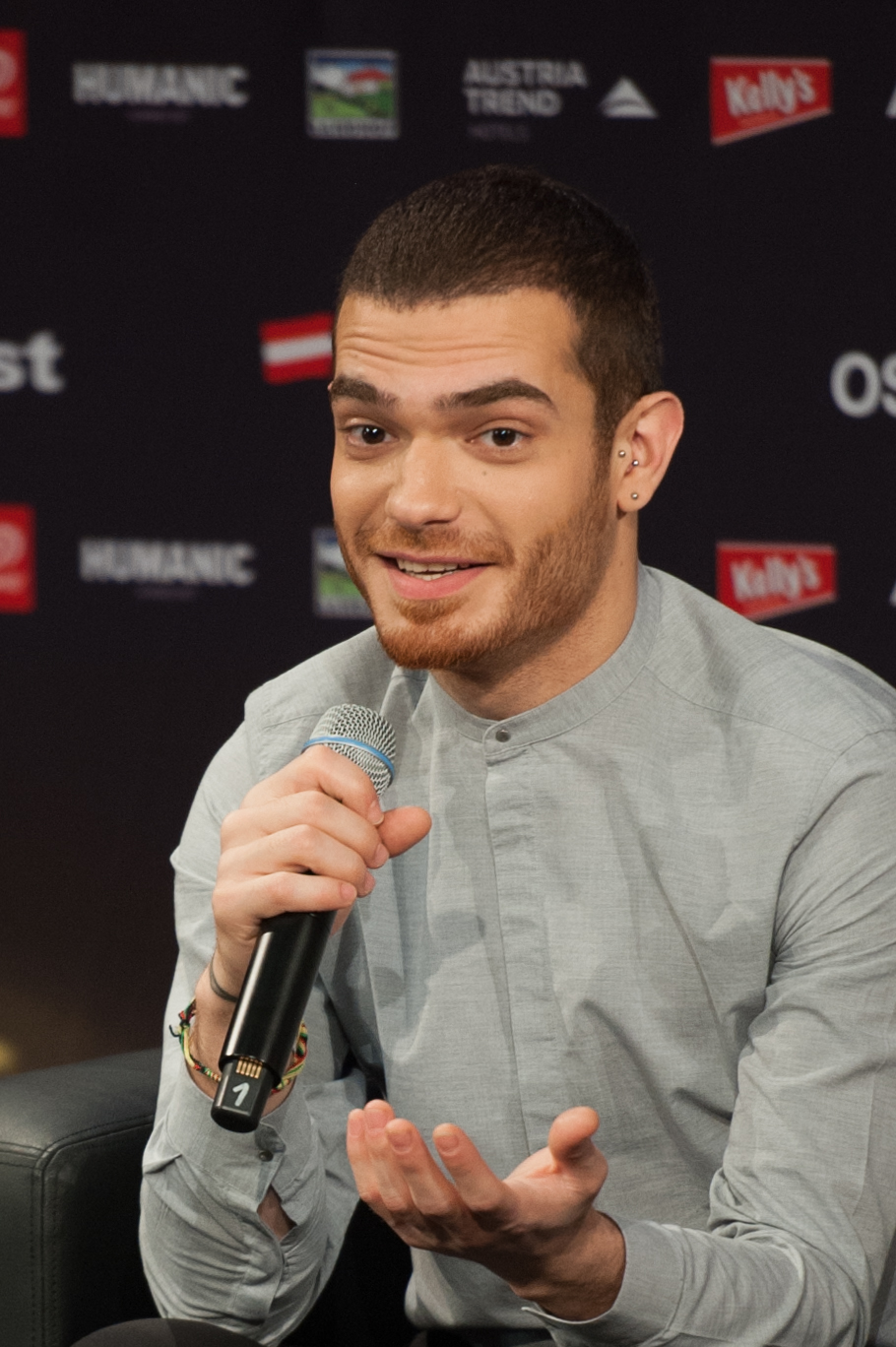
Elnur Hüseynov during a press meet and greet

According to Eurovision rules, all nations with the exceptions of the host country and the "Big Five" (France, Germany, Italy, Spain and the United Kingdom) are required to qualify from one of two semi-finals in order to compete for the final; the top ten countries from each semi-final progress to the final. In the 2015 contest, Australia also competed directly in the final as an invited guest nation. The European Broadcasting Union (EBU) split up the competing countries into five different pots based on voting patterns from previous contests, with countries with favourable voting histories put into the same pot. On 26 January 2015, a special allocation draw was held which placed each country into one of the two semi-finals, as well as which half of the show they would perform in. Azerbaijan was placed into the second semi-final, to be held on 21 May 2015, and was scheduled to perform in the second half of the show.

Once all the competing songs for the 2015 contest had been released, the running order for the semi-finals was decided by the shows' producers rather than through another draw, so that similar songs were not placed next to each other. Azerbaijan was set to perform in position 11, following the entry from Latvia and before the entry from Iceland.

The two semi-finals and final were broadcast in Azerbaijan on İTV and İTV Radio with commentary by Kamran Guliyev. The Azerbaijani spokesperson, who announced the Azerbaijani votes during the final, was Tural Asadov.

=== Semi-final ===
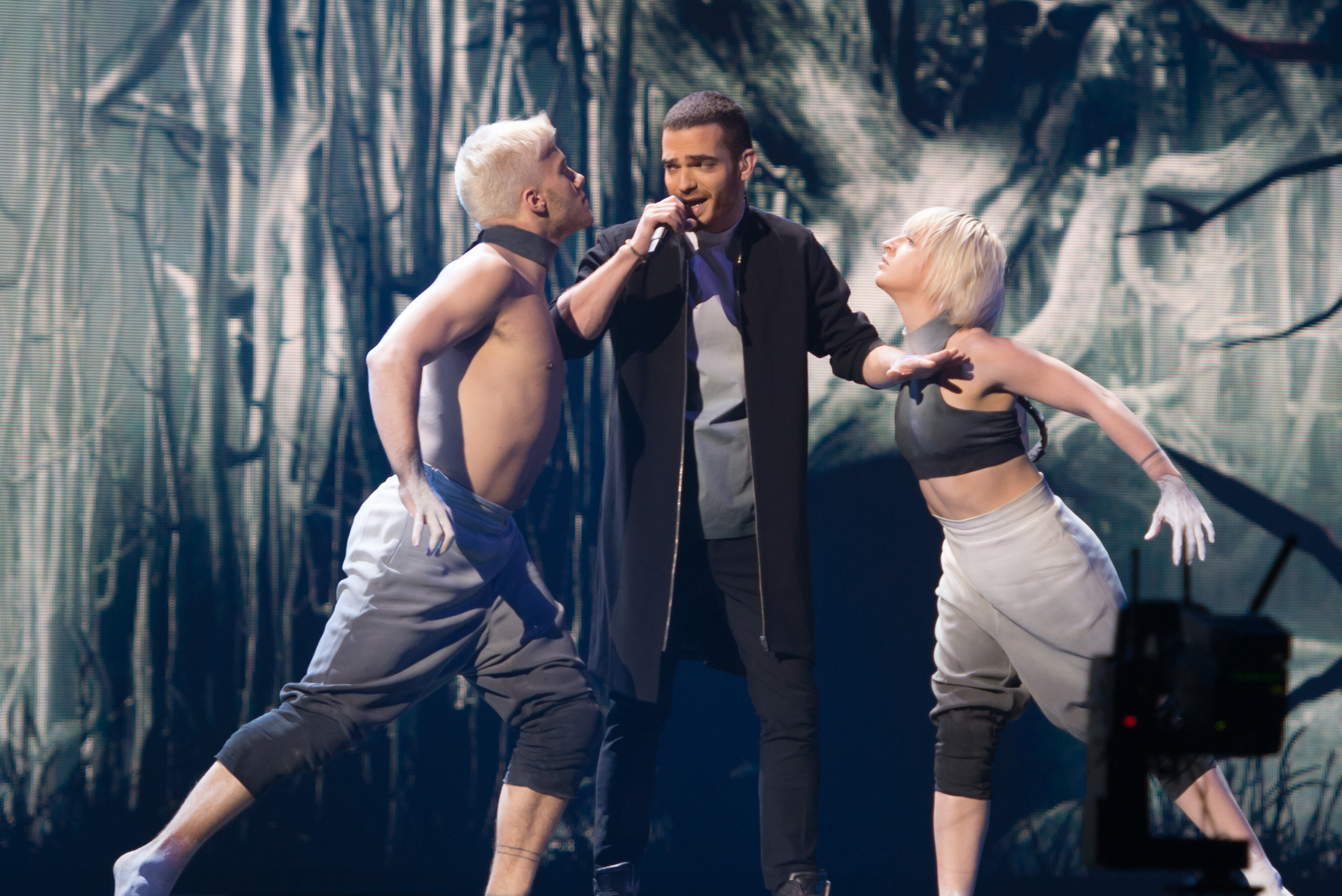
Elnur Hüseynov during a rehearsal before the second semi-final

Elnur Hüseynov took part in technical rehearsals on 14 and 16 May, followed by dress rehearsals on 20 and 21 May. This included the jury show on 20 May where the professional juries of each country watched and voted on the competing entries.

The Azerbaijani performance featured Elnur Hüseynov in a black costume joined by two dancers dressed in grey. Hüseynov and the dancers performed a routine choreographed by Ambra Succi that was intended to convey a struggle between two wolves (the dancers) with Hüseynov ending the conflict. The staging for the performance focused on dark colours with the LED screens displaying a mystic atmosphere with an arid forest, a full moon and wild nature. The two backing dancers that joined Hüseynov on stage were Lukas McFarlane and Julia Spiesser, while three off-stage backing vocalists were also part of the performance: Tamara Nivillac, Krysten Cummings and Nicklas Lif.

At the end of the show, Azerbaijan was announced as having finished in the top ten and subsequently qualifying for the grand final. It was later revealed that the Azerbaijan placed tenth in the semi-final, receiving a total of 53 points.

=== Final ===
Shortly after the second semi-final, a winner's press conference was held for the ten qualifying countries. As part of this press conference, the qualifying artists took part in a draw to determine which half of the grand final they would subsequently participate in. This draw was done in the order the countries were announced during the semi-final. Azerbaijan was drawn to compete in the second half. Following this draw, the shows' producers decided upon the running order of the final, as they had done for the semi-finals. Azerbaijan was subsequently placed to perform in position 24, following the entry from Georgia and before the entry from Russia.

Elnur Hüseynov once again took part in dress rehearsals on 22 and 23 May before the final, including the jury final where the professional juries cast their final votes before the live show. Hüseynov performed a repeat of his semi-final performance during the final on 23 May. At the conclusion of the voting, Azerbaijan placed twelfth with 49 points.

=== Voting ===
Voting during the three shows consisted of 50 percent public televoting and 50 percent from a jury deliberation. The jury consisted of five music industry professionals who were citizens of the country they represent, with their names published before the contest to ensure transparency. This jury was asked to judge each contestant based on: vocal capacity; the stage performance; the song's composition and originality; and the overall impression by the act. In addition, no member of a national jury could be related in any way to any of the competing acts in such a way that they cannot vote impartially and independently. The individual rankings of each jury member were released shortly after the grand final. In the second semi-final, Azerbaijan's vote was based on 100 percent jury voting, which was implemented due to either technical issues with the televoting or an insufficient number of votes.

Following the release of the full split voting by the EBU after the conclusion of the competition, it was revealed that Azerbaijan had placed fourteenth with both the public televote and the jury vote in the final. In the public vote, Azerbaijan scored 48 points, while with the jury vote, Azerbaijan scored 40 points. In the second semi-final, Azerbaijan placed eleventh with the public televote with 37 points and ninth with the jury vote, scoring 67 points.

Below is a breakdown of points awarded to Azerbaijan and awarded by Azerbaijan in the second semi-final and grand final of the contest, and the breakdown of the jury voting and televoting conducted during the two shows:

==== Points awarded to Azerbaijan ====
Points awarded to Azerbaijan (Semi-final 2)
Score	Country
12 points	
10 points	Czech Republic
8 points	Malta
7 points	Montenegro
6 points	Lithuania
5 points	Cyprus
4 points	Sweden
3 points	Israel; Poland; Portugal
2 points	Australia; Iceland
1 point	

Points awarded to Azerbaijan (Final)
Score	Country
12 points	Czech Republic
10 points	Georgia
8 points	Malta; Montenegro
7 points	
6 points	
5 points	
4 points	
3 points	Moldova; Romania; Russia
2 points	Lithuania
1 point	

==== Points awarded by Azerbaijan ====
Points awarded by Azerbaijan (Semi-final 2)
Score	Country
12 points	Slovenia
10 points	Montenegro
8 points	Israel
7 points	Lithuania
6 points	Latvia
5 points	Iceland
4 points	Sweden
3 points	Portugal
2 points	Ireland
1 point	Switzerland

Points awarded by Azerbaijan (Final)
Score	Country
12 points	Russia
10 points	Georgia
8 points	Italy
7 points	Israel
6 points	Sweden
5 points	Latvia
4 points	Estonia
3 points	Slovenia
2 points	Montenegro
1 point	Spain

==== Detailed voting results ====
The following members comprised the Azeri jury:

- Zumrud Dadashzade (jury chairperson) – musician and pedagogue, member of Azerbaijan Composers Union
- Tunzala Kahraman – jazz expert
- Fidan Haciyeva – opera singer
- Faig Aghayev – singer
- Samira Allahverdi – singer, choreographer

Detailed voting results from Azerbaijan (Semi-final 2)
R/O	Country	Z. Dadashzade	T. Kahraman	F. Haciyeva	F. Aghayev	S. Allahverdi	Jury Rank	Points
01	Lithuania	4	4	2	6	3	4	7
02	Ireland	8	9	8	10	9	9	2
03	San Marino	14	15	12	12	14	13	
04	Montenegro	3	1	3	2	5	2	10
05	Malta	12	16	13	15	13	14	
06	Norway	15	14	15	16	15	16	
07	Portugal	10	8	9	7	7	8	3
08	Czech Republic	13	10	14	11	10	11	
09	Israel	1	3	4	1	8	3	8
10	Latvia	6	2	7	4	2	5	6
11	Azerbaijan							
12	Iceland	7	7	5	5	4	6	5
13	Sweden	5	6	6	8	6	7	4
14	Switzerland	9	11	10	9	11	10	1
15	Cyprus	16	13	16	13	16	15	
16	Slovenia	2	5	1	3	1	1	12
17	Poland	11	12	11	14	12	12	

Detailed voting results from Azerbaijan (Final)
R/O	Country	Z. Dadashzade	T. Kahraman	F. Haciyeva	F. Aghayev	S. Allahverdi	Jury Rank	Televote Rank	Combined Rank	Points
01	Slovenia	5	3	4	6	2	4	13	8	3
02	France	22	21	22	21	23	22	25	25	
03	Israel	2	6	5	1	4	3	5	4	7
04	Estonia	12	10	9	9	15	11	6	7	4
05	United Kingdom	24	23	23	24	22	23	19	22	
06	Armenia	26	26	26	26	26	26	26	26	
07	Lithuania	8	9	10	8	7	8	18	12	
08	Serbia	13	12	13	12	10	12	22	18	
09	Norway	21	22	21	22	21	21	14	19	
10	Sweden	6	7	6	7	8	7	3	5	6
11	Cyprus	23	24	24	23	24	24	21	24	
12	Australia	17	19	19	15	19	18	9	14	
13	Belgium	20	17	20	19	18	19	8	13	
14	Austria	19	20	18	20	20	20	23	23	
15	Greece	18	18	17	17	17	17	15	16	
16	Montenegro	10	11	8	11	9	9	12	9	2
17	Germany	25	25	25	25	25	25	17	21	
18	Poland	15	16	15	18	16	16	16	17	
19	Latvia	7	1	7	3	3	5	7	6	5
20	Romania	11	14	12	14	11	13	24	20	
21	Spain	16	15	16	16	14	15	10	10	1
22	Hungary	9	8	11	10	13	10	20	15	
23	Georgia	1	2	3	4	5	2	4	2	10
24	Azerbaijan									
25	Russia	3	4	1	2	1	1	1	1	12
26	Albania	14	13	14	13	12	14	11	11	
27	Italy	4	5	2	5	6	6	2	3	8
