= Azerbaijani rock =

Music of Azerbaijan

Azerbaijani rock (Azerbaijani: Azərbaycan roku) is a wide variety of forms of rock music made in Azerbaijan or by artists of Azerbaijani descent.

== History ==
=== Soviet Era ===
Rock was greatly restricted for most of the period Azerbaijan was under Soviet rule, being viewed by the CPSU as a Western anti-socialist influence. Among the most recognized groups of the Soviet era were Coldünya, Yuxu, Eksulap and Khurramids.

==== 1960s–1970s ====
1960s was the period when Azerbaijani rock was formed. Leading bands of this period were namely Eskulap (1966), Khurramids (1969), Express-118, Pazavang and Uvet which were mainly playing soft rock and blues. Khurramids performed live in festival dedicated to 51st establishment of Azerbaijan State University with a cover version of "I can't get no" by Rolling Stones in 1970. Following first decade of Azerbaijani rock, 70s gave rise to jazz rock with ethnic elements. Cürbəcür was founded by Jahangir Garayev, elder brother of Abulfas Garayev in 1970. Other notable bands were Məşəl (Torch), Brevis (1971) and Üç Alov (Three Flames). However, main driving force were considered Experiment-OK (1967) and Ashiqlar (1973). Jazz fusion era ended with "ASU Physics faculty band" (1972) according to Hikmat Hajizadeh (former ambassador of Azerbaijan to Russia) who played solo guitars back then.

Meanwhile, in Sumgayit, Miraj and Rovesnik bands were active.

==== 1980s ====
The later 1970s were largely silent and few bands survived political restrictions. The early 1980s saw soft rock band Günel and Polad Bulbuloglu's emergence as Ashiqlar vocalist. The latter gained union-wide popularity and toured RSFSR and Mongolia, gave concerts in Afghanistan. Other successful band was Talisman which was a part of supergroup Gaya. Band played live in Moscow, during 12th World Festival of Youth and Students in 1985.

Later 80s saw emergence of many bands due to establishment of Baku Youth Modern Music Center. Weqibond was one of these bands founded by Ibrahim Emin who would later found Yuxu. Years after first festival was held in Baku on 1 May 1988 - "Rock Panorama".

"Rock Panorama 2" festival was held in 1989, which was larger than its predecessor. About 30 bands took part including Qrimsiz (Makeupless), Faust, Neysan, İz (Trail), Terminal, Reportaj, Charley ATL, Minaret, etc. Soft rock band Günel was renamed into Aksiya (Action).

=== Post-Soviet Era ===
==== 1990s ====
Following the collapse of the Soviet Union, the rock audience in Azerbaijan started slowly to grow and groups like Unformal gained popularity among local fans. Sumgayit was credited as the main regional driving force behind these rock bands of the 1990s, including Yuxu, Spark, Miraj, Mozalan, and Sirr. Other active bands were Industry, NemO, P.G.L.U. Project, Fatal Nation, Taj.

==== 2000s ====
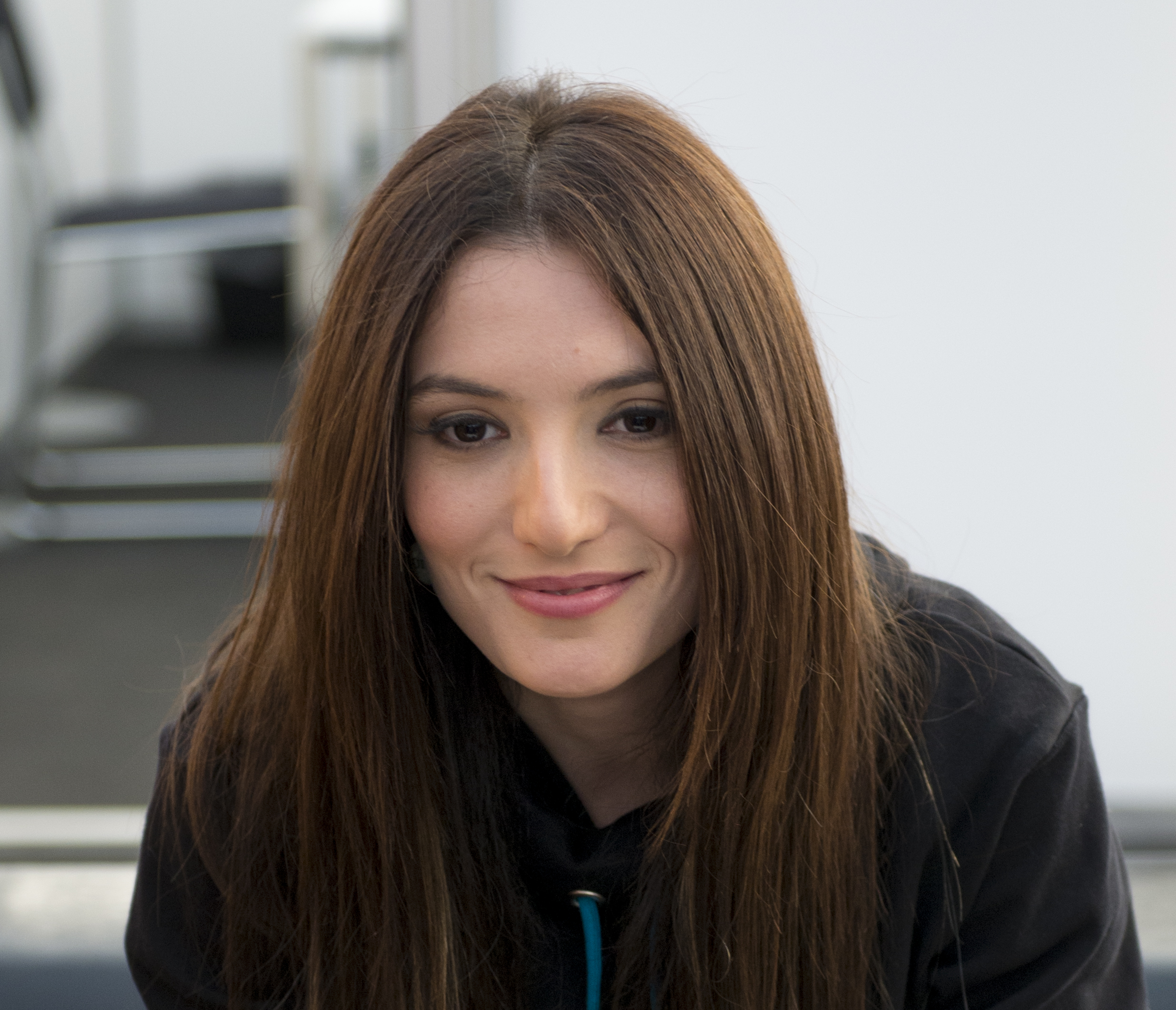
Dilara Kazimova of Unformal, which was considered one of the most successful emerging Azerbaijani bands of the early 2000s.

Being more connected to Western music and availability of instruments compared to Soviet Union, 2000s saw many bands being formed including 3.14. New bands like Ferrum, The Nails, Pro'n'Con, Mechanic Fist and numerous others were fast to rise, however most of them quickly dissolved after formation. Hard rock band Bəndə hailing from Sumgayit was founded in 2008.

==== 2010s ====
Azerbaijani rock scene gained momentum after 2010. New genres including heavy metal, metalcore and black metal received positive responses. Silence Lies Fear, Meridian, Sirat, Tengri, Vozmezdie, The Midnight, Orient Express were exclusively successful. Pagan black metal band Üör was founded in 2011. Sadnos which was founded by Sasha Goncharov is still one of active projects. Stoner bands including Lavatory Service and Pyraweed are also considered main influence in rock scene.

In 2014, Tuborg GreenFest was held in Baku. It was the largest rock festival in the country's history.
