= Safura Alizadeh =

Azerbaijani singer (born 1992)

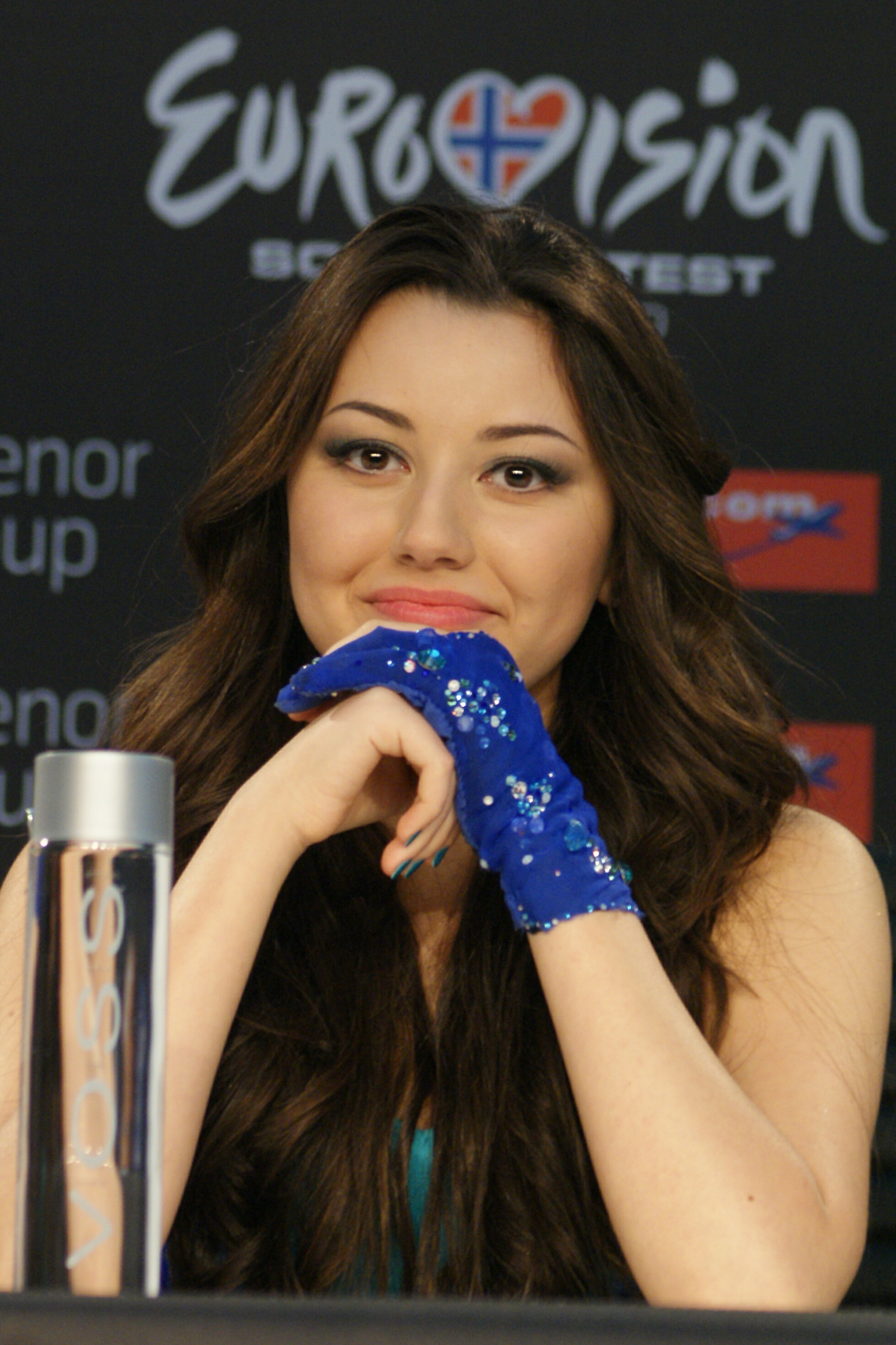

Background information
- Born: 20 September 1992 (age 33)
- Origin: Baku, Azerbaijan
- Genres: Pop
- Occupation: Singer
- Years active: 2009–present
- Labels: Sony, BIP, CAP, NETD, Safura
- Website: safura.com

Safura Alizadeh (Azerbaijani: Səfurə Əlizadə; born 20 September 1992) is an Azerbaijani pop singer. In 2009, she became the winner of the eighth season of Pop Idol. She represented Azerbaijan in the Eurovision Song Contest 2010 with the song "Drip Drop", finishing in fifth place.

== Early life and career ==
Safura's father is a professional painter and her mother is a pianist. Safura began singing when she was very young and made her first stage appearance at the age of 6. In the course of her career, she sang in children's bands "Sharg Ulduzlari" and "Bulbullar". Safura took up violin and piano lessons at the "Baku Musical School No2", but later also learned to play the saxophone. Safura graduated school No23 in Baku.

She became the winner of the national contest "Pop Idol" (season 8).

Safura attended the Azerbaijan State University of Culture and Arts, then she moved to Sweden.

== Eurovision Song Contest 2010 ==
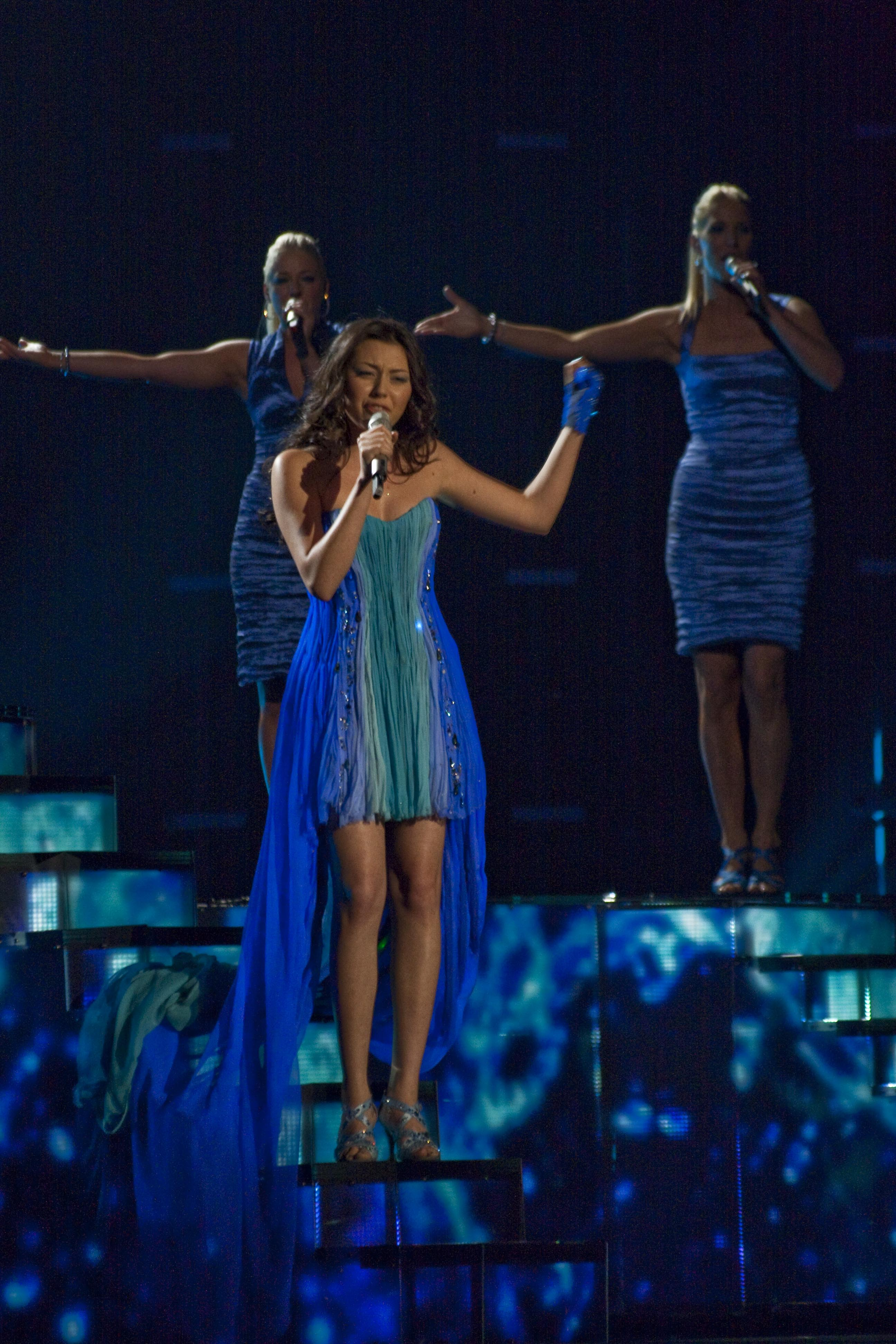
Alizadeh in Oslo, 2010

On 2 March 2010, Safura won the Azerbaijani national final as decided by the jury and represented Azerbaijan in the Eurovision Song Contest 2010, which was held in Oslo, Norway. Safura performed at the contest with the song "Drip Drop", written by Anders Bagge, Stefan Örn and Sandra Bjurman. Shortly after, she performed at the concert in Ukraine and exchanged wishes with Ukrainian performer Vasyl Lazarovych. The video for the song was directed by director Rupert Wainwright, and choreographed by JaQuel Knight. Knight also designed the choreography of Safura's stage performance in Oslo.

On 1 May 2010, Safura began her promotional tour, and visited Germany, the Netherlands, Belgium, Switzerland, Poland, Russia, Ukraine, and Sweden.

== After Eurovision ==
The singer performed in Bydgoszcz Hit Festival with the song Drip Drop. She was the official spokesperson of the Azeri voting in Eurovision Song Contest 2011, 2012 and 2025.

Safura has signed a five-year contract with the Swedish record company Zaphire. Her first album, titled It's My War, was released on 18 June 2010. Drip Drop was the first single released from It's My War. The second single to be released from It's My War was confirmed to be March On, which was released on 20 August.

Safura announced that she had terminated her contract with Euteria due to intolerable limitations that the company had placed on her, including limiting her trips to her home country and banning her from using online social networks. She noted the possibility of seeking a contract with another European company.

In 2019, Safura released her third single High On Your Love. On 5 August 2021, Safura released her second album titled Möcüze. On 25 November 2021, she released her third single L.O.V.E.

Safura joined the ruling New Azerbaijan Party in 2011.

== Discography ==
=== Albums ===
- 2010: It's My War
- 2021: Möcüze

=== Singles ===
Year	Single	Peak chart positions						Album
Year	Single	AUT	GER	SWE	NOR	BEL (FLA)	TUR	Album
2010	"Drip Drop"	41	26	15	40	38	21	It's My War
2010	"March On"	—	—	—	—	—	—	It's My War
2014	"Tonight"	—	—	—	—	—	—	Non-album singles
2020	"High on Your Love"	—	—	—	—	—	—	Non-album singles
2021	"L.O.V.E"	—	—	—	—	—	—	Non-album singles

== Personal life ==
On 5 July 2013, Safura married Farhad Aliyev, son of Azerbaijan's Minister of Industry and Energy of Azerbaijan Republic Natig Aliyev. Safura and her husband have three children: two sons born in 2014 and 2019 and a daughter born in 2017.

== See also ==
- Azerbaijani pop music
- Azerbaijani rock
- Azerbaijani hip hop

Awards and achievements
Preceded by Aysel and Arash with "Always"	Azerbaijan in the Eurovision Song Contest; 2010	Succeeded by Nigar and Eldar with "Running Scared"
