= Charley ATL =

Azerbaijani progressive rock band

- Origin: Baku, Azerbaijan SSR
- Genres: Progressive rock; Art rock
- Years active: 1987-1995
- Past members: See below

Charley ATL was an Azerbaijani progressive art rock band formed in 1987.

== History ==
Charley ATL was founded in 1987. Their only released album was "Dedicated to victims of Indian Cinema" in 1990. Their style were often compared to King Crimson, Dire Straits and Deep Purple by then in Azerbaijani rock magazine (samizdat) "Rokoko" which was founded itself by band member - Vahid Mustafayev (brother of Chingiz Mustafayev). Their major appearance on stage was during "Rokoko" rock music festival which took place in September, 1991 in Green Theatre. Their first and only music video "Körpə" (Baby) was released in 1993 and was circulated in ANS TV till 1998. Whilst most of bands then sang in Russian, Charley ATL was singing in Azerbaijani. They style derived from folk as well, tar was used as an instrument. Lyrics were heavily sarcastic. Band was eventually split up in 1995 and most of their members left to work in ANS TV.

== Present ==
In May 2017, former band members Stas Kalashnikov, Pavel Bulak, Rafig Velimetov and other musicians including Teymur Nadir, Yashar Bakhish and Rasim Muzaffarli rearranged and shot a video clip for "Gözəl çöllər" (Beautiful Steppes) on the occasion of Gunduz 'Bakili' Suleymanov's 50th birthday.

== Members ==
Name	Instruments
Gunduz 'Bakili' Suleymanov	Vocals and rhythm guitars
Stanislav 'Stas' Kalashnikov	Bass guitar
Isgandar Alasgerov	Drums
Pavel Bulak	Programming and keyboard
Gennady Qasimov	Drums
Edward Ten	Guitars
Andron	Bass guitar
Vahid 'Nakhish' Mustafayev	Saxophone and lyrics
Rafig Velimetov	Guitars
Vadim 'Styopa' Kocherev	Saxophone

== Aftermath ==
- Pavel Bulak – moved to Moscow and began working on his own project SadFat.
- Stas Kalashnikov – moved to Moscow and founded KalashnikovBand in 2005.
- Isgandar Alasgerov – joined to band OZAN and Rast & HezzBand.

== Discography ==
"Dedicated to victims of Indian Cinema" - LP - Stereo - 1990
#	Name	English	Length
1	Freyd dünyası	Freud world	04:05
2	Göyçaylı	Goychayli	04:54
3	Gözəl çöllər	Beautiful steppes	06:10
4	Şah İsmayıl	Shah Ismail	04:20
5	Anqola camaatı	People of Angola	06:40
6	Good Morning Children		03:31
7	Körpə	Baby	05:17
8	Vətənpərvər Əlisəfər	Patriot Alisafar	03:31
9	Dülgər ağa	Carpenter agha	06:14
10	Əlvida	Farewell	05:41
11	The Tree		04:26
