= Real TV (Azerbaijani TV channel) =

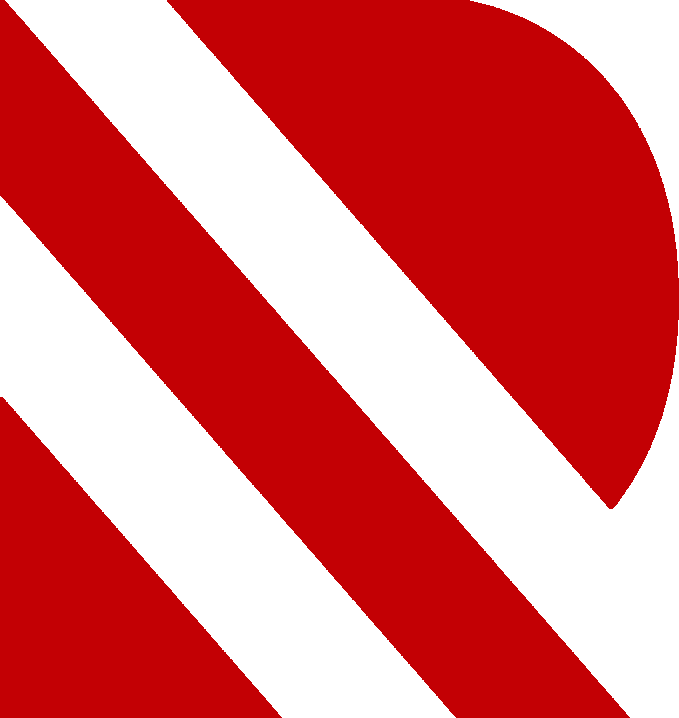
- Type: Commercial television
- Country: Azerbaijan
- Broadcast area: Nationwide
- Headquarters: Narimanov, Baku

Programming
- Language: Azerbaijani
- Picture format: 1080i HDTV

Ownership
- Owner: REAL Analysis Information Cenfer
- Key people: Mirshahin Agayev (director general)

History
- Launched: 15 March 2018; 7 years ago

Links
- Website: www.realtv.az

Real TV is an Azerbaijani national terrestrial news-oriented television channel founded by Mirshahin Agayev, who is the co-founder of now-defunct ANS TV. It was launched on 15 March 2018 and is owned by Real Analysis Information Center. Real TV is headquartered in the Narimanov raion of Baku. The channel is considered to be the successor of ANS TV due to the number of similarities, although a Baku State University professor assured that it is a different network altogether.

== History ==
Real TV began broadcasting initially as an internet television channel on 28 February 2018. The National Television and Radio Council granted Real Analysis Information Center an indefinite license to broadcast the television station via satellite on 5 March 2018. It commenced test broadcasts on the same day, with many former employees of the defunct ANS TV joining the channel. It was officially launched on 15 March 2018. Real TV initially broadcast for 19 hours a day, but was later converted into a 24-hour channel on 17 September 2018.

The National Television and Radio Council later granted Real TV an indefinite license to broadcast terrestrially on 23 April 2019 after they won a competition which decided the 48th terrestrial television channel overall and the 37th to broadcast in HD. It commenced terrestrial broadcasts on 10 May. Real TV commenced high-definition broadcasts on 28 January 2022.

== Programming ==
The programming structure is said to heavily resemble ANS TV, as its reporting style, as well as the set design, is considered to be the very similar. The channel primarily broadcasts news programming, which is said to be strongly pro-government.
