= Aysel Teymurzadeh =

Azerbaijani singer (born 1989)

Aysel Teymurzadeh Aysel Teymurzadə
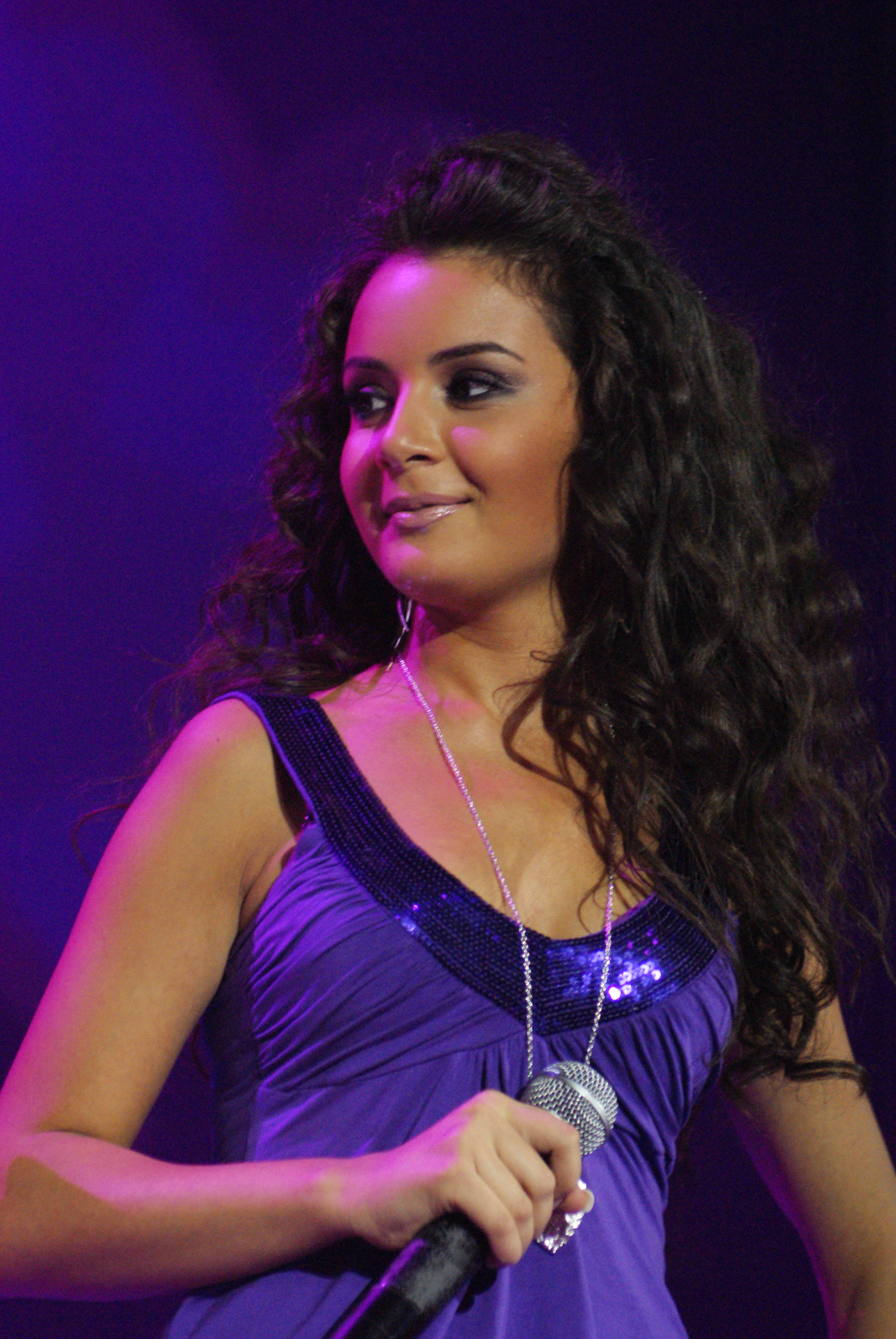
- AySel in 2009

Background information
- Also known as: AySel
- Born: April 25, 1989 (age 37); Baku, Soviet Azerbaijan
- Origin: Baku, Azerbaijan
- Genres: Pop, R&B
- Occupations: Singer, actress, photomodel
- Years active: 2005–2012
- Labels: Warner Music, Sony BMG

Aysel Teymurzadeh (Azerbaijani: Aysel Teymurzadə; born 25 April 1989 in Baku, Soviet Union) is an Azerbaijani pop and R&B singer. She and Arash represented Azerbaijan in the Eurovision Song Contest 2009 with the song "Always", finishing third.

== Biography ==
Aysel was born in the Azerbaijani capital Baku, the youngest of the three daughters of a journalist and university professor. She is a descendant of the nineteenth-century Azerbaijani author and journalist Hasan bey Zardabi. Her maternal grandmother was half-Russian-half-Ukrainian. Aysel started to sing at the age of four, and the piano became her passion since childhood.

Aysel graduated from the Intellect Lyceum in Baku and attended Texas High School (Texarkana, Texas) in 2005–2006. Within days of her arrival in the United States, she signed up for the local choir and began training for young vocalists competitions. While in the U.S., Aysel won three gold medals at contests held at Southern Arkansas University and at the University of Texas at Austin. In 2005, she participated in Season 4 of the national song contest Yeni Ulduz ("New Star"). As of January 2009, Teymurzadeh was majoring in International Relations at the Azerbaijan University of Languages.

== Eurovision ==
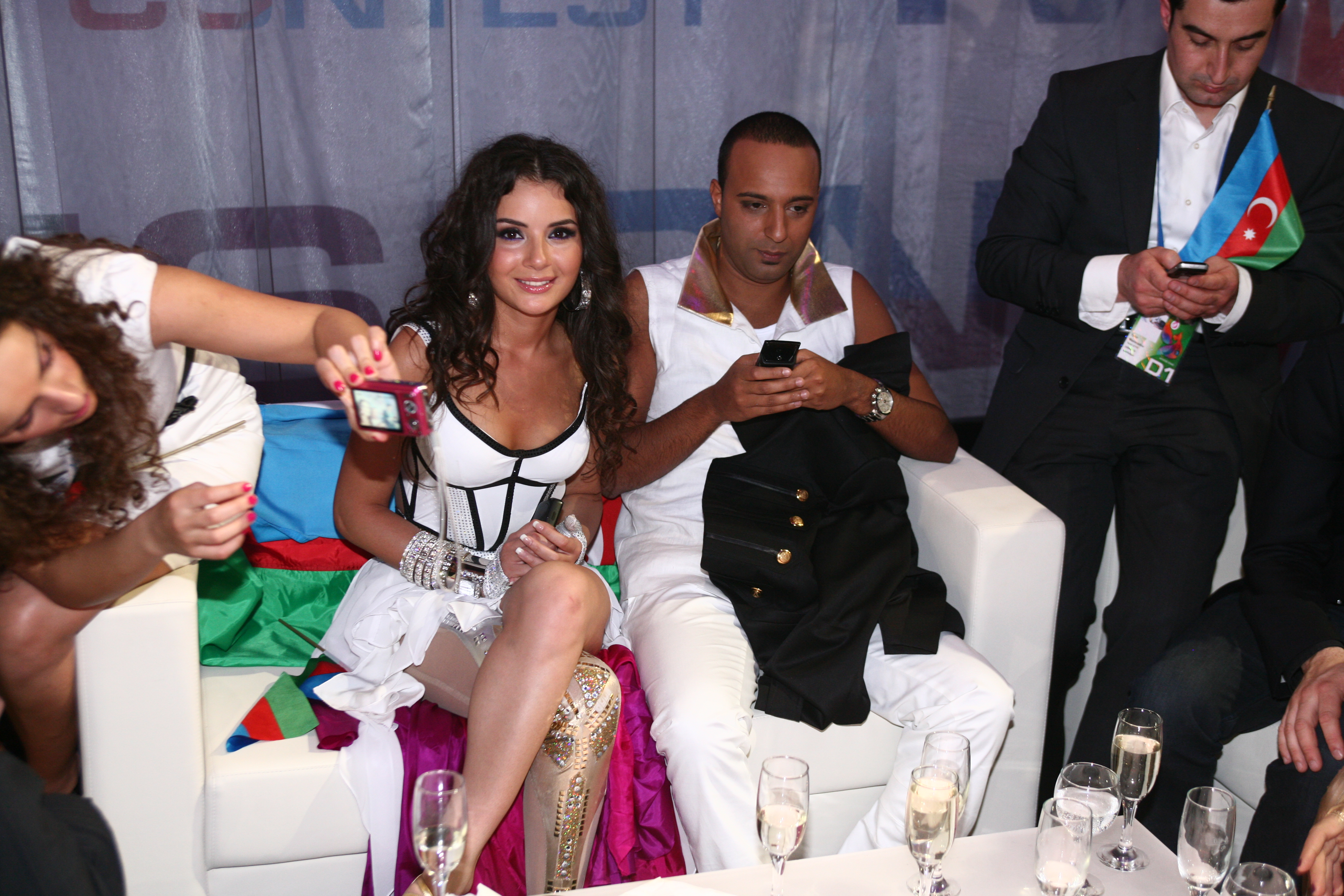
Aysel with Arash in the green room during the Eurovision Song Contest 2009

In January 2009, Teymurzadeh was selected internally by İTV to represent Azerbaijan in the Eurovision Song Contest 2009 in Moscow, Russia along with Iranian singer Arash with the song "Always". Aysel became the first female singer to represent the country at the Eurovision Song Contest. On May 16, 2009, Aysel Teymurzadeh and Arash finished third with 207 points, among the 25 performers that qualified for the Eurovision grand final.

Aysel together with Arash became the winner of the 4th Annual ESC Radio Awards in the category of the Best Group.

== After Eurovision ==
On May 28, Teymurzadeh announced going on a European tour with Arash, involving concerts in countries such as Sweden, Greece and Russia. Upon return she announced that together with Arash and his team she is working on an album, which will be released by Sony BMG and Warner Music. The date of release is unknown.

She starred in a high-profile TV commercial for Danone yogurts, which was broadcast on Azerbaijani and Georgian TV channels.

In 2012, Aysel Teymurzadeh was among five musicians from Azerbaijan chosen as the jury in the Danish national selection of the 2012 Eurovision contestant.

She was the spokesperson for the Azerbaijani jury at the Eurovision Song Contest 2024.

== Personal life ==
In 2012, Teymurzadeh married Murad Adigozalov, 39, director of the Azerbaijan State Philharmonic Society and divorced father of two children. According to some sources, her plan after marriage was to leave the big stage and only perform at official events. The couple has three children: two sons born in 2012 and 2016, and a daughter born in 2014.

== Discography ==
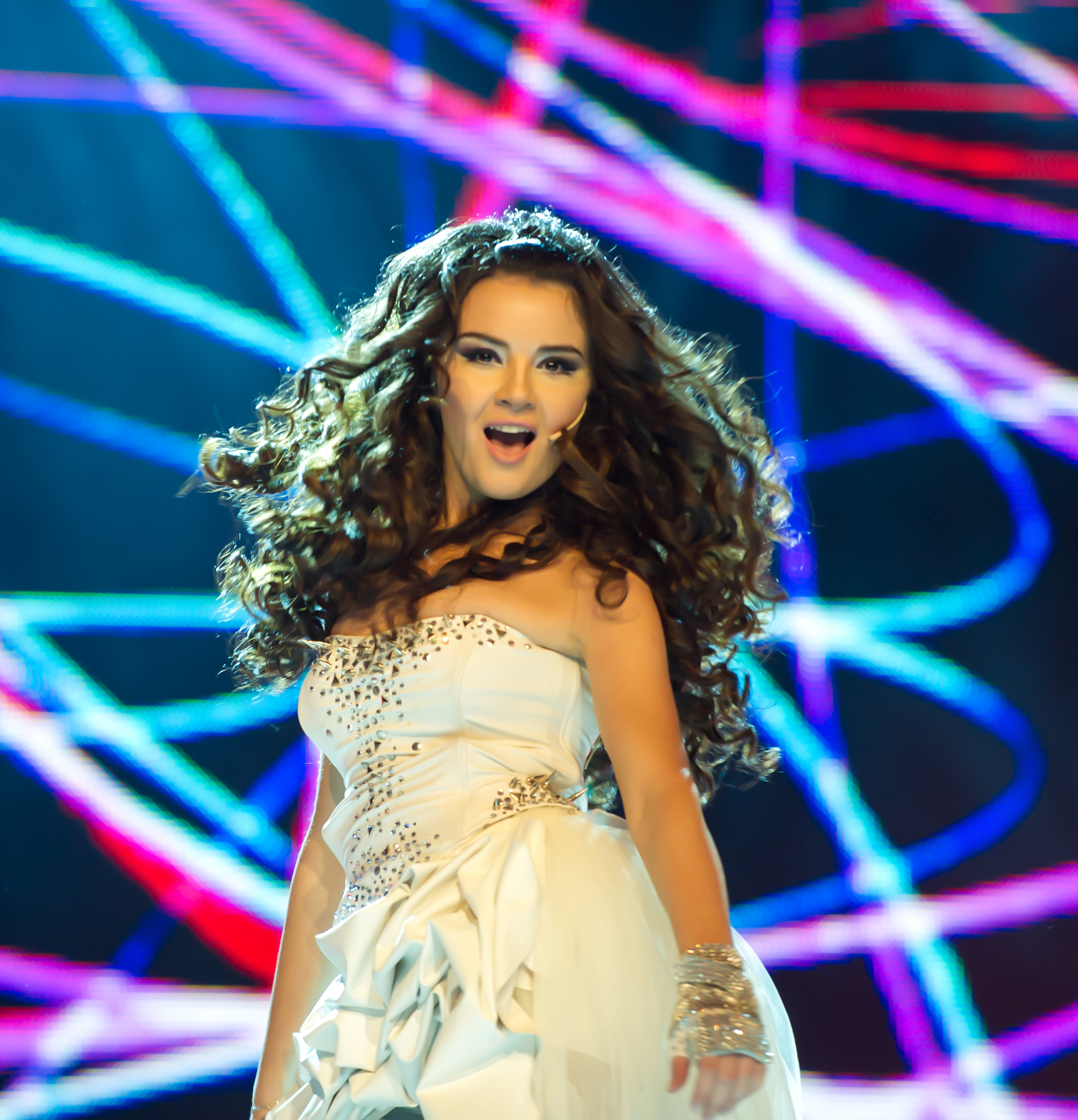
Aysel Teymurzadeh in 2012

=== Singles ===
- 2009 — "Always"
- 2010 — "Fallin'"
- 2010 — "Azerbaijan"
- 2010 — "Yanaram" (Azeri-language version of "Fallin'")
- 2010 — "Don't Let the Morning Come"
- 2010 — "San"
- 2011 — "Tonight"

=== Charts ===
Year	Single	Charts												Album
Year	Single	UK	EUR	TUR	GRE	SWE	NOR	GER	SUI	CZE	SLK	RUS	UKR	Album
2009	"Always"	137	92	11	2	3	18	96	98	40	47	75	4	TBA

== See also ==
- Azerbaijan in the Eurovision Song Contest
- Azerbaijan in the Eurovision Song Contest 2009

Awards and achievements
Preceded by Elnur & Samir with "Day After Day"	Azerbaijan in the Eurovision Song Contest (with Arash); 2009	Succeeded by Safura with "Drip Drop"
