= March On =

March On may refer to:

== Songs ==
- "March On!", song of the British Blue Shirts 1931, lyrics by Commander Oliver Locker-Lampson, music from the 1929 film High Treason
- March On! (You Fighting Sycamores), official school fight song of Indiana State University. 1939
- "March On", song by Good Charlotte from their 2007 album Good Morning Revival
- "March On", song by Safura from It's My War
- "March On, Bahamaland", the national anthem of the Bahamas

== Other ==
- March On (organization), 501(c)(4) organization in the United States that grew out of the 2017 Women's March
- March On! The Day My Brother Martin Changed the World, the 2009 winner of the Carnegie Medal for Excellence in Children's Video
