= Javadzadeh =

Javadzadeh (Azerbaijani: Cavadzadə) is an Azerbaijani surname. Notable people with the surname include:

- Nesrin Javadzadeh (born 1982), Turkish actress of Azeri origin
- Samir Javadzadeh (born 1980), Azerbaijani pop singer
