= Mammad Sadig Aliyev's trading office building =

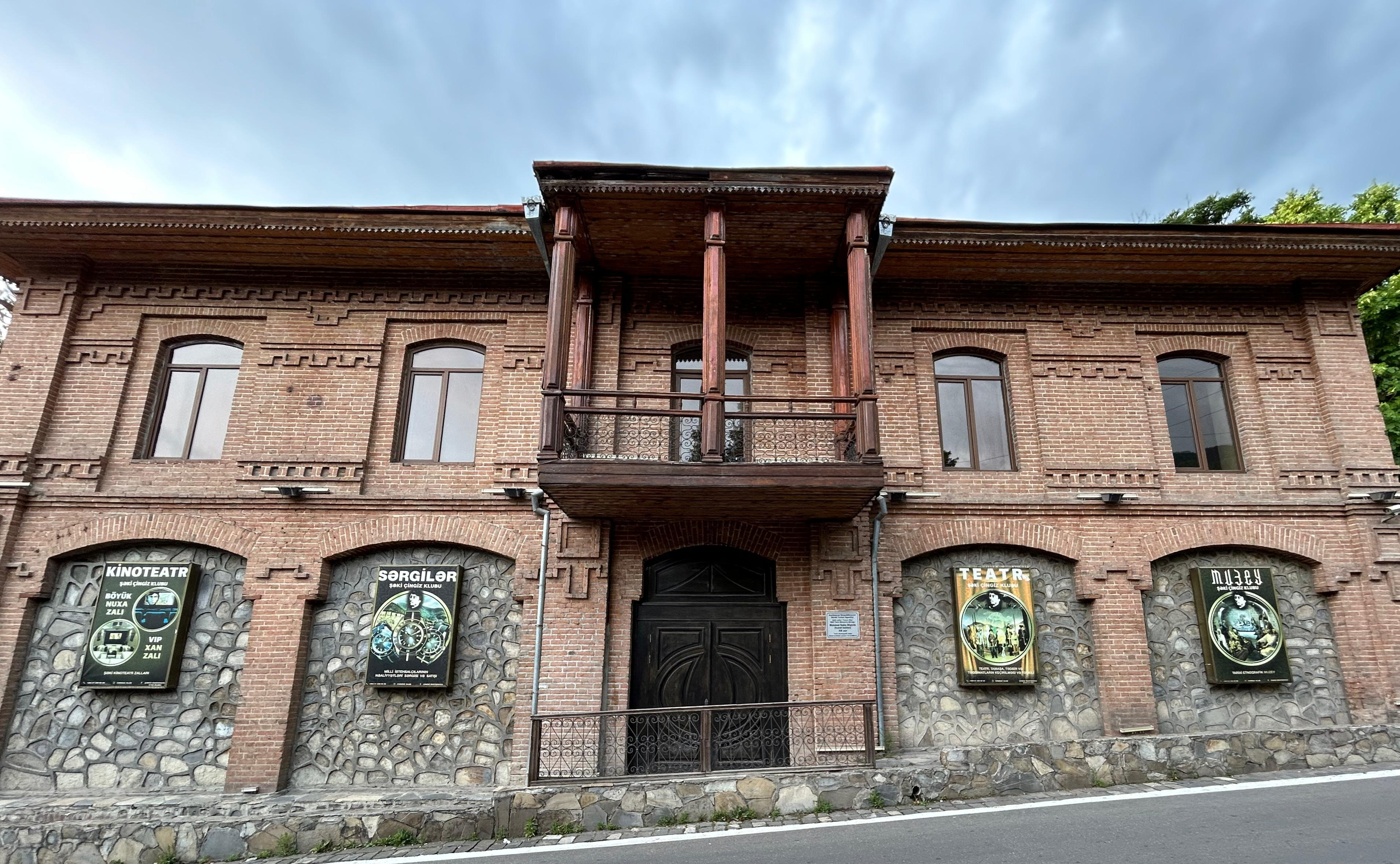
- Location: Mirza Fatali Akhundzadeh Avenue, 183
- Coordinates: 41°12′02″N 47°11′33″E
- Area: Shaki, Azerbaijan
- Built: 1913

Mammad Sadig Aliyev's trading office building or the Club Named After Chingiz Mustafayev is a historical and architectural monument from the 19th century located in the city of Shaki.

The building was included in the list of immovable historical and cultural monuments of local significance by Decision No. 338 of the Cabinet of Azerbaijan dated November 3, 2021.

== About ==
The building was constructed in 1913 by Mammad Sadiq Aliyev, a merchant engaged in sericulture. The three-story building, which functioned as a trade office, was built using river stone and baked brick.

After the Soviet occupation, a cinema operated in the building.

After Azerbaijan regained its independence, the Teachers' House operated in the building. In 2006, the building was renovated at the initiative of the Chingiz Mustafayev Foundation and the "VMF" company, and a club named after National Hero of Azerbaijan Chingiz Mustafayev began operating there. The building houses a cinema hall, children's theater, art gallery, and museum. In 2019, the cinema hall in the building underwent major renovation, and a cinema began operating there.

The building was included in the list of immovable historical and cultural monuments of local significance by Decision No. 338 of the Cabinet of Azerbaijan dated November 3, 2021.
