= ANS Radio =

Azerbaijani radio station

ANS Radio or ANS ChM (pronounced [ɑ.enˈes tʃeˈem]) was a private news and music radio station located in Baku, Azerbaijan, which broadcasts on the 102 frequency. The station also streams content over the Internet for free. ANS ChM was one of the first private and independent FM radio broadcasting service in the Caucasus and Central Asia regions when it was established in May 1994, and the station itself claims to be the first. The station currently broadcasts a mix of music, entertainment, and news.

ANS ChM is a component part of the Azerbaijan's largest independent TV and radio broadcaster ANS. The station was named after journalist and national hero of Azerbaijan Chingiz Mustafayev, who was killed in Nagorno-Karabakh war while filming for ANS, as reflected by the "ChM" in its title. ANS's founder and president is Vahid Mustafayev.

Radio as a medium is secondary to television in Azerbaijan, and ANS ChM functions as an affiliate to ANS TV, as is true for other private radio stations in the country that are all affiliates of a television station. ANS ChM has periodically been subject to closure by the State authorities, although the Government has claimed that the non-renewal of its license was due to the violation of certain communications laws.

It was finally closed down on 18 July 2016 together with ANS TV.

== See also ==
- ANS TV
