= Chingiz Mustafayev =

Chingiz Mustafayev may refer to:

- Chingiz Mustafayev (journalist)
- Chingiz Mustafayev (singer)
