= Vahid Mustafayev =

Azerbaijani businessman, journalist and filmmaker

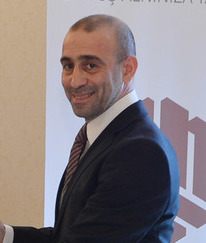
- Born: Vahid Fuad oglu Mustafayev; 4 September 1968 (age 57); Baku, Azerbaijani SSR, Soviet Union
- Other name: Vahid Nakhysh
- Occupations: Journalist, director
- Relatives: Chingiz Mustafayev (brother); Fuad Chingiz oglu Mustafayev (nephew)

Vahid Fuad oglu Mustafayev (Azerbaijani: Vahid Fuad oğlu Mustafayev, Ваһид Фуад оғлу Мустафајев, born 4 September 1968) is an Azerbaijani journalist and filmmaker. He is a president of ANS Group of Companies and was a co-founder and President of ANS Independent Broadcast Company in Azerbaijan before it was closed in 2016. Starting his career in the early 1990s, Mustafayev quickly made his way up due to his business skills. He created several films about the Nagorno-Karabakh conflict events.

He was awarded with the "Progress" medal for his role in the development of television in Azerbaijan.

== Filmography ==
- Bloody January (writer)-2015
- Aghabayovlar (TV series)-2012
- Xoca (written by)-2012
- Yaddash (as Vahid Nakhish)-2010
- Bulaqistan (TV movie)-2009
- Sechilan 2008
- Khazarin sahilinda (music video for the Yukhu song) - 1991
