= Minaret (band) =

Azerbaijani rock band

Minaret Minarə
- Origin: Baku, Azerbaijan SSR
- Genre: Progressive rock
- Years active: 1981-1991
- Past members: Otar Jalilov; Pavel Bulak; Nazim Hasanov; Vadim Syrykh; Arnold Ayriyan; Stas Kalashnikov; Dmitry Polovinkin; Elmar Qochabeyov

Minaret (Azerbaijani: Minarə) was an early Azerbaijani rock band founded by three classmates - Otar Jalilov, Pavel Bulak and Nazim Hasanov in 1981.

== History ==
Founding members were recently accepted to Azerbaijan Polytechnical Institute, it was there they agreed to create the band in 1981. Name 'Minaret' chosen by Otar Jalilov. Bassist Vadim Syrykh soon joined the band. Despite being university students now, they were practicing in their older school No.175. They initially played songs written by other Soviet composers. Otar Jalilov and Pavel Bulak were mainly influenced by Pink Floyd, Yes, Argent and Genesis. After collapse of Soviet Union, Minaret began to compose their own songs. They played live in rock festivals in Baku, such as Rock Panorama 88', Rock Panorama 89', Baku Autumn and so on. "Kino", "Scottish Elegy", "Number", "Shy Hope" were their main tracks played live.

Band decided to merge with another Baku rock band - Ikar in 1989, but political circumstances aborted the plan. Band itself was split up in 1991.

== Members ==
Founding members were Otar Jalilov (guitars), Pavel Bulak (vocals and keyboard), Nazim Hasanov (drums). Soon bassist Vadim Syrykh joined the band, however he was replaced by Arnold Ayriyan, Dmitry Polovinkin, Jacob and Stas Kalashnikov by time. Nazim Hasanov was replaced by Elmar Gochabayev in last sessions of band. Pavel Bulak and Stas Kalashnikov were also members of Charley ATL.

== Discography ==
Band recorded several songs, namely "Kino", "Scottish Elegy", "Number", "Shy Hope", "Perky Rock-n-Roll" and "Viva Vivaldi". However, Pavel Bulak released remastered versions of "Kino" and "Viva Vivaldi" on his SoundCloud channel. "Kino" was renamed to "Moebius Film" and both songs were released under Pavel Bulak's new project SadFat.
