= Elnur Hüseynov =

Azerbaijani singer (born 1987)

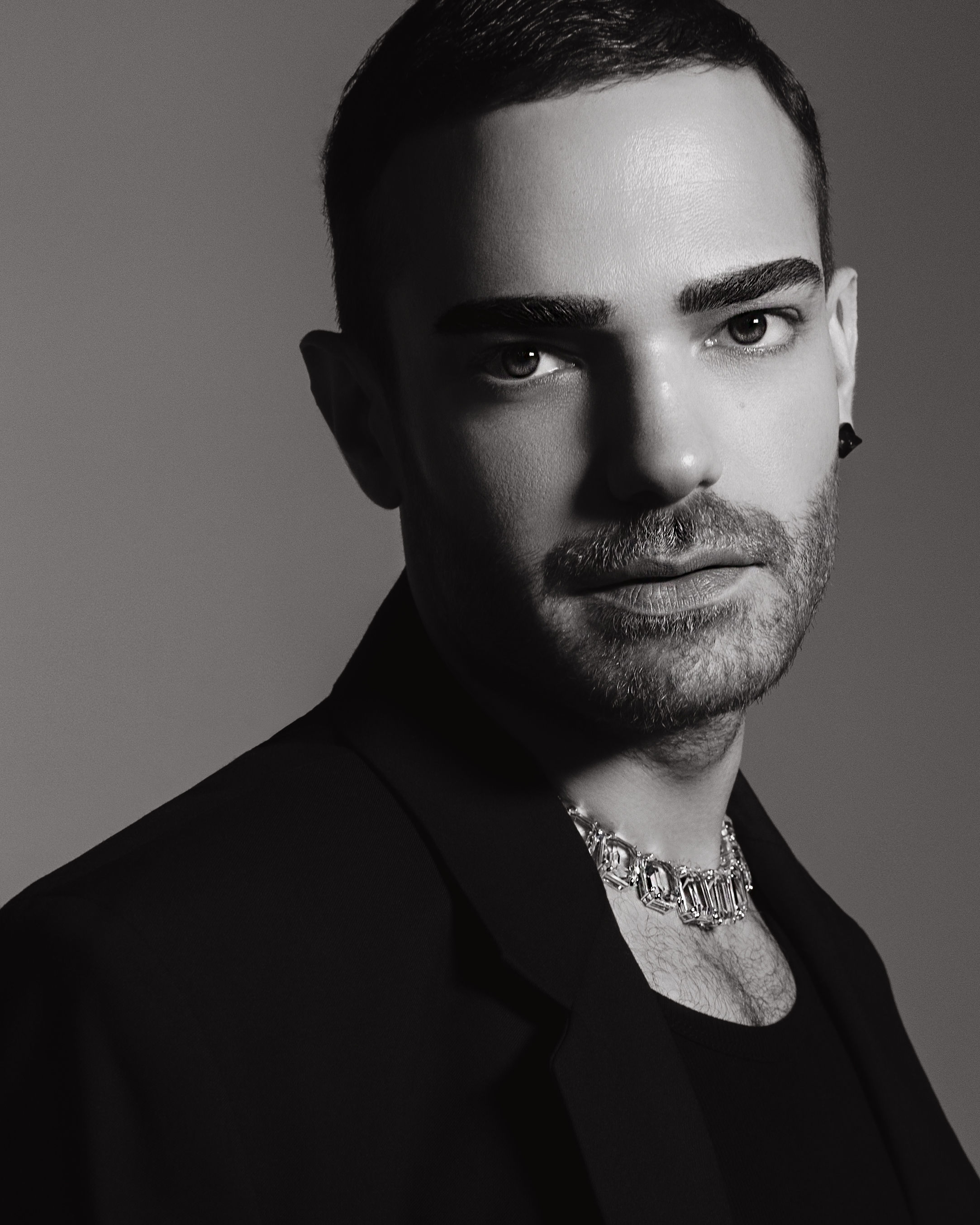
- Elnur Hüseynov in 2024

Background information
- Also known as: Elnur Hussein
- Born: 3 March 1987 (age 39); Ashgabat, Turkmen SSR, USSR
- Origin: Baku, Azerbaijan
- Genres: Pop; Operatic pop; Soul
- Occupation: Singer
- Instrument: Vocals
- Years active: 2003–present
- Label: BEAT Music
- Website: http://elnurhussein.com

Elnur Hüseynov (born 3 March 1987), also known as Elnur Hussein, is an Azerbaijani singer. He was the first Azerbaijan's representative to perform "Day After Day" at the Eurovision Song Contest 2008 alongside Samir Javadzadeh as duo Elnur and Samir. In 2015, he won the fourth season of The Voice of Turkey and represented Azerbaijan in the Eurovision Song Contest 2015 with the song "Hour of the Wolf".

== Career ==
Elnur Hüseynov was born in Ashgabat, Turkmenistan, to ethnic Azeri parents. His father was a military serviceman and his mother specializes in music theory. At age five, Elnur was admitted to a music school where he was trained as a piano player. In 1999, the family moved to Baku, Azerbaijan, where Elnur studied at a medical school and graduated with a degree in dentistry. In 2004, he graduated from the Asaf Zeynally Music College and took up hairstylist courses. He worked shortly at the Azerbaijan State Academic Opera and Ballet Theatre and with the choir group of the Azerbaijan State Philharmonic Society, in addition to singing in a church choir.

In 2003, he received first prize in the musical competition Sing Your Song aired on Azerbaijan's Lider TV.

=== Eurovision Song Contest 2008 ===
Elnur Hüseynov and Samir Javadzadeh were selected to represent Azerbaijan at the Eurovision Song Contest 2008, marking the country's debut in this song contest. Identified as the duo Elnur and Samir, together they sang "Day After Day". They were placed eighth in the finals. Following the contest, the duo split.

=== Further career moves ===
In December 2009, Elnur Hüseynov announced his intention to move permanently to Ukraine to further pursue his musical career. In June 2010, Elnur Hüseynov performed the part of Phoebus in the musical Notre-Dame de Paris, which was staged in Heydar Aliyev Palace.

In October 2010, he submitted an application to represent Azerbaijan at the Eurovision Song Contest 2011 but did not compete in the semifinals, with the exception of making a cameo appearance in one of the performances of the semifinalist Diana Hajiyeva.

Elnur Hüseynov later performed in the Azerbaijan State Philharmonic Hall.

=== O Ses Türkiye ===
In 2014, Huseynov, while on a visit to Istanbul applied to take part in season 4 of O Ses Türkiye, the Turkish version of The Voice. During the blind auditions, and on the 19th session broadcast on 1 December 2014 broadcast on the Turkish station TV8, singing "Latch" from the British garage-house duo Disclosure featuring vocals from Sam Smith. All four judges turned their chairs. Upon insistence of the judges and the public, he also performed on his audition five additional traditional and pop tunes, including "Sweet Dreams (Are Made of This)" from Eurythmics and "Aşk" from Sertab Erener. Judge Gökhan Özoğuz joined on stage to sing with the contestant in his final audition rendition. With rave comments and comments from all judges, he opted to be on judge Ebru Gündeş's team.

The strong favourite throughout the season, on 18 February 2015, Elnur Hüseynov was declared the winner of the O Ses Türkiye season, with Kaya Aslantepe as runner-up.

His performances during the season:

- 1 December 2014: Blind audition: "Latch". All four judges turned chairs. In Team Ebru Gündeş
- 30 December 2014: Duel round: "Stayin' Alive" against Ümit Ortaç. Safe
- 21 January 2015: One on One round: "Golden Eye" against Şermin Özlem Turhan. Safe
- 4 February 2015: Cross matches: "Get Lucky" against Seda Yiyin. Next round by score 56–44
- 11 February 2015: Live show 1: ""Exogenesis Symphony Part 1" against Sarper Arda Akkaya and Ceyda Tezemir. Won by public vote and in Final 8
- 17 February 2015: Quarter Finals – first song: "Yalgızam" (in Final 6)
- 17 February 2015: Semi Finals – second song: "Vur Yüreğim" (in Final 4)
- 18 February 2015: Finals (four contestants)
  - First part: "O Sole Mio" & "Aşk" – In Final 3 – Zeo Jaweed of Team Hadise eliminated
  - Second part: "Latch" – In Final 2 – Emrah Güllü of Team Gökhan eliminated
  - Third part: "Latch" – Season Winner – Kaya Aslantepe of Team Gökhan runner-up

=== Eurovision Song Contest 2015 ===
Elnur Hüseynov represented Azerbaijan for a second time in the Eurovision Song Contest 2015 with the song "Hour of the Wolf". He finished in 12th place in the final.

== See also ==
- Azerbaijan in the Eurovision Song Contest
- Azerbaijan in the Eurovision Song Contest 2008
- Azerbaijan in the Eurovision Song Contest 2015

Awards and achievements
Preceded by none (Debut entry)	Azerbaijan in the Eurovision Song Contest; 2008 (with Samir)	Succeeded by AySel & Arash with "Always"
Preceded by Hasan Doğru	The Voice of Turkey winner 2015	Succeeded by Emre Sertkaya
Preceded by Dilara Kazimova with "Start a Fire"	Azerbaijan in the Eurovision Song Contest; 2015	Succeeded by Samra with "Miracle"
