= Dilara Kazimova =

Azerbaijani singer and actress (born 1984)

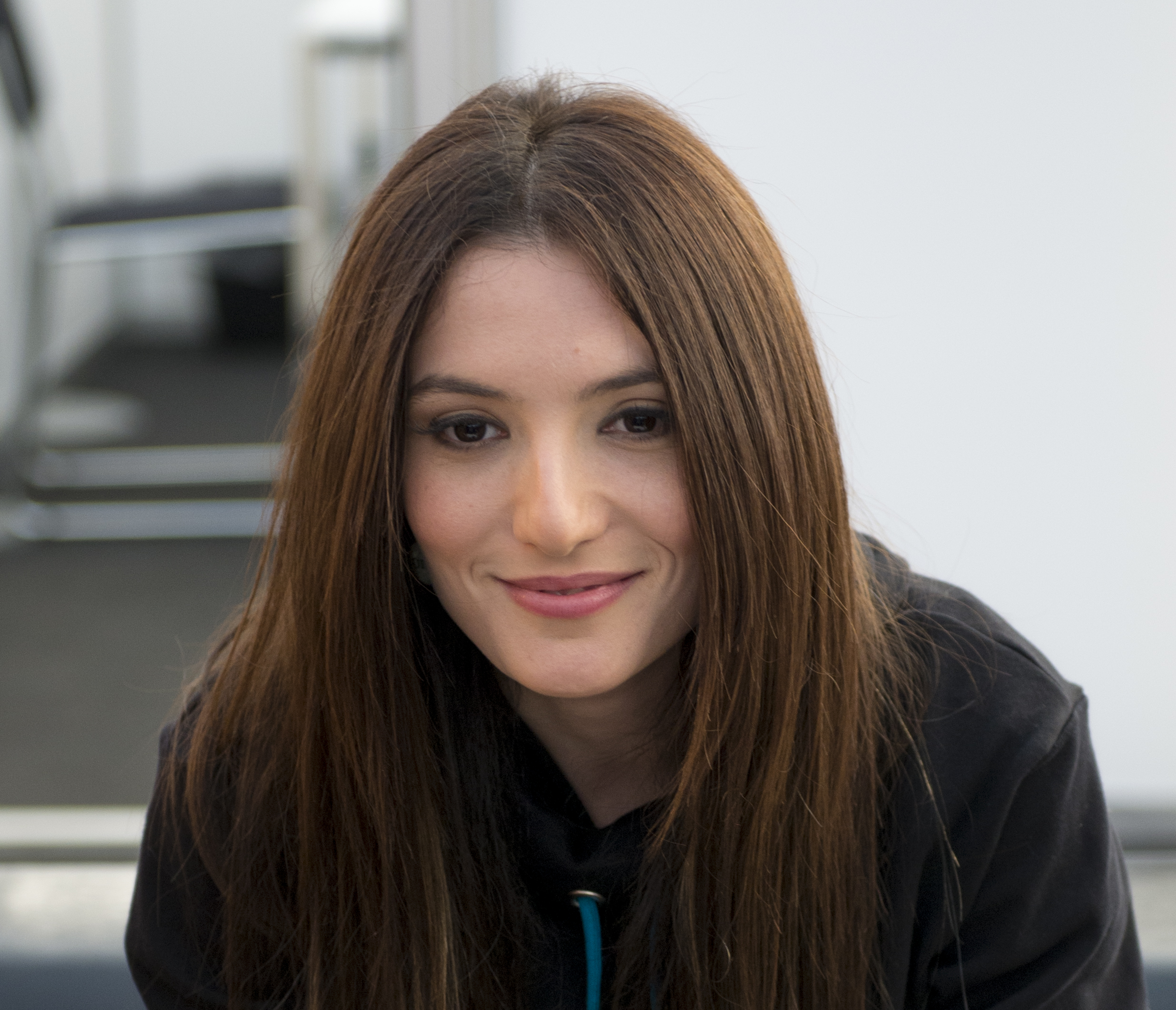
- Kazimova in 2014

Background information
- Born: Dilara Kazimova; May 20, 1984 (age 42); Baku, Azerbaijan SSR, Soviet Union
- Genres: Pop, pop rock, rock, R&B
- Occupations: Singer, actress
- Instrument: Vocals
- Label: BEAT Music

Dilara Kazimova (Azerbaijani: Dilara Kazımova [dilɑˈɾæ cɑˈzɯmovɑ]; born 20 May 1984) is an Azerbaijani singer and actress. She represented Azerbaijan in the Eurovision Song Contest 2014 in Copenhagen with the song "Start a Fire".

== Career ==
Born in Baku, Kazimova studied vocal arts at the Baku Academy of Music. After graduating, she briefly performed as part of an opera troupe. From the early 2000s, she was a member of the rock band Unformal and later the lead singer for the duo Milk & Kisses. Both bands participated in the Azerbaijani national selection for the Eurovision Song Contest before, with Unformal placing second in the national final in 2008, and Milk & Kisses placing second again in the national final in 2010. In 2010, the duo Milk & Kisses represented Azerbaijan at the annual New Wave music festival in Jurmala, Latvia, but came 16th out of 17 contestants.

Dilara Kazimova presenting herself

In 2014, Kazimova participated in the Azerbaijani selection (this time by herself) and won the competition. "Start a Fire", the song with which Dilara represented Azerbaijan in Copenhagen, was released two weeks later, on 16 March 2014, at the same time as the video clip. Dilara performed in the first semi-final of the contest, placing 9th with 57 points and ultimately qualified to the final. In the final she came 22nd with 33 points.

Also in 2014, Kazimova was a contestant on the fourth season the Ukrainian reality talent show Holos Krayiny (part of the international syndication The Voice), under the coaching of Svyatoslav Vakarchuk.

Kazimova has also starred in two Azerbaijani films Try Not to Breathe (alongside Fakhraddin Manafov) in 2006 and Purgatory (for which she recorded the soundtrack "Sonsuz yol" as part of the band Unformal) in 2007.

In May 2022, Kazimova performed at the EuroVillage festival in Baku, whose goal is to promote cooperation between the EU and Azerbaijan.

== Discography ==
=== Singles ===
Title	Year	Album
"Start a Fire"	2014	Non-album singles
"Dream"	2016	Non-album singles

== Filmography ==
Year	Film	Role	Notes
2006	Try Not to Breathe		Short film, debut film
2007	Prugatory		Supporting role and soundtrack

Awards and achievements
Preceded by Farid Mammadov with "Hold Me"	Azerbaijan in the Eurovision Song Contest; 2014	Succeeded by Elnur Hüseynov with "Hour of the Wolf"
