= Samir Javadzadeh =

Azerbaijani singer (born 1980)

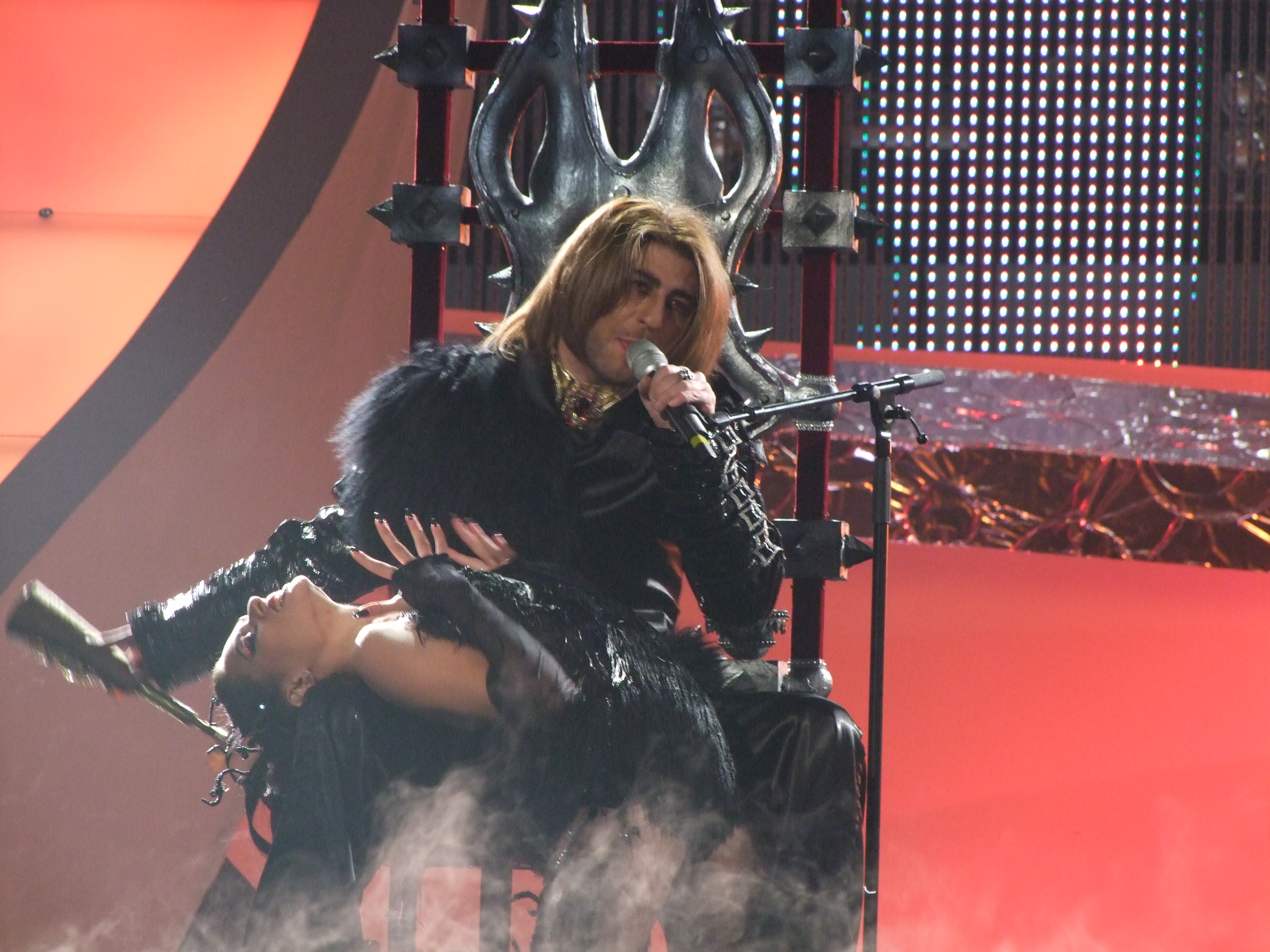
Samir Javadzadeh with an unnamed female dancer at Eurovision Song Contest 2008 in Belgrade.

Samir Javadzadeh (Azerbaijani: Samir Cavadzadə pron. [sɑˈmiɾ dʒɑvɑdzɑˈdæ]; born 16 April 1980, Baku, Azerbaijan) is an Azerbaijani pop singer. He was selected as the Azerbaijani representative, along with Elnur Hüseynov, to perform at the Eurovision Song Contest 2008. They performed "Day After Day" finishing 8th overall.

== Career ==
Samir Javadzadeh graduated from the university with a degree in business in 2002. In 2003, he finished a five-year courses in music, specializing in mugham. After serving in the army for a year, he became a member of the pop band Sheron for the next three years and eventually started pursuing solo career.

Originally, Samir Javadzadeh was not named among those who competed to represent Azerbaijan at Eurovision. On 2 February 2008, the jury chose Elnur Hüseynov over two other candidates (Aynur Isgandarli and the rock band Unformal), and it was then revealed that the winning song "Day After Day" would be performed as a duet by Hüseynov and Javadzadeh. In an interview following the decision, one of the coordinators of the contest (and author of the lyrics of "Day After Day") Zahra Badalbeyli stated that it was not contrary to the contest rules for Elnur Hüseynov to invite another performer or more to sing with him, and that it was his and Javadzadeh's mutual agreement to perform the song in a duet.

== Personal life ==
In July 2012, Javadzadeh announced his plans to get married.

== See also ==
- Azerbaijan in the Eurovision Song Contest
- Azerbaijan in the Eurovision Song Contest 2008

Awards and achievements
Preceded by none (Debut entry)	Azerbaijan in the Eurovision Song Contest (with Elnur); 2008	Succeeded by AySel & Arash with "Always"
