= Drip Drop (Safura song) =

2010 single by Safura Alizadeh

Single by Safura

from the album It's My War
- B-side: "Soulless"; "Gonna Let You Know"
- Released: 18 June 2010
- Recorded: 2010
- Genre: Pop
- Length: 3:42
- Label: BIP Records
- Songwriters: Anders Bagge; Stefan Örn; Sandra Bjurman
- Producer: Niklas Flyckt

Safura singles chronology
"Drip Drop" (2010)	"March On" (2010)

Eurovision Song Contest 2010 entry
- Country: Azerbaijan
- Artist: Safura
- Language: English
- Composers: Anders Bagge; Stefan Örn
- Lyricist: Sandra Bjurman

Finals performance
- Semi-final result: 2nd
- Semi-final points: 113
- Final result: 5th
- Final points: 145

Entry chronology
- ◄ ""Always"" (2009)
- ""Running Scared"" (2011) ►

Audio sample
- Drip Drop: file; help

"Drip Drop" is a song by Azerbaijani singer Safura Alizadeh, written by Anders Bagge, Stefan Örn, Piotr Wass and Sandra Bjurman, and represented Azerbaijan at the Eurovision Song Contest 2010 in May 2010. Alizadeh's song was selected by a jury from the Azeri broadcaster İctimai Televiziya və Radio Yayımları Şirkəti (İTV). On 29 May 2010 "Drip Drop" gained the fifth place at the Eurovision 2010 final.

Euromedia and Luxen Group of Companies on behalf of İTV received many remix offers for "Drip Drop". Taking a selective attitude, they approached DJs Maverick and Alex Guerrero for the assignment. Their remixes went in rotation on various European radio stations.

== Track list ==
- European CD single
1. "Drip Drop" (Extended version) 3:42
2. "Soulless" 3:10
3. "Gonna Let You Know" 3:37

== Music video ==
The shooting personnel included the video director Rupert Wainwright, choreographer Charles Lawrence and stylist Tanya Gill. All were invited to Ukraine on behalf of İTV by the Euromedia and Luxen Group of Companies. The shooting took place in Kyiv on the weekend of 16 April and lasted 37 hours with Safura being accompanied by Ukrainian dancers. The music video was presented on 29 April 2010. In April 2010 BIP Records released "Drip Drop" as a digital single in Belgium and the local radio channel MNM added the song to its playlist.

The video is focused on irresistible love. According to Knight, it features "the story of the girl that wants to be in love, but the guy is just not that into her and the choreography showcases that story" and "this comes up to the mix of contemporary and urban styles".

== Charts ==
=== Weekly charts ===
Chart (2010)	Peak position
Austria (Ö3 Austria Top 40)	41
Belgium (Ultratop 50 Flanders)	38
Germany (GfK)	26
Norway (VG-lista)	15
Poland (Polish Airplay New)	1
Slovakia Airplay (ČNS IFPI)	46
Sweden (Sverigetopplistan)	40
Switzerland (Schweizer Hitparade)	22
Turkey (Turkish Singles Chart)	21
UK Singles Chart	181

=== Year-end charts ===
Year-end chart performance for "Drip Drop"
Chart (2012)	Position
Ukraine Airplay (TopHit)	188
