= Pirembel =

- Municipality
- Location within Azerbaijan
- Coordinates: 38°55′15″N 48°07′39″E
- Country: Azerbaijan
- Rayon: Yardymli

Population
  - Total: 557
- Time zone: UTC+4 (AZT)
  - Summer (DST): UTC+5 (AZT)

Pirembel is a village and municipality in the Yardymli Rayon of Azerbaijan. It has a population of 557.

== Infrastructure ==
The village has several local facilities:

- Perimbel Village Secondary School – The local public educational institution.
- Perimbel Family Recreation Center (Azerbaijani: Perimbel Ailəvi İstirahət Mərkəzi) – A local resort and park area.
- Natural Springs – The area is known for its fresh water sources, including the Goznari (Azerbaijani: Göznəri) spring.
- Local Mosque – A community place for worship.
