= Unformal =

Azerbaijani band

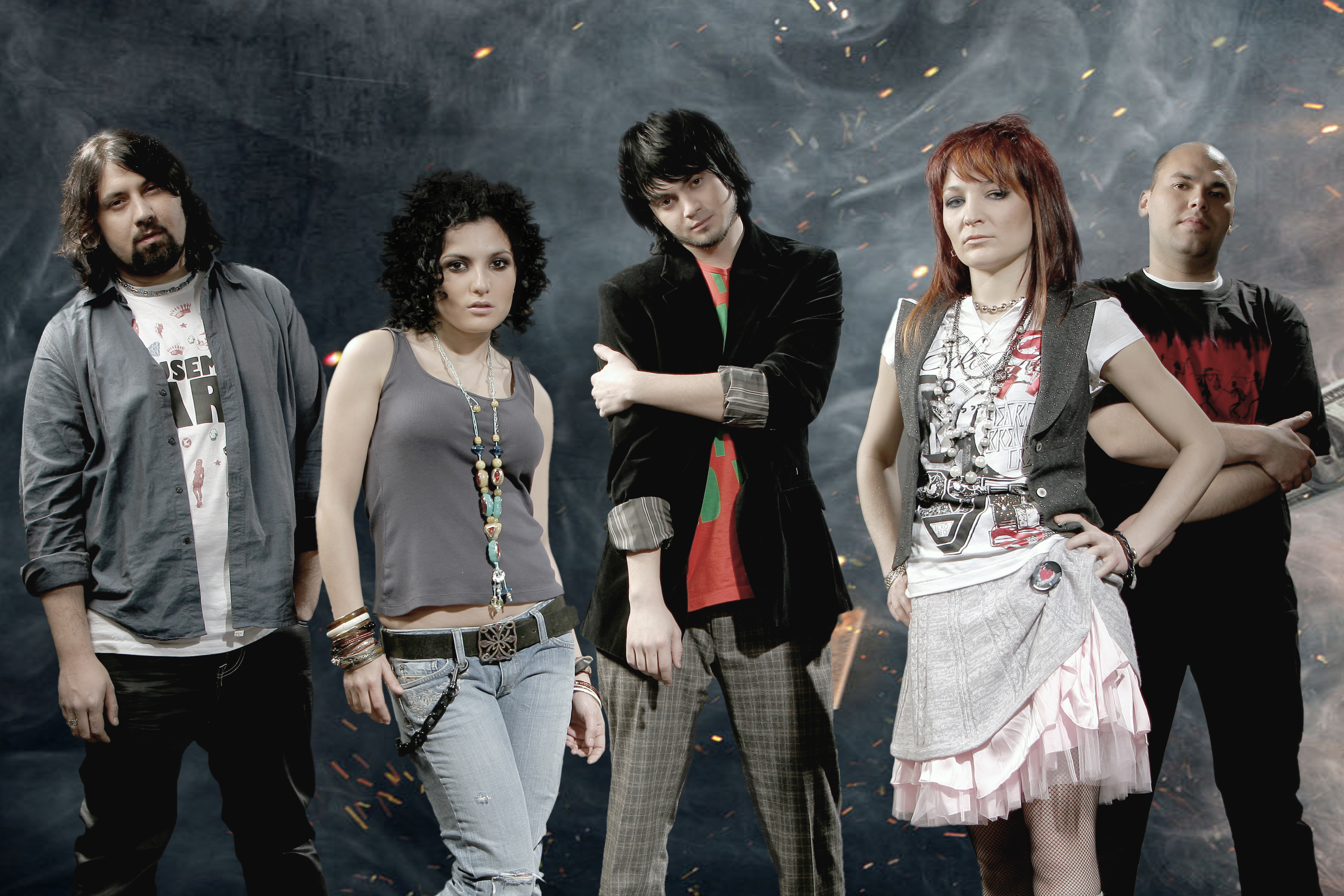

Background information
- Origin: Baku, Absheron Peninsula, Azerbaijan
- Genres: Alternative rock, alternative metal, progressive rock, nu metal
- Years active: 2000–2009
- Labels: UHS, Sultan
- Past members: Dilara Kazimova; Farida Nelson; Orkhan Huseinov; Evgeniy Manukhin; Igor Garanin; Yashar Bakhish; Rustam (Ph)Mammadov; Ismayilov Novruz; Toro; Rustam (KRoT) Aliyev; Imran (FuzZz) Rzayev; Ferdi (Multik) Ramazanov; Yaroslav Fadeev; Vagif Zaliev (Vitya)

Unformal was an Azerbaijani rock band from Baku, performing in Azeri and in English as well.

Unformal was founded in 2000 by Rustam Mammadov and Novruz Ismayilov. During the first years of its existence it was known as a hard rock band. In 2001 Unformal won Azerbaijan Rock Award Competition. In 2006 vocalist Delya and electro-guitar performer Looper joined to the band. Since then Unformal changed and now it is an alternative rock band. In March 2007 the single “Sonsuz yol” acclaimed by listeners, becoming the top-ranked song on the Azerbaijani, Ukrainian and Turkish charts.

Unformal also took place in national final of Azerbaijan in Eurovision Song Contest 2008 and became second after Elnur Huseynov and Samir Javadzadeh.

== Band members ==
- Evgeniy Manukhin - drums;
- Farida Nelson - bass, piano, backing vocal
- Dilara Kazimova - vocal
- Igor Garanin (LOOPer) - guitar, synth, programming
- Yashar Bakhish - guitar
- Toro - keyboard

== Discography ==
- Norm of Reality (2003, demo)
- Unformal (2005, demo)
