= Green Theatre =

Coordinates: 40°21′37″N 49°49′50″E

- Yaşıl teatr
- Interactive map of the Green Theatre area

General information
- Location: Baku, Azerbaijan
- Completed: 1960s

Technical details
- Floor count: 2,500

Other information
- Seating capacity: 2,500

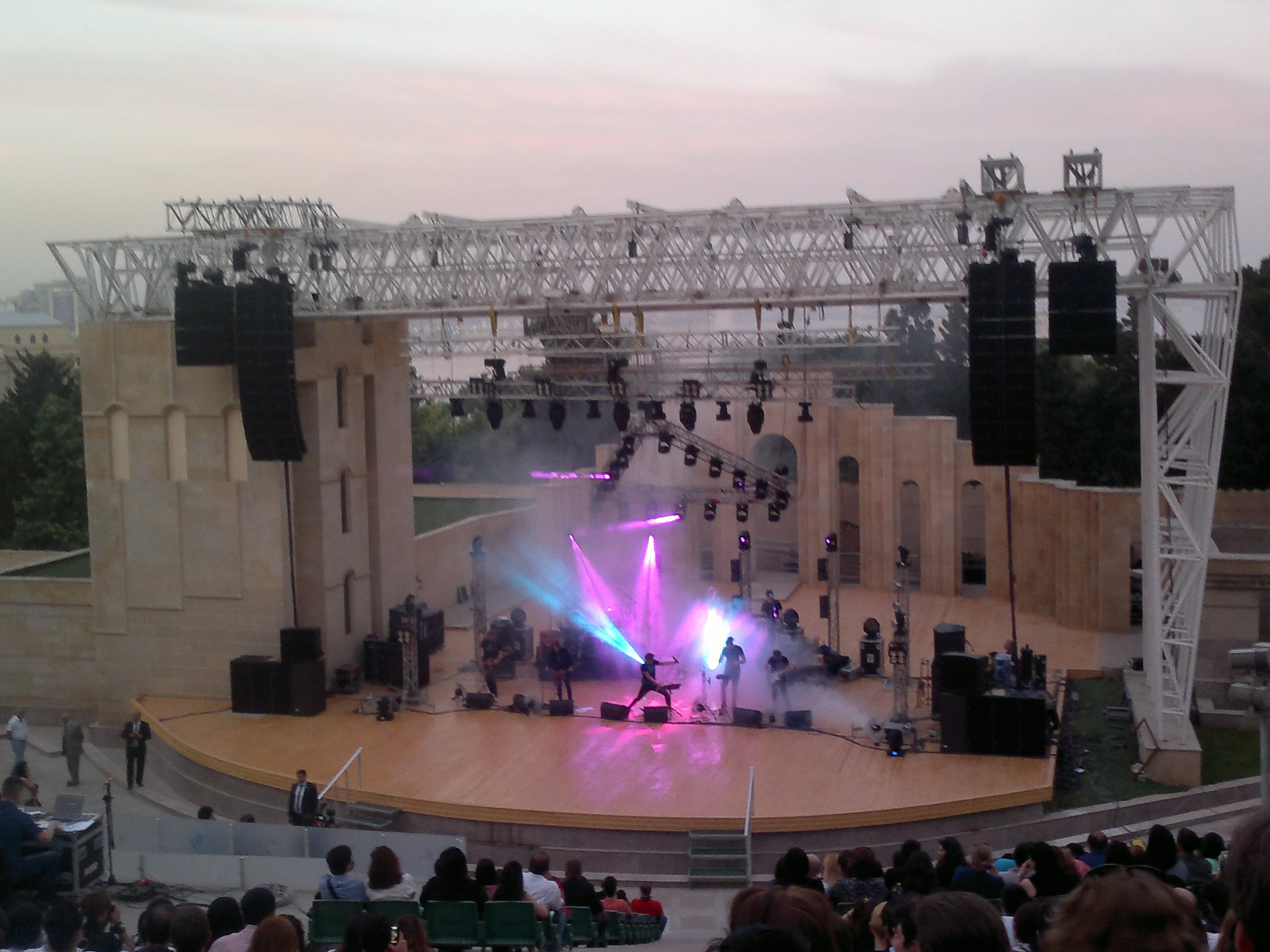
Bi-2 concert at the Green Theatre, 2015

The Green Theatre (Azerbaijani: Yaşıl teatr) is an open-air theatre in Baku, the capital city of Azerbaijan. The theatre seats 2,500 spectators.

The theatre was built in the mid-1960s on the initiative of the city's mayor of the time Alish Lambaranski. The Green Theatre was built as a venue intended for important cultural events.

In 1993, the theatre ceased functioning. In August 2005, Ilham Aliyev, the President of Azerbaijan ordered to carry out repairs works in the theatre. Speaking at the opening ceremony, Ilham Aliyev hoped that the venue would become "the favourite entertainment place of the people of Baku".
