= It's My War =

Studio album by Safura Alizadeh
- Released: 18 June 2010
- Recorded: 2010
- Genre: Pop; R&B
- Label: Zaphire/Alive

Singles from It's My War
- 1. "Drip Drop" Released: 28 May 2010; 2. "March On" Released: 3 September 2010

It's My War is the debut album of Azerbaijani musician Safura Alizadeh. The album was recorded in Sweden and includes the single "Drip Drop", Safura's entry in the Eurovision Song Contest 2010. The album was recorded over a period of months. It has been released under the labels of Zaphire and Alive records.

== Background ==
Being recorded in Sweden, the album was released in most European countries on 18 June 2010. Apart from "Drip Drop", the album features twelve other pop and R&B pieces.

=== Singles ===
"Drip Drop" was the first single from It's My War. Safura was picked to sing the single at the Eurovision Song Contest 2010 and the single was released under BIP records, which gave Safura full rights to the single so she could include the single in her debut album. The director of the music video for "Drip Drop" was Rupert Wainwright and the choreographer of the video was JaQuel Knight, who has choreographed Beyoncé's "Single Ladies (Put a Ring on It)". The stylist was Tanya Gill.

"March On" was picked as the second single from the debut album. It was released on 3 September.

=== March On ===
"March On"

Single by Safura

from the album It's My War
- Released: 3 September 2010
- Recorded: 2010
- Genre: Dance; pop
- Length: 3:14
- Label: Zaphire
- Songwriter(s): Anders Bagge, Stefan Örn

Safura singles chronology
"Drip Drop" (2010)	"March On" (2010)

"March On", the second single from the album was released with a music video on 2 August 2010, while the single itself appeared in September. It features a mainstream uptempo pop with a drum beat that blends with Safura's vocals. The single failed to chart in any European country.

==== Track listing ====
CD and Digital download
No.	Title	Lyrics	Length
1.	"March On"	Anders Bagge, Stefan Örn	3:14
2.	"It's My War"	Anders Bagge, Stefan Örn	4:21

==== Credits and personnel ====
- Lead vocals – Safura
- Producers –
- Music – Anders Bagge, Stefan Örn
- Lyrics – Anders Bagge, Stefan Örn
- Label: Zaphire

== Track listing ==
1. "Drip Drop" (Album Version) 3:41
2. "March On" 3:14
3. "Runway" 3:41
4. "Something Bigger" 3:07
5. "Glass House" 3:15
6. "From Her, From Love" 3:25
7. "Too Many Times" 4:15
8. "Gonna Let You Know" (Album Version) 3:35
9. "Soulless" (Album Version) 3:09
10. "That Means You Don't" 3:33
11. "It's My War" 4:21
12. "Drip Drop" (St. Destiny Remix ft. Maverick) 4:56
13. "Drip Drop" (Success Remix ft. Perez & Radomir) 3:32

== Release history ==
Region	Date	Label	Format
Azerbaijan	18 June 2010	Zaphire Music	CD
Germany	18 June 2010	Zaphire (Alive)	CD, digital download
Norway	18 June 2010	Zaphire Music	Digital download
Sweden	18 June 2010	Zaphire Music	Digital download
United Kingdom	18 June 2010	Alive	Digital download
