= Azerbaijan in the Eurovision Song Contest 2008 =

- Eurovision Song Contest 2008
- Participating broadcaster: İctimai Televiziya (İTV)
- Country: Azerbaijan
- Selection process: Artist: Land of Fire 2008; Song: Internal selection
- Selection date: Artist: 2 February 2008; Song: 8 February 2008

Competing entry
- Song: "Day After Day"
- Artist: Elnur and Samir
- Songwriters: Govhar Hasanzadeh; Zahra Badalbeyli

Placement
- Semi-final result: Qualified (6th, 96 points)
- Final result: 8th, 132 points

Participation chronology

Azerbaijan was represented at the Eurovision Song Contest 2008 with the song "Day After Day", composed by Govhar Hasanzadeh, with lyrics by Zahra Badalbeyli, and performed by Elnur and Samir. The Azerbaijani participating broadcaster, İctimai Televiziya (İTV), selected its representative through Land of Fire 2008. The final took place on 2 February 2008 and a fifteen-member jury selected Elnur Hüseynov as the winner. The song, performed in a duet with Samir Javadzadeh, was internally selected and announced on 8 February. This was the first-ever entry from Azerbaijan in the Eurovision Song Contest.

Azerbaijan was drawn to compete in the first semi-final of the Eurovision Song Contest which took place on 20 May 2008. Performing during the show in position 7, "Day After Day" was announced among the 10 qualifying entries of the first semi-final and therefore qualified to compete in the final on 24 May. It was later revealed that Azerbaijan placed sixth out of the 19 participating countries in the semi-final with 96 points. In the final, Azerbaijan performed in position 20 and placed eighth out of the 25 participating countries, scoring 132 points.

== Background ==
On 15 October 2007, the Azerbaijani national broadcaster, İctimai Televiziya (İTV), confirmed its intentions to debut at the Eurovision Song Contest in its 2008 edition after becoming an active member of the European Broadcasting Union (EBU) on 5 July 2007. İTV would also broadcast the event within the country and organise the selection process for its entry. For its 2008 entry, the broadcaster opted to organise a national final titled Land of Fire, which resulted in the selection of a winning performer that would subsequently be given an internally selected song to perform at Eurovision.

== Before Eurovision ==
=== Land of Fire 2008 ===
Land of Fire 2008 was the national final organised by İTV to select its representative for the Eurovision Song Contest 2008. The competition took place on 2 February 2008 at the Heydar Aliyev Palace in Baku, hosted by Husniyya Maharramova and Ilham Gasimov and was broadcast on İTV as well as streamed online via the broadcaster's website itv.az and the official Eurovision Song Contest website eurovision.tv. The competition was also broadcast in Turkey on TRT2 and TRT Türk, in Georgia on GPB and in Lithuania on LRT.

==== Format ====
The national final consisted of two stages. The first stage involved an audition period where interested artists attended auditions. Five artists were shortlisted, three of them which were selected to advance to the second stage, the televised show. In the final on 2 February 2008, the winner as determined by the votes of a thirteen-member jury panel was selected from the three artists who each performed two original songs.

The members of the jury were:

- Ismail Omarov – General Director of İTV
- Ibrahim Guliyev – Executive Director of the Azerbaijani Culture Friends Foundation
- Farhad Badalbeyli – Rector of the Baku Academy of Music
- Mikhail Gusman – First Deputy General Director of the "ITAR-TASS" information agency
- Lala Kazimova – President of the National Music Committee of Azerbaijan
- Vagif Gerayzade – composer
- Eldar Mansurov – composer
- Afag Malikova – Artistic Director of the Azerbaijan State Dance Ensemble
- Azad Aliyev – conductor
- Murad Adigozelzade – Director of the Azerbaijan State Academic Philharmonic Hall
- Rauf Babayev – Artistic Director of Gaya State Ensemble
- Natavan Sheykhova – singer
- Tarana Muradova – folk artist and dancer

==== Competing artists ====
On 14 November 2007, İTV revealed that five potential performers had been shortlisted from 40 artists that attended a casting round held at the Rashid Behbudov State Song Theatre in Baku in October 2007: Aynur Iskenderli, Aytaj Jafarova, Elnur Hüseynov, Erkin Osmanli and Unformal. On 11 January 2008, the three artists selected for the competition based on the decision of İTV and a six-member jury panel were announced. The members of the jury were Azad Rahimov (Minister of Youth and Sports of Azerbaijan), Nargiz Pashayeva (professor), Akif Malikov (Director of the Azerbaijan State Academic Opera and Ballet Theatre), Vagif Gerayzade (composer), Faiq Suceddinov (singer and composer) and Tarana Muradova (folk artist and dancer).

==== Final ====
The final took place on 2 February 2008 where the three artists each performed two original songs. Elnur Hüseynov was selected by the jury as the winner. In addition to the performances of the artists, Turkish Eurovision Song Contest 2003 winner Sertab Erener, Ukrainian Eurovision Song Contest 2004 winner Ruslana and Serbian Eurovision Song Contest 2007 winner Marija Šerifović performed during the show as guests.

Final – 2 February 2008
R/O	Artist	Song 1	R/O	Song 2	Place
1	Elnur Hüseynov	"If You Never Back" (Isa Melikov, Paulina Melikova)	6	"Day After Day" (Note: Performed in a duet with Samir Javadzadeh.) (Govhar Hasanzadeh, Zahra Badalbeyli)	1
2	Unformal	"Lalala Song" (Farida Jafarova, Dilara Kazimova)	5	"Little Muse" (Farida Jafarova, Igor Garanin, Togrul Manafov)	2
3	Aynur Iskenderli	"Swear That You Will Stay" (Ilham Abdullayev, Zahra Badalbeyli)	4	"Rhythm of Fire" (Mikhail Nekrasov, Zahra Badalbeyli)	3

=== Song selection ===
On 8 February 2008, İTV announced that Elnur Hüseynov would be performing the song "Day After Day" at the Eurovision Song Contest 2008 in a duet with Samir Javadzadeh. The selection of the song was based on the decision of İTV and the thirteen-member jury panel of Land of Fire 2008 from the two songs performed by Hüseynov during the national final. In April 2008, a new version of the song was recorded at the Modern World Studios in London, which included additional mugham vocals.

=== Promotion ===
Elnur and Samir made several appearances across Europe to specifically promote "Day After Day" as the Azerbaijani Eurovision entry. Elnur and Samir performed "Day After Day" during the Ukrainian Eurovision national final on 23 February, the Greek Eurovision national final Ellinikós Telikós 2008 on 27 February, and the final of the Latvian Eurovision national final Eirodziesma 2008 on 1 March. Between 3 and 5 March, Elnur and Samir took part in promotional activities in Georgia. On 9 May, Elnur and Samir performed during a concert which was held at the Maslak Parkorman venue in Istanbul, Turkey. Elnur and Samir also took part in promotional activities in Andorra, Finland, Malta, Slovenia and the United Kingdom.

== At Eurovision ==
It was announced in September 2007 that the competition's format would be expanded to two semi-finals in 2008. According to the rules, all nations with the exceptions of the host country and the "Big Four" (France, Germany, Spain and the United Kingdom) are required to qualify from one of two semi-finals in order to compete for the final; the top nine songs from each semi-final as determined by televoting progress to the final, and a tenth was determined by back-up juries. The EBU split up the competing countries into six different pots based on voting patterns from previous contests, with countries with favourable voting histories put into the same pot. On 28 January 2008, a special allocation draw was held which placed each country into one of the two semi-finals. Azerbaijan was placed into the first semi-final, to be held on 20 May 2008. The running order for the semi-finals was decided through another draw on 17 March 2008 and as one of the six wildcard countries, Azerbaijan chose to perform in position 7, following the entry from Belgium and before the entry from Slovenia.

The two semi-finals and final were broadcast in Azerbaijan on İTV with commentary by Isa Melikov and Husniya Maharramova. İTV appointed Leyla Aliyeva as its spokesperson to announce the Azerbaijani votes during the final.

=== Semi-final ===
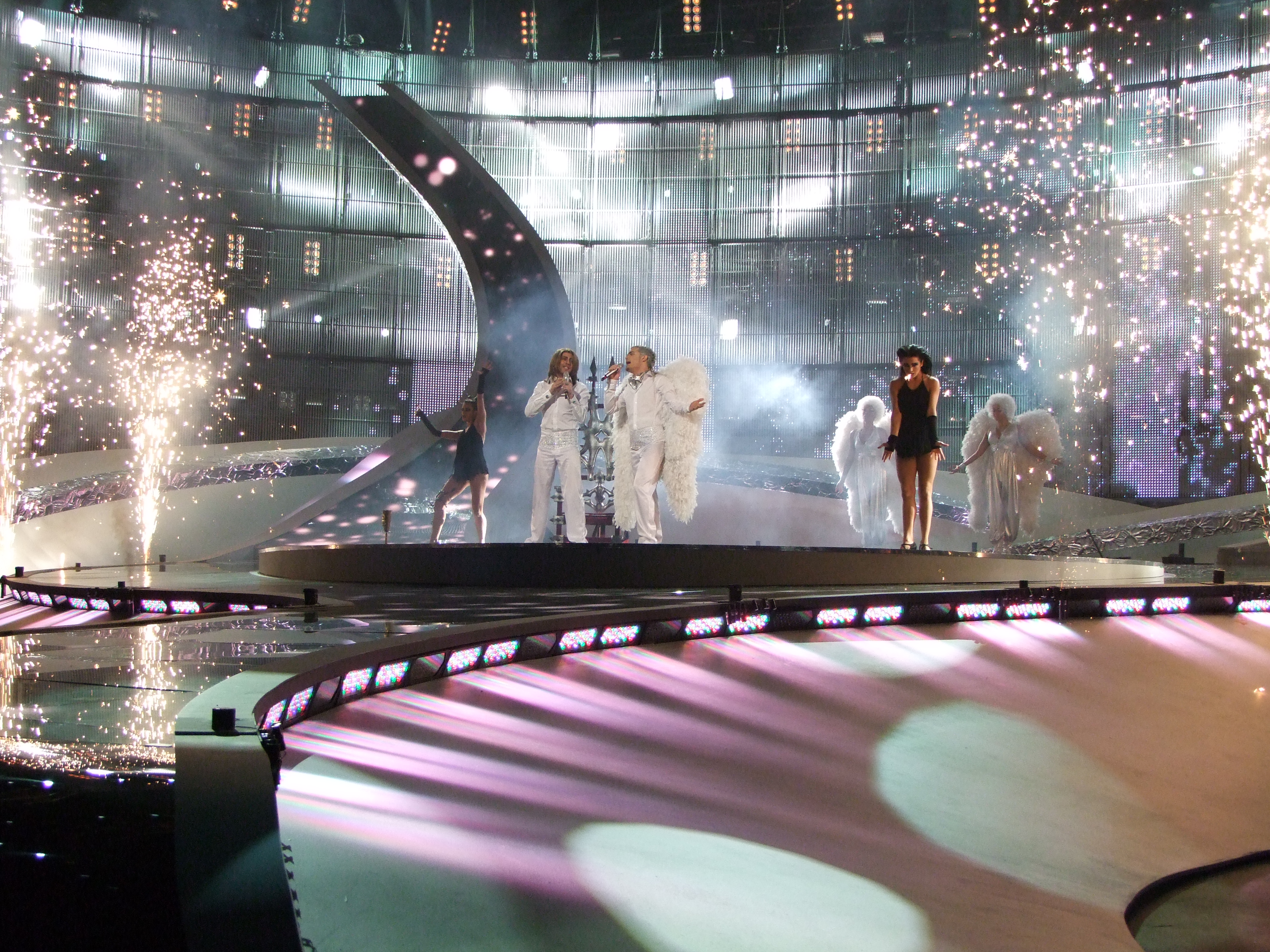
Elnur and Samir during a rehearsal before the first semi-final

Elnur and Samir took part in technical rehearsals on 11 and 15 May, followed by dress rehearsals on 19 and 20 May. The Azerbaijani performance featured Elnur and Samir dressed as angel and devil, which symbolised the eternal dialogue between good and evil, performing with four dancers. Samir performed on a throne which fell apart towards the end of the song. The performance also incorporated pyrotechnic effects. In regards to the performance, Elnur and Samir stated: "The global main topic at this very moment is war. Everything evil comes from the devil - who is, in fact, just a fallen angel who was expelled from paradise. He symbolizes everything evil which happens on earth. However, he can turn into an angel again, which means winning over all evil. We just hope that this will happen some time soon in our world."

At the end of the show, Azerbaijan was announced as having finished in the top 10 and subsequently qualifying for the grand final. It was later revealed that Azerbaijan placed sixth in the semi-final, receiving a total of 96 points.

=== Final ===
Shortly after the first semi-final, a winners' press conference was held for the ten qualifying countries. As part of this press conference, the qualifying artists took part in a draw to determine the running order for the final. This draw was done in the order the countries were announced during the semi-final. Azerbaijan was drawn to perform in position 20, following the entry from France and before the entry from Greece.

Elnur and Samir once again took part in dress rehearsals on 23 and 24 May before the final. The duo performed a repeat of their semi-final performance during the final on 24 May. At the conclusion of the voting, Azerbaijan finished in eighth place with 132 points.

=== Voting ===
Below is a breakdown of points awarded to Azerbaijan and awarded by Azerbaijan in the first semi-final and grand final of the contest. The nation awarded its 12 points to Greece in the semi-final and to Turkey in the final of the contest.

==== Points awarded to Azerbaijan ====
Points awarded to Azerbaijan (Semi-final 1)
Score	Country
12 points	
10 points	Moldova; Poland; Russia
8 points	Andorra; Germany
7 points	Greece; Romania
6 points	
5 points	Belgium; Finland; Ireland; Israel
4 points	Estonia; Netherlands
3 points	Bosnia and Herzegovina; Montenegro
2 points	Armenia
1 point	

Points awarded to Azerbaijan (Final)
Score	Country
12 points	Hungary; Turkey
10 points	Czech Republic; Russia; Ukraine
8 points	Belarus; Macedonia; Moldova
7 points	Andorra; Belgium; Georgia; Lithuania; Poland
6 points	
5 points	
4 points	Latvia
3 points	Bulgaria; Greece; Israel
2 points	Netherlands; Romania
1 point	Germany; Slovenia

==== Points awarded by Azerbaijan ====
Points awarded by Azerbaijan (Semi-final 1)
Score	Country
12 points	Greece
10 points	Israel
8 points	Russia
7 points	Norway
6 points	Romania
5 points	Moldova
4 points	Bosnia and Herzegovina
3 points	Poland
2 points	Netherlands
1 point	Slovenia

Points awarded by Azerbaijan (Final)
Score	Country
12 points	Turkey
10 points	Ukraine
8 points	Russia
7 points	Israel
6 points	Greece
5 points	Norway
4 points	Georgia
3 points	Bosnia and Herzegovina
2 points	Serbia
1 point	Albania
