= ANS Group of Companies =

The ANS Group of Companies is a news and broadcasting company in Azerbaijan.

It was founded by three young Azeri journalists, brothers Vahid and Seyfulla Mustafayev in 1990. The Company name, ANS, derives from the first letters of Azerbaijan News Service. ANS was the first privately owned company in the former Soviet Union.

Being an independent news company, ANS Group of Companies has played a significant role in the development of the independent media in Azerbaijan. ANS Group of Companies has owned four sub-companies: ANS TV (now defunct), ANS ChM, ANS Press and ANS Kommers (Also first Azerbaijan Watches maker Company VMF). The group has also been known for its outspokenness, as seen through its media outlets.
