= Always (Aysel and Arash song) =

2009 song by AySel and Arash

Single by Aysel & Arash

from the album Donya
- Released: 3 March 2009
- Recorded: 2009
- Genre: Dance; Folk-pop
- Label: Warner Music Sweden
- Composers: Arash Labaf; Robert Uhlmann; Johan Bejerholm; Marcus Englof; Alex Papaconstantinou
- Lyricists: Arash Labaf; Robert Uhlmann; Elin Wrethov; Anderz Wrethov

Eurovision Song Contest 2009 entry
- Country: Azerbaijan
- Artists: Aysel Teymurzadeh, Arash Labaf
- As: Aysel & Arash
- Language: English
- Composers: Arash Labaf; Robert Uhlmann; Johan Bejerholm; Marcus Englof; Alex Papaconstantinou
- Lyricists: Arash Labaf; Robert Uhlmann; Elin Wrethov; Anderz Wrethov

Finals performance
- Semi-final result: 2nd
- Semi-final points: 180
- Final result: 3rd
- Final points: 207

Entry chronology
- ◄ "Day After Day" (2008)
- "Drip Drop" (2010) ►

"Always" is a song by Azerbaijani singer Aysel Teymurzadeh (performing mononymously) and Iranian singersongwriter Arash Labaf (also performing mononymously). It was the Azerbaijani entry to the Eurovision Song Contest 2009. The song was selected by Ictimai TV (İTV), the Azerbaijani broadcaster, among the 30 songs submitted to the broadcaster in an open call. The song was composed by a group of songwriters including Arash.

The video clip for the song was directed by Swedish director Fredrik Boklund and premiered on Ictimai TV on 24 April 2009. Boklund described the video as "visual rendition of the performers' emotions and feelings." It notably featured tar, a traditional Azeri musical instrument. Likewise the instrument briefly appeared on stage in Arash's hands during the live performance of "Always" at Eurovision.

AySel & Arash performed 12th in the second Eurovision semi-final on 14 May, following Hungary's Zoli Ádok with "Dance with Me" and preceding Greece's Sakis Rouvas with "This Is Our Night". The duo received 180 points, placing second behind Norway's Alexander Rybak, and proceeding to the final.

At the final the duo performed 11th in the draw, following Russia's Anastasiya Prikhodko with "Mamo" and preceding Bosnia and Herzegovina's Regina with "Bistra voda". They received 207 points, placing 3rd behind Norway's Alexander Rybak and Iceland's Yohanna. This was Azerbaijan's first top 3 placing.

As of 2025, the official video for "Always" had been played on YouTube over 53 million times, while the live performance in the Eurovision final has over 28 million views.

In January 2010, Tophit.ru reported that "Always" had become the second most selling ringtone in Ukraine and Belarus.

== Charts ==
=== Weekly ===
Chart (2009)	Peak position
CIS Airplay (TopHit)	75
Czech Republic Airplay Chart	40
European Hot 100 Singles	92
Germany (GfK)	96
Greek Billboard Singles Chart	2
Hungarian Airplay Chart	40
Iceland (RÚV)	16
Norway (VG-lista)	18
Slovakian Airplay Chart	47
Sweden (Sverigetopplistan)	3
Switzerland (Schweizer Hitparade)	98
Turkish Singles Chart	18
UK Singles Chart	137

=== Year-end ===
Chart (2009)	Position
Swedish Singles Chart	50

== Track listing ==
- Turkish – Digital single
1. "Always" (Single Version) – 3:03
2. "Always" (Ali Payami Remix) – 4:09
