= ANS TV =

Television channel in Azerbaijan

Azerbaijan News Service
- Country: Azerbaijan

Ownership
- Owner: ANS Group of Companies
- Key people: Vahid Mustafayev

History
- Launched: 26 November 1991
- Closed: 18 July 2016

Links
- Website: anstv.ws

ANS TV (also known as ANS Independent Broadcasting Media Company, stylized as ⱭNẞ until 2012) was a news television channel in Azerbaijan, which was owned by ANS Group of Companies from its foundation on 26 November 1991 until its closure on 18 July 2016. Its name, ANS, stands for Azerbaijani News Service.

== History ==
Former logo from 1999 until 2012

ANS was the first privately owned independent television company in the former Soviet Union. It has been described as a staunchly pro-government station.

In the early years of ANS' establishment, there were many local wars on the territory of the former Soviet Union. ANS TV got popularized by reporting news from the frontlines - Chechnya, Georgia, Ossetia, Karabakh, Abkhazia, Afghanistan, Ingushetia and frequently selling footage to BBC, CNN, NBC, ZDF, ARD, VOX, RAI, TF, Russia-1, CBS, TBS.

ANS TV was taken off the air in July 2016 when its broadcasting license was revoked after it had announced it was to broadcast an interview with Fethullah Gulen. Azerbaijan's National Television and Radio Council stated that the channel's license would be withdrawn permanently, accusing the station of "contradicting the strategic partnership between the Azeri and Turkish people by offering support to Fethullah Gulen and his supporters".

== Bizimkiler ==
In the run-up to Azerbaijan's success in the Eurovision Song Contest 2011, the station ran a project called Bizimkiler, which included top local musicians playing globally-known western tunes.

== See also ==
- ANS ChM
