= Chingiz Mustafayev (journalist) =

Azerbaijani journalist

Chingiz Mustafayev Çingiz Mustafayev
- Born: Çingiz Fuad oğlu Mustafayev; 29 August 1960; Baku, Azerbaijani SSR
- Died: 15 June 1992 (aged 31); Nakhichevanik, Azerbaijan
- Resting place: Martyrs' Lane
- Occupations: Journalist, author
- Spouse: Rafiga Mustafayeva (m. 1990)
- Children: Fuad Mustafayev
- Relatives: Vahid Mustafayev (brother); Seyfulla Mustafayev (brother)
- Writing career
- Period: 1991–1992
- Subjects: Politics, freedom of press, human rights
- Notable awards: National Hero of Azerbaijan; 1992

Chingiz Fuad oghlu Mustafayev (Azerbaijani: Çingiz Fuad oğlu Mustafayev, Чинҝиз Фуад оғлу Мустафајев, [t͡ʃiŋˈɟis fuˈɑt ɔˈɣlu mustɑˈfɑjɪf]; August 29, 1960 – June 15, 1992) was an independent Azerbaijani journalist, posthumously bestowed the title of National Hero of Azerbaijan. Mustafayev, with the medical degree and no formal background in journalism save for a year of on the job training, created a video record of the early stages of the First Nagorno-Karabakh War, most of the documentary had to be shot from the frontline which ultimately was the cause of his abrupt death due to mortar wounds.

== Early years ==
The Mustafayev family is described as the typical Azerbaijani family. His father was in the military and was working on missiles and rockets in the USSR. His mother hailed from the city of Shaki; Married when she was 19, Chingiz was the oldest child, born in 1960 and he had two brothers, Seyfulla Mustafayev, born in 1962, and Vahid Mustafayev, born in 1968.

== Filming documentaries ==
Mustafayev is known for having filmed the scenes with the bodies of victims of Khojaly Massacre in 1992. To document these scenes, he traveled on an army helicopter which at came under heavy enemy fire. His video film showing hundreds of dead bodies strewn across snow-covered fields of Khojaly served as evidence to the massacre.

== Music producer ==
Mustafayev produced Azerbaijan's first Hip Hop record in 1983.

== Death ==
On 15 June 1992, while filming a fire exchange between Azerbaijani and Armenian forces near the village of Nakhichevanik, Mustafayev fell to mortar fire. According to his brother Vahid, he was fatally wounded when a shell exploded right beside him and shrapnel from the shell severed one of his major arteries. By the time Mustafayev was airlifted to the hospital, he had died of blood loss. His last moments were captured on his own camera.

== Legacy ==
ANS CM 102 FM the first Radio Broadcasting Company in the Caucasus whose motto was "We are fated to struggle" has renamed the station in his honor.

A foundation was established in honour of Chingiz Mustafayev by ANS for the purposes of arranging journalism contests in various areas. Azerbaijani radio station ANS CM 102 FM also renamed after him and carries his slogan Döyüş alnımıza yazılıb (The war is written on our foreheads).
