= Azerbaijani jazz =

Music genre and scene

The Azerbaijani jazz (Azerbaijani: Azərbaycan cazı) is a popular variety of jazz, widespread in Azerbaijan. It covers a broad range of styles (traditional, post-pop, fusion, free flexion) and often features a blend with traditional Azeri music. Among modern famed Azeri jazz musicians are Aziza Mustafazadeh, who was influenced by Bill Evans and Keith Jarrett, Rain Sultanov, Isfar Sarabski, Shahin Novrasli.

== History ==
=== 20th century ===
Jazz first appeared in Azerbaijan at the beginning of the 20th century. During the Soviet period, Baku was one of the three cities best known for jazz, along with Saint Petersburg and Riga.

The Eastern Jazz Band, whose performances in Moscow were advertised in 1926, included Huseyngulu Sarabski as a soloist. In the 1930s, Niyazi and Tofig Guliyev created the first local jazz band. However, jazz in the Soviet Union faced prohibition and censorship from 1920 through 1953. By the 1950s, jazz musicians from many Soviet cities, looking for a safe harbour, gradually gathered in Baku. In the late 1960s, the Azerbaijani jazz music was boosted by such composers as Gara Garayev and Rauf Hajiyev.

In 1969, the first jazz festival was held in Baku.

=== 21st century ===
As of 2000s, the country saw an increase in jazz festivals; music festivals such as Baku International Jazz Festival and Gabala International Music Festival are held annually. The Baku Jazz Center has been created for development and support of jazz culture in Azerbaijan.

Baku Jazz Festival has been held since 2005; it was founded by the Azerbaijani musician Rain Sultanov and has proved itself as one of the biggest events in Azerbaijan for more than a decade. Baku Jazz Festival is a celebration of music and a forum that will include areas such as education (seminars, workshops), contests (young talents International Baku Jazz Competition "I am Jazzman!"), art and photo exhibitions, jam sessions, jazz film days, and jazz concerts. Baku Jazz Festival was attended by such artists as Al Jarreau, Joe Zawinul, Chick Corea, Herbie Hancock, Joshua Redman, Charles Lloyd, and Diana Krall. Baku Jazz Festival is advertised and covered on the Euronews channel, in 2006 the festival joined the list of the world's largest jazz festivals, and each year the festival is attended by over 200,000 spectators.

Jazz Dunyasi magazine is the first printed edition of jazz in Azerbaijan. It has been published since 2004 and was founded by its chief editor, Leyla Efendiyeva. The Jazz Dunyasi magazine talks about the world of jazz, jazz in Azerbaijan. It contains information on the new CD, jazz festivals, young talent and stars of jazz. The Jazz Dunyasi magazine has its annual pavilion at the international exhibition Jazzahead!

Artists such as Aziza Mustafa Zadeh, Rain Sultanov, Amina Figarova, Isfar Sarabski and Shahin Novrasli achieved worldwide success and returned triumphant from the Montreux Jazz Festival in 2007.

== Derivatives and offshoots ==
The most well-known type of Azerbaijani jazz is Jazz mugham, which includes a sultry combination of Mugham and traditional American jazz. The style reached its full fame in the 1950s and 1960s under the influence of composer Rafig Babayev and his Gaya Quartet and jazz pianist and composer Vagif Mustafazadeh. Dizzy Gillespie, the legendary American jazz trumpeter, reportedly lauded Mustafazadeh for creating "the music of the future."

== Notable performers ==
=== Individuals ===
==== Female ====
- Amina Figarova
- Aziza Mustafa Zadeh

==== Male ====
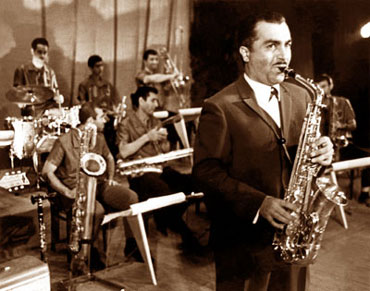
Tofig Ahmadov in the 1940s.

- Tofig Ahmadov
- Rafig Babayev
- Salman Gambarov
- Rauf Hajiyev
- Vagif Mustafazadeh
- Parviz Rustambeyov
- Emil Afrasiyab
- Shahin Novrasli
- Isfar Sarabski
- Rain Sultanov
- Elchin Shirinov

==== Groups ====
- Gaya Quartet
