= Baku Jazz Center =

Baku Jazz Center was founded in the year of 2002. The goal of creating it was to improve and keep up the jazz culture in Azerbaijan. Approximately, there are live jazz performances every evening. The center has jazz musicians and performers working in different jazz styles. Sometimes jazz concerts and movies are displayed on a large screen in the center.

The appearance and improvement of jazz in Azerbaijan dates back to the early years of 20th century when Baku known as the producer of a half of all the oil of the world experienced economic recovery. At that time more and more enterprising businessmen, architects, merchants, scientists and national and foreign artists began to appear in Azerbaijan and the wave of new music came to Azerbaijan. The Azerbaijani composers Niyazi and Tofig Guliyev established the first jazz orchestra in Baku in 1938. Niyazi and Tofig Guliyev had taken part in the first Soviet jazz orchestra of Alexander Tsfasman. The orchestra of Niyazi and Tofig Guliyev laid foundations of Azerbaijani jazz. The State jazz included three trombones, five saxophones, three trumpets, a piano, a guitar and percussion instruments.

During the first concert, along with jazz classics, musicians performed the works of Niyazi and Tofig Guliyev themselves. During the same time, the mugham 'Chargah' was first played with saxophone improvisations. In 1941–1945, after the end of the war, Rauf Hajiyev became the director of the 'State Jazz'.

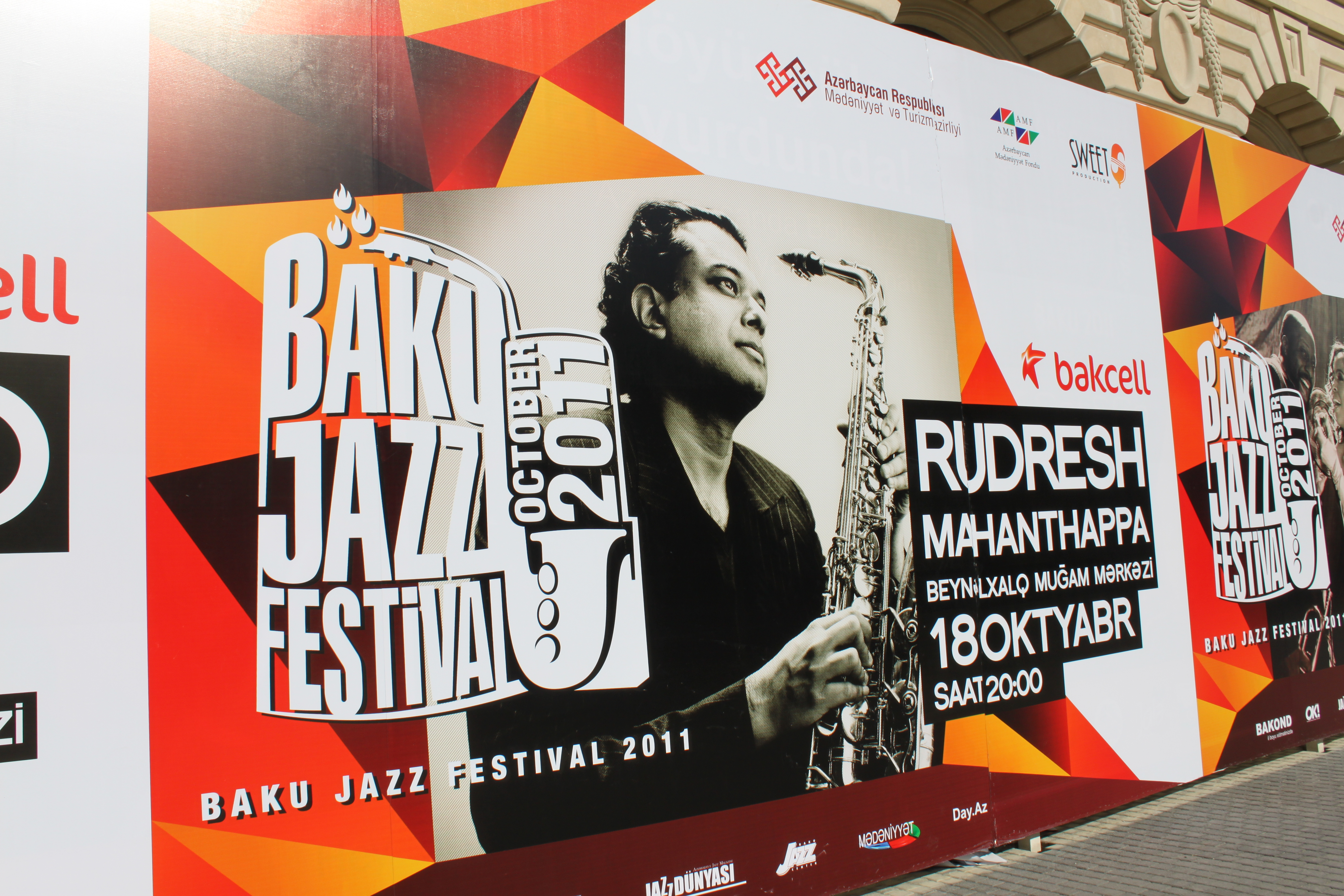
Baku International Jazz Festival 2011

The first jazz festival in Baku was held in 1969. After a break, the tradition came back in the year of 2005 and still lasts now. Every year, the festival invites jazz stars from around the world to Baku. Azerbaijani jazz performers, in their turn, are participants and winners of international jazz festivals and competitions. Azerbaijan has talented jazz musicians such as Vagif Mustafazadeh and Rafig Babayev.

== See also ==
- Azerbaijani jazz
