= List of Azerbaijani inventions and discoveries =

Azerbaijani inventions and discoveries are inventions and discoveries by Azerbaijani scientists and researchers, both locally and while working at overseas research institutes.

== Science ==
=== Mathematics ===
- Fuzzy Logic. Lotfi Aliasker Zadeh (1965).
- Fuzzy Set. Lotfi Aliasker Zadeh (1965).
- Fuzzy algorithms. Lotfi Aliasker Zadeh
- Fuzzy probabilities. Lotfi Aliasker Zadeh
- Fuzzy events. Lotfi Aliasker Zadeh
- Fuzzy information. Lotfi Aliasker Zadeh
- Fuzzy Control System. Lotfi Aliasker Zadeh (1973)

=== Linguistics ===
- Fuzzy semantics. Lotfi Aliasker Zadeh
- Fuzzy Languages. Lotfi Aliasker Zadeh

=== Oil industry ===
- Oil in Russia. Farman Salmanov (1961).
- Oil in India. Eyyub Taghiyev (1958)
- Oil in Brazil. Eyyub Taghiyev (1961)
- Offshore oil platform in Azerbaijan. Agha Aliyev (1949)

== Weapons ==
- Istiglal – a recoil-operated, semi-automatic anti-material sniper rifle.
- Yalguzag – a bolt-action sniper rifle that fires the 7.62×51mm NATO round used by the Azerbaijani Land Forces.

== Art ==
- Shabaka (window) – stained glass windows made by national Azerbaijani masters, without glue or nails.

=== Folk music ===
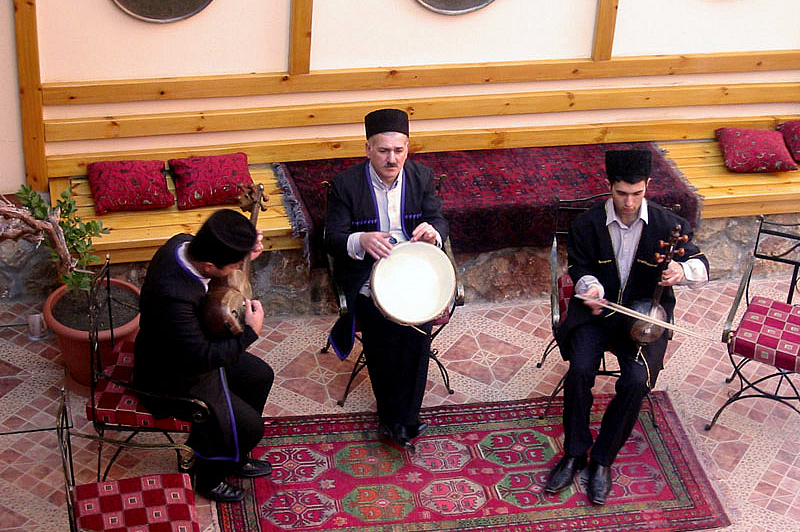
Mugham performers in Baku. From left: tar, daf, kamancha.

- Ashiqs of Azerbaijan
- Jazz-Mugham. Vagif Mustafazadeh (1960).
- Meykhana – literary and folk rap tradition, consisting of an unaccompanied song performed by one or more people improvising on a particular subject.
- Mugham – folk musical composition from Azerbaijan.

=== Musical Instruments ===
- Balaban – a cylindrical-bore, double-reed wind instrument.
- Nagara (drum) – folk drum with double head that is played on one side with the bare hands.
- Tar – Mirza Sadig (1870).

== Language and literature ==
- School for Muslim girls during Russian Empire. Zeynalabdin Taghiyev (1904)

== Sports ==
- Sur-papakh – traditional equestrian sport.
