= Always (Aziza Mustafa Zadeh album) =

Studio album by Aziza Mustafa Zadeh
- Released: 1993
- Genre: Jazz/mugam fusion
- Length: 63:48
- Label: Columbia

Aziza Mustafa Zadeh chronology
| Aziza Mustafa Zadeh (1991) | Always (1993) | Dance of Fire (1995) |

Always is the second album released by the Azeri jazz artist Aziza Mustafa Zadeh. It was released in 1993.

== Music ==
"Vagif" is dedicated to the memory of Zadeh's father, the famous Azeri jazz musician and the founder of jazz-mugam, Vagif Mustafazadeh. "Crying Earth" is a dedication to all who died in the Khojaly Massacre on 25 February 1992 during the First Nagorno-Karabakh War.

== Track listing ==
1. "Always" – 4:39
2. "Heartbeat" – 7:37
3. "Crying Earth" – 6:29
4. "A.J.D." – 6:19
5. "Yandi Ganim Daha" – 7:30
6. "I Don't Know" – 4:59
7. "Vagif" – 6:02
8. "Marriage Suite" – 5:49
9. "Insult" – 4:07
10. "Kaukas Mountains" – 4:53
11. "Dangerous Piece" – 5:24

== Personnel ==
- Aziza Mustafa Zadeh – piano, vocals
- John Patitucci – acoustic bass, 6-string electric bass guitar
- Dave Weckl – drums
