= Festivals in Azerbaijan =

Part of the culture of Azerbaijan

The festivals in Azerbaijan are held throughout the year in different regions of the country. The city of Baku is considered as the most important center of the festivals due to their scale and types. The festivals in each region, on the other hand, represent its own local characteristics mostly related to its food, fruit and so on.

== Baku International Jazz Festival ==
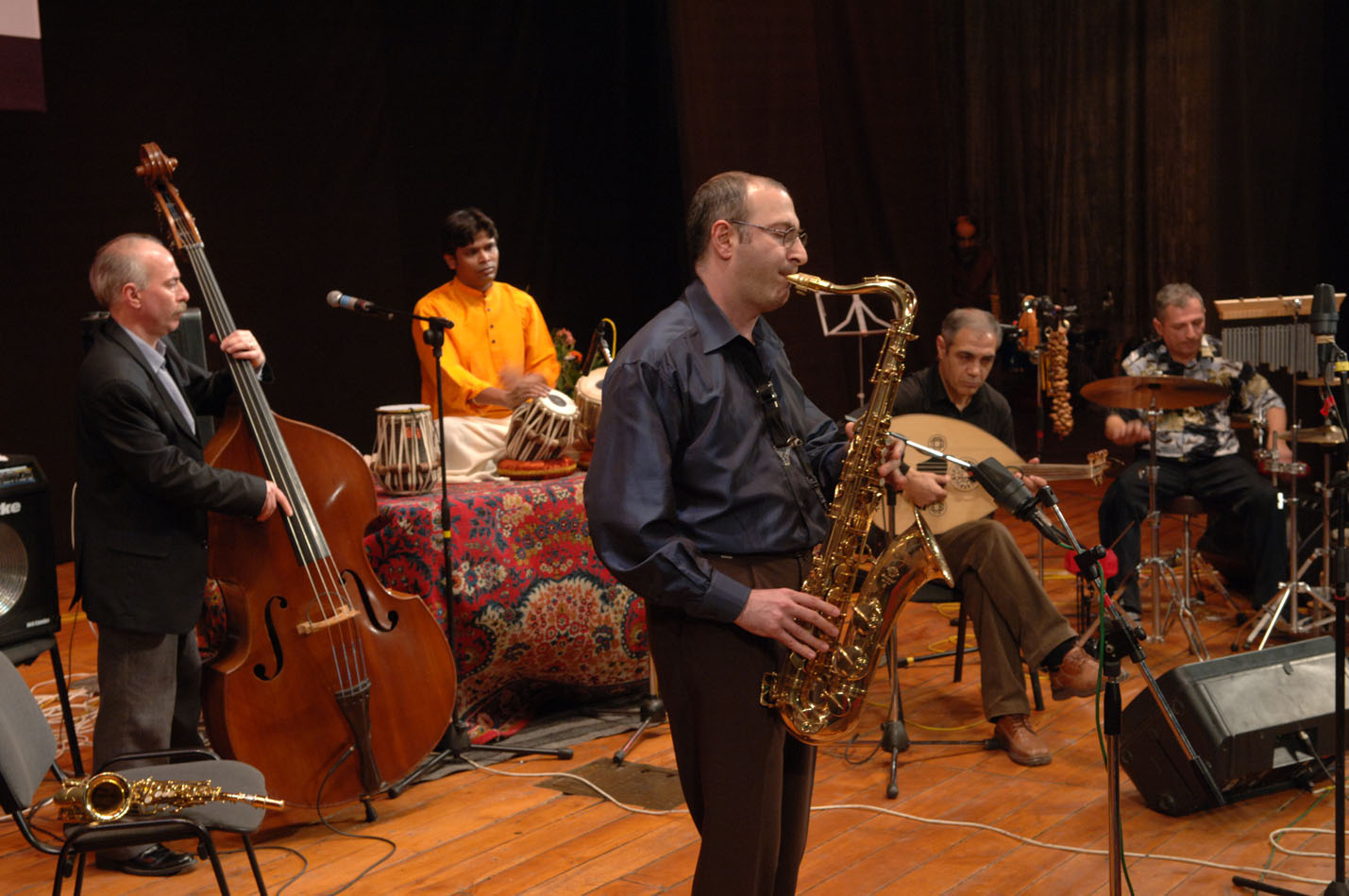
Rain Sultanov Group & Udai Mazumdar Baku JAzz Festival 2005

Local jazz musician Rain Sultanov, later joined by 115 members from 34 countries, set up the Baku International Jazz Festival, a musical festival that includes seminars and masterclasses, with a schedule of jazz performances and concerts. There is a competition for the "Best Jazz Performer" award, and exhibitions of art and photography. Attendees and contributors include many widely-known jazz performers from around the world.

The festival is included in the Europe Jazz Network and has been held annually in Baku since 2005.

== Gabala Music Festival ==
The Gabala International Music Festival is held since 2009. It includes an international contest of young pianists, mugham, classical music, chamber music, jazz and other concerts. During the event, Gabala hosts internationally famous symphonic and philharmonic orchestras all around the world such as Tbilisi City Hall Jazz Orchestra "BIG-BAND (Georgia), Jóvenes Clásicos Del Son (Cuba), Baku Chamber Orchestra (Azerbaijan), and Jerusalem Symphony Orchestra (Israel). The participators of the festival usually play the world-known works of Rachmaninoff, Strauss, Brahms, Schumann, Uzeyir Hajibeyov, Tofig Guliyev and Vagif Mustafazade and other famous composers.

== Pomegranate Festival ==
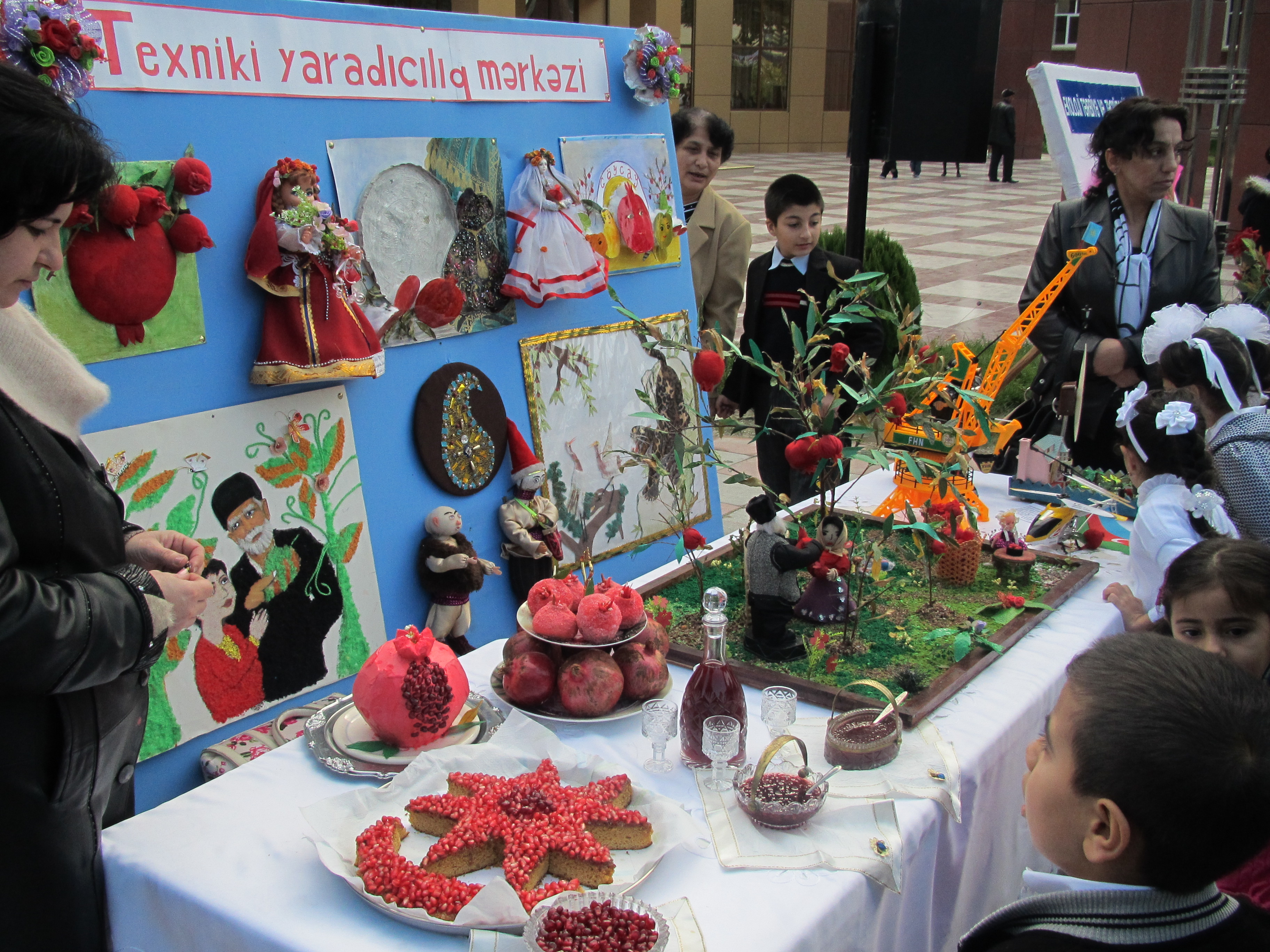
Pomegranate Festival is an annual cultural festival that is held in Goychay, Azerbaijan.

The Pomegranate Festival is held in Goychay district in autumn since 2006. During the event different varieties of pomegranates (Veles, Shirin, Gyuleysha and Shihbaba) and pomegranate products such as narsharab, juice concentrates, jam, jelly, grenadine, wine, seeds in syrup are displayed in the exhibition. The festival also includes multiple ceremonies, competitions, dancing events, fairs, parades, performances, etc. Goychay Pomegranate Festival was inscribed in 2020 on the Representative List of the Intangible Cultural Heritage of Humanity.

== Apple Festival ==
The Apple Festival takes place in Guba district (northern part of the republic of Azerbaijan). The festival is mainly devoted to display various fruits and most importantly apples produced within the district. The event also comprises several competitions, such as "the biggest apple" or "the most delicious apple jam".

== Gara Garayev International Music Festival ==
The Gara Garayev International Music Festival is dedicated to the famous Azerbaijani composer Gara Garayev and takes place every two years. It is co-organized by Azerbaijan's Ministry of Culture and the country's Permanent Mission to UNESCO. The participants of the festival is also familiarized with a photo exhibition and documentary films about the composer's life and works. The Gara Garayev International Music Festival was first held in 1986 with the initiatives of composers Faradzh Karayev, Oleg Felzer and conductor Rauf Abdullayev.

== Uzeyir Hajibeyov International Music Festival ==
The Uzeyir Hajibeyov International Music Festival, dedicated to the Azerbaijani composer Uzeyir Hajibeyov takes place in September, since 2009, in different cities of Azerbaijan and major events are held in Baku. The festival is promoted by the Ministry of Culture and Tourism together with the Heydar Aliyev Foundation.

== "Mugham World" International Mugham Festival ==
The International World of Mugham Festival was decided to be held in 2009 with the support of the Heydar Aliyev Foundation. In 2015, the festival brought together musicians from 40 countries (US, Turkey, China, Iran, Uzbekistan, Iraq, Jordan, Kuwait, Morocco, etc.).

== Maiden Tower International Art Festival ==
The Maiden Tower International Art Festival is held annually starting from 2010 in Baku, Icheri Sheher. In the first festival there were over 20 artists from 18 countries. On July 4, 2013, the opening ceremony of the 4th Maiden Tower International Art Festival was held at La Croisette Boulevard in Cannes, France. The festival aimed to draw attention to the endangered gazelles, therefore, artists decorated the models of these animals together with traditional models of the Maiden Tower. The 6th Maiden Tower International Art Festival was held on June 11–14, 2015 in Icheri Sheher. In the event, artists decorated the models of pomegranate and gazelle, which were the symbols of the first European Games “Baku-2015”.

== Hazelnut Festival ==
The Hazelnut Festival takes place in autumn annually since 2017 in Zagatala district which is known as the "Hazelnut capital of Azerbaijan" among locals. Numerous hazelnut products in addition to varieties of hazelnut, chestnut and walnut are displayed in the exhibition. The festival also features different kinds of events, such as painting and handicraft exhibitions and contests, as well as field trips to the hazelnut garden in the Parzivan area of the Zagatala experimental station and the walnut processing plant of Azersun.

== Other festivals ==
- The Kata Festival is organized annually in Nakhchivan. Kata (Azerbaijani: kətə), a flat pie with greens is made with shomu (wild spinach), mixed greens, desert candle, pumpkin, asphodel, nettle, bean or lentil in a dough wrapped in the shape of an envelope and cooked in a tandir. The Kata Festival is aimed to show and promote the preparation manner of various types of the kata specific to different regions of the Nakhchivan Autonomous Republic. The festival is held at the Historical-Architectural Museum Complex "Nakhchivangala" in April.
- The Grape and Wine Festival is held in Meysari village in the Shamakhi District, which is recognized as the wine and grape growing capital of Azerbaijan, in August 2019 by the support of the Heydar Aliyev Foundation. The festival aims to encourage local grape and wine production, and to promote the history of wine production in Azerbaijan. The festival features a wine exhibition, a parade of wine producers, exhibition of different types of folk art of Azerbaijani districts including copper craft, carpet weaving and pottery.
- The Persimmon Festival is held annually since 2017. This festival is organized in Balakan in October–November when the most delicious persimmon grows. In the festival, different varieties of persimmon, culinary products and different recipes and dishes featuring persimmon are displayed. It also features a field trip to the persimmon garden in the Gerekli village and the planting of persimmon trees.

== See also ==
- Novruz in Azerbaijan
- Public holidays in Azerbaijan
