= Leyla Efendiyeva =

Azerbaijani magazine editor and jazz festival director

Leyla Efendiyeva Leyla Əfəndiyeva
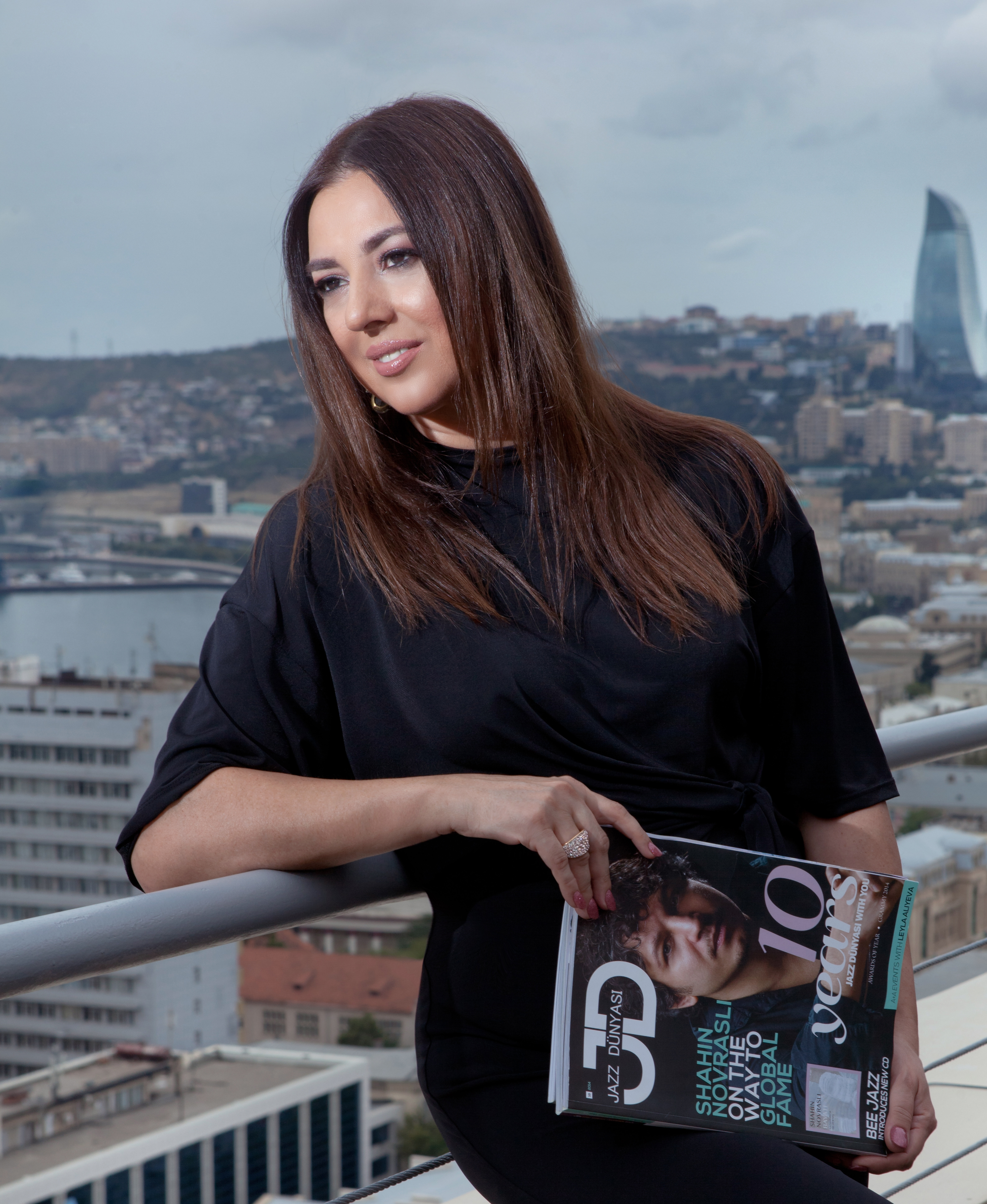

Background information
- Also known as: Leyla Efendi
- Genre: Jazz
- Occupations: Journalist; magazine editor; concert presenter; festival director; Writer
- Years active: 2004–present
- Spouse: Rain Sultanov
- Website: bakujazzfestival.com

Leyla Efendiyeva (Azerbaijani: Leyla Əfəndiyeva), also known as Leyla Efendi, is an Azerbaijani journalist, magazine editor, writer, and jazz festival director. She is the director of the Baku International Jazz Festival and editor-in-chief of Jazz Dünyası ("Jazz World"), a magazine devoted to jazz in Azerbaijan.

== Career ==
Efendiyeva and her husband, Azerbaijani saxophonist Rain Sultanov, worked together to establish the Baku Jazz Centre and launch Jazz Dünyası. According to All About Jazz, Efendiyeva guided the redesign of the centre and, together with Sultanov, contacted foreign embassies while developing the event that became the Baku Jazz Festival.

The festival was launched in 2005. Sultanov is its founder and artistic director, while Efendiyeva serves as its director.

In its coverage of the 2017 festival, Euronews identified Efendiyeva as the festival's director and quoted her discussing its programming of jazz, funk, and ethno-jazz. The festival joined the Europe Jazz Network that year, becoming the network's first member from Azerbaijan. Euronews again interviewed Efendiyeva during its coverage of the 2018 festival.

Efendiyeva has also served as project director of I Am Jazzman!, a competition for young jazz performers held as part of the Baku Jazz Festival.

== Publishing and international activity ==
Efendiyeva is the editor-in-chief of Jazz Dünyası, which International Jazz Day describes as Azerbaijan's first printed periodical devoted to jazz. In a 2022 interview with Baku magazine, she discussed Azerbaijani jazz, the return of concerts following the COVID-19 pandemic, and a special issue of Jazz Dünyası prepared for International Jazz Day.

Efendiyeva and Sultanov first presented Jazz Dünyası at jazzahead!, the international jazz trade fair in Bremen, in 2005, and subsequently returned to promote Azerbaijani jazz musicians. Efendiyeva and Sultanov have also participated in International Jazz Day activities through the Baku Jazz Festival since 2015.

== Literary work ==
Writing under the name Leyla Efendi, Efendiyeva published the Russian-language novel Кольцо с рубином (lit. 'The Ruby Ring') in 2024.
