= Jazz mugham =

Azerbaijani fusion genre

The Jazz mugham (also known as Mugham jazz) (Azerbaijani: Caz-muğam) is a variant of a musical fusion genre that developed from mixing Azerbaijani jazz with mugham, typically instrumental compositions with a jazz approach to lengthy group improvisations, often using wind and vocal music and displaying a high level of instrumental technique.

== History ==
Vagif Mustafazadeh is credited with fusing jazz with mugham. Mustafazadeh integrated two different ways of musical thinking by conjoining mugham with rich jazz harmony, fusing familiar motifs with swing, using both jazz and mugham types of melodic elaboration Mustafazadeh learned the classical jazz repertoire from recordings by the help of the characteristics of the oral transmission of mugham. After the death of Mustafa Zadeh, his daughter, Aziza Mustafazadeh made popular jazz mugham in Europe, where she issued seven recordings.

The style reached its full fame in the 1950s and 1960s under the influence of composer Rafig Babayev and his Gaya Quartet. Dizzy Gillespie, the legendary American jazz trumpeter, reportedly lauded Mustafazadeh for creating "the music of the future."

== See also ==
- Azerbaijani folk music
- Meykhana
- Music of Azerbaijan
- Culture of Azerbaijan
