= Dance of fire (disambiguation) =

Dance of fire may refer to:

- a fire performance including fire.
- Dance of Fire, a 1995 album by Aziza Mustafa Zadeh.
- Dance of Fire or La danza del fuego, a 1949 Argentinian film.
- Ritual Fire Dance or Danza ritual del fuego, a movement in the 1915 ballet El amor brujo by Manuel de Falla.
