= Maiden Tower (festival) =

Annual festival in Azerbaijan

The Maiden Tower Art Festival is an annual festival made to promote one of the ancient buildings of Baku, Maiden Tower, which is located in Icheri Sheher.

The main art works are dedicated to Azerbaijan's symbols: Maiden Tower, Gazelles.

== History of the festival ==
The first festival was held on May 26, 2010, by Heydar Aliyev Foundation. The festival was attended by 20 artists from 18 countries.

In 2012, artists from 24 countries attended the festival. It was organized by International Dialogue for Environmental Action to draw attention to extinctive species such as Caucasian gazelle.

The fourth festival was held in Cannes, in La Cruazette. Heydar Aliyev Foundation CEO, mayor of Cannes, Secretary General of the United Nations Philip Dust-Blazi attended the opening ceremony. Totally 26 artists attended the festival.

In May 2014, 28 artists attended the festival, where artists presented street arts as well.

The seventh international festival was named as “Maiden tower art festival for children” and held in September 2016. Some of the works were presented in Eiffel Tower, France.

The festival is held every year in Baku, Icheri Sheher.

== Maiden Tower ==
Maiden tower is a monument, which is one of the national symbols of Azerbaijan. In 2001, the Maiden Tower was included in the UNESCO World Heritage list.

There are many hypotheses and legends about Maiden tower, and yet building's true purpose is unknown. Some hypothesis state that it was Zoroastrian Temple, some state that it was a lighthouse.

Tower's height is 29.5 meters and its base diameter is 16.5 meters.

== See also ==
- Festivals in Azerbaijan
- List of World Heritage Sites in Azerbaijan
