= Seventh Truth =

Studio album by Aziza Mustafa Zadeh
- Released: 1996
- Genre: Jazz/Mugam fusion
- Length: 57:01
- Label: Columbia

Aziza Mustafa Zadeh chronology
Dance of Fire (1995)	Seventh Truth (1996)	Jazziza (1997)

Seventh Truth is the fourth album by the Azeri jazz musician Aziza Mustafa Zadeh. It was released by Columbia Records in 1996. Zadeh reported that the cover caused some controversy in Azerbaijan because it featured nudity; she responded: "Why all the fuss? Maybe some women are jealous, or maybe they're too fat to appear like that themselves. Or maybe they're deaf and can't really comprehend what's going on in the music."

== Track listing ==
1. "Ay Dilber" – 5:27
2. "Lachin" – 3:45
3. "Interlude I" – 2:08
4. "Fly With Me" – 7:09
5. "F#" – 4:18
6. "Desperation" – 6:23
7. "Daha...(again)" – 4:55
8. "I Am Sad" – 4:57
9. "Interlude II" – 0:29
10. "Wild Beauty" – 4:36
11. "Seventh Truth" – 4:42
12. "Sea Monster" – 8:12

== Personnel ==
- Aziza Mustafa Zadeh - vocals, grand piano and congas
- Ramesh Shotham - drums and Indian percussion
