= Rauf Babayev =

Azerbaijani tenor singer (1937–2020)

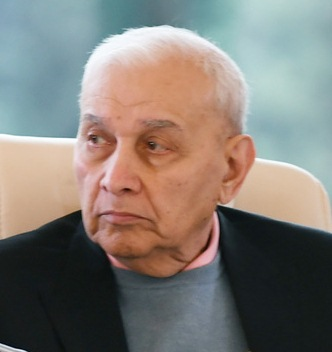

Background information
- Born: December 30, 1937; Leninakan, Armenian SSR, USSR
- Died: March 27, 2020 (aged 82) Baku, Azerbaijan
- Genres: folk music, jazz
- Occupation: singer
- Years active: 1961–2020
- Formerly of: Gaya Quartet
- Burial place: II Alley of Honor
- Education: Hajibeyov Azerbaijan State Conservatoire
- Awards

Rauf Yusuf oghlu Babayev (Azerbaijani: Rauf Yusuf oğlu Babayev, December 30, 1937 – March 27, 2020) was an Azerbaijani singer (tenor), People's Artiste of Azerbaijan (2006).

== Biography ==
Rauf Babayev was born on December 30, 1937, in Leninakan. After graduating from high school in Baku, he studied at the Asaf Zeynalli Music School in 1953–1957, and in 1957–1962 he received higher music education in the percussion class of the Hajibeyov Azerbaijan State Conservatoire.

Rauf Babayev, who started his career as a musician in the Azerbaijan State Academic Russian Drama Theatre in 1957, was a soloist-vocalist in the Azerbaijan State Variety-Symphonic Orchestra in 1960–1962, worked as a soloist in the Azerbaijan State Philharmonic in 1962–1964, and in the Dagestani Philharmonic Orchestra in 1965.

From 1965, he sealed his creative destiny with the pop ensemble "Gaya." Until 1968, he was the vocalist of the pop ensemble "Gaya" of the Azerbaijan State Philharmonic. In 1987–2001 he was the soloist-vocalist of the state ensemble "Gaya", and in 1987–2001 he was the soloist-vocalist of the state pop-symphonic orchestra "Gaya" under the Baku City Culture Department. Since 2001, he has worked as the director and artistic director of the "Gaya" state orchestra, since 2003 of the "Bəri bax" vocal group of the "Gaya" state ensemble, and since 2007 as the artistic director of the State "Gaya" Ensemble of the Ministry of Culture of Azerbaijan.

Rauf Babayev is one of the founders of the vocal-instrumental ensemble "Gaya", which was considered one of the most famous bands of the Azerbaijani pop scene in the 60s and 80s of the last century. The artist has performed at a number of jazz festivals, and won the title of laureate of international pop and jazz music competitions.

Rauf Babayev died on March 27, 2020, in Baku. He was buried in II Alley of Honor.

== Awards ==
- Honored Artist of the Azerbaijan SSR — January 11, 1978
- People's Artiste of Azerbaijan — September 16, 2006
- Shohrat Order — December 28, 2017
