= Teymur Mirzoyev =

Teymur Mirzoyev Teymur Mirzəyev
- Born: 1936; Aghdam, Aghdam District, Azerbaijan SSR, USSR
- Died: 27 September 2021 (aged 84–85) Israel
- Occupation: Singer
- Formerly of: Gaya Quartet

Teymur Ibrahim oghlu Mirzoyev (Azerbaijani: Teymur İbrahim oğlu Mirzəyev, 1936 — 27 September 2021) was an Azerbaijani singer, artistic director of Gaya Quartet, People's Artiste of Azerbaijan (1993).

== Biography ==
Teymur Mirzoyev was born in 1936 in Aghdam. He graduated from the choir-conductor faculty of the Azerbaijan State Conservatoire. In 1961, he created the Gaya Quartet became the artistic director and soloist of the ensemble. The Gaya ensemble, a laureate of All-Union and International competitions, was one of the well-known collectives in the territory of the USSR and many foreign countries.

Together with the collective, he toured in Germany, Austria, America, Turkey, India, Africa, Czechoslovakia, Israel, Canada, Georgia, and Ukraine.

Teymur Mirzoyev, who lived in Israel for a long time, died on 27 September 2021, at the age of 85.

== Awards ==
- People's Artiste of Azerbaijan — 23 January 1993
- Honored Artist of the Azerbaijan SSR — 11 January 1978
