= Aziza Mustafa Zadeh (album) =

Studio album by Aziza Mustafa Zadeh
- Released: November 1991
- Studio: Bauer Studios (Ludwigsburg)
- Genre: Jazz
- Length: 1:13:46
- Label: Columbia
- Producer: Ingo Werner, Reinhard Karwatky

Aziza Mustafa Zadeh chronology
Aziza Mustafa Zadeh (1991)	Always (1993)

Professional ratings
Review scores
Source	Rating
AllMusic	4/5 stars

Aziza is the first album by Aziza Mustafa Zadeh. It was released by Columbia Records in 1991.

== Music ==
Zadeh wrote all fifteen of the tracks on the album. She sings on three of them.

== Release and reception ==
Aziza Mustafa Zadeh was released by Columbia Records in November 1991. The AllMusic reviewer wrote: "the virtuosic pianist clearly has the potential to be a major force in jazz. At this early stage, Aziza already had something of her own to offer".

Jazz: The Rough Guide described it as a "beautiful unaccompanied album", and added that "Anyone who feared that the world-music movement would necessarily bypass keyboard instruments must think again".

== Track listing ==
1. "Quiet Alone" – 3:31
2. "Tea on the Carpet" – 4:03
3. "Cemetery" – 6:47
4. "Inspiration" – 4:37
5. "Reflection" – 4:07
6. "Oriental Fantasy" – 11:16
7. "Blue Day" – 4:16
8. "Character" – 5:16
9. "Aziza's Dream" – 4:50
10. "Chargah" – 5:09
11. "My Ballad" – 4:17
12. "I Cannot Sleep" – 6:46
13. "Moment" – 0:47
14. "Exprompt" – 2:02
15. "Two Candles" – 5:57

== Musicians ==
- Aziza Mustafa Zadeh - piano, vocals
