= Sur-papakh =

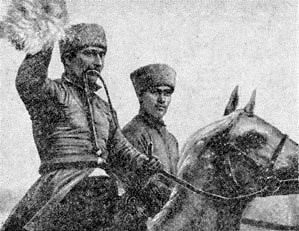

Sur-papakh is an Azerbaijani sport played on horseback.

== Rules ==
Sur-papakh is played between two teams of four to eight riders each on a field that is 300 to 400 metres (980 to 1,310 ft) long. The game is divided into two ten-minute halves. The object of the game is to pass a papakha (sheepskin hat) between the riders until the hat can be thrown through a ring-shaped goal similar to a basketball hoop. The opposing team attempts to intercept the hat (but may not physically contact opposing riders) to prevent the goal from being scored.

== Variations ==
Several variations of the game exist:

- A children's game, in which the hat is replaced with a ball, and the children run on the field rather than riding on horseback.
- A version played on horseback in which the goal of the game is to steal the opposing team's hats.
