= Gaya Quartet =

Azerbaijani vocal quartet

- Gaya Quartet performing

Background information
- Origin: Baku, Azerbaijani SSR, Soviet Union
- Genre: Jazz
- Years active: 1972–88
- Past members: Arif Hajiev, Teymur Mirzoyev, Rauf Babayev, Lev Yelisavetskiy

“Gaya“ (Azerbaijani: Qaya) were an Azerbaijani vocal quartet consisting of Arif Hajiyev, Teymur Mirzoyev, Lev Yelisovetski, and Rauf Babayev. The quartet was active from 1972 to 1988. They sang in multiple languages, including Azerbaijani, Spanish, Polish, Ukrainian, Russian, and English, in their repertoire. Gaya was formed in 1961, when Rauf Hajiyev invited musicians to work in the Azerbaijan State Estrada Orchestra. Such composers as Tofig Guliyev, Fikret Amirov, Rauf Hajiyev, Vasif Adigozalov, Faraj Garayev and Tofig Babayev worked with “Gaya”.

== History of the group ==
=== Appearance of “Gaya” ===
The quartet changed its membership several times during its existence period. The great successes of “Gaya” are related with the names of Teymur Mirzoyev, Arif Hajiyev, Rauf Babayev, and Lev Yelisovetski. Teymur Mirzoyev, artistic manager of the quartet, wished to create his own jazz group from his childhood. He studied with Arif Hajiyev at the chorus-conductor faculty of the musical school named after Asaf Zeynally under the Conservatoire. Besides them, Adil Nazarov and Rauf Babayev were also members of the quartet. Nazarov studied at the string branch of the double bass class, and Rauf Babayev studied at the faculty of percussion instruments. The group didn't have a place for rehearsal. They got together in the yards with good acoustics, where they learned new jazz compositions heard on the radio or recording discs. Sometimes the group performed in birthdays and parties of friends. Soon, they were spoken of by the citizens of Baku. They were offered membership in the symphonic orchestra of State Broadcasting Company of the Azerbaijan SSR. Refusing the first time, they accepted a private offer of Rauf Hajiyev, who became the manager of the orchestra till that time. The well-known jazz pianist and arranger Anatoliy Kalvarskiy was invited as musical manager. Such great authors as Boris Sichkin and Arkadiy Arkanov worked on the performance program of the orchestra. Later, Adil Nazarov married and moved to live in Moscow. Lev Yelisovetski became a new member of the group, who often participated in the rehearsals of the group. The members of the group decided to offer him the chance to sing with them. So the quartet was created with its most popular membership. The first songs, which were sung by singers in the orchestra, were Rauf Hajiyev's "Baku," Aziz Azizov's “Tez gel yar” in Azerbaijani, and the “Anxious youth” song in Russian. “Gaya” had tours in many cities of the USSR with the orchestra and had its first tour overseas—in Algeria.

Soon, the quartet parted with the Estrada Orchestra. After that, Murad Kajlayev-artistic director of Makhachkala Philarmony, who had a great role in the Dagestan composer-school and was born and grew up in Baku, became interested in them. Murad Kajlayev studied at Azerbaijan State Conservatoire with many members of the quartet, where Boris Zeydman and Gara Garayev taught him. The quartet accepted the offer to work with them enthusiastically. They moved to Makhachkala and created the first estrade group of Dagestan, "Gunib," which was named after a place in the Dagestan Autonomous Soviet Socialist Republic, with the jazz trio of Rafig Babayev. The main part of the repertoire consisted of the ensemble's artistic director Murad Kajlayev's compositions and also popular folk melodies and modern hit songs. The music was orchestrated by Teymur Mirzoyev and Rafig Babayev, who was the musical manager. “Gunib” had a great success and performed in tours throughout the country. The All-Union firm “Melodiya” released recording discs of the ensemble with general circulation; articles about “Gunib” were published in newspapers and journals. In autumn of 1965, the ensemble was recalled to Baku.

They were out of work for a while. At the end of 1965, they were offered to perform in tours in the Far East with Muslim Magomayev and pianist Chingiz Sadykhov. The quartet went to the four-month tour under the name "Gaya," which means “rock” in Azerbaijani. During the tours, “Gaya” performed in 120 concerts in the Far East cities.

== Competition for vocalists in Moscow ==
A competition of vocalists in 1966, which was held in Moscow, played a great role in the activity of the quartet. “Gaya” prepared 10 songs and gained a victory, in spite of the late invitation to the concert, which had to be held after 15 days. Since then, "Gaya" has been famous in the USSR and has become a cult group.

== The ensemble “Gaya” ==
In 1972, the quartet acquired the status of the state ensemble by the decision of the Soviet Union's government. In this very year “Gaya” decided to create its own show program and invited Mark Rozovskiy and Yuli Gusman to write a script. “Jesus Christ Superstar” a suite of a rock opera, was included in the program. For that reason, a sextet was created—Tamilla Aghamiyeva and Galina Barinova were invited to the group. Rauf Babayev performed Jesus's part, Lev Yelisovetski was Judah, and Galina Barinova was Magdalena. Costumes of the ensemble were made by Vyacheslav Zaitsev. The show had great success throughout the USSR. After that was a new successful program, "Lights of the Big City," the premiere of which was held in the Palace named after Lenin in Baku (now this palace is named after Haydar Aliyev). The program, consisting of a lot of parts, lasted three hours. Azerbaijani folk songs, songs of the USSR nations, and friendship songs for colleagues were performed there. The program was finished with a great sketch of “Old Baku”, with scenes from “Arshin mal alan”, “O olmasin, bu olsun” and others. “Gaya” performed in other cities of the USSR and also in the countries of Eastern Europe with this program. Wherever they had been on a tour, they finished the program with the native song of that very country, and this amazed foreign spectators.

The ensemble performed in Houston, the USA, and then had a tour in Cuba.

== End of the activity ==
The membership of the ensemble began to change very often. In 1985, a new jazz orchestra was originated under "Gaya," and “Gaya” acquired the name of the State Estrade-Symphonic Song Ensemble. Later, a new rock group—"Talisman"—appeared under the ensemble. In 1988, Yelisavetskiy left the ensemble, and later, Teymur Mirzoyev moved to Israel. The quartet ended its activity, and later it was reorganized into the Azerbaijan State Ensemble "Gaya."

In 2009, children's vocal ensemble “Beri bakh” acquired the official status of the State Jazz Ensemble “Gaya”, under the guidance of Rauf Babayev, the former soloist of "Gaya."

== Discography ==
=== Albums ===
External videos
- "Gaya" — Mexico(in Russian)
- "Gaya" — Life, how beautiful you are (in Azerbaijani)
- "Gaya" — Mole (in Azerbaijani)
- "Gaya" — in "Entertainment party", 1966 "Fairytales of Russian forest"
- "Gaya" — Happy song
- "Gaya" — There is not better than this color

Year	Album	Chart positions
Year	Album	^{UK}
1965	"Songs of M.Kajlayev"	
1967	"Vocal Quartet Gaya"	
1970	"Songs of David Tukhmanov"	
1971	"Songs of M.Kajlayev" on R.Gamzatov's poems	
1974	"Gaya Vocal-Instrumental State Orchestra"	
1978	"Horizons 1978-3"	
1978	"Our song"	
2001	"Gaya – 40 Years"	

== See also ==
- Azerbaijani jazz
- Mugham
