= Baku International Jazz Festival =

Annual jazz event

Coordinates: 40°23′43″N 49°52′56″E

The Baku International Jazz Festival is an annual jazz event founded and organized by saxophonist and Baku resident Rain Sultanov. The festival aims to showcase Azerbaijan's long-running attachment to jazz, a connection established in the country during the 1950s and 1960s when jazz was outlawed by Soviet authorities. The festival has welcomed musicians from Georgia, Portugal, Italy, Israel, United States, Germany, Canada, and Russia.

Acts appearing at the inaugural event in April 2005 included the Joe Zawinul Syndicate, Christoph Busse Trio from Germany, and Yakov Okun Quartet from Russia. The fourteen day event included a tribute Azerbaijani jazz musicians Rafig Babayev and his Gaya quartet and pianist Vagif Mustafa Zadeh. At the end of the first festival it was announced that the festival would become an annual event. In 2006 the festival took place from 19 to 27 June and was headlined by Herbie Hancock and Al Jarreau.

== Gallery ==
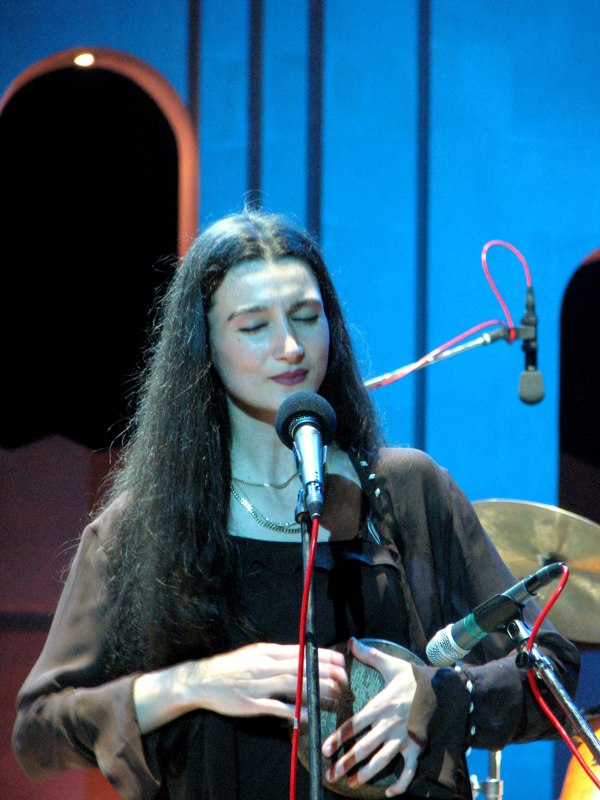
Aziza Mustafa Zadeh 2007

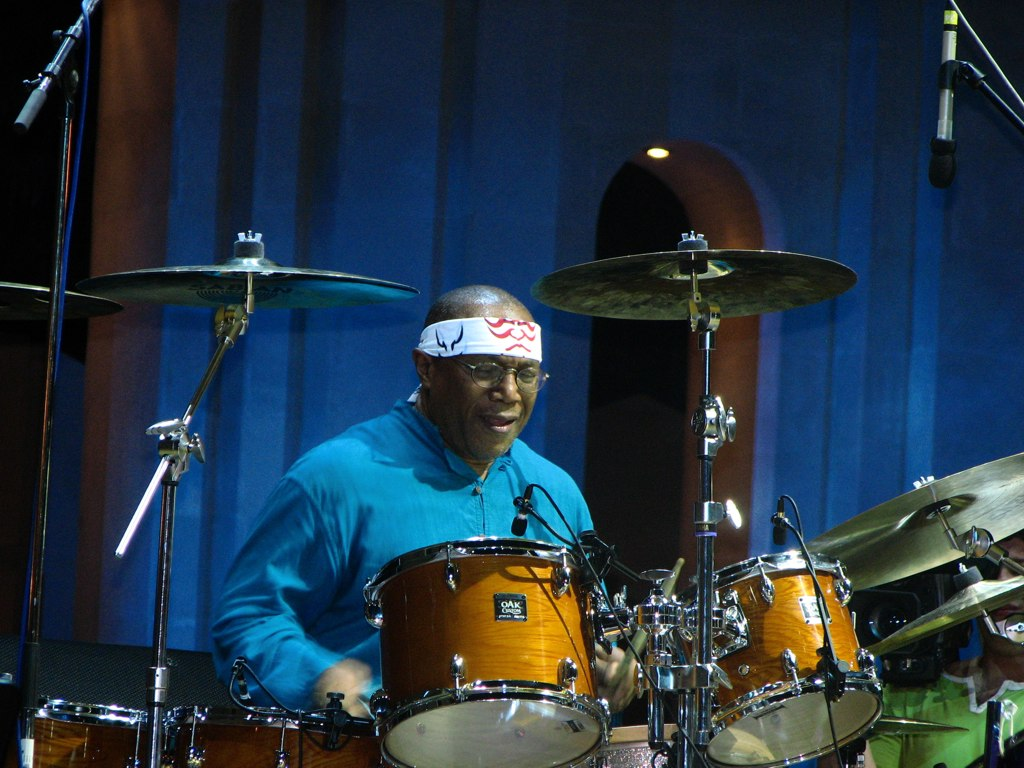
Billy Cobham 2007

Hiram Bullock 2007

Mark Turner 2007

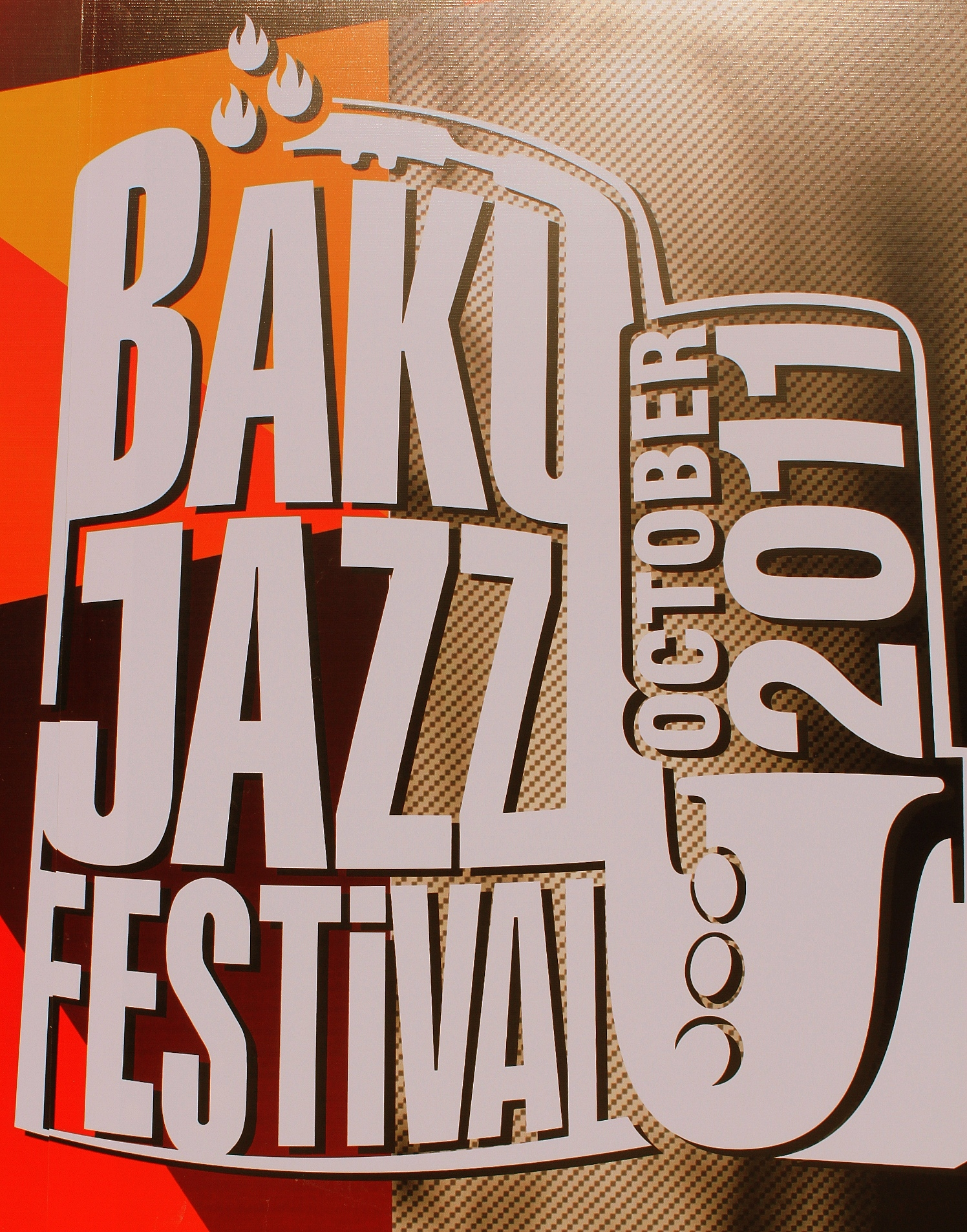
Poster of Baku Jazz Festival 2011

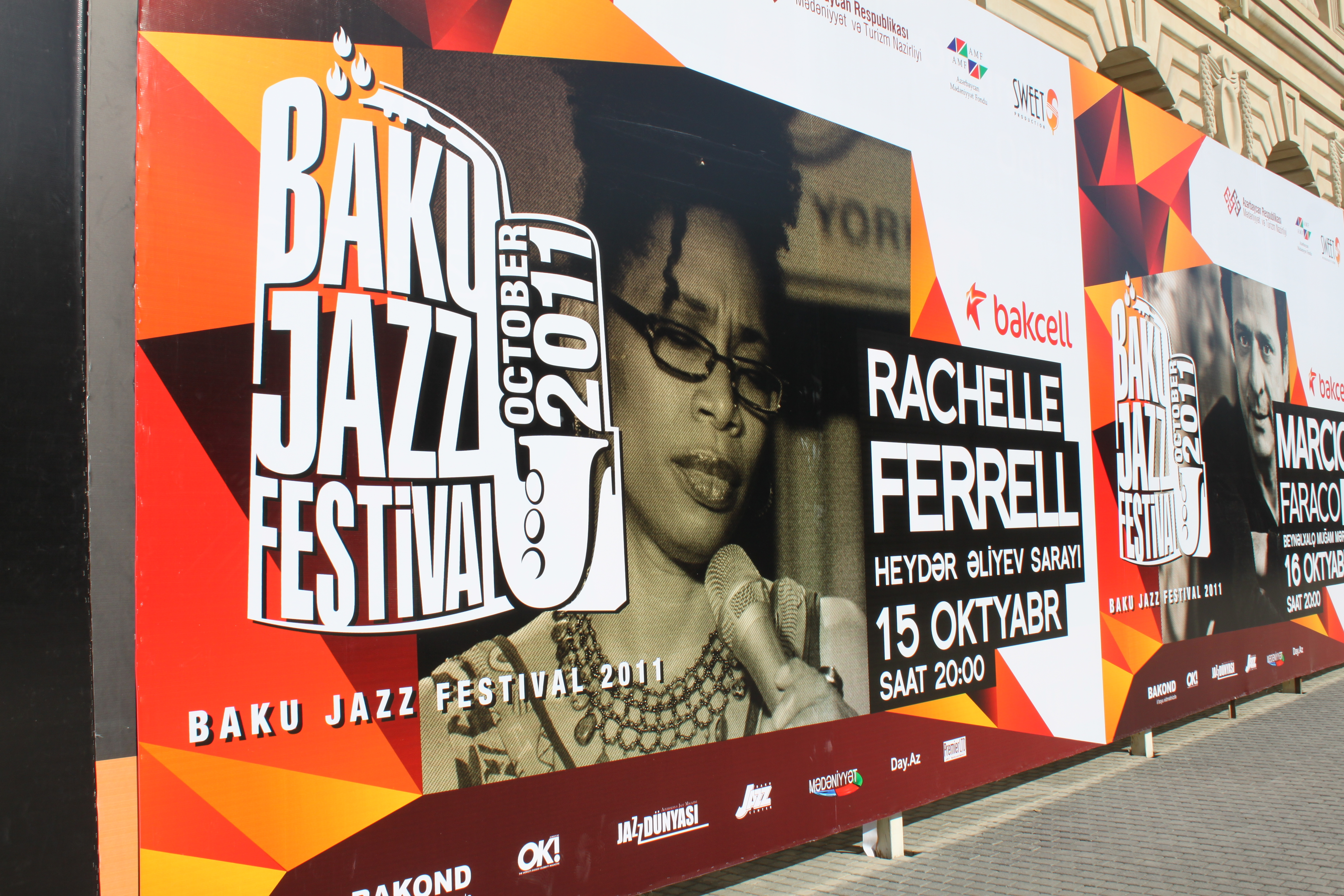
Poster of Baku Jazz Festival 2011

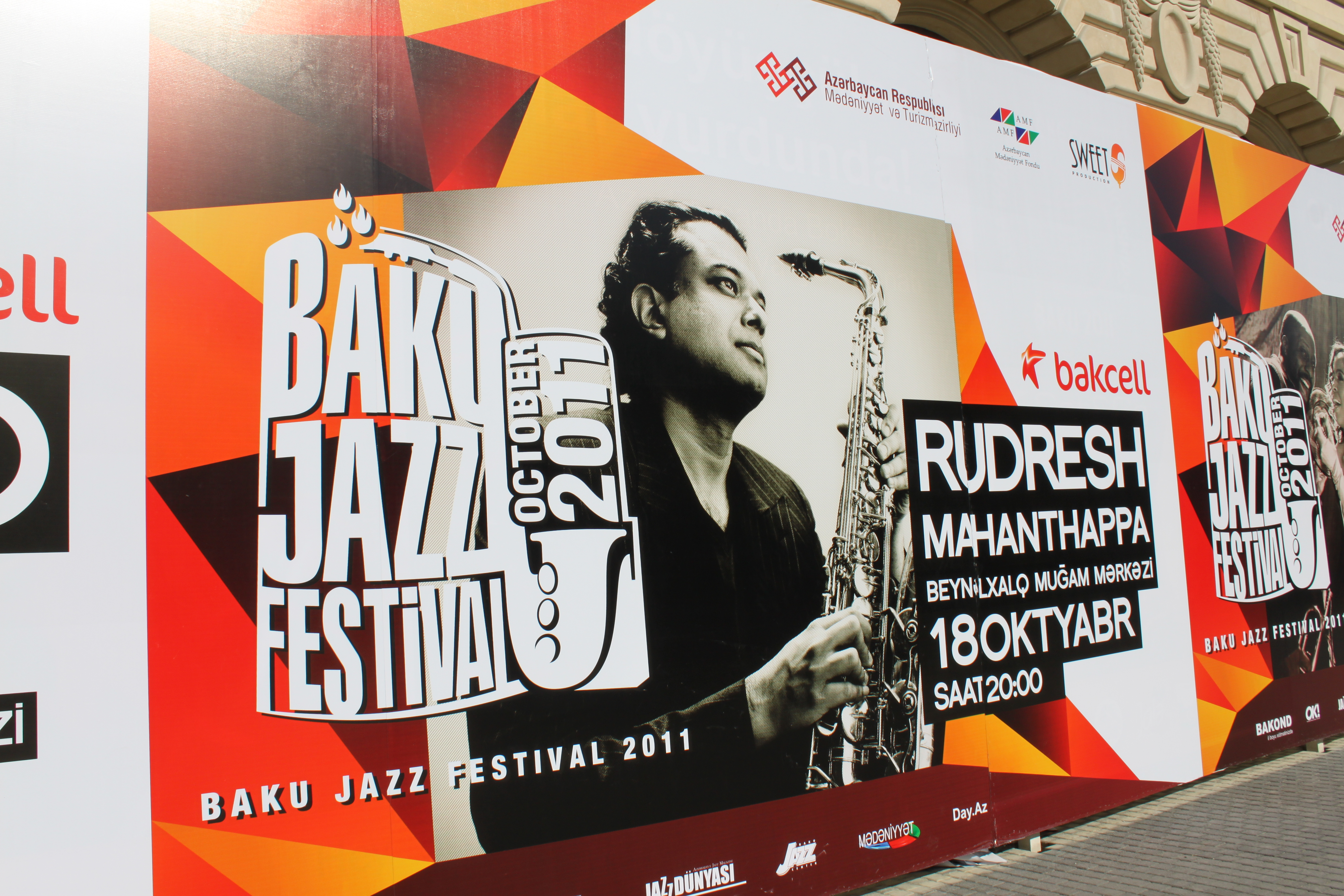
Poster of Baku Jazz Festival 2011
