= Dance of Fire =

Studio album by Aziza Mustafa Zadeh
- Released: 1995
- Recorded: January–February 1995
- Studio: Sony Music Studios, New York
- Genre: Jazz/mugam fusion
- Length: 1:09:42
- Label: Columbia
- Producer: Reinhard Karwatky

Aziza Mustafa Zadeh chronology
Always (1993)	Dance of Fire (1995)	Seventh Truth (1996)

Dance of Fire is the third album released by the Azeri jazz artist Aziza Mustafa Zadeh. It was released in 1995.

== Recording and Music ==
The album was recorded at Sony Music Studios in New York during January and February 1995. It was produced by Reinhard Karwatky. The material "combines be-bop-derived jazz with elements [of] Azerbaijan folk music and Mugham." All of the music was composed and arranged by Zadeh. The collection of songs on Dance of Fire sound both Middle-Eastern and Western.

== Reception ==
Professional ratings
Review scores
Source	Rating
AllMusic	3/5 stars

The AllMusic reviewer wrote that the pianist's "playing is graceful and fluid, eclipsing her super-star backup musicians." The reviewer for BBC Music Magazine commented: "here is a new slant on the jazz vocal, just when you thought everything had been said on the subject".

== Track listing ==
1. "Boomerang" – 4:24
2. "Dance of Fire" – 6:02
3. "Sheherezadeh" – 2:52
4. "Aspiration" – 2:23
5. "Bana Bana Gel (Bad Girl)" – 12:32
6. "Shadow" – 5:54
7. "Carnival" – 7:29
8. "Passion" – 7:10
9. "Spanish Picture" – 9:00
10. "To Be Continued" – 5:59
11. "Father" – 5:57

== Personnel ==
- Aziza Mustafa Zadeh – piano, vocals
- Al Di Meola – acoustic guitar
- Bill Evans – soprano sax, tenor sax
- Stanley Clarke – acoustic bass guitar, electric bass guitar
- Kai E. Karpeh De Camargo – 5-string electric bass guitar
- Omar Hakim – drums
