= Isfar Sarabski =

Azerbaijani pianist and composer (born 1989)

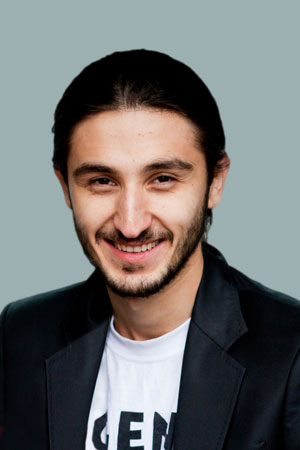
Isfar Rzayev-Sarabski - Azerbaijani pianist, composer.

Isfar Rzayev-Sarabski (Azerbaijani: İsfar Aydın oğlu Rzayev-Sarabski; born 2 November 1989, Baku, Azerbaijan) is an Azerbaijani pianist and composer, winner of the Solo Piano Competition of the Montreux Jazz Festival in 2009, Honorary Artist of Azerbaijan (2010), and receiver of the Zirva State Prize (2010). He is the great-grandson of Huseyngulu Sarabski, celebrated Azerbaijani opera singer, actor and one of the founders of opera in the Islamic world.

== Musical career ==
He graduated from the Baku Music Academy and is currently studying at the Berklee College of Music. Sarabski has performed in the most prestigious concert halls, including the Royal Albert Hall, the Queen Elizabeth Hall, the Miles Davis Hall, the Vibrato Jazz Club, Jazz Club Ronnie Scott's, the Zinco Jazz Club, the Konzerthaus, Asphalt Jazz Club, Duc des Lombards Jazz Club, Porgy & Bess Jazz Club, Bird’s Eye Jazz Club and the Apollo Theater.

He has played in festivals in Switzerland, Norway, France, Russia, and Georgia, as well as the UNESCO headquarters in Paris for ‘International Jazz Day’ with Herbie Hancock and Friends 2012, and "The International Jazz Day All-Star Global Concert 2015" that was much appreciated by the UNESCO Director-General Irina Bokova In 2012-2013 he performed at the gala concert in New York City by the Jazz Foundation of America. In July 2022, Sarabski played at Jazz a Sete festival in France, where he also performed a duet with Grammy Award winner Herbie Hancock again.

In 2011, he formed the Isfar Sarabski Trio with Moscow-based musicians Alexander Mashin (drums) and Makar Novikov (bass). The trio has performed in many festivals and concert venues across North America and Europe.

Sarabski has also played with the Royal Philharmonic Orchestra, the Oleg Lundstrem Orchestra, and such musicians as Igor Butman, Rudy Pérez, Mino Cinelu, Terri Lyne Carrington, Ben Williams, Mark Guiliana, Alan Hampton, Pat Senatore, Greg Swiller, Erik Klass, Christian Weber, Samuel Rohrer, Malcolm Creese, James Maddren, Dhafer Youssef. He was a part of "Drei Pianisten - Three Pianists" project organized by the ACT label with Leszek Możdżer and Iiro Rantala at the Berlin Philharmonic.

Some of his own compositions include: Planet, Novruz, G-Man, Generation, The Edge, DejaVu, Melancholy Evening, Last Chance, Prelude, Agent, Revival, Eastern Market, Now I’m Here, Transit, Buta, Lullaby, Limping Stranger, Cobra Dance, In Memory of Vagif Mustafazadeh.

On July 18, 2009 Isfar became a solo piano award winner at the 43rd Montreux Jazz Festival in Switzerland.

Starting from 2017 in parallel with jazz, an electronic music has become a more recent direction to reflect more on personal moods and private thoughts. Early works include Root, Planet, Le Vent Nous Portera, White Sign, November

In August 2019 Isfar Sarabski signed a contract with the Warner Music Group Germany to release two albums in two different genres Jazz and Electronic.

His debut Jazz album "Planet" was released on 30 April 2021 and is available in digital, CD and 2 x Vinyl LP formats, as well as in music platforms.
