= Aziza Mustafa Zadeh =

Azerbaijani singer, pianist, and composer (born 1969)

Aziza Mustafa Zadeh Əzizə Mustafazadə
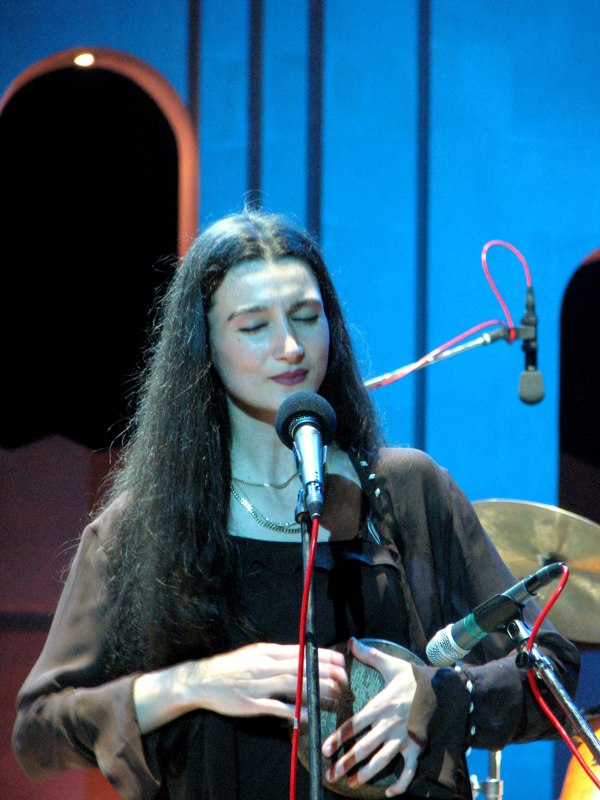
- Aziza plays her "Shamans" song at Baku Jazz Festival 2007 - Final Concert

Background information
- Born: 19 December 1969 (age 56); Baku, Azerbaijan SSR
- Genres: Jazz, jazz fusion
- Instruments: Vocals, piano, mugham
- Years active: 1988–present
- Website: www.azizamustafazadeh.de

Aziza Mustafa Zadeh (Azerbaijani: Əzizə Mustafazadə; born December 19, 1969) is an Azerbaijani singer, pianist, and composer who plays a fusion of jazz and mugham (a traditional improvisational style of Azerbaijan) with classical and avant-garde influences.

== Biography ==
Aziza was born in Baku to musical parents Vagif and Elza Mustafa Zadeh (née Bandzeladze).

Aziza's parents first noticed their daughter's sensitivity to music when she was eight months old. Aziza recalls the story as her mother tells it:

Once, my father was improvising at the piano playing in the mugham mode known as 'Shur', which creates a mood that evokes very deep, sad emotions. As my father was playing, I started to cry. Everyone wondered what was happening to me. Why was I crying? And then mother realized the correlation between my feelings and the music. 'Vagif, please,' she told my father, 'change the scale. Go to Rast. Play Rast.' And he did. Now 'Rast' is characterized by its joyfulness and optimism. And sure enough, with tears still running down my cheeks, I started to make dance-like movements. And Mom pointed out, 'Look, look what she's doing! Change back to Shur!' And when he did, I started crying again louder than before. At least, that's what they tell me. Back to Rast, and I began dancing again.

Aziza enjoyed all forms of art, especially dancing, painting and singing. At the age of three, she made her stage debut with her father, improvising vocals. She began studying classical piano at an early age, showing special interest in the works of famous composers Johann Sebastian Bach and Frédéric Chopin. Soon thereafter, she showed a growing talent for improvisation.

On December 16, 1979, Aziza's father died of a severe heart attack in Tashkent at the age of 39. In order to help her daughter cope with this blow, Aziza's mother gave up her career as a singer to help nurture her daughter's own musical talents.

In 1988, at the age of 18, Aziza's mugam-influenced style helped her win third place together with American Matt Cooper in the Herbie Hancock Institute of Jazz (formerly Thelonious Monk Institute of Jazz) piano competition in Washington, D.C. It was around this time that she moved to Germany with her mother.

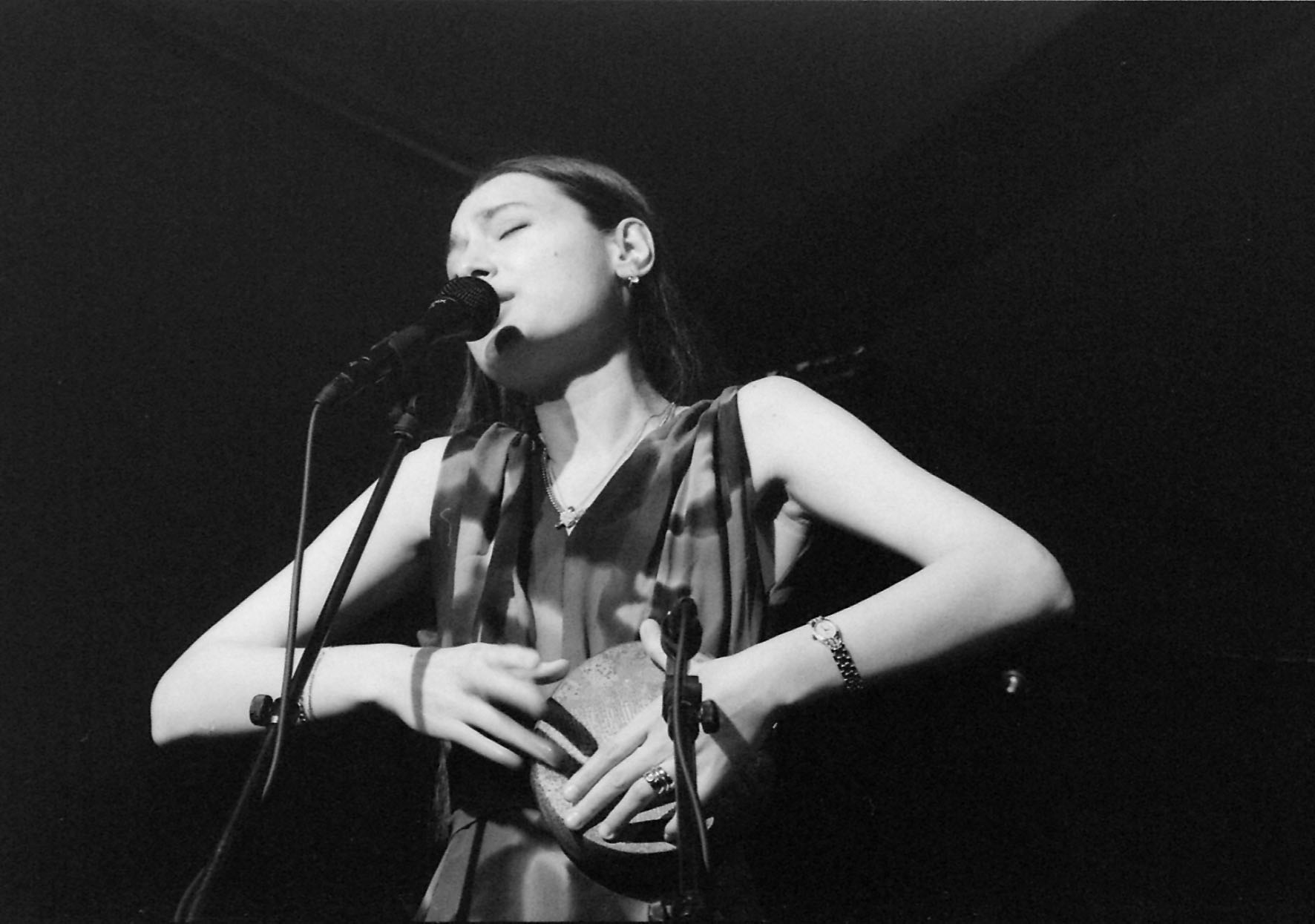
Aziza Mustafa Zadeh in Vilshofen in 1998 at the Jazz an der Donau festival.

Aziza released her debut album, Aziza Mustafa Zadeh, in 1991. The album showed influence of Chick Corea and Keith Jarrett, as well as Near Eastern music. Her second album, Always, won her the Phono Academy Prize, a prestigious German music award, and the Echo Prize from Sony. She has since performed in many countries with many jazz and traditional luminaries and released several more albums, the most recent being Generations, released in 2020.

Aziza currently resides in Mainz, Germany, with her mother, Elza Mustafa Zadeh, who is also her manager. Her two favorite leisure activities, she says, are painting and sleeping. She believes in God, though she does not consider herself as belonging to any religion.

=== Baku Jazz Festival 2007 ===
Aziza visited Azerbaijan in June 2007 for the Baku Jazz Festival, starring in her own concert at the Azerbaijan State Academic Opera and Ballet Theater and headlining the end-of-festival concert at the open-air Green Theater.

== Discography ==
- Aziza Mustafa Zadeh (Columbia, 1991)
- Always (Columbia, 1993)
- Dance of Fire (Columbia, 1995)
- Seventh Truth (Columbia, 1996)
- Jazziza (Columbia, 1997)
- Inspiration – Colors & Reflections (Columbia, 2000)
- Shamans (Decca, 2001)
- Contrasts (Jazziza, 2006)
- Contrasts II (Naturmacht Productions, 2007)
- Generations (Jazziza, 2020)
