= Rauf Hajiyev =

Azerbaijani composer (1922–1995)

- Rauf Hacıyev
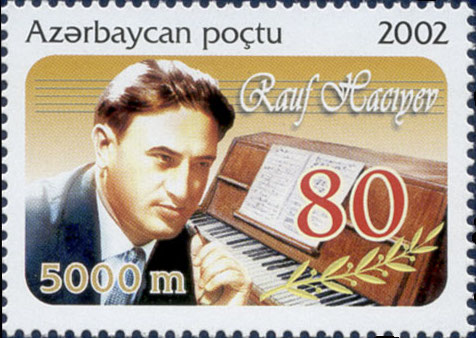
- Hajiyev on a 2002 stamp
- Born: 15 May 1922; Baku, Transcaucasian SFSR, Soviet Union
- Died: 19 September 1995 (aged 73); Baku, Azerbaijan
- Occupations: Composer; politician

Rauf Soltan oghlu Hajiyev (Note: Azerbaijani: Rauf Soltan oğlu Hacıyev; Russian: Рауф Солтан оглы Гаджиев, romanized: Rauf Soltan ogly Gadzhiyev) (15 May 1922 – 19 September 1995) was a Soviet and Azerbaijani composer and politician. He was awarded the honorary title of People's Artist of the USSR (1978). He was Chairman of the Union of Composers of the Azerbaijan SSR, minister of culture of the Azerbaijan SSR (1965–1971).

== Biography ==
Rauf Hajiyev was born on 15 May 1922 in Baku. He wrote his first operetta "Pranks of students" when he was 18 years old. From 1948 to 1949, Hajiyev studied at Moscow Conservatory at Nikolai Rakov, but in 1953, graduated from Azerbaijan Conservatoire with the class of compositions at Gara Garayev.

In 1955, he became the organizer of stage orchestra at the Azerbaijan SSR and was its artistic Director until 1964. He was the member of the Communist Party of the Soviet Union until 1958. In 1964, he became the director of Azerbaijan Philharmonic Orchestra, and after a year, in 1965, he was appointed the minister of culture of the Azerbaijan SSR and remained at this post until 1971.

At the initiative of the Soviet leadership, Rauf Hajiyev was sent to Algeria as the General Adviser of Art throughout the African continent. Living for 8 years in Africa, Rauf Hajiyev put on three ballets, which were demonstrated in Paris, and established three academies in Algeria-Academy of Dances, Academy of Music and Academy of the Theater during this period.

After returning to the USSR, he became the chairman of the Union of Composers of the Azerbaijan SSR, and remained at this post to the end of his life.

He was buried in the Alley of Honour in Baku.

== Creativity ==
Rauf Hajiyev, was the author of many musical works, including musical comedies "Romeo is my neighbor" (1960), "Don't hide your smile" (1969), "Mother, I'm going to marry" (1976), "Guba-my love!" (1963), two ballets, there symphonic poems-"Sheykh Sanan" (1982), "Sabuhi" (1983), "Azi Aslanov" (1984). In 1976, the composer created a cantata, dedicated to Samad Vurgun. This composition is considered to be one of the best Azerbaijani compositions in this genre.

During his creative life, Rauf Hajiyev composed music for spectacles, musical comedies and films. One of them is the film "Gipsy woman". Rauf Hajiyev is the author of 150 songs and the most popular including-"My Azerbaijan", "Spring is coming", "My Lover", "Baku", "Leyla".

== Awards and titles ==
- Honored Art Worker of the Azerbaijan SSR;
- People's Artiste of the Azerbaijan SSR;
- People's Artist of the USSR;
