= Rain Sultanov =

Azerbaijani jazz saxophonist (born 1965)

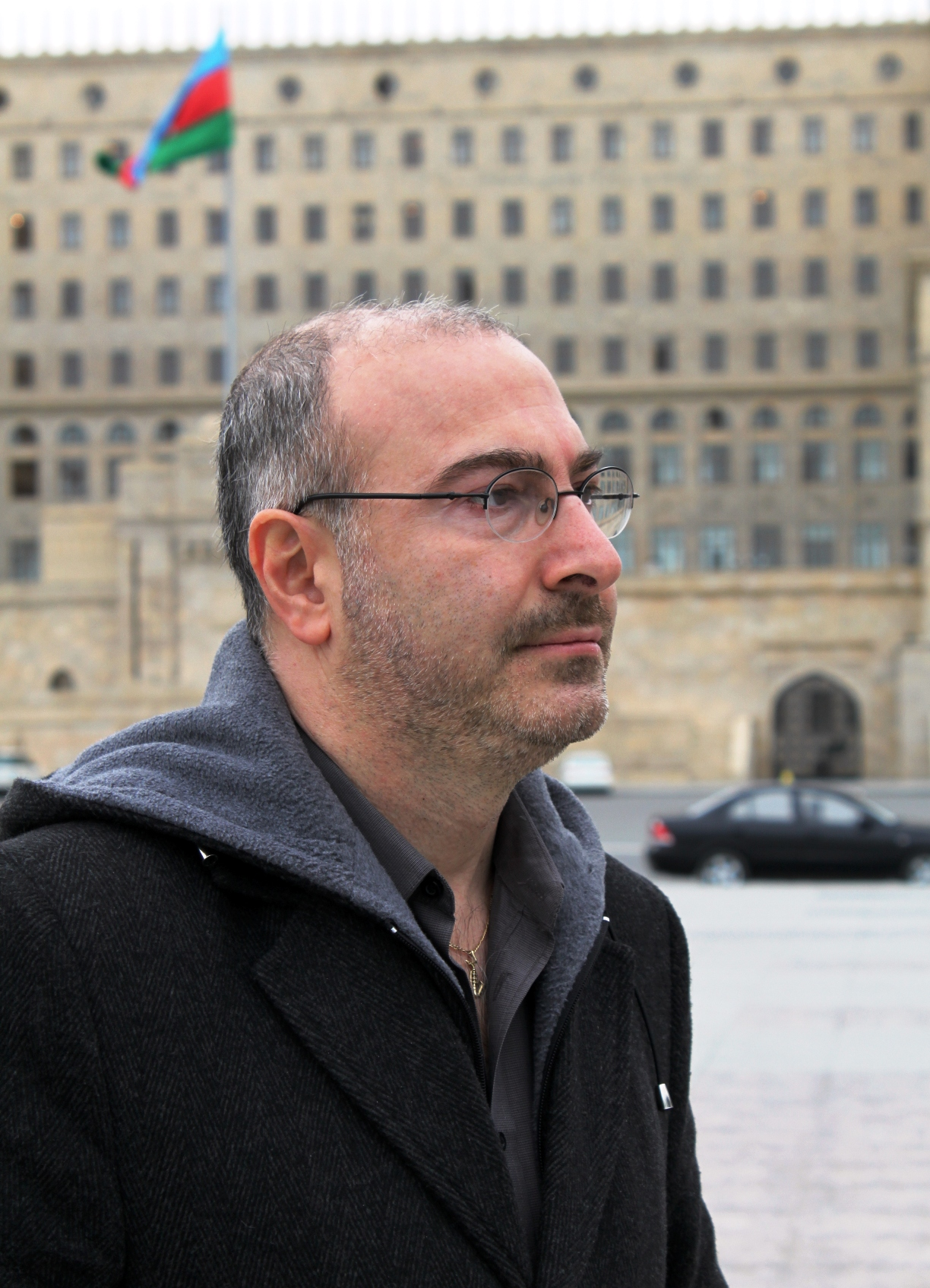

Background information
- Birth name: Rain Aladdin oglu Sultanov'
- Born: April 29, 1965 (age 59); Baku, Azerbaijan SSR, USSR
- Genres: Ethno-jazz, contemporary jazz, jazz fusion
- Occupation(s): Musician, composer
- Instrument: Saxophone
- Years active: 1995–present

Rain Aladdin oglu Sultanov (born April 29, 1965) is an Azerbaijani jazz saxophonist and Honorary Artist of Azerbaijan.

== Biography ==
Sultanov was born on April 29, 1965, in Baku. His brothers Rauf and Ramin are also musicians. At the age of 14, Sultanov entered a clarinet class of a musical school, following advice of his brothers. Rain's interest in jazz music and especially in the creativity of “Weather Report” band and Miles Davis is connected to this period. At the age of 16, Sultanov mastered the saxophone. He played at military band while being in the Soviet Army for four years. Continuing his musical education at Asaf Zeynally Music School in Baku, Sultanov took the first place at the Republican Contest among specialized schools, in 1985. He performed compositions of Tchaikovsky, Mozart, Weber and others. At that time Sultanov had already begun to perform jazz compositions too, and was invited to work in “Ashiqlar” band of Polad Bülbüloğlu, which also experimented with jazz music.

In 1988, Sultanov worked at State Song Theatre on Rashid Behbudov’s invitation and performed compositions of Charlie Parker and Michael Brecker. He entered Azerbaijan State Conservatoire in the same year. In 1989, Sultanov was invited to Azerbaijani State Orchestra “Gaya”. Musical manager of the orchestra was Tofig Shabanov, by invitation of whose Sultanov worked as a soloist and showed himself not only as a good improvisator but also as a talented music arranger. In 1992, Sultanov was invited to work as a soloist at Estrada-Symphonic Orchestra of Azerbaijan State Broadcasting Union under the management of Faig Sujeddinov. During that period, Sultanov performed at jazz programs and solo concerts. In 1992-94’s, Sultanov played at different jazz clubs and concert halls of Turkey and Moscow. In 1995, Sultanov composed his first compositions called “Jokers and dance” and “Day off”.

== Creativity ==
In 1996-97's, Sultanov became a member of jazz festivals in Germany. He composed such compositions as “Last moment”, “Crazy world” and others while being in Germany and returning to the motherland he decided to create a group called “Syndicate”. Rain's elder brother Rauf Sultanov (bass guitar), Eldar Rzaguluzade (piano), Hamdulla Gafari (guitar) and Vagif Aliyev (percussion instruments) were members of this group. The first solo concerts called “Last moment” of “Syndicate” group were held from July 14 to July 15, 1997. “Syndicate” achieved a great success with its original compositions among its listeners in a short space of time. In 1997–98, Sultanov performed “standards” compositions of John Coltrane and Miles Davis in most jazz clubs of Baku and Germany. In 1998, “Syndicate” group received an invitation to international jazz festival in Novosibirsk and performed at jam sessions with such famous jazzmen as Curtis Fuller (trombone), Adam Rogers (guitar), Donny McCaslin (saxophone) and others. In January, 1999 the group “Syndicate”, which has already become popular, released its first compact disk called “Last moment”. Not long after, decided to show his composer works and mastery of performance in other direction and released a solo album called “Mugham – Meqam”. The album was very successful in Sultanov's motherland as well as in foreign countries. Compositions from this album entered the top ten list on the radio in Baku and they became favorites of listeners of “Russkoe Radio” in Israel.

In 2008, Sultanov finished works on album called “Tale Of My Land”, upon which he worked for two years. Sultanov called this project an album-book, because it consists of forty pages with photos. The album consists of two discs and spans three hours of material. The first disc is musical, but the second disc contains a short film of 17 minutes, shot by Azerbaijani and Turkish film directors. There is an interview with Sultanov in the first part of the album, but the second part has music of the jazzman complementing photos located in the disc. These are photos of children, old men and especially refugees. The third part is mini-clip, the main leitmotif of which are war and tragedies that war entails.

== Video ==
External videos
- Rain Sultanov "Tale of My Land"
- Rain Sultanov "Footprints"
