= Rafig Babayev =

Azerbaijani jazz musician, composer, and conductor

Rafig Babayev Rafiq Babayev
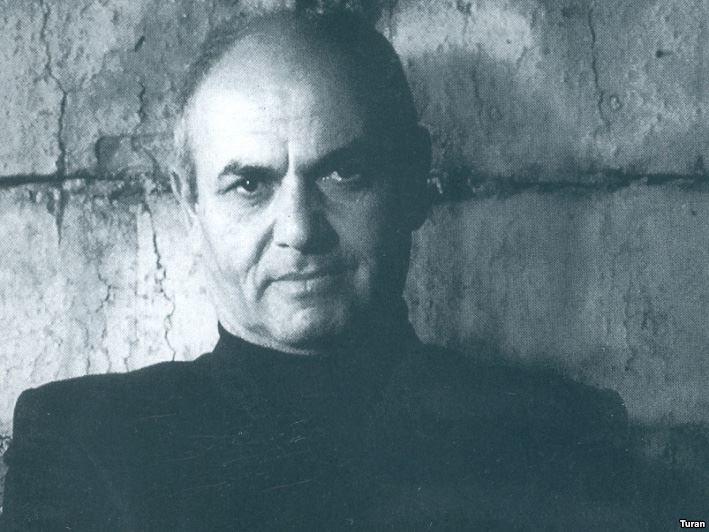

Background information
- Born: March 31, 1937
- Origin: Baku, Azerbaijan
- Died: March 19, 1994 (aged 56)
- Genres: Jazz
- Occupations: Musician, composer, conductor, arranger
- Spouse: Farida Mamed gizi Babayeva (m. 1965)

Rafig Farzi oglu Babayev (Azerbaijani: Rafiq Farzi oğlu Babayev, 31 March 1937 – 19 March 1994) was an Azerbaijani jazz musician, composer, conductor, arranger, author of scores for films, and People's Artist of Azerbaijan (1993).

== Biography ==
Rafig Babayev, one of the Azerbaijani coryphaeus, was born on March 31, 1936, in Baku, in a large musical family. Rafig's father, Farzi Babayev, was imprisoned by Soviet authorities and he was brought up by his mother, Shahbeyim, in poverty, together with his three sisters and brother. Four children of the family, including Rafig Babayev, later became professional musicians. Rafig Babayev got his first musical education at a special musical school (1943–1950) and later entered fortepiano class of Baku Musical School named after Asaf Zeynally (1950–1954). Being a student of the school, he worked as a musical instructor of an instrumental ensemble, was keen on jazz music and became proficient in improvisation art. Composition of American jazz pianist Bill Evans was also included in his graduation examination program besides classic music. So Rafig Babayev's career as a jazz musician began. Graduating from Azerbaijan State Conservatory named after Uzeyir Hajibeyov in 1959, Rafig Babayev entirely devoted himself to jazz music, became musical manager of jazz-instrumental group, with which he went on a long tour throughout the Soviet Union. In 1966, he made acquaintance with singer Rashid Behbudov, who established the Music Theatre. Rashid Behbudov invited Rafig Babayev to be a musical manager of the Music Theatre and they prepared a great dramatized concert program. In this period Rafig Babayev continued his creative activity in the sphere of jazz music, always participating at jazz festivals. In 1967, Rafig Babayev's ensemble became a laureate of the International Jazz Festival in Tallinn. Rafig Babayev's composition, which was performed in harmony of "Bayati - Kurd" mugham was especially mentioned.

In 1978, Rafig Babayev was conferred a title of Honored Artist of Azerbaijan for his great merits in development of musical culture of Azerbaijan. In 1984, he was invited to work as an artistic manager and chief conductor of Symphonic Estrada Orchestra of Azerbaijan State Broadcasting Company. In this period Rafig Babayev carried out great pedagogical work for rising young instrumentalist musicians and vocalists' performance level. Under this orchestra Rafig Babayev created an ensemble of soloists, which was very popular in Azerbaijan and in other foreign countries. Such professional musicians as Gennadiy Stepanishev (flute, saxophone), Rauf Sultanov (bass guitar), Alesger Abbasov (guitar), Siyavush Kerimi (oud, keyboard instruments), Jamil Amirov (keyboard instruments), Tofig Jabbarov (percussion instruments), Firuz Ismaylov (synthesizer), Ramin Sultanov (percussion instruments), Emil Hasanov (bass guitar), Vagif Aliyev (percussion instruments) played in this jazz ensemble at different times.

In 1991, Rafig Babayev organized folkloric jazz group "Jangi" and created recording studio, which helped the group in realization of musical projects. The group performed colorful compositions, using folk instruments, enriching them with uncommon harmony, melodically combining music of the Eastern and the Western civilizations.

Rafig Babayev was the member of the Union of Composers and the Union of Cinematographers, he gained fame as a unique musician, composer, high class pianist, public figure, organizer of various creative contests, viewings and festivals. Great amount of jazz compositions, pieces, songs, various arrangements for folk songs, scores for more than 20 films were created by him. In 1993, Rafig Babayev conferred the title of People's Artist of Azerbaijan for his merits for Azerbaijani culture. In 1993 Babayev's jazz band arrived to California to perform in Los Angeles and the Bay Area.

Rafig Babayev was killed in the 1994 Baku Metro bombings.

== Discography ==
1. Jazz Compositions On The Themes Of Rauf Gajiyev's Operettas - 1970

== Film scores ==
1. 1969 – “Etude about Azerbaijan”. Ogtay Mirgasimov's documentary, “Azerbaijanfilm”.
2. 1970 – “Bread”. Documentary of Z.Maharramov, “Azerbaijanfilm”.
3. 1970 – “10 minutes about Baku”. Documentary of Ogtay Mirgasimov, “Azerbaijanfilm”.
4. 1971 – “Nighttime conversation”. Documentary of Ogtay Mirgasimov, “Azerbaijanfilm”.
5. 1974– “1001st tour”. Documentary of Ogtay Mirgasimov, “Azerbaijanfilm”.
6. 1978 – “Together with spring”. Documentary of Z.Maharramov, “Azerbaijanfilm”.
7. 1978 – “Cottage of one family”. Y.Gusman's film, “Azerbaijanfilm”.
8. 1979 – “Phaeton driver”. Documentary of J.Farajov, “Azerbaijanfilm”.
9. 1980 – “I would like to understand”. Ogtay Mirgasimov's film, “Azerbaijanfilm”.
10. 1982 – “Silver van”. Ogtay Mirgasimov's film, “Azerbaijanfilm”.
11. 1982 – “Shelf”. Documentary of R.Shahmaliyev, “Azerbaijanfilm”.
12. 1982 – “The Earth – cosmos – feedback”. Documentary of R.Shahmaliyev, “Azerbaijanfilm”.
13. 1985 – “Jin in micro-district”. Ogtay Mirgasimov's film, “Azerbaijanfilm”.
14. 1985 – “One evening”. F.Gurbanov's cartoon, “Azerbaijanfilm”.
15. 1986 – “Under the high skies of Motherland”. Documentary of I.Safarov. “Azerbaijantelefilm”.
16. 1986 – “Kind fairytale”. V.Behbudov's cartoon, “Azerbaijantelefilm”.
17. 1986 – “Black stork”. V.Behbudov's cartoon, “Azerbaijantelefilm”.
18. 1987 – “Devil under the love glass”. Ogtay Mirgasimov's film, “Azerbaijanfilm”.
19. 1987 – “1000 years”. Documentary of I.Safarov, “Azerbaijantelefilm”.
20. 1987 – “Magic lantern”. V.Behbudov's cartoon, “Azerbaijantelefilm”.
21. 1988 – “Basat – the winner of Cyclop”. V.Behbudov's cartoon, “Azerbaijantelefilm”.
22. 1989 – “Memory”. Documentary of I.Safarov, “Azerbaijantelefilm”.
23. 1989 – “Gurbanali bey”. V.Behbudov's cartoon, “Azerbaijantelefilm”.
