= Vagif Mustafazadeh =

Azerbaijani pianist and composer (1940–1979)

Vagif Mustafazadeh Vaqif Mustafazadə
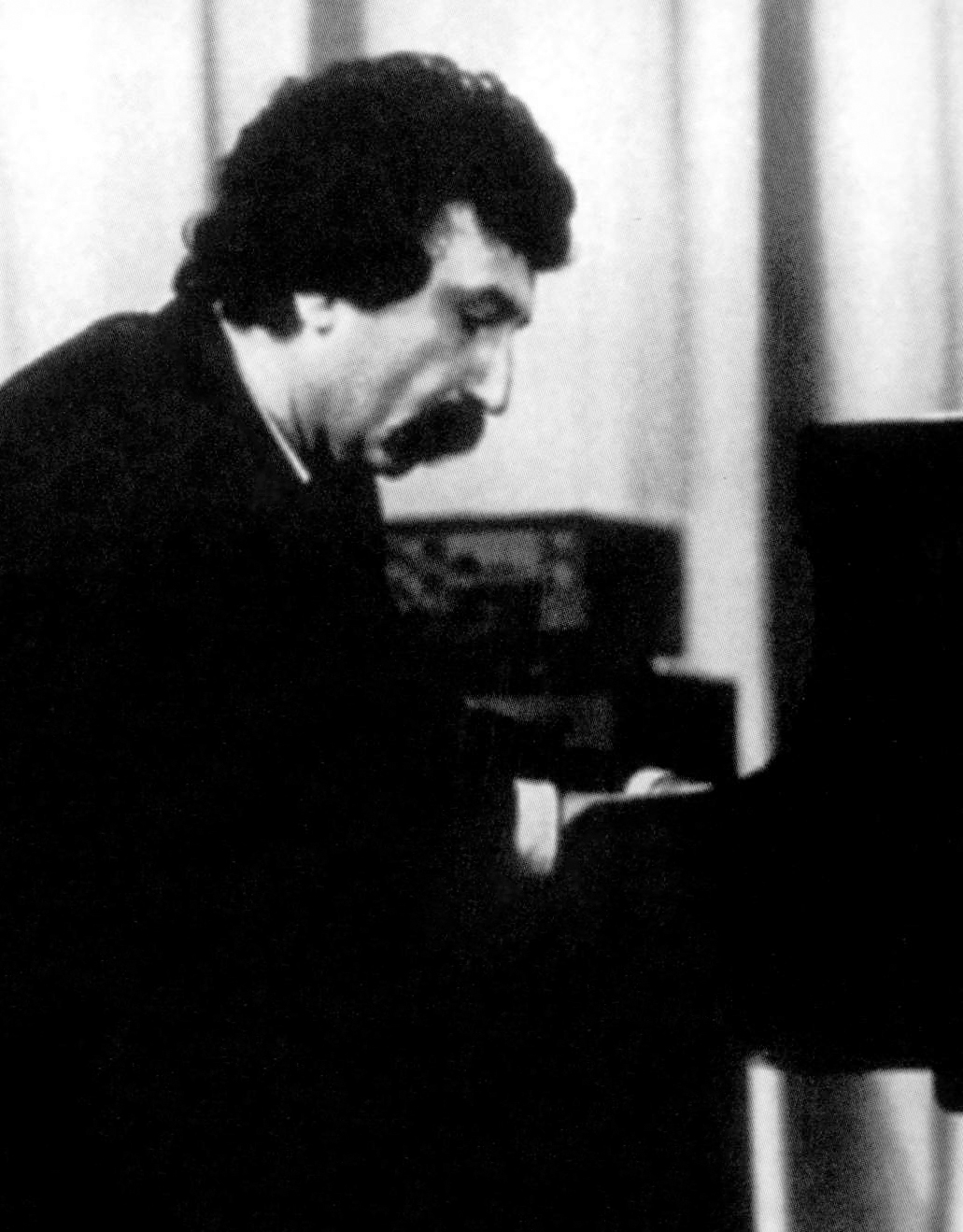

Background information
- Born: March 16, 1940; Baku, Azerbaijan SSR, Soviet Union
- Died: December 16, 1979 (aged 39) Tashkent, Uzbek SSR
- Genres: Jazz
- Occupations: Composer, musician
- Instrument: Piano
- Years active: 13 years
- Website: vagif.musigi-dunya.az

Vagif Mustafazadeh (Azerbaijani: Vaqif Mustafazadə; March 16, 1940 – December 16, 1979), also known as Vaqif Mustafa-Zadeh, was a Soviet-Azerbaijani jazz pianist and composer, acclaimed for fusing jazz and the traditional Azerbaijani folk music, known as mugham. According to many world famous jazz musicians, Mustafazadeh is one of the pioneers and "the architect of jazz in Azerbaijan".

== Early life ==
Mustafazadeh was born in Old City, the historic core of Baku, on March 16, 1940. His name was chosen by the renowned poet, Samed Vurgun, on the request of his mother, who was a piano teacher in a local music school and played a very influential and immeasurable role in his success.

In 1963, he graduated from Baku State Musical School named after Asaf Zeynally and a year later accepted to Azerbaijan State Conservatoire. He first achieved fame at the Music School where he studied by giving concerts there, later on performing at the parties and evenings held at the universities and clubs, shortly after he became one of the most influential musical performers in Azerbaijan. While performing at the clubs, he mainly played classical jazz, as well as blues and dance music.

Musical prohibitions during the 1940s and 1950s during Stalinist era meant that the playing of jazz was banned in the USSR, including Azerbaijan. Since there was no opportunity to get jazz records from anywhere, Mustafazade listened to jazz pieces, learning from movies where he heard jazz music and BBC radio and sang Meykhana, rhythmic poetry, which had also been banned. After listening on the radio, he and his friend Vagif Samadoglu attempted to recreate the music on the piano.

== Popularity and recognition ==
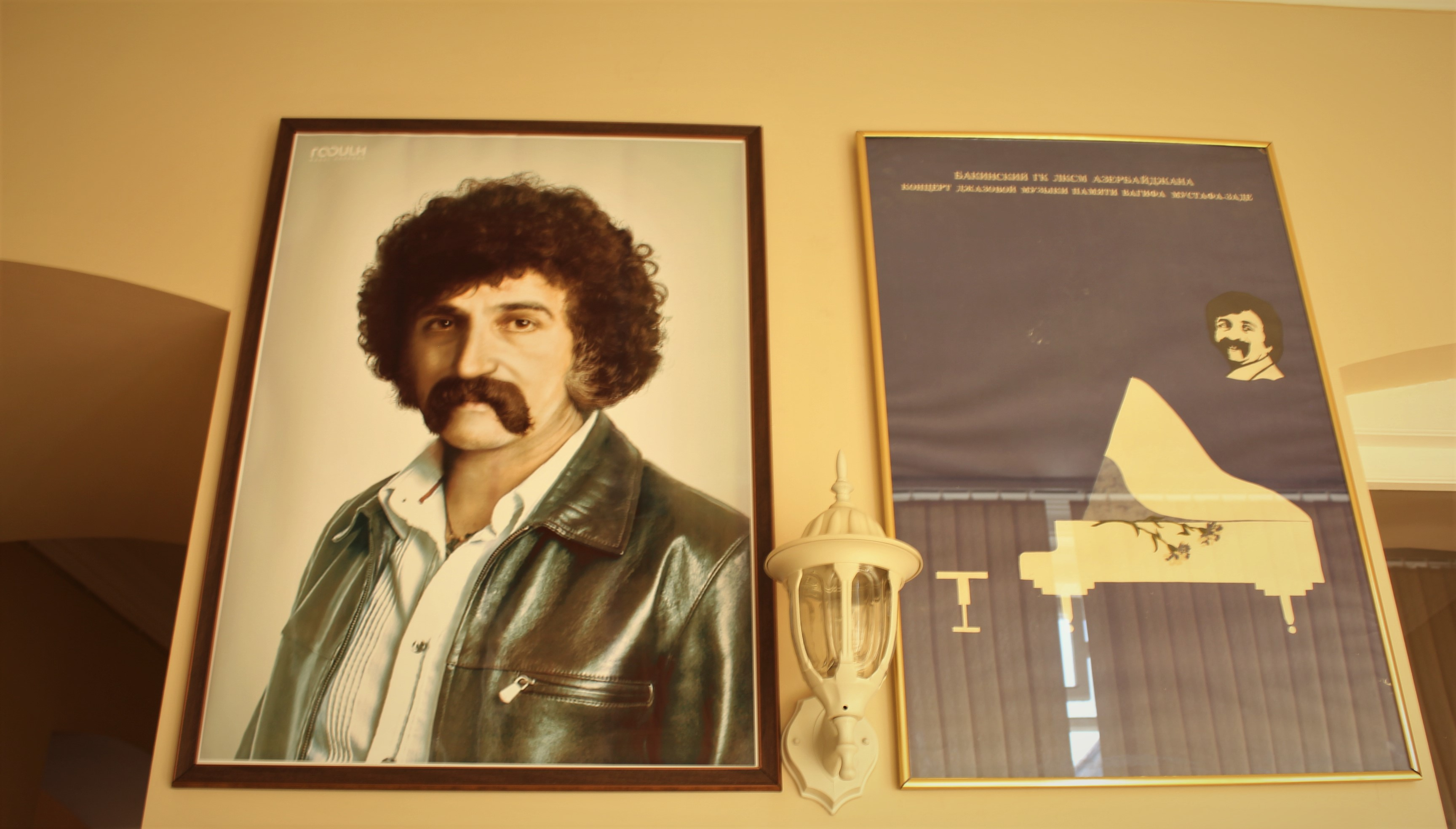
Exhibit at Vagif Mustafazade's house museum

From the 1960s, prohibitions put on jazz music were gradually lifted and thus the late 1960s and 70s became a time when Baku was a real center of locally inspired jazz. By this time, Mustafazade was making his way to his audience and his popularity grew. His name was often mentioned among other jazz musicians and he participated in festivals held in his native land, as well as in and outside the Soviet countries. Since making a strong impression in his early years at college, his music progressed and popularity grew; he appeared in many festivals.

In 1966, Willis Conover, conductor of the "Jazz Time" radio program, even went as far as to say, "Vagif Mustafazadeh is an extraordinary pianist. It is impossible to identify his equal. He is the most lyrical pianist I have ever known.

In 1965, he quit the conservatoire and went to Tbilisi to lead the "Orero" musical ensemble. Later he created the "Qafqaz" jazz trio at Georgian State Philarmony. In 1970 the "Leyli" women's quartet and in 1971 "Sevil" vocal-instrumental ensemble were assembled by him. Until 1977 he guided the groups. Between 1977 and 1979 until his death he led the "Mugham" instrumental ensemble which was also organized by him.Vagif attended "Tallinn-66" All-Soviet Union Jazz Festival and "Caz-69" Azerbaijani jazz festivals and was awarded as laureate there. Mustafazadeh was also elected as laureate at Donetsk All-Soviet Union Jazz Festival held in 1977. He was elected as the best pianist in "Tbilisi-78". He won first prize at the 8th International Competition of Jazz Composers for his composition "Waiting for Aziza" in Monaco in 1978, and was awarded a white grand piano, but died the next year. Vagif Mustafazadeh was named Honored Artist of Azerbaijan SSR and after his death was honoured with an Azerbaijani State Prize.

== Jazz mugham ==
Mustafazadeh is the founder of Azerbaijani jazz mugham movement that emerged in the late 1960s and 1970s in Baku, as a result of the mixture of these two styles. He began searching for new ways to structure his improvisations by exploring modal music. More innovative approaches were taken by him and its influence stretched into later developments of this style.

== Death ==
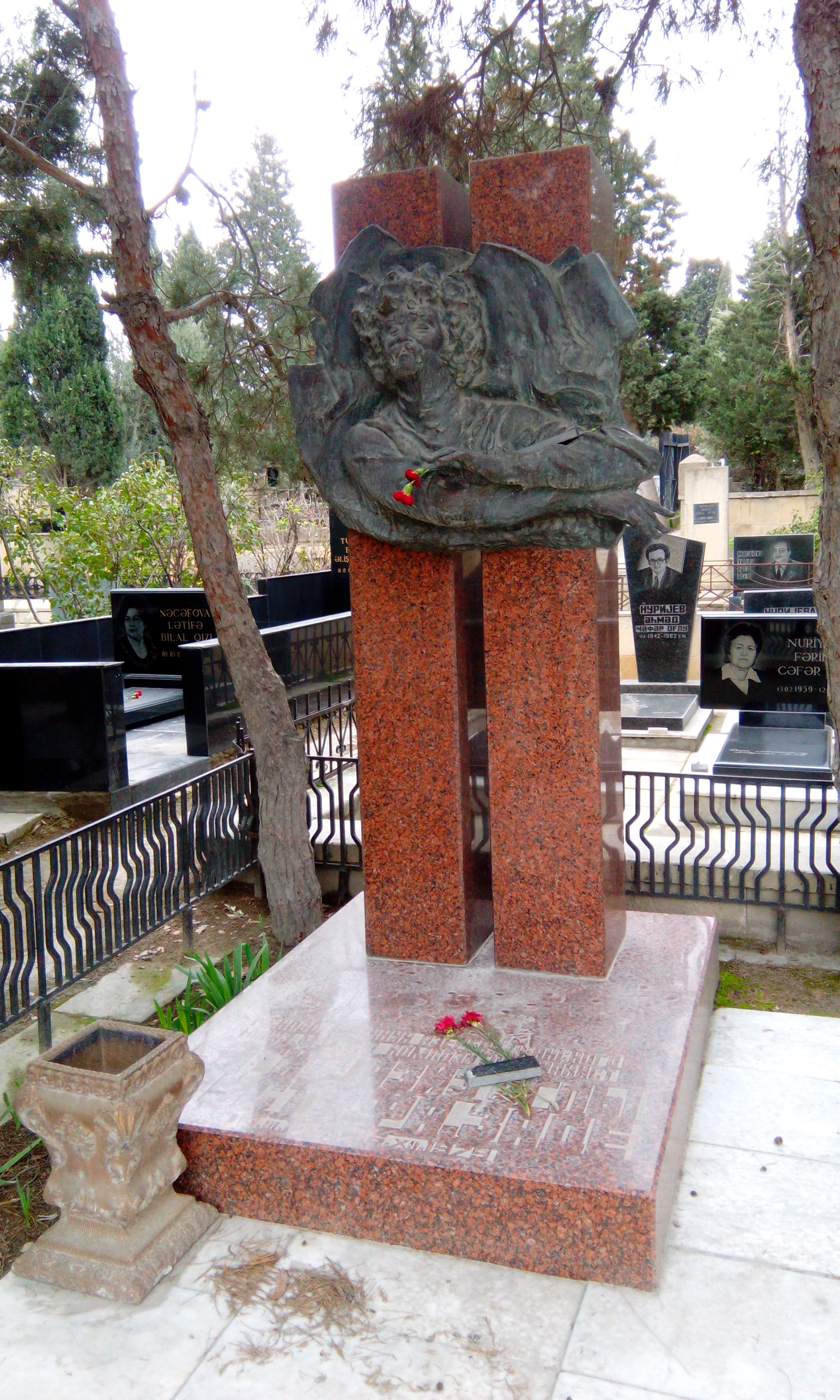
Grave of Vagif Mustafazadeh in Baku

Mustafazadeh died of a heart attack shortly after a concert in Tashkent and also shortly before the birthdays of his wife (December 17) and daughter (December 19).

== Personal life ==
Mustafazadeh was married twice; from his first marriage he had a daughter named Lala, a talented classical pianist. She won the Grand Prize in the Epinal Piano Competition, France, in 1991. His second marriage was to Eliza, and from that union was born Aziza Mustafa Zadeh, also a jazz musician.

== Legacy ==
His works and performance were praised by internationally known leading world musicians, such as Willis Conover and B.B. King. Once when King shared the same stage with Mustafazade, he heard him playing the blues piano and said nobody could play the blues like him and afterwards said to Vagif that "people call me the king of the blues, but if I could play the piano like you do, I would call myself God."

More than three decades since Mustafazade's death, a larger number of his recordings from all periods of his career are more widely available in stores than at any time during his lifetime.

== House museum ==
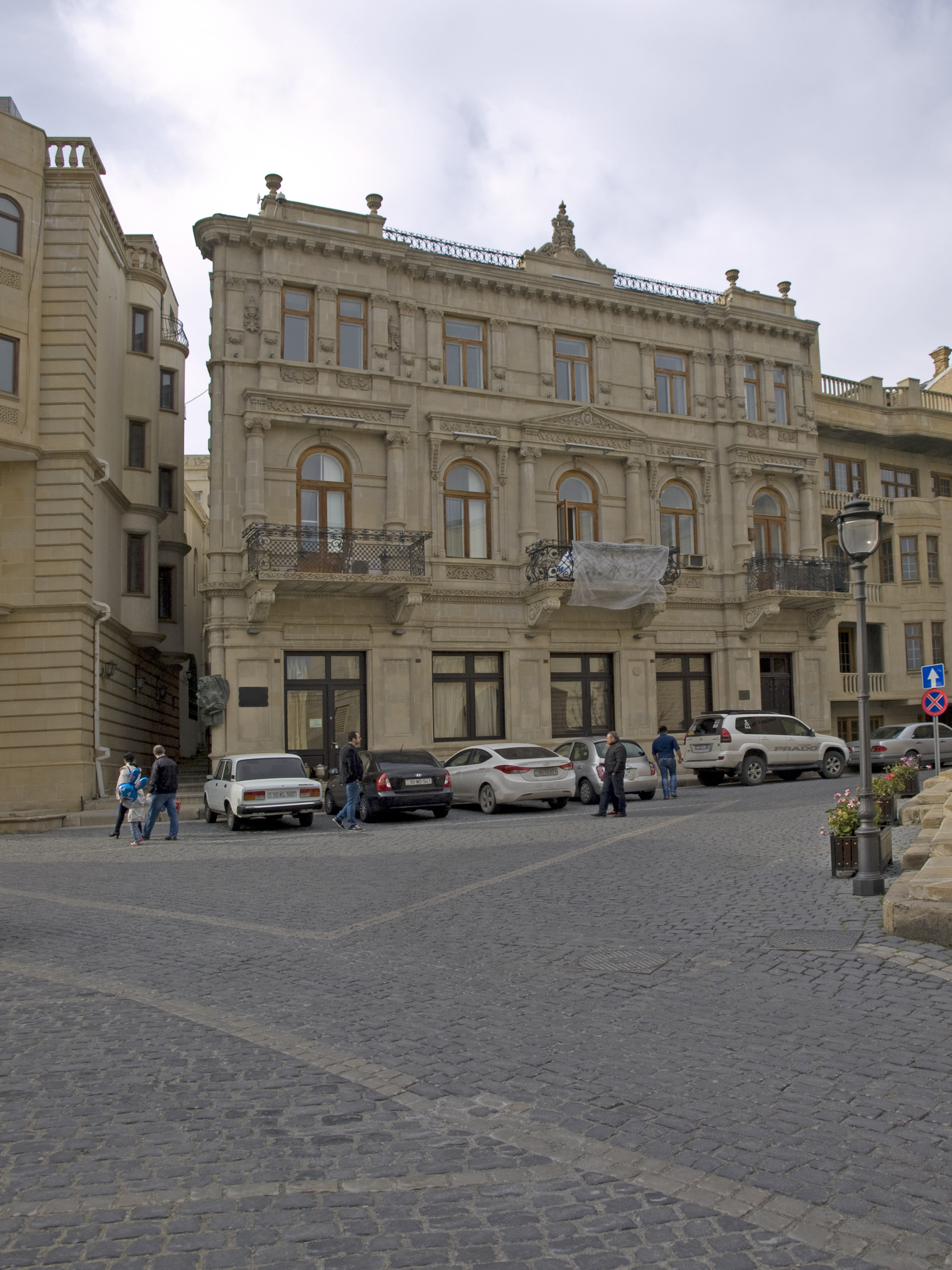
The building housing Vagif Mustafazadeh House museum

With the initiative of Former Minister of Culture, Polad Bulbuloglu, Vagif Mustafazadeh's House museum was established. First, the museum was run by Jazzman's mother, Zivar khanum. Afterwards, she behested the museum to her niece, Afag. Afag Aliyeva has been head of the museum since 1997. In 2004, the expositions as well as the building of the museum was restored with her initiative. Beginning from 2004, the museum operates as a state museum under the control of Ministry of Culture of the Republic of Azerbaijan.
