= Azerbaijani pop music =

Azerbaijani-language pop music produced either in Azerbaijan or other countries

- Stylistic origins: Traditional pop, Mugham, classical music, Europop
- Cultural origins: 1950s, USSR

Azerbaijani pop music (Azerbaijani: Azərbaycan pop musiqisi) is a pop music created in Azerbaijan. The emergence of Azerbaijani pop music dates back to the mid-20th century. Growth of new generation of musicians in the 1970s positively influenced Azerbaijan pop music's "golden age". Performers of traditional pop music such as Mirza Babayev, Flora Karimova and Shovkat Alakbarova achieved great success at that time. Contemporary Azerbaijani pop music has its roots in traditional Azerbaijani folk music.

As a result of globalisation, Azerbaijani pop music has been heavily influenced by both dance and electronic forms of pop music of the 1980s, as well as by genres of the 2000s such as electropop, dance-pop and synth-pop. In 2011, the song Running Scared (Ell & Nikki song), performed by the duo Ell & Nikki, was Azerbaijan's first-ever victory on European song contest Eurovision.

== History ==
=== 1960s ===
The early 1960s were probably the era when Azerbaijani pop music was most dependent on the group format, with pop acts, like rock bands, playing guitars and drums, with the occasional addition of keyboards or orchestration. Classical pop-folk music enjoyed mainstream popularity during this era, with artists such as Anatollu Ganiyev, Muslim Magomayev and Shahlar Guliyev.

=== 1970s ===
The Azerbaijani pop music experienced during the late 1970s a golden age of productivity characterized by the rise of a new generation of musicians. The classical pop artists such as Rashid Behbudov, Mirza Babayev, Flora Karimova, Shovkat Alakbarova, Ogtay Aghayev, and Gulagha Mammadov experienced their greatest success at the start of the decade and maintained their popularity throughout the entire music history.

=== 1980s ===
Akif Islamzade often considered one of the most successful and influential Azerbaijani male pop artists of the early 1980s.

Baku chanson, a subgenre of Russian chanson, picked up popularity for the mid 1980s. Artists such as Eyyub Yaqubov brought Baku chanson to popularity in 1992. However, many artists were uncomfortable with their success, and were equally suspicious of the chanson label.

=== 1990s ===
In the early 1990s, the country music charts were dominated by pop singers with only tangential influences from regional music such as Niyameddin Musayev and Baloghlan Ashrafov, a trend that has continued since.

In the 1990s, while the singles charts were dominated by boy bands and girl groups like Karvan and W Trio, artists like Aygun Kazimova, Faig Aghayev, Samir Bagirov, Zulfiyya Khanbabayeva and Brilliant Dadasheva also enjoyed their greatest level of mainstream success to date, and the rise of World music helped revitalise the popularity of folk music.

During first Nagorno-Karabakh War, in stark contrast to the upbeat dance based music of the scene was the emergence military bard that emerged as part of the independent or alternative folk scenes of the 1990s, following the lead of artists such as Shamistan Alizamanli and Mubariz Taghiyev.

=== 2000s ===
The Azerbaijani pop singer Röya breakthrough at the early 2000s led to her major international success in many Turkic speaking countries, especially the Iranian Azerbaijan and Turkey in addition to the music scene of Azerbaijan.

At the beginning of the new millennium, while talent show contestants were one of the major forces in pop music, as country made its debut appearance at the 2008 Eurovision Song Contest. The country's entry gained the third place in 2009 and fifth the following year. Ell and Nikki won the first place at the Eurovision Song Contest 2011 with the song "Running Scared", entitling Azerbaijan to host the contest in 2012, in Baku.

On contrary, many music critics argued that the surge of Yeni Ulduz (Pop Idol) type competitions and reality shows on Azerbaijani TV has only added to the pop industry's shallow image, and is cited as the reason why underground and reactionary music is becoming more popular.

=== 2010s ===
Influenced by globalization of the world music, electropop, dance-pop, synthpop and electrohop, along with other forms of dance, electronica and pop music that started in the 1980s, have become the dominant form of music in the Azerbaijan in the early 2010s.

Despite the commercial dominance of hip-hop and pop during this period, rapper Miri Yusif found success with his reggae and soul fusion album "Karma", peaked at number 1 in the Azerbaijani Albums Chart in 2010.Also in 2018 the most viewed azerbaijani song belongs to Miri Yusif " Ad günü " (ft. Dilara Kazimova ) . Azerbaijan pop music industry keep growing up with Youtube mashups.

== Notable performers ==
=== Individuals ===
==== Female ====
Sabina Babayeva · Safura Alizadeh · Flora Karimova

- Aygun Kazimova
- Tunzala Aghayeva
- Shovkat Alakbarova
- Sevda Alakbarzadeh
- Nushaba Alasgarly
- Safura Alizadeh
- Sheyla
- Sabina Babayeva
- Elnara
- Nazpari Dostaliyeva
- Khumar Gadimova
- Ilhama Gasimova
- Irada Ibrahimova
- Nigar Jamal
- Manana Japaridze
- Flora Karimova
- Konul Karimova
- Dilara Kazimova
- Zulfiyya Khanbabayeva
- Zeynab Khanlarova
- Aysel Teymurzadeh
- Röya
- Nahide Babashli

==== Male ====
Muslim Magomayev · Eldar Gasimov

- Emin Agalarov
- Aghadadash Aghayev
- Faig Aghayev
- Samir Bagirov
- Ogtay Aghayev
- Shamistan Alizamanli
- Mirza Babayev
- Abbas Baghirov
- Rashid Behbudov
- Bulbul
- Polad Bülbüloğlu
- Nadir Gafarzade
- Eldar Gasimov
- Talıb Tale
- Huseynagha Hadiyev
- Akif Islamzade
- Muslim Magomayev
- Farid Mammadov
- Adalet Shukurov
- Mubariz Taghiyev
- Eyyub Yaqubov
- Miri Yusif
- Elariz Mammadoğlu

==== Groups ====
- Ell & Nikki

== See also ==
- Azerbaijani folk music
- Azerbaijani jazz
- Azerbaijani rock
