= Sheilagh =

Sheilagh (alternatively spelled Sheila, Shelagh and Sheelagh) is a feminine given name, derived from the Irish name Síle, which is believed to be a Gaelic form of the Latin name Caelia, the feminine form of the Roman clan name Caelius, meaning 'heavenly'.

== People with the given name ==
- Sheilagh Brown, British fashion designer
- Sheilagh Kesting (born 1953), Scottish minister
- Sheilagh O'Leary, Canadian politician
- Sheilagh Ogilvie (born 1958), Canadian historian, economist and academic
- Sheilagh Polk

== See also ==
- Shelagh
- Shelah (disambiguation)
- Shela (disambiguation)
- Sheila
