= Sheila =

- Pronunciation: /ˈʃiːlə/
- Gender: Female
- Language: English, Irish

Origin
- Language: Irish
- Origin: Síle
- Derivation: Latin: Caelia
- Meaning: 'heavenly'
- Region of origin: Ireland

Other names
- Related names: Cecilia

Sheila (alternatively spelled Shelagh, Sheilagh and Sheelagh) is a common feminine given name, derived from the Irish name Síle, which is believed to be a Gaelic form of the Latin name Caelia, the feminine form of the Roman clan name Caelius, meaning 'heavenly'.

== People ==
- Sheila (French singer) (born 1945), real name Annie Chancel, French singer of group "Sheila (and) B. Devotion"
- Sheila Dara Aisha (born 1992), Indonesian actress and singer
- Sheila Matthews Allen (1929–2013), American actress
- Sheila F. Anthony, American attorney
- Sheila Atim (born c. 1991), Ugandan-British actress and singer
- Sheila Bair (born 1954), American academic and government official
- Sheila Bamber (1957-1985), English model
- Sheila Bartels, Ghanaian entrepreneur and politician
- Sheila Black, American poet
- Sheila Bleck (born 1974), American bodybuilder
- Sheila Levrant de Bretteville (born 1940), American graphic designer, artist and educator
- Sheila Bridges (born 1963/1964), American interior designer
- Sheila Bromley (1907–2003), American actress
- Sheila P. Burke (born 1950/51), American nurse and policy advisor
- Sheila Burnett (born 1949), British sprint canoeist
- Sheila Cameron (1934–2025), British lawyer
- Sheila Carrasco, American actress
- Sheila Cassidy (born 1937), English doctor
- Sheila Chandra (born 1965), English pop singer
- Sheila Cherfilus-McCormick (born 1979), American politician
- Sheila Chisholm (1895–1969), Australian socialite
- Sheila Collenette (1927–2017), British botanist
- Sheila Copps (born 1952), Canadian politician, Deputy Prime Minister of Canada
- Sheila Coronel, Filipina journalist and professor
- Sheila Darcy (1914–2004), American actress
- Sheila Dara Aisha (born 1992), Indonesian actress and singer
- Sheila Dhar (1929–2001), Indian author and singer
- Sheila Dikshit (1938–2019), Indian politician
- Sheila Dixon (born 1953), American mayor
- Sheila E. (born 1957), American singer
- Sheila Ellison, American author on parenting and relationships
- Sheila Elorza (born 1996), Spanish footballer
- Sheila Faith (1928–2014), British politician
- Sheila Fearn (born 1940), English actress
- Sheila Ferguson (born 1947), American singer
- Sheila Fitzpatrick (born 1941), Australian historian
- Sheila Florance (1916–1991), Australian actress
- Sheila Ford Hamp (born 1951), American businesswoman and sports team owner
- Sheila Forshaw (born 1958), Canadian field hockey player
- Sheila García (born 1997), Spanish footballer
- Sheila Giolitti, American painter
- Sheila Gish (1942–2005), English actress
- Sheila Gordon (1927–2013), South African-born American novelist
- Sheila Graber (born 1940), British animator, artist and Visiting Professor at the University of Sunderland
- Sheila Greaves (1911–2005), British nurse, recipient of the George Medal during the Second World War
- Sheila Greibach (born 1939), American theoretical computer scientist
- Sheila Gujral (1924–2011), Indian poet and writer
- Sheila Hancock (born 1933), English actress and author
- Sheila Hayman (born 1956), British documentary filmmaker, journalist and novelist
- Sheila Heti (born 1976), Canadian writer
- Sheila A. Hellstrom (1935–2020), Canadian general
- Sheila Henig (1934–1979), Canadian pianist and soprano
- Sheila Hicks (born 1934), American artist
- Sheila Horne, American singer and songwriter
- Sheila Hoskin (born 1936), English track and field athlete
- Sheila Ingram (1957–2020), American sprinter
- Sheila Jasanoff (born 1944), American social scientist
- Sheila Jeffreys (born 1948), English-Australian activist and author
- Sheila Johnson (born 1949), American businesswoman
- Sheila Jordan (1928–2025), American jazz singer and songwriter
- Sheila Kaul (1915–2015), Indian politician
- Sheila Kaye-Smith (1887–1956), English writer
- Sheila Keith (1920–2004), British actress
- Sheila Kennedy (born 1962), American actress
- Sheila Kohler (born 1941), South African author
- Sheila Kuehl (born 1941), American actor and politician
- Sheila LaBarre (born 1958), American murderer and possible serial killer
- Sheila Lambert (born 1980), American basketball player
- Sheila Lapinsky (born 1944), South African anti-apartheid and LGBTQ+ activist
- Sheila Leather (1898–1983) British engineer, business owner, president of the Women's Engineering Society
- Sheila Leatherman (born 1951), Professor in Global Health
- Sheila Jackson Lee (1950–2024), American lawyer and politician
- Sheila Lieder (fl. 2022), American politician
- Sheila Lochhead (1910–1994), British hostess, prison visitor and writer
- Sheila Lukins (1942–2009), American cook and food writer
- Sheila Lyman, American politician
- Sheila Mackie (1928–2010), English painter
- Sheila MacRae (1921–2014), American actress, singer, and dancer
- Sheila Majid (born 1965), Malaysian singer
- Sheila Makhijani (born 1962), Indian artist
- Sheila Marcia (born 1989), Indonesian DJ, actress, model and singer
- Sheila Martin (born 1943), Canadian politician
- Sheelagh Matear, New Zealand professor of marketing
- Sheila McCarthy (born 1956) Canadian actress and singer
- Sheila Mello (born 1978), Brazilian dancer, actress and model
- Sheila Mercier (1919–2019), British actress
- Sheila Michaels (1939 –2017), American feminist
- Sheila Ming-Burgess, Bermudian international fashion model and actress
- Sheila Miyoshi Jager (born 1963), American anthropologist
- Sheila McGuffie (1911–2007), British aeronautical engineer
- Sheila Brown Napaljarri (c. 1940–2003), Australian artist
- Sheila Natusch (1926–2017), New Zealand writer and naturalist
- Sheila Nazarian, Iranian-American plastic surgeon and television personality
- Sheila Nelson (1936–2020), English string teacher
- Sheila Nicholls (born 1970), English singer and songwriter
- Sheila Nix, American political strategist
- Sheila Noakes (born 1949), British politician
- Sheila O'Flanagan (born 1958), Irish writer and journalist
- Sheila Oliver (1952–2023), American politician
- Sheila Quinn (1920–2016), British nurse
- Sheila Piercey Summers (1919-2005), South African tennis player
- Sheila Radley (1928–2017), English writer
- Sheila Ramani (1932–2015), Indian actress
- Sheila Reith, British inventor and physician, co-inventor of the insulin pen
- Sheila M. Riggs, American dentistry scholar
- Sheila Rowan, British physicist
- Sheila Ryan (1921–1975), American actress
- Sheila Scott (1922–1988), British aviator
- Sheila Scotter (1920–2012), Australian fashion businesswoman
- Sheila Sherlock (1918–2001), British physician and educator
- Sheila Shulman (1936–2014), British rabbi
- Sheila Silver (born 1946), American composer
- Sheila Sim (1922–2016), English film and theatre actress
- Sheila Sri Prakash (born 1955), Indian architect and urban designer
- Sheila Steafel (1935–2019), South African-born British actress
- Sheila Taormina (born 1969), American athlete
- Sheila Tate, American government official
- Sheila Terry (1910–1957), American actress
- Sheila Tlou, Motswana nurse
- Sheila Tousey (born 1959), American actress
- Sheila Tracy (1934–2014), British trombonist and broadcaster
- Sheila Vand, American actress and performance artist
- Sheila Varian (1937–2016), American horse breeder
- Sheila Vogel-Coupe (1929–2022), English escort; the oldest prostitute in the United Kingdom
- Sheila Walsh (1928–2009), English novelist
- Sheila Ward (1936–2019), British police officer
- Sheila White (1950–2018), English actress
- Sheila White (born 1988), American abolitionist and human trafficking victim
- Sheila Elizabeth Whitton (1922–2017), Canadian coder
- Sheila Williams (born 1956), American editor
- Sheila Widnall (born 1938), American aerospace researcher and educator

== Fiction ==
- Sheila Bennet, Bonnie Bennett's grandmother, in The Vampire Diaries
- Shelagh Turner, in Call the Midwife
- Sheila Bryant, in the musical A Chorus Line
- A character in Army of Darkness
- Sheila Broflovski, from the animated series South Park
- Sheila Carter, from The Young and the Restless and The Bold and the Beautiful
- Sheila Canning, character from the soap opera, Neighbours
- Sheila Corkhill, from the British soap opera Brookside
- Sheila Franklin, a character and a song in the musical Hair
- Sheila Futterman, in Gremlins
- Sheila Gallagher, from the British television series Shameless
- Sheila Grant, in the British soap opera Brookside
- Sheila Tubman, in Judy Blume's book series Fudge
- Sheila R. Webb, in Agatha Christie's novel The Clocks
- Sheela na gig, a female character in ancient figurative carvings, used as architectural grotesques on churches, castles and other buildings, particularly in Ireland and Great Britain
- Sheila, one of the main characters in the animated television series Dungeons and Dragons
- Sheila, from Mis Adorables Vecinos (2004–2006), played by Yaiza Esteve
- Sheila, one of the main characters in the anime series Tweeny Witches
- Sheila, from SheZow
- Sheila, a playable kangaroo in the PlayStation game Spyro: Year of the Dragon
- Sheila, from item song "Sheila Ki Jawani", portrayed by Katrina Kaif from film Tees Maar Khan
- Sheila Birling, from J. B. Priestley's play An Inspector Calls
- Sheila, a yacht in the film The Last of Sheila named after one of the characters, Sheila Greene
- Sheila Take a Bow, 1987 single by The Smiths.
- Sheila, from manga Hunter x Hunter

== See also ==
- Shelia
- Scheila
- Shyla
