= Azerbaijani folk music =

Azerbaijani folk music (Azerbaijani: Azərbaycan Xalq Musiqisi) is shared by Azerbaijanis and Iranian Azerbaijanis.

Apart from the common music found all-around Azerbaijan and Azerbaijan (Iran), there are distinct types of folk music, sometimes related to the history or simply the taste of the specific places.

== History ==
Most songs recount stories of real-life events and Azerbaijani folklore, or have developed through song contests between troubadour poets. Corresponding to their origins, folk songs are usually played at weddings, funerals, and special festivals.

Regional folk music generally accompanies folk dances, which vary significantly across regions. The regional mood also affects the subject of the folk songs, e.g. folk songs from the Caspian Sea are lively in general and express the customs of the region. Songs about betrayal have an air of defiance about them instead of sadness, whereas the further south traveled in Azerbaijan the more the melodies resemble a lament.

== Traditional instruments ==
=== Stringed instruments ===
Plucked stringed instruments include the lute-like saz, chang, gopuz, tar and oud, originally barbat, and the dulcimer-like qanún (also sometimes hammered). Bowed stringed instruments include the kamancha.

=== Wind instruments ===
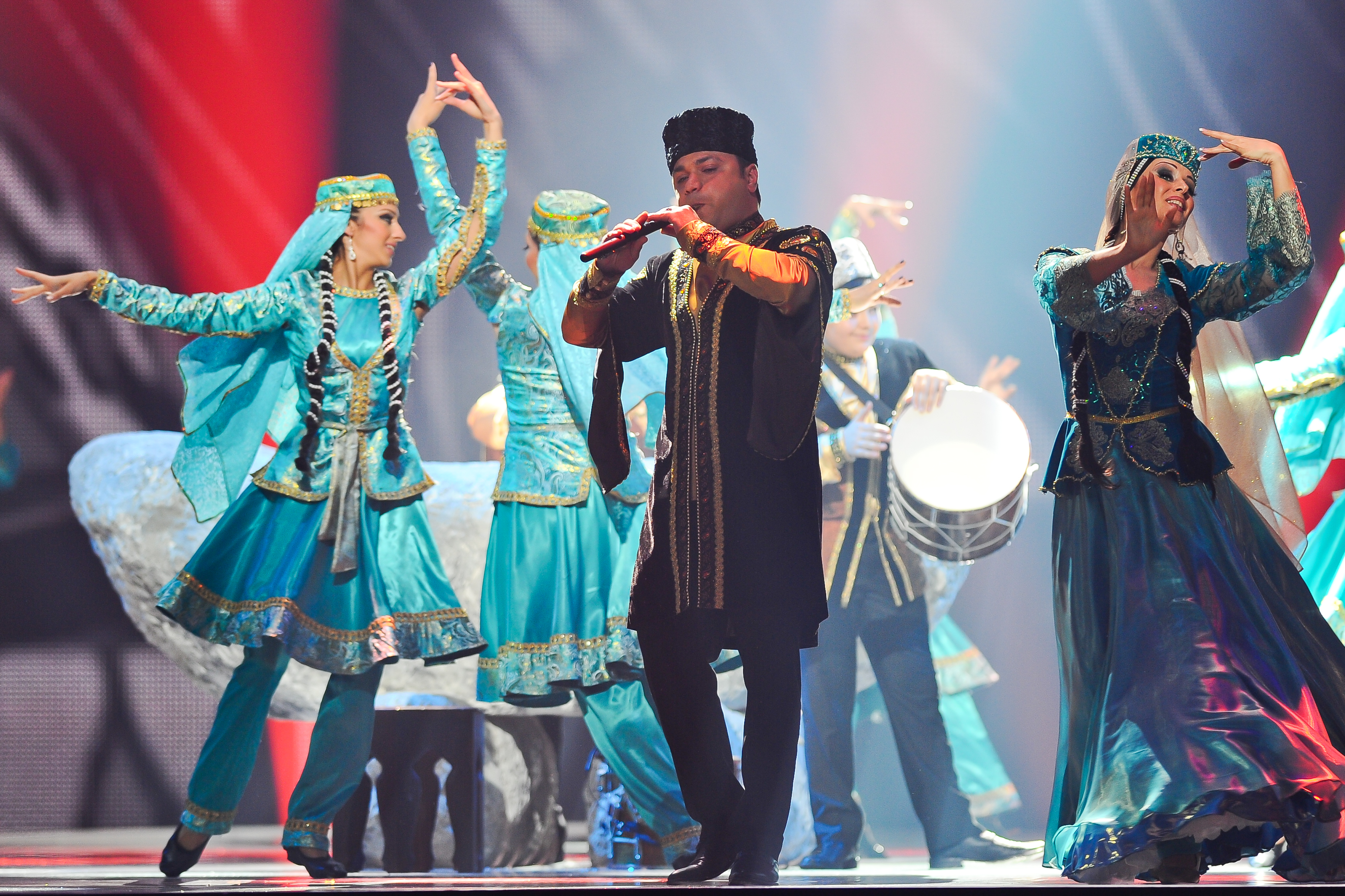
Azerbaijani folk musician playing balaban during Eurovision Song Contest 2012.

Woodwind instruments include the double-reed, shawm-like tutek (whistle flute), zurna, ney and balaban.

=== Percussion instruments ===
Percussion instruments include the frame drum ghaval, the cylindrical double faced drum nagara (davul), and the gosha nagara (pair of small kettle drums) and daf (frame drum).

Apart from percussion instruments, there is also this musical gemstone known as Gaval Dash. It makes a tambourine-like sound when it is hit at different points. Among the stone books there are a big flat stone formed out of 3 supports. Suffice it to touch the object with a small stone, musical sounds come from it. The Gaval Dash has been formed due to the combination of unique climate, oil, and gas which can be found in the region of Azerbaijan. The Gaval Dash can only be found in Gobustan, Azerbaijan.

== Forms of folk music ==
The first, and possibly the most important collection to focus in this area was, Asaf Zeynally's children's suite and Ganbar Huseynli's Jujalarim. Children's songs, unlike folk songs, have remained part of a living and continuous tradition, for although added to from other sources and affected by written versions, most adults pass on songs they learned from oral sources as children.

=== Work songs ===
Work songs include music sung while conducting a task (often to coordinate timing) or a song linked to a task or trade which might be a connected narrative, description, or protest song. The two main types of work song in Azerbaijani are agricultural work songs, usually are rhythmic a cappella songs sung by people working on a physical and often repetitive task, like the 'Tea song' common in Soviet Azerbaijan.

== Notable performers ==
=== Individuals ===
==== Female ====
- Shovkat Alakbarova
- Sevda Alakbarzadeh
- Azerin
- Nazakat Mammadova
- Zeynab Khanlarova
- Aygün Kazımova
- Googoosh

==== Male ====
- Ahmet Kaya
- Ogtay Aghayev
- Rashid Behbudov
- Bulbul
- Akif Islamzade
- Islam Rzayev
- Gulagha Mammadov

=== Musicians ===
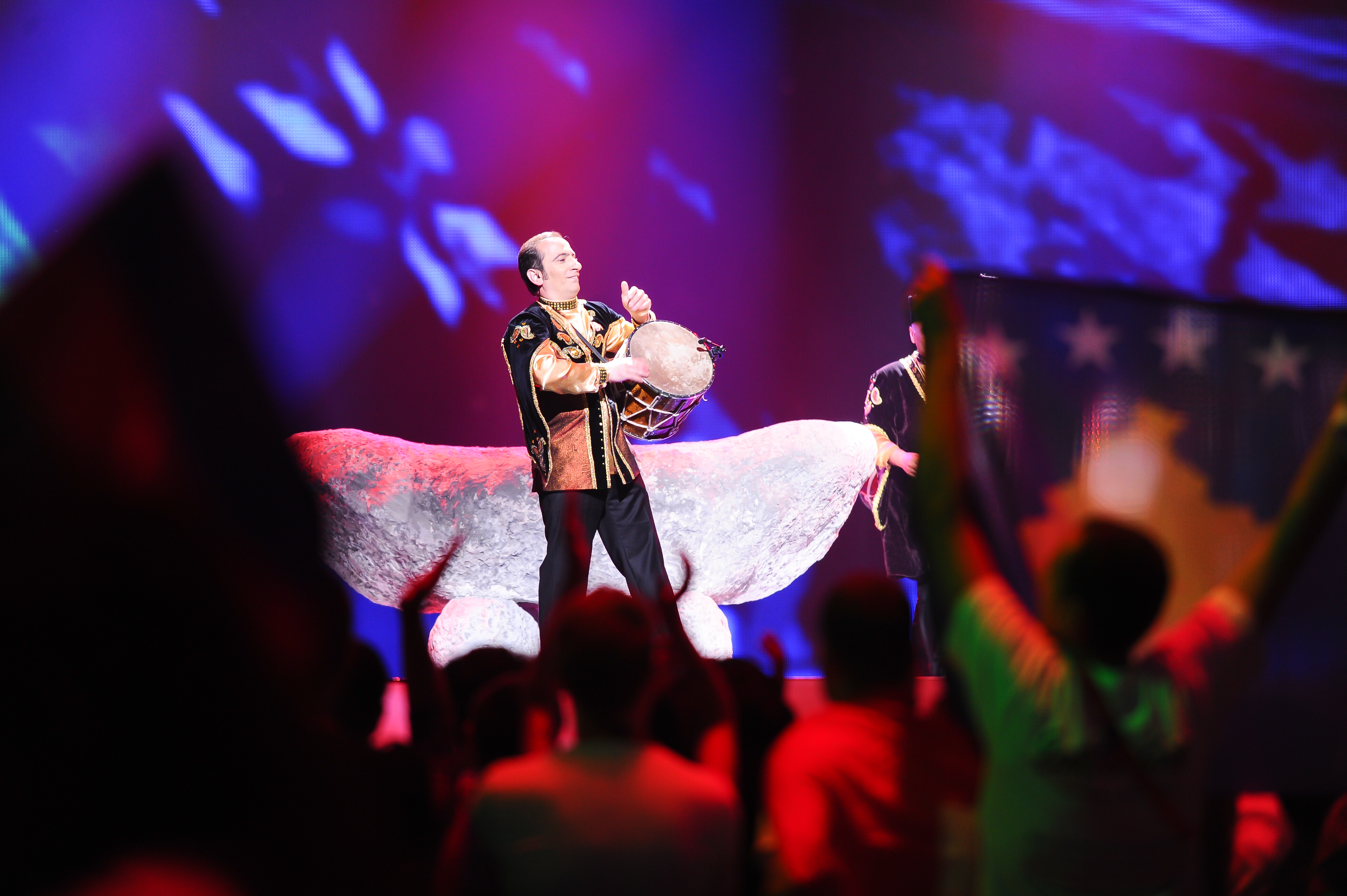
Natig Shirinov's performing at Eurovision Song Contest 2012.

- Habil Aliyev
- Ramiz Guliyev
- Avtandil Israfilov
- Elchin Hashimov
- Kamil Jalilov
- Bahram Mansurov
- Gurban Pirimov
- Rəmiş
- Sadigjan
- Alihan Samedov

== See also ==
- Sari Gelin
- Mugham
- Azerbaijani pop music
