= Talwar Gallery =

Contemporary art gallery

Coordinates: 40.735502°N 73.988804°W

- Established: 2001
- Type: Art gallery
- Owner: Deepak Talwar
- Website: talwargallery.com

Talwar Gallery, founded by Deepak Talwar, is a contemporary art gallery that opened in New York City in September 2001 and in New Delhi in 2007.

The institution primarily represent artists from the Indian subcontinent and its diaspora, including Rummana Hussain, Nasreen Mohamedi, Alwar Balasubramaniam, Al-An deSouza, Alia Syed, Anjum Singh, Arpita Singh, Muhanned Cader, N. N. Rimzon, Kartik Sood, Sheila Makhijani, and Paramjit Singh.

== Talwar New York ==
Since opening in September 2001, Talwar Gallery NY has presented the first solo exhibitions of artists that have since been the focus of major museum exhibitions and collections. Talwar Gallery presented the first solo exhibition in the US of Nasreen Mohamedi (1937–90) in 2003. It was Mohamedi's first solo exhibition outside India and the first ever of her photographs. The Gallery presented Mohamedi again in 2008 and 2013 in two solo exhibitions. Talwar NY also presented the first solo exhibition in the US of Ranjani Shettar in 2004.

== Publications ==
- 2021: Alwar Balasubramaniam, BALA, text by Vesela Sretenović, Alwar Balasubramaniam, and Deepak Talwar
- 2019: Arpita Singh, Tying down time, text by Ella Datta and Deepak Talwar
- 2017: Ranjani Shettar, Between the sky and earth, text by Catherine deZegher, Ranjani Shettar, Deepak Talwar, Talwar Gallery
- 2009: Nasreen Mohamedi, the grid, unplugged, text by Geeta Kapur, Deepak Talwar, Anders Kreuger, John Yau, Talwar Gallery
- 2009: Alwar Balasubramaniam, (In)between, text by Deepak Talwar, Talwar Gallery
- 2008: Allan deSouza, A Decade of Photoworks, texts by Allan deSouza, Eve Oishi, Moi Tsien, Luis Francia, Steven Nelson, Talwar Gallery
- 2005: Nasreen Mohamedi, Lines Among Lines, Drawing Papers 52, texts by Geeta Kapur, Susette Min, Drawing Center
- 2005: (Desi)re, Talwar Gallery, 2005
