= Shamistan Alizamanli =

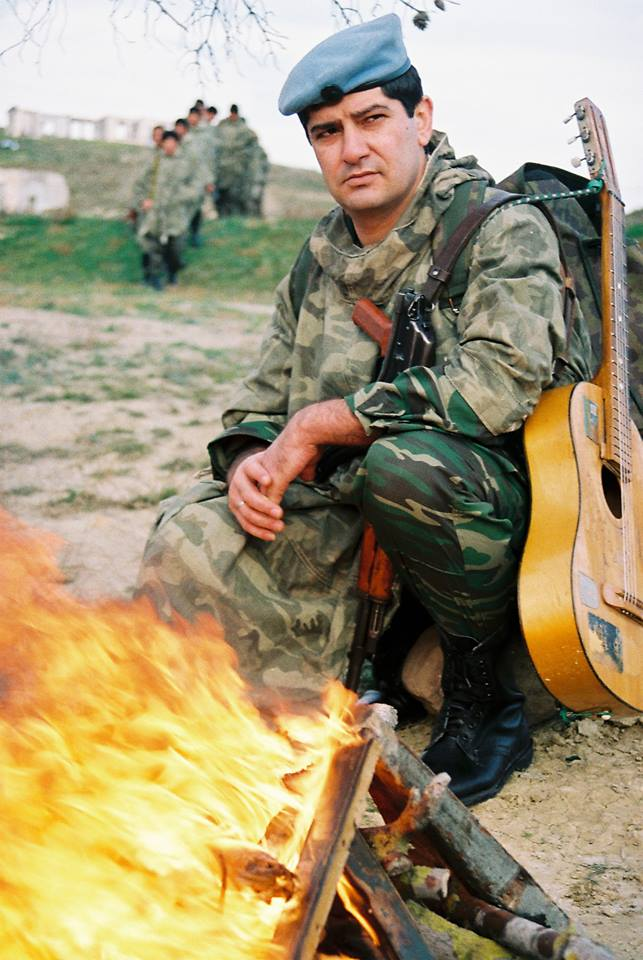

Background information
- Born: Şəmistan Əlizamanlı; February 4, 1959 (age 67); Marneuli, Georgian SSR, Soviet Union
- Origin: Azerbaijan
- Occupations: Singer, artist reading of the texts, presenter
- Instruments: Bass guitar
- Years active: 1988–present

Shamistan Hüseyn oğlu Alizamanli (Şəmistan Hüseyn oğlu Əlizamanlı; born February 4, 1959) is a military speaker of the Republic of Azerbaijan, the author of patriotic songs, elocutionist and radio and television presenter.

== Profile ==
Shamistan Alizamanli graduated from the Azerbaijan State University of Culture and Arts. He started to work as an announcer on Azerbaijani television and radio. Then he was sent to Moscow to continue his studies. He graduated and won the first prize in the Soviet Union by his talent as an announcer.

== Music career ==
In 1993, he began his singing career. He interpreted military and patriotic songs, such as "Brave soldier" ("İgid əsgər"), "Mr. Lieutenant" ("Cənab Leytenant"), "First battalion" ("Birinci batalyon"), "Falcons" ("Şahinlər") "Property of homeland" ("Vətən əmanəti") etc.

== Albums ==
- Motherland is calling! ("Çağırır vətən")
- Property of homeland ("Vətən əmanəti")
- The Motherland ("Ana yurdum")

== Music videos ==
- Give us the way Caucasus Mountains!! ("Qafqaz dağı yol ver bizə")
- Brave soldier ("Igid Əsgər")
- Worried Black Sea ("Çırpınırdı Qara dəniz")
- Gulistan ("Gülüstan")
- Either Karabakh or death ("Ya Qarabağ Ya Ölüm")

== Filmography ==
These films were broadcast by voice Shamistan Alizamanli:

1. "Strange people bring bad news" (Bəd xəbərlər gətirən qəribə adamlar) - film, 1993
2. "Gudyalchay" (Qudyalçay) - film, 2001
3. "Keroglu" (Koroğlu) - film, 2003
4. "Great commanders" (Dahi sərkərdələr) - film, United Kingdom, 2003

== See also ==
- Chingiz Mustafayev
- Azerbaijani folk music
- Azerbaijani pop music
