= Sheyla =

Sheyla is a given name. Notable people with the name include:

- Sheyla Bonnick, Jamaican singer and performer, active since 1975
- Sheyla Tadeo (born 1973), Mexican actress, comedian, and singer

== See also ==
- Sheila
- Shela (name)
