= Shela =

Shela may refer to:

- Shela (name), a human personal name closely related to "Shelah"
- "Shela" (song), a 1985 song by the American band Aerosmith
- Shela, Tibet, a village in the Tibet Autonomous Region of China
- the village of Shela on Lamu Island, Kenya
- Shela (artist), Japanese pop artist
- An old-fashioned Australian slang term for "woman" or "girl"
- Rav Shela, Babylonian Amora

== See also ==
- Shelah (disambiguation)
- Shelagh (disambiguation)
- Sheela (disambiguation)
