= Shelagh =

Shelagh (alternatively spelled Sheila, Sheilagh and Sheelagh) is a common feminine given name, derived from the Irish name Síle, which is believed to be a Gaelic form of the Latin name Caelia, the feminine form of the Roman clan name Caelius, meaning 'heavenly'.

Shelagh may refer to:

- Shelagh Alexander (1959–2018), Canadian artist known for her photographic works
- Shelagh Armstrong (born 1961), Canadian illustrator
- Shelagh Burrow (born 1950), English diver
- Shelagh Delaney (1939–2011), British playwright
- Shelagh Fogarty (born 1966), British radio and television presenter and journalist
- Shelagh Fraser (1920–2000), British actress
- Shelagh McCall, Scottish lawyer
- Shelagh McDonald (born 1948), Scottish folk singer, songwriter and guitarist
- Shelagh McLeod (born 1960), British-based Canadian film and television actress and director
- Shelagh Rogers (born 1956), Canadian radio broadcaster
- Shelagh Stephenson, British playwright

== See also ==
- Shelah (disambiguation)
- Shela (disambiguation)
- Sheila
- Sheilagh
