= Eyyub Yaqubov =

Azerbaijani singer (born 1965)

Eyyub Yaqubov Əyyub Zəkəriyyə oğlu Yaqubov
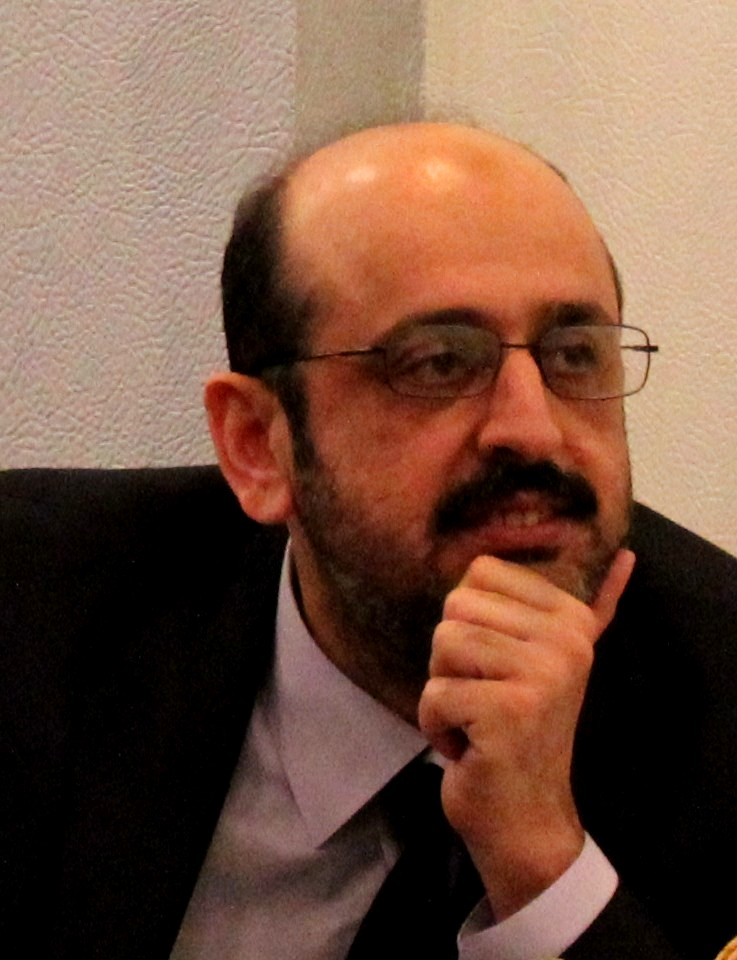

Background information
- Born: April 26, 1965 (age 61); Bayil, Baku, Azerbaijan SSR, USSR
- Genres: Pop, Baku chanson
- Occupations: Singer, songwriter
- Instrument: Voice
- Years active: 1990s–present
- Label: Mikpro LLC

Eyyub Yaqubov (Azerbaijani: Əyyub Yaqubov, born April 26, 1965, Baku, Azerbaijan SSR, USSR) is a popular Azerbaijani singer. He is widely known for bringing the Baku chanson genre to popularity in 1992.

== Early life and education ==
Eyyub Yaqubov was born in the Bayil settlement of Baku. His strong interest in music led him to attend Music School. After completing his general education in 1980, he enrolled in the Asaf Zeynally Music Technical School, specializing in piano.

While studying at the technical school, Yaqubov worked as a pianist in the "Humayun" folk instrumental ensemble led by Alibaba Mammadov. He performed with this ensemble in concerts across Azerbaijan.

At the age of 14, Yaqubov won first place in a competition for Azerbaijani pianists while still in the 7th grade of Music School No. 3. Alongside classical music, he also learned Azerbaijani folk music in the ensemble. During this time, he occasionally sang, performing for friends and acquaintances. Though initially aspiring to be a pianist, he later decided to become a singer, disillusioned by the lack of recognition for musicians' hard work in the industry.

== Personal life ==
In 1992, Yaqubov married and has a son named Zakir.

== Awards ==
- Honored Artist of Azerbaijan (May 16, 2006)
- People's Artist of Azerbaijan (May 27, 2018)

== Discography ==
- 1999 – Duet Amburan
- 2000 – Aghabala Chaykovsky
- 2001 – Ana
- 2002 – Eyyub Yaqubov
- 2003 – Unutdun
- 2003 – Sechmeler
- 2003 – Odin Raz Zhivem
- 2004 – Alishdim
- 2006 – Extra
