= Shelia =

Shelia is a given name. Notable people with the name include:

- Shelia Burrell (born 1972), retired American heptathlete
- Shelia Conover (born 1963), American sprint canoeist
- Shelia Eddy (born 1995), American convicted of murder
- Shelia Goss (born 1968), American author, freelance writer, and screenwriter
- Shelia Guberman (born 1930), Russian scientist in computer science, nuclear physics, geology, geophysics, medicine, and perception
- Shelia Jordan, the Mayor of Galway from 1977 to 1978
- Shelia P. Moses, African-American writer whose subjects include comedian Dick Gregory and Buddy Bush

== See also ==
- Murtaz Shelia (born 1969), former football defender who was capped 29 times for Georgia
- Sheila, a feminine given name
