= Shelach =

Shelach can mean:

- Salat, the five daily ritual prayers that Muslims offer to Allah (God)
- Shlach, the 37th weekly parshah or portion in the annual Jewish cycle of Torah reading and the fourth in the book of Numbers

== See also ==
- Shelah (disambiguation)
