= Anjum Singh =

Indian artist (1967–2020)

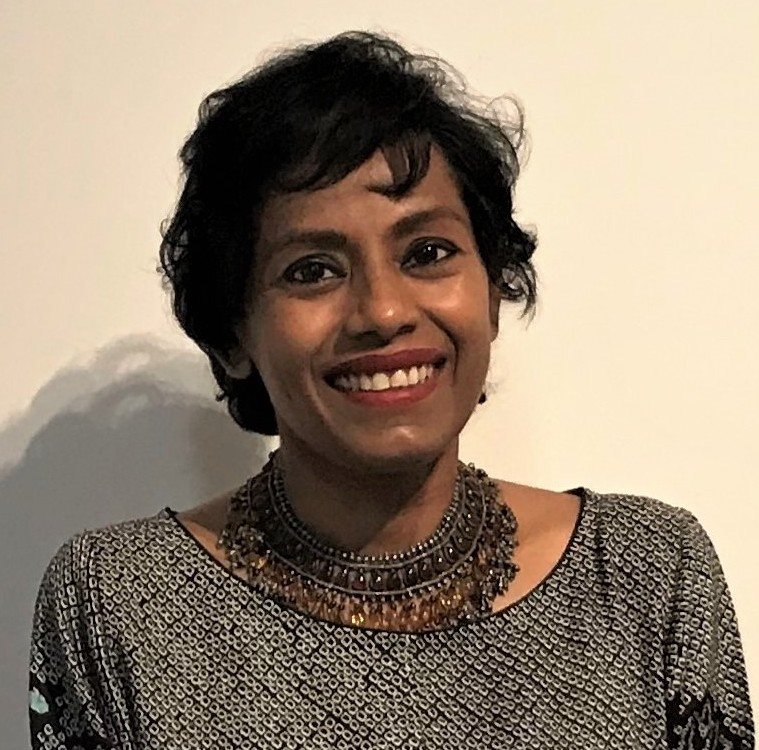
- Singh in 2019
- Born: 1967; New Delhi, India
- Died: 17 November 2020 (aged 53); New Delhi, India
- Education: Bachelor of fine arts (Shantiniketan) (1989); Master of fine arts (Delhi University) (1991)
- Known for: Visual arts
- Parents: Paramjit Singh (father); Arpita Singh (mother)

Anjum Singh (1967 – 17 November 2020) was an Indian artist whose works focused on urban ecology, environmental degradation, and her own struggles with cancer. She was born in New Delhi, India, and she continued to live and work there. Singh was the daughter of Indian artists Arpita Singh and Paramjit Singh.

== Early life ==
Singh was born to artists Arpita Singh and Paramjit Singh in New Delhi in 1967. She graduated with a Bachelor of Fine Arts from Kala Bhavana in Shantiniketan. She received her Master of Fine Arts from the College of Art at the Delhi University in 1991. She went on to study painting and print-making at the Corcoran School of the Arts and Design in Washington, D.C., between 1992 and 1994.

== Career ==
Singh noted the Hungarian-Indian artist Amrita Sher-Gil as amongst her first artistic influences with her early works focusing on figurative motifs. Her works later focused on urban ecology and environmental degradation. They were exhibited in solo shows across India, Singapore, and the US, as well as group exhibitions in Melbourne, Cairo and London, in addition to other cities in India. In a review of her first individual showing in New York in 2002, The New York Times mentioned, "With their lucid forms and appetizing colors, the six paintings in Anjum Singh's New York solo debut make an instantly welcoming first impression, though they tend to keep their meanings in reserve."

She was a recipient of the Charles Wallace Trust Fellowship for a residency at Gasworks Studios, London, in 2002–03 and had earlier also won an award at the Sahitya Kala Parishad's Yuva Mahotsava in 1991.

Her last exhibition, held in September 2019 at Talwar Gallery in New Delhi and titled I am still here, was autobiographical with her depiction of her own body and her illness due to cancer. The paintings used oil on mixed media. In a review The Hindu mentioned, "It is one of the most well-hung exhibitions of the season, presenting dramatic views of individual paintings and compelling groupings of works on paper."

Some of her works included Bleed Bled Blood Red (2015), Heart (Machine) (2016), and Blackness (2016). Singh died from cancer on 17 November 2020 in New Delhi, aged 53.
