= Arpita Singh =

Indian artist (1937–2026)

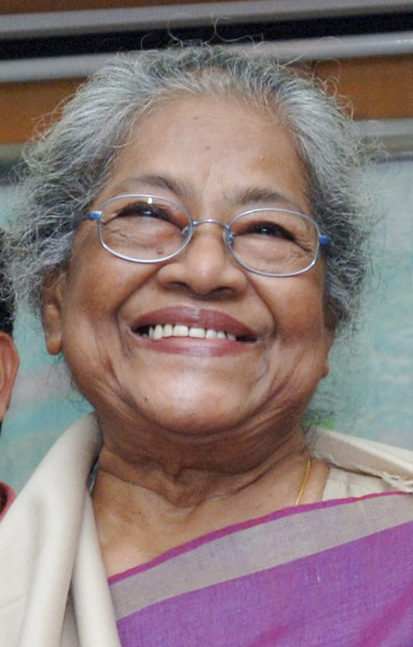
- Singh in 2014
- Born: Arpita Dutta; 22 June 1937; Baranagar, Bengal Province, British India
- Died: 9 November 2026 (aged 89)
- Spouse: Paramjit Singh (m. 1962)
- Children: Anjum Singh
- Awards: Padma Bhushan (2011); Fellowship of Lalit Kala Akademi (2014)

Arpita Singh (née Dutta; 22 June 1937 – 9 November 2026) was an Indian artist. Known as a figurative artist and a modernist, she created canvases to have both a story line and a carnival of images arranged in a curiously subversive manner. Her artistic approach can be described as an expedition without destination. Singh's work reflected her background. She brought her inner vision of emotions to the art inspired by her own background and what she saw around the society that mainly affects women. Her works also included traditional Indian art forms and aesthetics, such as miniature painting and different forms of folk art, which she included them regularly.

== Background ==
Arpita Dutta was born on 22 June 1937 in Baranagar, Bengal Province (now West Bengal). She left the city with her mother and brother in 1946, a year before India got its independence from the British rule in 1947. In 1962, she married fellow artist Paramjit Singh and they had a daughter, artist Anjum Singh.

Singh lived in Nizamuddin East, New Delhi. She died on 9 November 2026, at the age of 89.

== Education ==
Arpita attended the Delhi Polytechnic in New Delhi from 1954 to '59 and graduated with a Diploma in Fine Arts.

== Career ==
After graduating, Arpita Singh worked at the Weavers' Service Centre under the, Ministry of Textiles, Government of India in New Delhi and experienced the textiles industry closely. Her stint as a textile designer reflects in her work. The Talwar Gallery showcased her works in their first ever exhibition, 'Tying Down Time', dedicated to Arpita Singh in 2017.

Singh took on a job with the Cottage Industries Restoration Program, a body of the Government of India. While she worked in the program, she met traditional artists and weavers of India. This is said to have impacted her artwork too.

She made significant contributions through a different social and political awareness. Singh was a founder member of the artists' group 'The Unknown', along with other alumni of the Department of Fine Arts of Delhi Polytechnic in the 1960s. The first group show of 'The Unknown' was held at IENS Building (now INS Building) at Rafi Marg, New Delhi in 1962.

=== First exhibition ===
Arpita Singh's first exhibition was held at Kunika Chemould Gallery, organised by Roshan Alkazi, New Delhi in 1972.

=== Exhibitions thereafter ===
Post-1972, Singh extensively showed her work at Royal Academy of Arts at London (1982), the Centre Georges Pompidou, Paris (1986), show in Geneva (1987) and at the Art Gallery of New South Wales Sydney (1993). She has also participated in the 3rd and 4th Trienniale of New Delhi & at the Havana Biennial in 1987 and the Indo-Greek Cultural Exhibition, in Greece, 1984.

From 1987-89, Arpita organised and participated in the exhibition titled 'Through The Looking Glass' with her contemporaries, the women artists Nalini Malani, Nilima Sheikh, and Madhvi Parekh. The exhibition, featuring works by all four artists, travelled to five non-commercial venues across India. Inspired by a meeting in 1979 with Nancy Spero, May Stevens and Ana Mendieta at the AIR Gallery in New York (the first all-female artists’ cooperative gallery in the US), Malani had planned to organise an exhibition entirely of works by women artists, which failed to materialise due to a lack of interest and support.

Her works have been exhibited at ‘Modern and Contemporary Indian Art’ at Vadehra Art Gallery, New Delhi, 2006; 'Progressive to Altermodern: 62 Years of Indian Modern Art' at Grosvenor Gallery, London, 2009; 'Kalpana: Figurative Art in India' presented by the Indian Council for Cultural Relations (ICCR) at Aicon Gallery, London, 2009; 'The Root of Everything' at Gallery Mementos, Bangalore, 2009.

Her later and select solo exhibitions included Work on Paper at Vadehra Art Gallery, 2016.

Singh's work was also included in a 2019 retrospective at the Kiran Nadar Museum of Art (KNMA), the 2021 exhibition Women in Abstraction at the Centre Pompidou and the Guggenheim Bilbao, the 2022 exhibition Women Painting Women at the Modern Art Museum of Fort Worth, the 2024 exhibition The Imaginary Institution of India at The Barbican Centre, and the 2025 exhibition Remembering at the Serpentine Galleries.

=== Style ===
Singh's early paintings were mainly water colors on paper. She would paint usually in black and white ink.

By the 1980s, she started to paint Bengali folk paintings with women as the focus. She would use vibrant colors in a rather restrained way and her palette is usually dominated by pinks and blues. Her paintings would show women doing daily work and following simple routines in their lives. Arpita would draw daily use objects like trees, flowers, flower vases, animals, teapots, pillows, festoons and flags, and show women surrounded by them. Child Bride with Swan (1985) and Girl Smoking Cigarette (1985) are examples of her protagonists, leading uncomplicated lives and deaths.

In the 1990s, Arpita's style of painting shifted to oil on canvas, but she continued to paint women-centric art. A lot of women emotions started to become evident in her paintings - Joy, sorrow, hope, and many more. She painted a series of paintings on the subject "Women with a Girl Child" in the last decade of 20th century. Arpita would showcase the problems like hatred, social injustice, etc. faced by a contemporary woman in her art. She would also paint around the ills related to girl child in India. In some of her paintings the women appear nude, but her paintings do not have sexual overtones and reflect the woman's vulnerability.

== Reception ==
=== Awards ===
Singh exhibited all over the world, at both individual and group exhibits. She also won a number of awards for her work. Those include:

- 2014 – Fellowship of Lalit Kala Akademi
- 2011 – Padma Bhushan
- 1998–1999: Kalidas Samman, Bhopal
- 1991 – Parishad Samman, Sahitya Kala Parishad, New Delhi
- Singh is listed in Hurun India 2025 Women Leaders.

== Publications ==
2018: Arpita Singh: Tying down time, Talwar Gallery
