= Bayil =

Bayil Bayıl
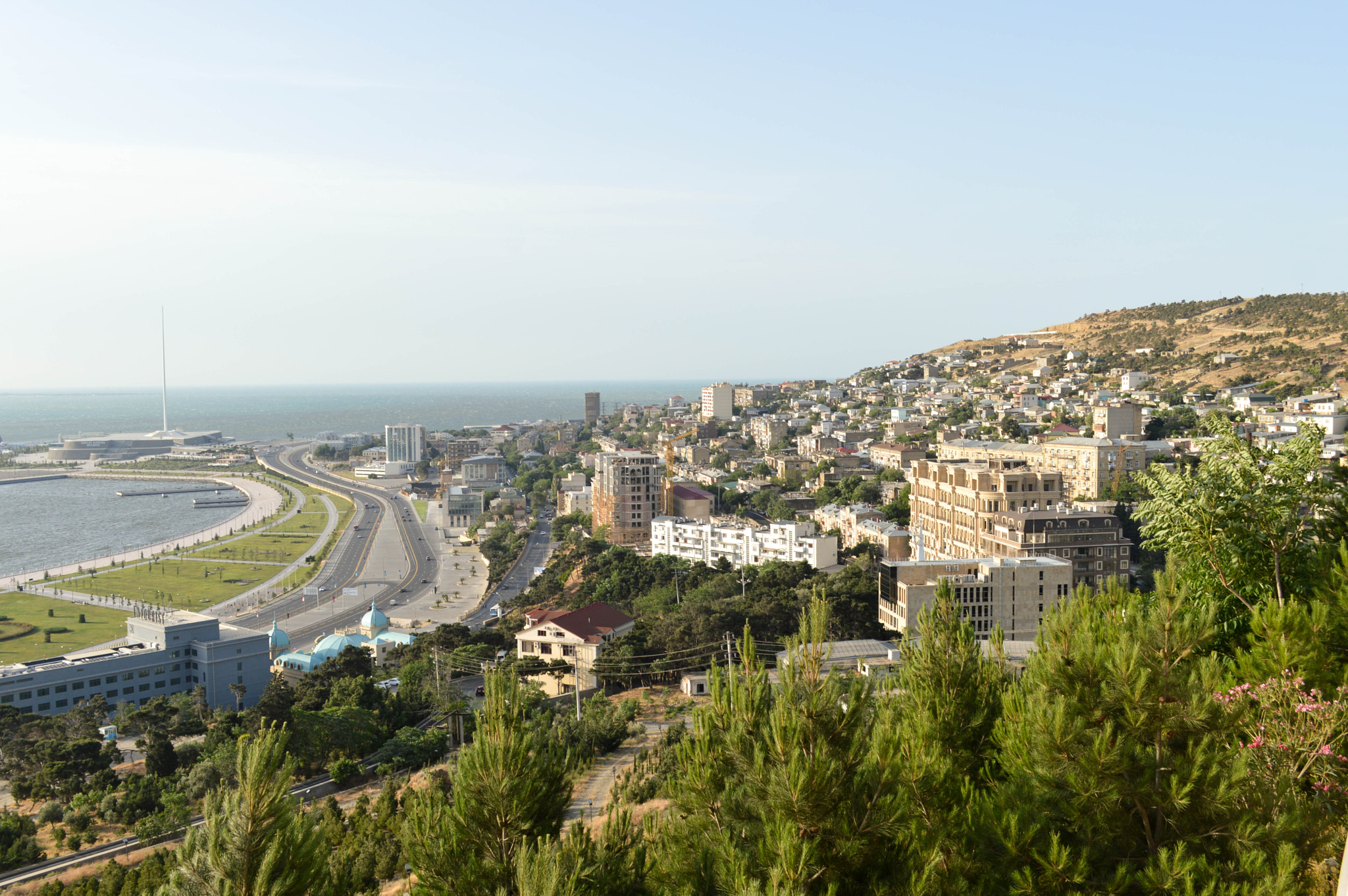
- View of Bayil

- Location within Azerbaijan
- Coordinates: 40°21′N 49°50′E
- Country: Azerbaijan
- District: Sabail District, Baku

Area
  - Total: 29 km^{2} (11 sq mi)

Population (2016)
  - Total: 105,000
- Time zone: UTC+4 (AZT)
  - Summer (DST): UTC+5 (AZT)

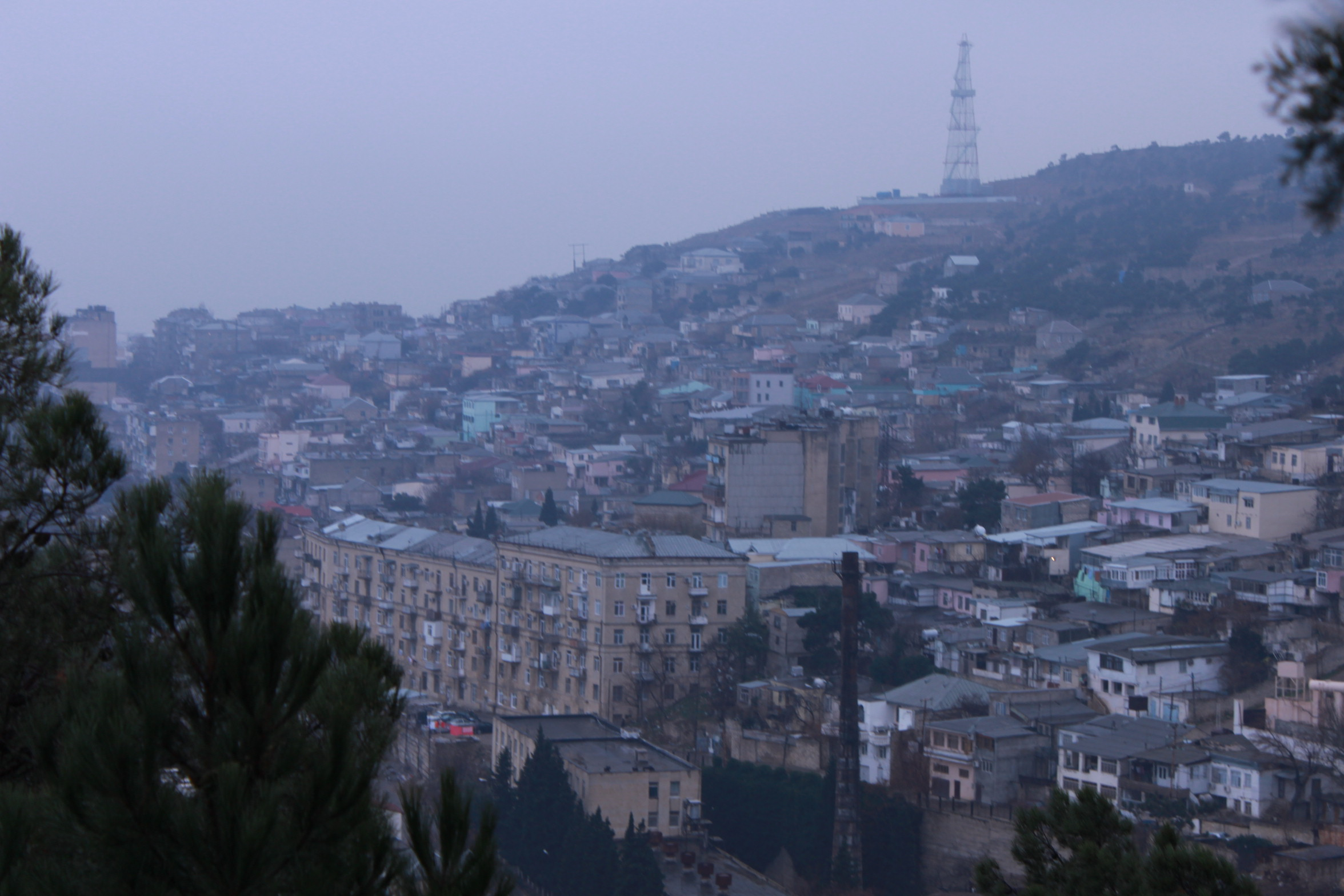
Bayil Slope

Bayil (Azerbaijani: Bayıl; also known as Bailov and Bailovo) is a settlement in Baku, Azerbaijan.

== Geography ==
In March 2000, a major landslide in the Bayil slope destroyed dozens of shops, apartments, and gas stations. The slope in later years also experienced a few minor landslides, which led the Baku City Administration to examine the area and make a final decision on razing houses in this territory.

Neighborhoods are largely composed of block after block of picturesque rowhouses and a few mansions, hotels and some office buildings.

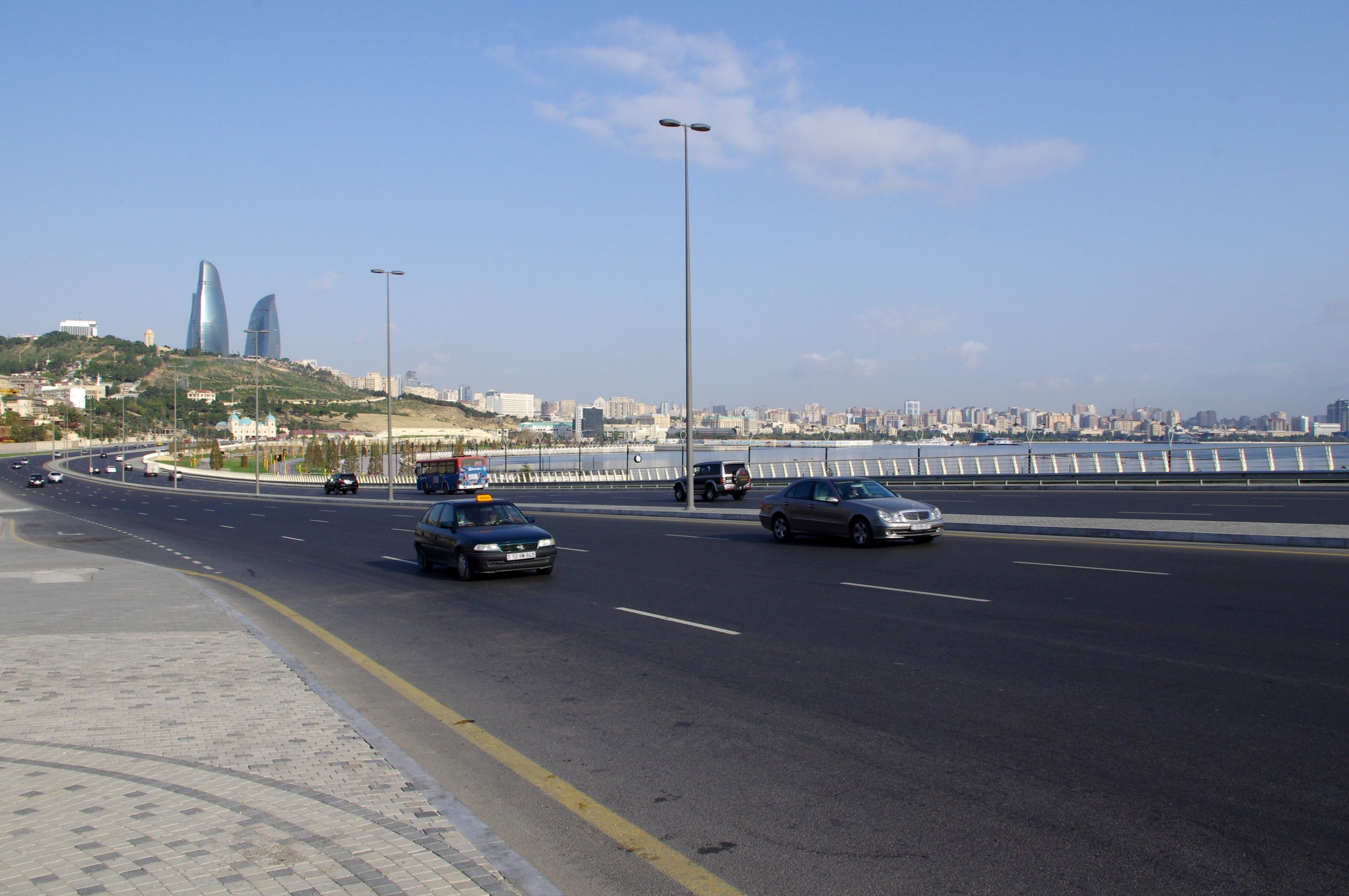
Coastal road to Bayil

== History ==
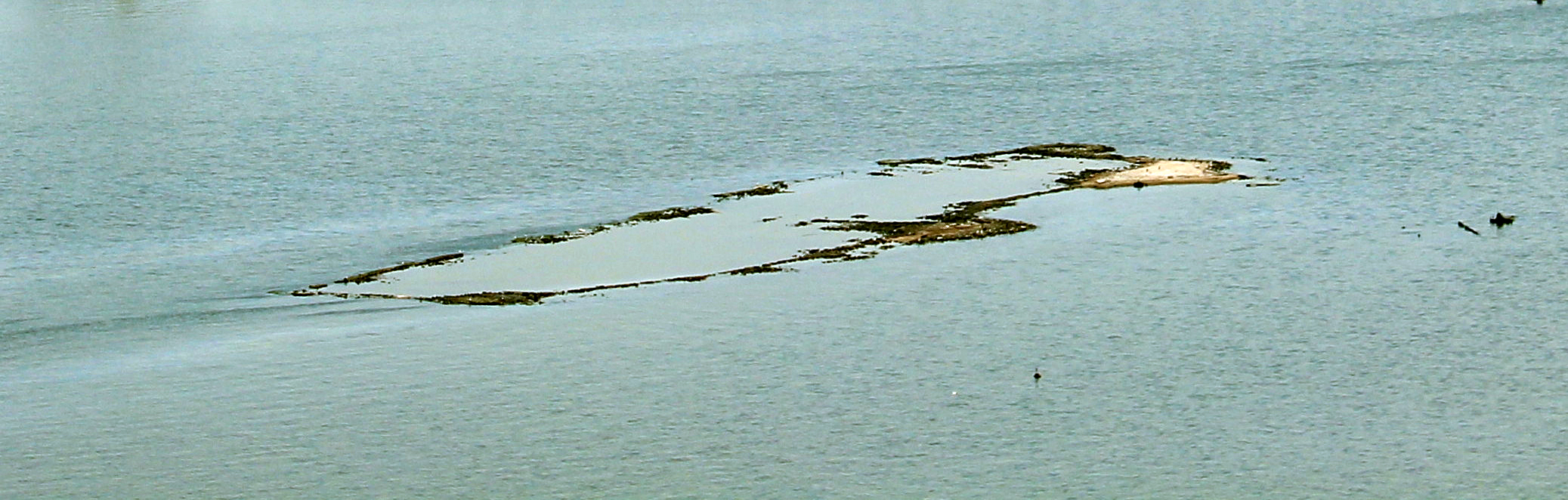
Remains of Sabayil Castle

In 1235, Shirvanshah Fariburzom III constructed a building in Bayil Bay, later named Sabayil Castle. The area was also called Shahri Saba, Shahri nau, and the underwater city, and was associated with a caravanserai and the Bayil stones.

In 1858, Marine Administration of Russian Empire began construction of municipality on local admiralty's drafts. On 6 May 1868 in Cape Bayil, in the presence of Grand Duke Alexei Alexandrovich of Russia, a five-domed church.

The first residential areas in the Bayil formed along the pilgrimage road that passes on Bayil Cape and leads to the Bibi-Heybat Mosque. Development of the Black City and the discovery of oil fields in the Bibiheybət stimulated the expansion of Bayil in the direction of Baku.

By the late 19th century, residential part of the occupied steep slopes had developed in the direction of the city, which went beyond the boundaries of their land and merged with the surrounding areas, with the center Bayil being kept in the Baku International Sea Trade Port area.

Despite the extensive construction in the direction of Baku and economic relationship with the capital, Bayil until 1912 remained legally independent maritime province.

In 1900, Leonid Krasin arrived at Bayil at the invitation of Robert Classon. He became deputy head of the construction of the Bayil Thermal power station and controlled it after completion of construction until 1904.

In 2010, restoration works are held at the Bayil stadium with 3000 attendance after the Association of Football Federations of Azerbaijan's proposal to increase popularity in Baku.

In 2011, government unveiled the restored Gafur Mammadov Park on Victory Day.

== Landmarks ==
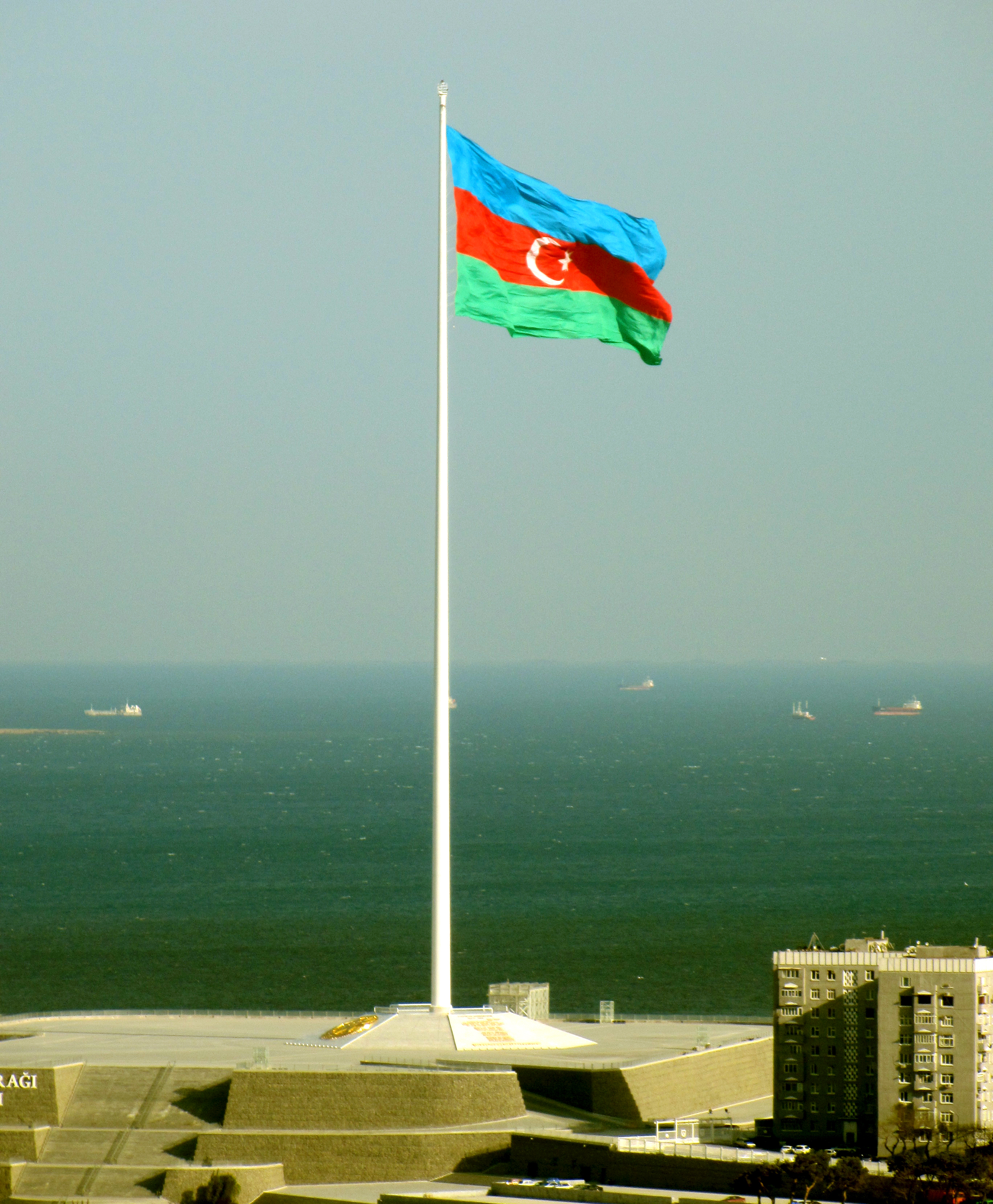
National Flag Square.

Bayil is the site of National Flag Square. Confirmed by the Guinness Book of Records, the flag flies on a pole 162 meters high and measures 70 by 35 meters, which made it at the time the world's highest flag. Baku Crystal Hall, which hosted Eurovision Song Contest 2012, is located next to it.

The development of the area replaced another landmark, Bayil prison—one of the Russian Empire's and USSR's strictest prisons and the same prison in which Joseph Stalin was kept in the early years of the 20th century by the Tsarist authorities because of his criminal activities in Baku, organizing oil worker strikes. Another famous inmate was Andrey Vyshinsky, who was imprisoned for revolutionary activities and where he first met Stalin.

The former "Intourist" hotel, opened in 1934, has been Baku's favorite place for 70 years of operation. Even in the 1950s and 1960s, the most famous hotel in Baku was "Intourist". The new hotel, Sheraton Baku Intourist, which was completed in 2015, attracts attention with its unique architectural structure, while keeping alive the memories of the old "Intourist".

The area also contains the main naval base of the Azerbaijani Navy.

== Education ==
Public schools

- № 3 Baku School (1st Grade – 11th Grade)
- №49 Baku School (1st Grade – 11th Grade)
- №91 Baku School (1st Grade – 11th Grade)
- №163 Baku School (1st Grade – 11th Grade)
- №203 Baku School (1st Grade – 11th Grade)

== Transportation ==
=== Road ===
The E119 Highway by pass Bayil.

=== Metro ===
The Yellow line of S-9 Bayil Metro Station is planned in this area by Baku Metro in the future.

=== Tram ===
The Tram Line is planned in this area in the future.

== Notable residents ==
- Eyyub Yaqubov, singer.
- Fuad Viento, writer.
