= Ranjani Shettar =

Indian artist (1977)

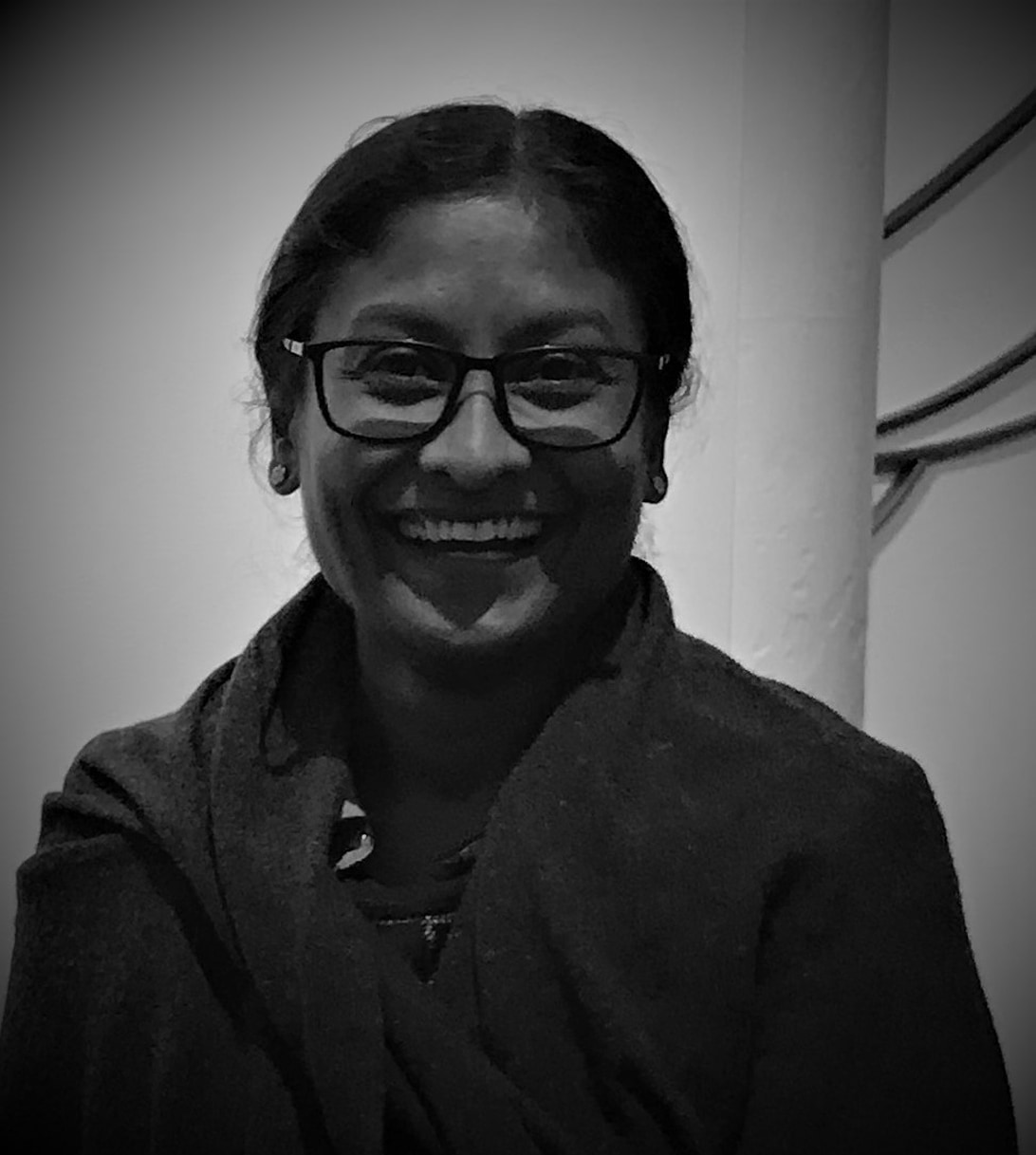
- Indian artist Ranjani Shettar
- Born: 1977 (age 48–49); Bangalore, India
- Education: Bachelor of Fine Arts (BFA), Master of Fine Arts (MFA)
- Known for: Large-scale sculptural installations using a combination of natural and industrial materials

Ranjani Shettar (born 1977) is an Indian visual artist known for her large-scale sculptural installations.

Her work has been exhibited at The Metropolitan Museum of Art, the Museum of Modern Art (MoMA), the San Francisco Museum of Modern Art, the Barbican Centre, the Fondation Hermes in Singapore, and the Cartier Fondation in Paris. It has also been in exhibitions including the 55th Carnegie International and the 61st Venice Biennale. Her works are in the permanent collections of The Metropolitan Museum of Art and The Guggenheim Museums and Foundation.

== Personal life and education ==
Shettar was born in 1977 in Bangalore, Karnataka, India. She earned her Bachelors of Fine Arts and Masters of Fine Arts in Sculpture from the College of Fine Art, Karnataka Chitrakala Parishath, completing her studies in 1998 and 2000, respectively. Shettar currently lives and works in Karnataka, India.

== Career ==
Shettar's first solo exhibition, Indian Spring, was held in 2004 at the Talwar Gallery in New York City.

Her work has been the subject of publications from institutions such as the National Gallery of Victoria, Melbourne, and from galleries like the Talwar and Marian Goodman Gallery.

Shettar has received multiple recognitions for her practice, including the Hebbar Foundation Award (1999, 2003), the Charles Wallace Trust Award (2004), the Sanskriti Award (2008), and the Aditya Vikram Birla Kalakiran Puraskar (2011).

In 2023, the Barbican Centre in London presented Shettar's first major institutional exhibition in Europe, titled Cloud Songs on the Horizon, featuring a series of expansive suspended sculptures throughout the Conservatory.

In 2026, Shettar was one of five artists selected to represent India at the Venice Biennale. The work she displayed was titled Under the same sky (2026), a handmade garden composed of fabric, steel, and lacquer flowers.

== Work ==
Shettar's work incorporates a range of materials, including beeswax, wood, organic dyes, vegetal pastes, lacquer, steel, and cloth, which she uses to construct large-scale installations. Her approach often draws from Indian craft traditions, incorporating methods that reflect historical techniques.

Her sculptures often feature hand-carved wood, with attention to maintaining the material's original surface and texture.

Shettar's practice also includes wall-mounted wood compositions. An example is Touch Me Not (2006–2007), which is held in the Kiran Nadar Museum of Art collection.

Her site-specific installations include works like Seven Ponds and a Few Rain Drops (2017), which became part of the permanent collection at the Metropolitan Museum of Art in 2018. Another example is Sing Along (2008–2009), which is in the Kiran Nadar Museum of Art collection.

Shettar has also developed works made from hand-formed wax elements connected with cotton thread. One such work, Just a Bit More (2005–2006), now in the collection of the Museum of Modern Art (MoMA) in New York, uses these materials to form a web-like composition.

Shettar has also worked with industrial materials. Her sculpture titled Me, No, Not Me, Buy Me, Eat Me, Wear Me, Have Me, Me, No, Not Me (2006–2007) was included in the inaugural exhibition of the rooftop sculpture garden at the San Francisco Museum of Modern Art.

While primarily known for sculpture, Shettar has worked in other media. Varsha, an artist's book, was developed in partnership with the Museum of Modern Art. In 2021, she created the print Alae alae as part of The Metropolitan Museum of Art's 150th anniversary projects.

Other notable presentations of her work include Earth Songs for a Night Sky at The Phillips Collection (May - August 2019), Dewdrops and Sunshine at The National Gallery of Victoria (November 2011 - February 2012), MOMENTUM 10 at the Institute of Contemporary Art in Boston (March - July 2008),and FOCUS at the Modern Art Museum of Fort Worth (December 2008 - February 2009).
