= Sabayil Castle =

Submerged fortress in Azerbaijan

Coordinates: 40°21′11″N 49°50′27″E

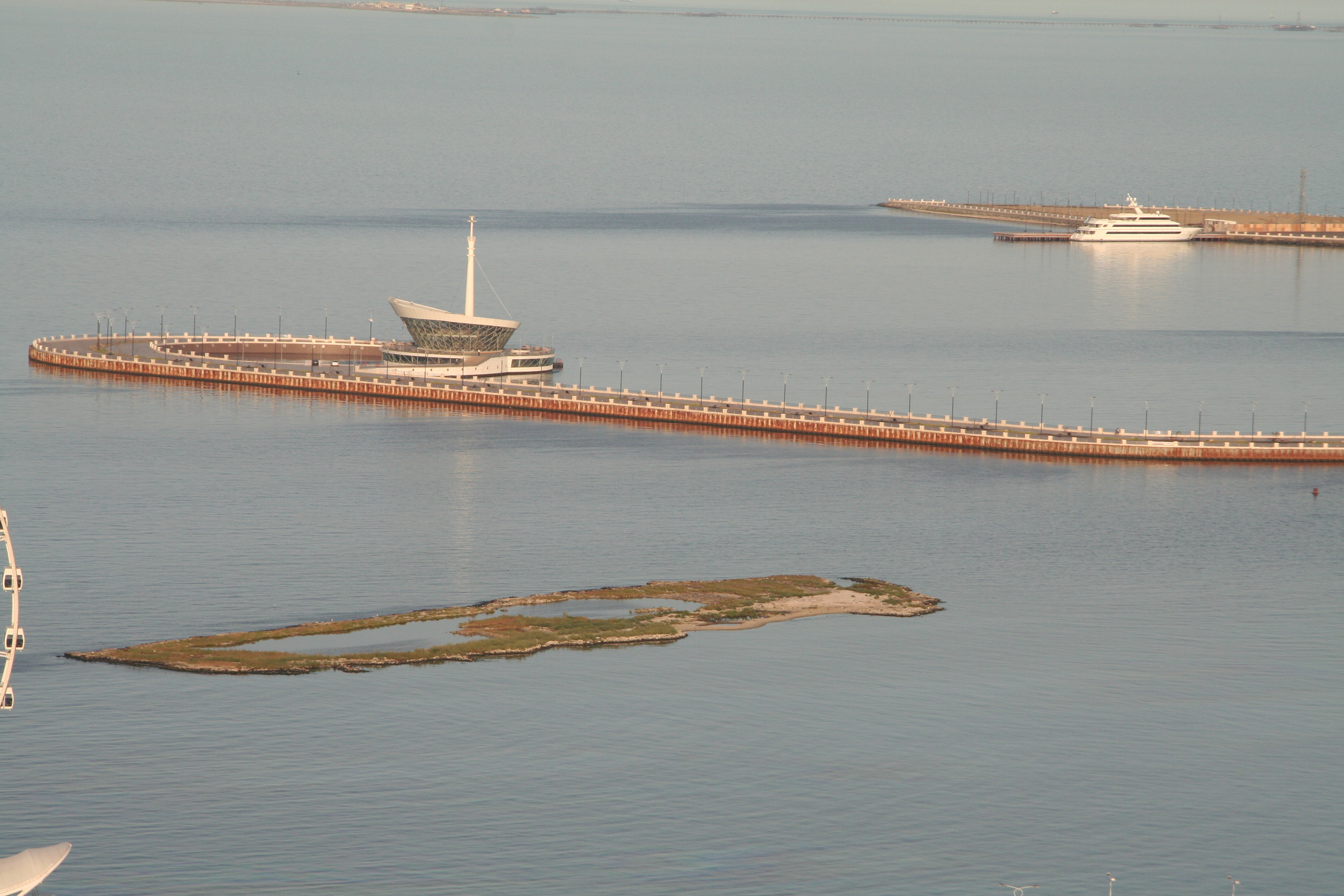
The vestiges of Sabayil Fortress as seen from the Baku Boulevard, with modern marina structures behind

Sabayil Castle is a submerged medieval fortress on the coast of the Caspian Sea near Baku, Azerbaijan.

The castle is named after the surrounding area of Bayil. The structure is also known as the "Atlantis of the Caspian Sea". Research scientists have referred to it as Sabayil castle, Bayil castle or Bandargala, and have described it as an underground town, caravanserai, cloister, monastery, custom house or defence castle.

== History ==
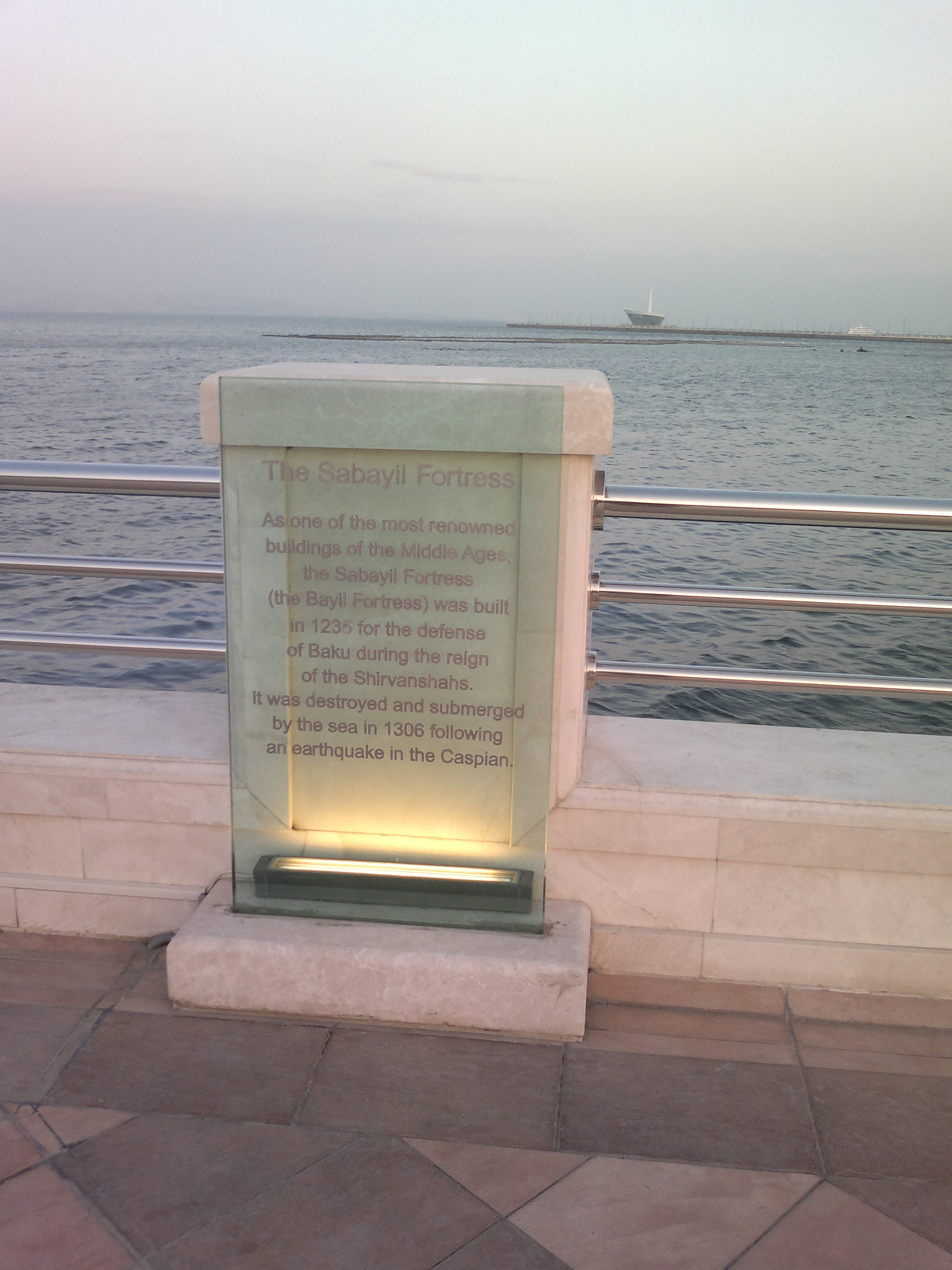
Sabayil Fortress' description in Baku Boulevard

The castle was built on one of the Bayil hills near the Caspian Sea coast in 1232–33, during the life of Fariburz, son of Shirvanshah Garsasb, by architect Abdul-Majid Masud oglu. At the same time, in 1232, this architect also built the round castle in Mardakan, which was part of Abseron's integrated defence system, defending the city and Bayil Castle from the north. Some archaeologists suggested the castle belonged to the Shirvanshahs.

During a major earthquake in the capital city of Baku in 1306, the building collapsed and the island submerged and remained under water for several centuries. It was not until the early 18th century, when the Caspian Sea receded, that the structure resurfaced. At this time, stones recovered from the site with inscriptions on them provided valuable information for historians.

According to Azerbaijani historian Sara Ashurbeyli, Sabayil is the castle mentioned by Abdurrashid Al-Bakuvi, a 15th-century geographer who alleged that the structure was destroyed during the 13th-century Mongol invasion.

Al-Bakuvi, a native of Baku, wrote in 1430 in his "Kitab-talkhis el-asar ve el-melik el-gahhar": "Baku has two castles; very strong, built of stone. One of them is very large and on the shore Maiden's Tower. This is the castle that the Mongols could not conquer. The other is further offshore. Its upper parts have been destroyed."

== Architecture ==
The building complex, which is 40 metres (130 ft) long and 180 metres (590 ft) wide, consists of 15 semi-circular castles, 16 to 28 metres (52 to 92 ft) apart and connected by a wall. One of the castles at the four corners – the northern one – stood alone, but the others were connected via small cells. The wall was between 1.2 and 1.5 metres (3.9 and 4.9 ft) thick. On the wall there were individual stone panels with frieze inscriptions 70 centimetres (28 in) long, 25 to 50 centimetres (10 to 20 in) wide and 12 to 15 centimetres (5 to 6 in) thick).

In 2008 an old underpass, dated back to the 19th century, was rediscovered in the Walled City of Baku. According to scholar Vitaly Antonov, this passage is one of the several, leading to the ancient Sabayil Castle. There are several tunnels leading from the Palace of Shirvanshahs and Synykh Gala, situated in Icheri Shekher, to the sea. Synykh Gala was the mosque in the 15th century, in the times of the Shah Ismail Khatai, and was destroyed by the troops of Peter I. That is, the discovered passage is part of the underground network connecting the city of Sabayil to the land.

== Relics ==
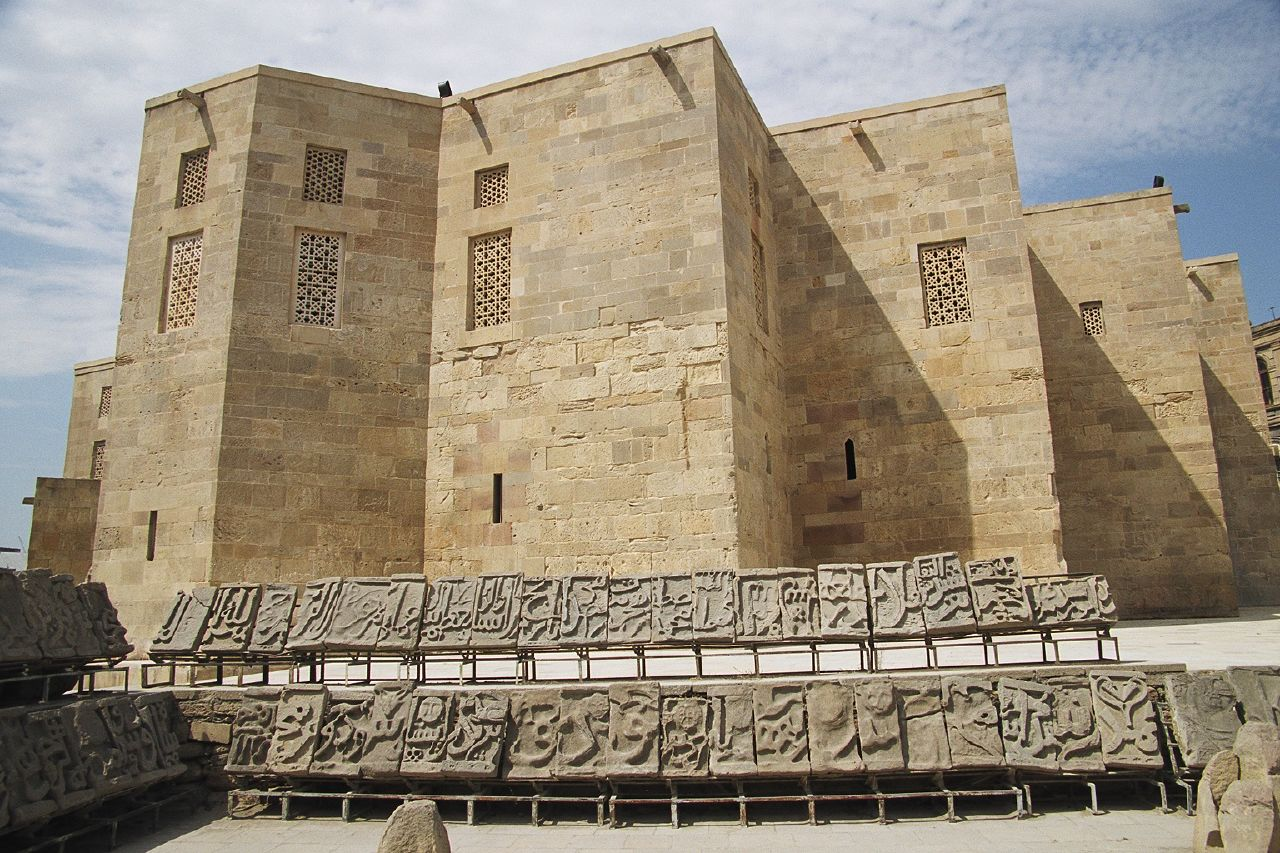
The Sabayil stone panels in the courtyard of the Palace of the Shirvanshahs

From 1939 to 1969, an archaeological expedition organized by the Institute of History of the Azerbaijani Academy of Sciences, led by Prof Y. Pakhomov and archaeologists I. Jafarzade and O. Isimzade, discovered relics and, at different times, more than 700 inscribed stone panels. They helped very much to clarify the purpose and the date of building of Bayil Castle. The stones are currently kept in the courtyard of the Shirvanshahs Palace in the Walled City of Baku. They are decorated with frieze inscriptions in Arabic and Persian, chain-shaped ornamentation and images of people, animals, birds and mythical animals.

These artworks are valuable in the study of the culture of the Shirvanshah period. However, time and the elements have affected many of them. Up to 30 percent of the stones recovered from the sea had been damaged by the centuries-long work of the waves and their inscriptions and images had been effaced. And not all of the stones have been recovered.

Historians found the names of 15 Shirvanshahs and other valuable information on these stone slabs.

== Legacy ==
Arif Ardebili, a poet of the Middle Ages, noted in his well-known dastan (epic poem) "Farkhad-name" the view he had seen:

There is a fortress in the sea near Baku,

This new fortress went down in flood.

The poet was most likely referring to the Bayil Castle. He saw Bayil Castle nearly a century after it was built. So, for him and his contemporaries the castle was still "new".
