= Alibaba Mammadov =

Azerbaijani singer and composer (1929–2022)

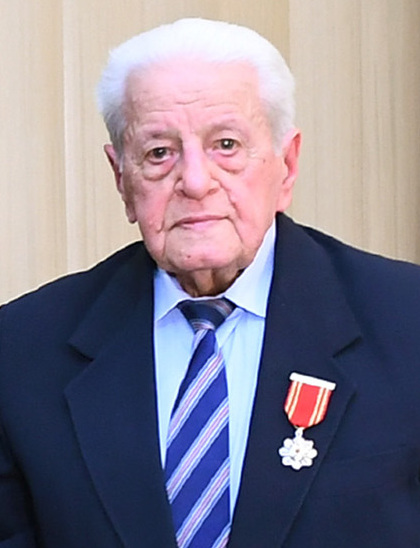
- Mammadov in 2020
- Born: Alibaba Balaahmed oğlu Mammadov; 5 February 1929; Maştağa, Azerbaijani SSR, Soviet Union
- Died: 25 February 2022 (aged 93); Baku, Azerbaijan
- Occupations: Singer; Composer

Alibaba Balaahmed oğlu Mammadov (Azerbaijani: Əlibaba Balaəhməd oğlu Məmmədov; 5 February 1929 – 25 February 2022) was an Azerbaijani singer and composer of mugham music.

== Biography ==
Mammadov was born in Maştağa, in a musical environment. He attended the Azerbaijani State Music School and attended the classes of Seyid Shushinski. In 1945, he joined the Azerbaijan State Academic Philharmonic Hall.

From 1978 to 1988, he was part of the "Azkonsert birliyi", which previously included artists such as Bulbul, Khan Shushinski, Shovkat Alakbarova, Sara Gadimova, Haji Mammadov, and others. He became director of the "Humayun" Folk Instrumental Ensemble at the Azerbaijan State Academic Philharmonic Hall.

Several of Mammadov's songs are kept in the AzTV archive. He became a mugham professor at the Baku Musical College in 1963, training prominent Azerbaijani singers and paving the way for the modern-day art of mugham.

Mammadov died in Baku on 25 February 2022, at the age of 93.
