= Nahide Babashli =

Azerbaijani-Turkish singer (born 1996)

- Born: September 24, 1996 (age 29); Baku, Azerbaijan
- Education: Baku State University
- Musical career
- Genres: Pop
- Instrument: Vocals

Nahide Babashli (Azerbaijani: Nahidə Babaşlı, born September 24, 1996) is an Azerbaijani singer, lyricist and internet celebrity. She is the recipient of the Pantene Golden Butterfly, Azerbaijan's shining young star award.

She became famous in Azerbaijan and Turkey after sharing her songs on the internet which received virtual likes and supportive comments. In 2018, Babashli posted a video of herself on YouTube, singing a song titled My Side of the Moon, originally written by the late Murat Göğebakan.

== Life ==
Babaşlı was born on September 22, 1996, in Baku, Azerbaijan, into a family with 3 children.

To obtain higher education, she enrolled in the Physics department of the Baku State University. It was during this time that she decided to become a musician, however she was initially unsuccessful. She explained to a reporter:

"During my first year of university studies, my Azerbaijani language teacher Mr. Anar told me I have a beautiful voice. He introduced me to the head of the assembly hall, Mr. Bayram, and told him to take me under his supervision and to let me perform on stage. Mr. Bayram took me into his choir, however I did not find the experience to be helpful. He then wanted to sign me up to be a mugham singer, however I did not enjoy mugham either. I left the choir a month later, and tried to focus my university studies, which were not going well"

With the help of her father, she later began performing her music on broadcasts. She frequently practices singing and reportedly aspires to represent Azerbaijan in international musical competitions.
