= Sheila Ward =

British police officer (1936–2019)

Sheila Ward (1936–2019) was a British police officer and the first female officer in the Metropolitan Police in London to hold the post of station inspector, commanding a police station in Kings Cross. She was appointed following the disbandment of the separate Women's Branch and the integration of women into the general force in 1973. She ended her career as a chief superintendent in command of the Community Relations Branch. Ward was also a self-defence instructor.
