= Shelah =

Shelah may refer to:

- Shelah (son of Judah), a son of Judah according to the Bible
- Shelah (name), a Hebrew personal name
- Shlach, the 37th weekly Torah portion (parshah) in the annual Jewish cycle of Torah reading
- Salih, a prophet described in the Qur'an whom some scholars believe to be the Islamic counterpart of Shelah son of Judah
- Salah, sometimes referred to by the name "Shelah", a minor Biblical figure (son of Arpachshad, father of Eber)
- Pool of Siloam, also referred to as the "pool of Shelah", a site of Biblical significance in Jerusalem
- Shenei Luhot HaBerit, Hebrew initialed "Shelah", 16th-century Rabbi Isaiah Horowitz most influential work
- Ofer Shelah (born 1960), Israeli politician
- Saharon Shelah (born 1945), a contemporary mathematician working in set theory and logic
- Original name of Shadmot Mehola, a West Bank Israeli settlement

== See also ==
- Shela (disambiguation)
- Shelagh
- Sela (disambiguation)
