= Shelia Goss =

American novelist

- Born: Shelia Marie Goss; September 16, 1968 (age 57); Shreveport, Louisiana, U.S.
- Education: Southern University (BS)
- Occupations: Author; freelance writer; screenwriter
- Website: sheliagoss.com

Shelia Marie Goss (born September 16, 1968) is an American author, freelance writer, and screenwriter.

Shelia Goss was born in Shreveport, Louisiana and grew up with two brothers. Her parents expressed the importance of education, so after four years at Southern University in Baton Rouge, LA she received a Bachelor of Science in Engineering in 1990. She went on to work in corporate America prior to pursuing a career as a writer.

Goss is author of Black Expressions and Essence for My Invisible Husband and Roses are Thorns, Violets are True. She has been listed in the book "Literary Divas: The Top 100+ Most Admired African-American Women in Literature." In addition to writing fiction, Goss is the managing editor and a writer for E-Spire Entertainment News. In February 2008, Goss released her fourth novel, Double Platinum.

== Literary honors ==
- 2009 EDC Creations Top Books Award - His Invisible Wife
- 2009 Amazon Best seller - His Invisible Wife, The Ultimate Test, & Splitsville
- 2008 BlackWebAwards.com - Best Female Author Site
- Disilgoldsoul 2007 YOUnity Guild Award - Most Outstanding Book Debut Promotions- "Paige’s Web"
- Infini's Outstanding Author 2006
- Literary Divas: The Top 100+ Most Admired African-American Women in Literature
- ESSENCE MAGAZINE Bestsellers List
- #1 Black Expressions.com Bestseller
- Honorable mention in a New York Times article & Writer's Digest article
- 2004 OneSwan Productions Female Author of the Year
- Three Shades of Romance Magazine Reader's Choice Awards
- Dallas Morning News Bestseller
