= Niyameddin Musayev =

Azerbaijani singer

Niyameddin Musayev (Azerbaijani: Niyaməddin Cabbar oğlu Musayev, born June 1, 1940) is an Azerbaijani singer and composer.

He was born in the Imishli District, Azerbaijan SSR.

He was among the first ones who started arranging Azerbaijani folk music in pop style and using electromusical instruments, organizing the vocal/instrumental ensemble "Röya" (Russian: Ройя; means "dream") (1978), and is credited for the foundation of the national pop music genre in Azerbaijan.

Being married once, from this marriage he has two daughters, Röya and Günel, and son Orxan.

== Awards ==
- 2020: Emek Order (Order of Labor) of II degree
- 2000: Shohrat Order (Order of Glory)
- 1998: People's Artiste of Azerbaijan
