= Sheila Elizabeth Whitton =

Canadian coder (1922–2017)

- Born: Sheila Elizabeth Hiller; October 25, 1922; Toronto, Canada
- Died: November 26, 2017 (aged 95); Collingwood, Canada
- Spouse(s): Robert "Bob" Flemming – 1944 (killed in action); John Leduc Whitton 1950 – 2012 (his death)

Sheila Elizabeth Whitton (née Hiller) (October 25, 1922 – November 26, 2017) was a Canadian coder with the Women's Royal Canadian Naval Service, colloquially known as the WRENS, during WWII. She was one of a small group of Canadian coders sent to the UK to prepare for D-Day.

== Service in WWII ==
Sheila Hiller graduated from Havergal College, Toronto, and joined the navy in 1943. She was first assigned to Halifax, where she began her coder training. Coders were first trained with books: “Great heavy coding books, which would have 4 letter insignia for a word.” In April 1944, Sheila was transferred to London with five other WRENS. In London they worked with civilian coders progressing from books to “coding machines.”

In her words:

"We didn’t know at the time about those coding machines. it really was the size and shape of a fairly large typewriter, but they had cylinders. You had a set up each day for how to start each one, how you placed them in your machine. That code would change every day, so you’d have to make sure you would be able to break the message for the day"

The women worked in 3 shifts to cover the 24 hours of the day. She remained working as a coder in England until the end of the war. According to the CFB Esquimalt Naval & Military Museum, "Just one year after the WRCNS was established, the Wrens were already earning high praise" including from Vice Admiral Percy W. Nelles, Chief of Naval Staff, who stated,

"I wish to thank the patriotic women who have entered their country’s service and have added so capably to the combat strength of the navy by helping to man the shore establishments in this country. In one short year you have proved yourselves of immeasurable value to the naval service by taking over many tasks with skill, diligence and cheerfulness. As Chief of Naval Staff, I am proud of your record and the contribution you are making to the final victory."

== After WWII ==
On her return to Canada she attended The University of Toronto and became a social worker. She served on the national board of the Canadian Save the Children Fund, and was chair in the mid-1960s. In the 1980s, she taught part-time at Sheridan College, Oakville.

== Personal life ==
Sheila's longtime boyfriend Robert ("Bob") Fleming, an officer in The Queens Own Rifles was already in the U.K. Just after she arrived in London, April 1944, and having been apart for 2 years, they decided to marry. Sheila received permission to travel to Bob's location, where they were married by his regiment's Padre. Up until D-Day the newlywed couple were able to write to each other but then mail was stopped. The last letter Sheila received from Bob was from Normandy after he had been killed in action. After VE Day (Victory in Europe Day, May 8^{th,} 1945) Sheila journeyed to France to visit the Canadian Cemetery at Bény-sur-mer, Normandy.

In 1950 she married fellow Canadian John Whitton. John and Sheila were married for 62 years (until his death) and had four children.
