= Paramjit Singh (artist) =

Indian artist (born 1935)

Paramjit Singh (born 1935) is an Indian artist. He was born in Amritsar, India. Currently he lives in New Delhi, India. Singh was married to fellow painter Arpita Singh, with whom he had a daughter, the artist Anjum Singh.

He earned his bachelor's degree and PhD in fine arts from Delhi Polytechnic in 1958 and 1962, respectively. For nearly three decades Singh was a professor in the department of fine arts at Jamia Millia Islamia in New Delhi.

The Seventh Walk (2013), an experimental documentary film by Indian filmmaker Amit Dutta is about the charcoal drawings of Singh.
