= Síle =

Síle is a feminine Irish language given name, from which the anglicised form Sheila is derived.

== People ==
- Síle de Valera, former Fianna Fáil politician, born 1954
- Síle Seoige, Irish television presenter, born 1979
- Síle Ní Bhraonain, Irish television presenter, born 1983
- Síle Nic Chormaic, Irish physicist, professor in Japan
- Síle Burns, sportsperson

== See also ==
- List of Irish-language given names
- Sheila
