= Akif Islamzade =

Azerbaijani singer (born 1948)

- Born: August 8, 1948 (age 77); Baku, Azerbaijani SSR, USSR
- Genres: Pop
- Occupation: singer
- Instrument: Voice
- Years active: 1972–1986
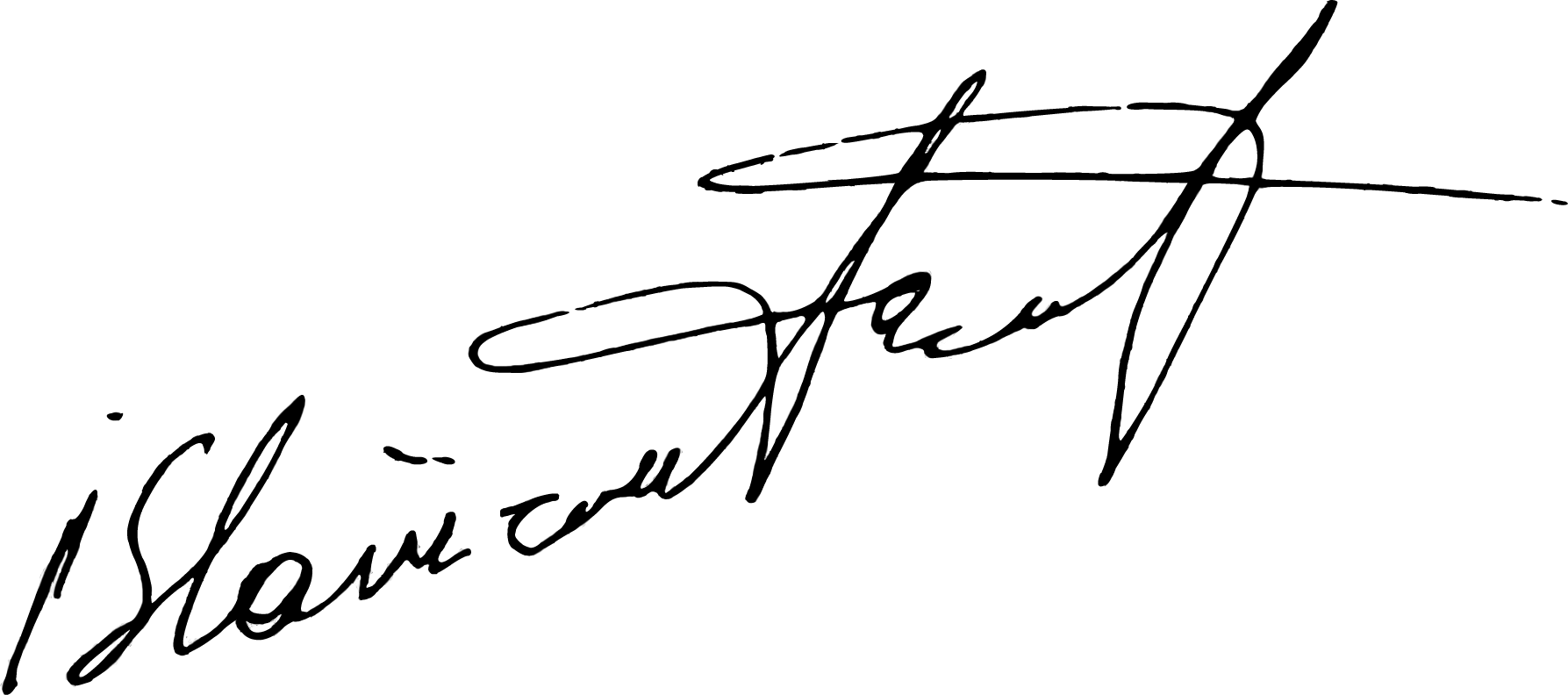

Akif Islamzade (Azerbaijani: Akif İslamzadə, born August 8, 1948) is an Azerbaijani singer.

== Biography ==
Islamzade was born on 8 August 1948 in Baku to mugham singer Sara Gadimova. He graduated from Azerbaijan State Economic University in 1979. In 1972, he started as a vocalist at Rashid Behbudov State Song Theatre. In 1976, he participated as a vocalist in Tofig Ahmadov's state orchestra. In 1986, he stopped his musical activities due loss of voice. After that, he retired from recording full-length albums. The problem of his voice got worse, and affected not only his ability to sing, but also to speak.
