= Sheila Makhijani =

Indian artist (born 1962)

- Born: 1962 (age 63–64)
- Occupation: Indian artist

Sheila Makhijani (born 1962) is a New Delhi-based artist.

== Life and career ==
Born in New Delhi, Makhijani attended College of Art, Delhi, where she completed a master's degree in Arts degree. In 1993, she studied at Kanazawa Bijutsu Kogei Daigaku, or Kanazawa College of Art, in Kanazawa, Japan, and she has since participated in a number of workshops and art festivals, including the Khoj International Artists Workshop in both 1998 and 2001, and the 7th Asia Pacific Triennial, in 2012. Her works have been exhibited internationally in the Netherlands, India, and Australia, including at Museum of Modern Art (MoMA) in New York, Queensland Art Gallery in Brisbane, Australia, Perth Institute of Contemporary Arts in Perth, Australia, and Talwar Gallery, which currently represents the artist, in New York and in New Delhi. Her art can also be found in the permanent collections of the Metropolitan Museum of Art, the Stedelijk Museum, and the Kiran Nadar Museum of Art.

Makhijani currently lives and works in New Delhi.

== Work ==
Makhijani's work spans a variety of media. Although her drawings have been said to be her "primary engagement," she has works regularly in a range of materials, including painting, gouache, mixed-media, collage, and sculpture. Makhijani's artistic practice, in fact, blurs the lines between media; she seems to carve space onto her canvases and within her paintings, which result from a process of accretion and erasure, while her sculptures often read as three-dimensional drawings. The inclusion of Makhijani's piece "Take a leap" in the Museum of Modern Art (MoMA)'s 2010 exhibition, On Line: Drawing Through the Twentieth Century, calls attention to this intermingling of dimensions in Makhijani's oeuvre; the work, which is a kind of collage of drawings on paper, stitched together with thread, concretises the act and the space of drawing. Her paintings and gouaches, often vividly coloured, feature webs of undulating, interweaving lines that both question and transgress the very boundaries they create. Although almost exclusively non-figurative, Makhijani's works possess an energy and movement that seem to pulsate with life; her lines have been called “moving spirits refusing to be tied down,” forms that “take on a life of their own,” full of “untrammeled glee.”
