= Shelah (name) =

Hebrew personal name

Shelah is a Latin transcription of several separate Hebrew names.

In Biblical Hebrew, it may represent שֵׁלָה ("Shelah" or "Shela") or שֶׁלַח ("Salah", "Shelah" or "Shela"). A later Hebrew name that has been rendered as "Shela" is שילא, as exemplified by the early third-century Babylonian rabbi Rav Shela, which may be identical with שֵׁלָה.

"Shelah" has also served as a pseudonym in the form of "Shelah haKadosh", referring to Isaiah Horowitz, a 16th-century Jewish mystic. In this case, the given name "Shelah" (של"ה) is an acronym created from the initial letters of the Hebrew title of Horowitz' most influential work, Shenei Luhot HaBerit (שני לוחות הברית).

In modern times, "Shelah" (שֶׁלַח) has become a surname, as exemplified by Saharon Shelah (b. 1945 Jerusalem).
