= Ogtay Aghayev =

Soviet-Azerbaijani singer (1934–2006)

- Born: November 7, 1934; Baku, Azerbaijan SSR, Transcaucasian SFSR, Soviet Union
- Origin: Azerbaijani
- Died: November 13, 2006 (aged 72) Baku, Azerbaijan
- Occupations: Singer, actor

Ogtay Jafar oghlu Aghayev (Azerbaijani: Oqtay Cəfər oğlu Ağayev, Russian: Октай Джафар оглы Агаев; November 7, 1934 – November 13, 2006) was a Soviet, Azerbaijani variety singer and People's Artist of Azerbaijan.

== Biography ==
Ogtay Aghayev was born in 1934 in Baku. In 1953, he entered Asaf Zeynally Music School in Baku. After returning from military service, he continued his education in the class of Firudin Mehdiyev. By 1958, he began to perform in Gaya Quartet. Later he became a soloist at Azerbaijan State Estrada Orchestra led by Rauf Hajiyev until 1970. Until 1984 he worked as soloist at Radio and Television Estrada Orchestra led by Tofig Ehmedov. In 1962, he performed at the State Kremlin Palace with this orchestra. Ogtay Aghayev also performed in tours in countries such as Algeria, Morocco, Poland, Czechoslovakia, Bulgaria, Romania and also in all republics of the former USSR.

He performed songs to films such as Find that girl, Struggle in the mountains, Bread to be shared, etc. Besides that, he also was shot as Melik Babanov – head of the NKVD - in Japan and Japanese film by Vagif Mustafayev. Ogtay Aghayev was also a laureate of the Humay Award.

Suffering from cardiovascular disease Ogtay Aghayev died in Baku on November 14, 2006.

== Filmography ==
1. Abşeron ritmləri (Absheron rhythms)
2. Bakı bağları. Buzovna (film, 2007)(Baku Gardens)
3. Dağlarda döyüş (film, 1967)(Battle in the mountains)
4. Xatirələr sahili (film, 1972)(Coast of memories)
5. Konsert proqramı (film, 1971) (I)(Concert program)
6. Mahnı qanadlarında (film, 1973)(On the wings of song)
7. O qızı tapın (film, 1970)(Find that girl)
8. Oqtay Ağayev. Ötən günlər (film, 2004)(Ogtay Agayev. Past Days)
9. Şərikli çörək (film, 1969)(Shared Bread)
10. Toyda görüş (film, 1970)(Meeting in the wedding)
11. "Yapon" və yaponiyalı (film, 1990)
