= Rav Shela =

3rd century Babylonian Talmud rabbi

Shela (Hebrew: רבי שילא) was a Babylonian teacher of the latter part of the tannaitic and the beginning of the amoraic period, and head of the school ("sidra") at Nehardea. When Rav visited Babylonia, he once officiated as an expounder (amora) for R. Shela at his public lectures. The school at Nehardea was named in honor of Shela; and its scholars were accordingly known as "D'Bei R. Shela."

With the exception of a mishnaic interpretation, none of Shela's teachings is known, although some of the sayings of the students of his academy, the Bei R. Shela, are mentioned in the Talmud.
