= Shovkat Alakbarova =

Azerbaijani singer (1922–1993)

- Born: 20 October 1922; Baku, Azerbaijan
- Died: 7 February 1993 (aged 70) Baku, Azerbaijan
- Genres: Classical
- Years active: 1937–1992

Shovkat Feyzulla qizi Alakbarova (Azerbaijani: Şövkət Ələkbərova) (20 October 1922 in Baku – 7 February 1993 in Baku) was an Azerbaijani singer.

== Life and career development ==
Shovkat Alakbarova was born to Azerbaijani parents - Feyzulla and Hokuma Alakbarov, and was the third of the family's four children. Her mother was a professional tar player and her father, a labourer, was a folk music lover. Both parents passed similar interests on to their children. As a child, Shovkat took up kamancha lessons. In 1937, she became one of the finalists at a contest held among amateur singers and judged by prominent Azerbaijani composers and musicians, such as Uzeyir Hajibeyov and Bulbul. She performed Qarabagh shikastasi at the Azerbaijan State Opera and Ballet Theatre in Baku (which was her first stage performance) and was chosen by Hajibeyov to join the newly formed Azerbaijan State Choir, where Alakbarova started her professional career as a singer. As a teenager, she was vocally trained by mugham instructor Aghalar Aliverdibeyov and opera singer Huseyngulu Sarabski. At the early stage of her career, she mostly performed folk songs.

During the Second World War while giving concerts to soldiers in hospitals, train stations, military units, Alakbarova first sang patriotic war songs composed by Hajibeyov. She would make up to 50 performances a day, including those in distant places such as Stalingrad and Ukraine. Beginning in 1945, she worked with the Azerbaijan State Philharmonic Society. By the 1950s, she was recognized as the most popular Azerbaijani singer of both folk and composed songs. Most of Alakbarova's songs were in Azeri, however she also sang in Persian, Arabic, and Turkish. She toured over 20 countries in Europe, Asia and Africa. Three years before her death, in 1990, she went to Germany to receive medical treatment and at the same time to perform for the Azeri émigrés.

== Family and death ==
Alakbarova has been married twice. She gave birth to her daughter Natella. After her husband went away to the front as a doctor, he married again. In 1955, she married film director Latif Safarov and gave birth to her son Bashir. Her husband committed suicide. After that, she devoted herself to her children and to her career. In 1992 her daughter Natella died, and it affected Alakbarova's health, and she died a year after, at the age of 70.

== Discography ==
- Axşam (Qaş qaralır)
- Ayrılıq
- Aldatmayaq bir-birimizi
- Ay Qız
- Ağlaya-ağlaya
- Bir könül sındırmışam
- Bakı
- Dərələr
- Gəl səhərim
- Gedək üzü küləyə
- Oxu gözəl
- Neylərəm (İmaməddin Nəsimi / Süleyman Ələsgərov)
- Sən mənim, mən sənin
- Sənsən ürəyim
- Səslərəm səni
- Kəsmə şikəstə
- Küsüb məndən
- Lay-lay
- İnanmıram
- Təkcə ümid qalsın
- Tez gəl
- Töhfə
- Mirzə-hüseyn segahı
- Məhəbbət
- Ola bilməz
- Vağzalı çalınır.
- Fizuli Kantatası
- Yavaş-yavaş
- Hardasan
