= Alpout =

Alpout or Alpaut or Alpaud or Alpouç may refer to:

- Alpout, Barda, Azerbaijan
- Alpout, Bilasuvar, Azerbaijan
- Alpout, Goranboy, Azerbaijan
- Alpout, Goychay, Azerbaijan
- Alpout, Lachin, Azerbaijan
- Alpout, Qazakh, Azerbaijan
- Alpout, Ujar, Azerbaijan
- Alpout Pervyy, Azerbaijan
