= Firudin Shamoyev =

- Born: February 7, 1962; Qazakh District, Azerbaijan
- Died: April 13, 1992 (aged 30); Qazakh District, Azerbaijan
- Military career
- Allegiance: Azerbaijan
- Service years: 1991–1992
- Conflicts: First Nagorno-Karabakh War
- Awards: National Hero of Azerbaijan; 1992

Firudin Shamoyev (Azerbaijani: Firudin Şamoyev) (February 7, 1962 in Qazakh District, Azerbaijan – April 13, 1992 in Qazakh District, Azerbaijan) was the National Hero of Azerbaijan, and the warrior of the Karabakh war.

== Biography ==
Firudin Shamoyev was born on 7 February 1962 to a Kurdish family in the Qazakh District of Azerbaijan. He graduated from secondary school in Qazakh District. He was called up for military service in 1981 and completed his military service in 1983.

== Military service ==
Firudin Shamoyev took part in the defense of Bağanis Ayrum, Məzəm and Quşçu Ayrım villages of the Qazakh District. He destroyed many Armenian forces and armored vehicles. Firudin was killed in the battles around the village of Quşçu Ayrım on 13 April 1992.

== Memorial ==
He was posthumously awarded the title of "National Hero of Azerbaijan" by Presidential Decree No. 833 dated 7 June 1992. He was buried in the Martyrs' Lane in Qazakh District.

== See also ==
- First Nagorno-Karabakh War
- List of National Heroes of Azerbaijan

== Sources ==
- Vugar Asgarov. Azərbaycanın Milli Qəhrəmanları (Yenidən işlənmiş II nəşr). Bakı: "Dərələyəz-M", 2010, səh. 268.
