= List of national border changes (1914–present) =

Since World War I, there have been many changes in borders between nations, detailed below. For information on border changes from the end of the Napoleonic Wars to 1914, see the list of national border changes (1815–1914). Cases are only listed where there have been changes in borders, not necessarily including changes in ownership of a territory. For instance, many European colonies in Africa became independent without any adjustment to their borders, although some did have many changes. Also mentioned are some de facto changes, not recognized by the international community, such as Crimea, and South Ossetia.

Over 50% of the world's borders today were drawn as a result of British and French imperialism. The British and French drew the modern borders of the Middle East, the borders of Africa, and in Asia after the independence of the British Raj and French Indochina and the borders of Europe after World War I as victors, as a result of the Paris treaties. As a result of New Imperialism, the European countries with the most colonies throughout history were: the United Kingdom (115), France (53), Portugal (52), Spain (44), the Netherlands (29), Germany (20), Russia (17), Denmark (9), Sweden (8), Italy (7), Norway (6), Belgium (3) and Greece (1).

== Africa ==
- 1919–1922 — The Treaty of Versailles divides Germany's African colonies into mandates of the victors (which largely become new colonies of the victors). Most of Cameroon becomes a French mandate with a small portion taken by the British and some territory incorporated into France's previously existing colonies; Togo is mostly taken by the British, though the French gain a slim portion; German East Africa was separated between Belgium (Rwanda and Burundi), Portugal (the Kionga Triangle) and the United Kingdom (Tanganyika, later merging with Zanzibar to form Tanzania); and German South-West Africa (Namibia) becomes a mandate of South Africa. In September, France settles its African colonial borders with Italian Libya. On September 8, following the signing of the Anglo-French Convention of September 8, 1919, the borders of Italian Libya and French Chad are settled to the present-day boundaries. A few days later, the borders of western and southwestern Libya are extended to their current boundaries after French concessions with the Franco-Italian Arrangement of 12 September 1919.
- 1924 June 15 — The UK cedes a portion of Jubaland to Italy (Trans-Juba, it. Oltregiuba) as a reward for the Italians having joined the Allies in World War I.
  Italian East Africa was formed in 1936 through the merger of Italian Somalia, Italian Eritrea, and the newly occupied Ethiopian Empire, conquered in the Second Italo-Ethiopian War.
- 1925 May 15 — The Tangier International Zone is established after France and Spain end their control over parts of the city.
- 1925 — The eastern borders of Libya and British Egypt are changed to their present boundaries, with the exception of parts of present-day southern Libya still remaining part of British Sudan.
- 1931 — France moves the control of the area of the present day Borkou-Ennedi-Tibesti Prefecture from the territory of Niger in French West Africa to Chad in French Equatorial Africa.
- 1934 — The borders of Libya are changed to their present-day boundaries after the Italo-British-Egyptian Agreement, British Sudan cedes northern territory to Libya.
- 1935 — The Franco-Italian Agreement cedes the Aouzou Strip from French Chad to Italian Libya.
- 1936 — After the success of Italy during the Second Italo-Abyssinian War, Ethiopia is annexed by Italy. Ethiopia joins with Eritrea and Italian Somaliland to form Italian East Africa. The international community does not accept Italy's occupation of Ethiopia and maintains relations with exiled Ethiopian Emperor Haile Selassie.
- 1940 – 1943 — With the outbreak of World War II, war arrives in Africa in 1940, with Italy joining the war, initially British forces in British Somaliland are defeated by the Italians coming from Italian East Africa and the territory is taken. However, by 1941, the British retake lost territory and take over Italian East Africa. In North Africa, after a period of retreat into Libya, Italian forces receive vital aid from the German army and the Germans move deep into Egypt by 1942, before beginning to lose ground. By 1943, The German and Italian forces retreat from Libya and capture Tunisia from France prior to fleeing to Sicily.
- 1948 January 12 — The Prince Edward Islands are annexed by the Union of South Africa.
- 1951 December 24 — The Kingdom of Libya becomes independent.
- 1952 September 11 — British-administered Eritrea is joined into a federation with Ethiopia.

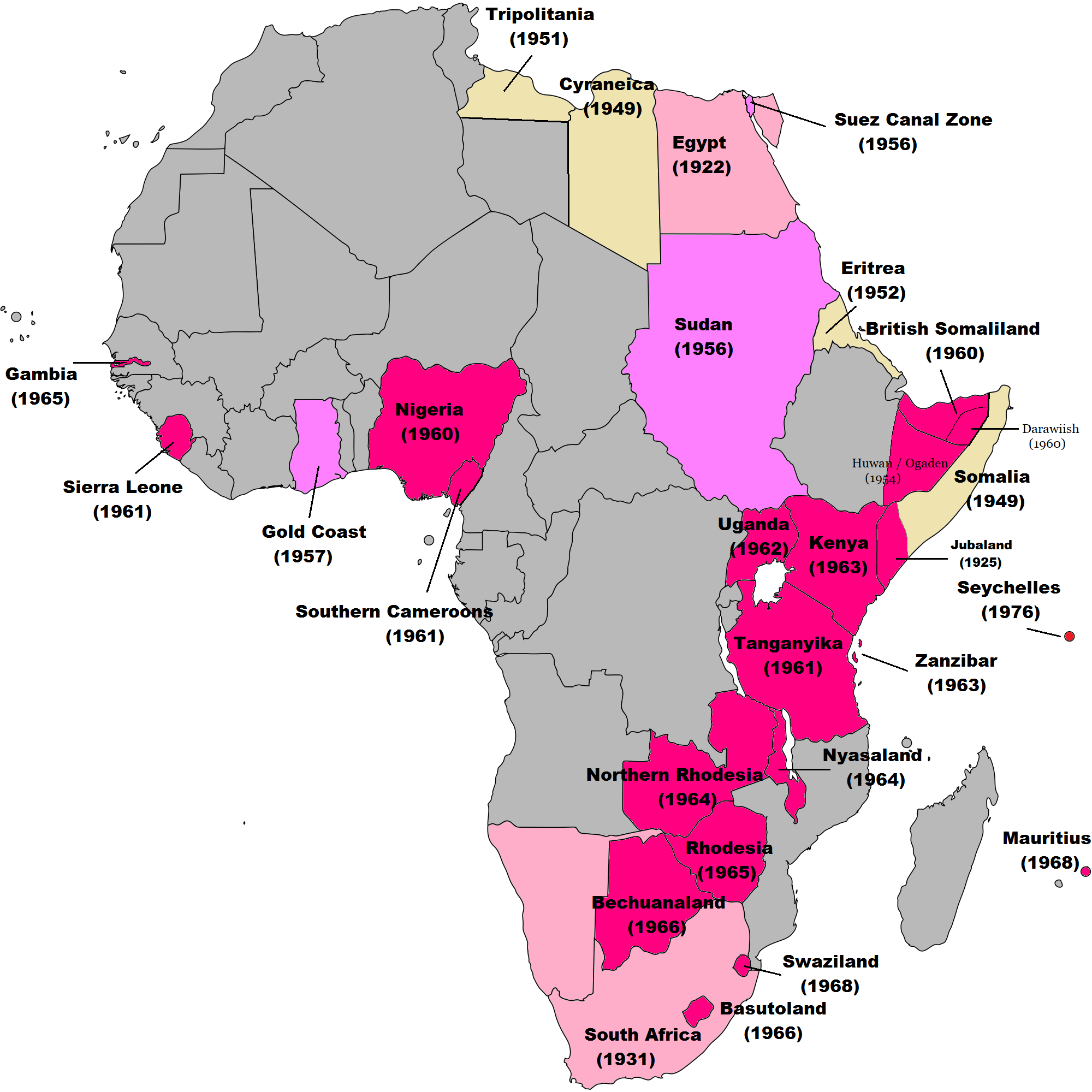
British decolonization in Africa.

- 1953 August 1 — Federation of Rhodesia and Nyasaland established from the British self-governing colony of Southern Rhodesia and the British protectorates of Northern Rhodesia, and Nyasaland.
- 1956 January 1 — Sudan gains independence.
- 1956 March 20 — Tunisia gains independence.
- 1956 April 7 — French Morocco, the International Zone of Tangier, and the northern zone of Spanish Morocco join to become the independent nation of Morocco.
- 1957 March 6 — The United Kingdom annexes British Togoland and the Northern Territories protectorate as part of Her Majesty's dominions in Ghana, a new independent country within the British Commonwealth.
- 1958 — French West Africa splits into Mauritania, Senegal, French Sudan (now Mali), French Guinea (now Guinea), Côte d'Ivoire, Niger, Upper Volta (now Burkina Faso) and Dahomey (now Benin)
- 1 April 1958 — With the Treaty of Angra de Cintra, Spain relinquishes its protectorate in the Southern Zone (Cape Juby) of Spanish Morocco, which joins the independent nation of Morocco. Much (though not all) of the area of the Territory of Ifni is effectively ceded by Spain as well.
- 1960 — Belgian Congo is granted independence as the Republic of the Congo. In 1964 it changes its name to the Democratic Republic of the Congo to differentiate itself from Congo-Brazzaville.
- 1960 July 1 — State of Somaliland (formerly British Somaliland) joins with Italian Somaliland to form Somalia. French Equatorial Africa's interim successor, the Union of Central African Republics dissolves in August with independence of Chad (August 11), Oubangui-Chari (now Central African Republic) (August 13), Congo-Brazzaville (now the Republic of the Congo) (August 15), and Gabon (August 17).
- 1961 May 31 — the northern two-thirds of British Cameroons joins Nigeria; October 1 — the southern third of British Cameroons joins with the Republic of Cameroon to form the Federal Republic of Cameroon. This year also the tiny Portuguese outpost of São João Baptista de Ajudá was annexed by Dahomey (now Benin)
- 1962 July 1 — The Belgian colony of Ruanda-Urundi separated into Rwanda and Burundi.
- 1962 September 25 — The People's Democratic Republic of Algeria is formally officially regained its sovereignty.
- 1963 December 31 — Federation of Rhodesia and Nyasaland dissolved; over the next two years Nyasaland becomes independent Malawi, Northern Rhodesia wins independence as Zambia, and Southern Rhodesia (or simply Rhodesia) unilaterally declares independence.
  Mauritania and Morocco agreed to divide Western Sahara among themselves in 1975. Mauritania relinquished its claim in 1979.
- 1964 April 26 — Tanganyika unites with the island of Zanzibar to form Tanzania.
- 1966 September 30 Bechuanaland becomes an independent Commonwealth republic as Botswana.
- 1966 October 4 The British colony of Basutoland becomes an independent state of Lesotho.
- 1967 May 30 — The break-away state of Biafra is formed from southern Nigeria. Officially Biafra receives de jure acknowledgement of existence by only a few nations, but has the de facto support of France, Israel, Portugal, and South Africa which provide arms to the state in its war of independence against Nigeria.
- 1968 September 6 - Eswatini, Britain's last African colony gains independence.
- 1969 January 4 — Spain returns Ifni to Morocco.
- 1970 January 15 — Biafra is occupied and annexed by Nigeria.
- 1973 September 24 — The Portuguese Overseas Province of Guinea declares its independence as the Republic of Guinea-Bissau. Recognition is granted the next year on 10 September 1974.
- 1975 June 25 — The Portuguese Province of Mozambique gains independence as the People's Republic of Mozambique.
- 1975 July 5 — The Portuguese Overseas Province of Cape Verde gains independence as the Republic of Cape Verde.
- 1975 July 6 — The French State of the Comoros gains independence as the State of Comoros.
- 1975 July 12 — The Portuguese Overseas Province of São Tomé and Príncipe gains independence as the Democratic Republic of São Tomé and Príncipe.
- 1975 November 11 — The Portuguese State of Angola gains independence as the People's Republic of Angola.
- 1975 December 1 — Spanish Sahara divided de facto between Morocco and Mauritania (although Spain's formal mandate did not end until February 26, 1976). Western Sahara is de jure a non-self governing territory according to the UN. No country recognised this until 2020, when the United States recognised Morocco's annexation.
- 1976 June 29 — The British Crown Colony of the Seychelles gains independence as the Republic of Seychelles.
- 1977 June 27 — The French Territory of the Afars and the Issas gains independence as the Republic of Djibouti
- 1977 September 1 — South African Government reimposed direct rule on Walvis Bay.
- 1979 — Mauritania withdraws from southern Western Sahara, which is taken over by Morocco
- 1990 — Namibia gets independence from occupying South Africa.
- 1991 May 18 — Somaliland declares independence from Somalia but is not recognized by any other country.
- 1993 May 24 — Eritrea breaks off from Ethiopia.
- 1994 February 28 — Walvis Bay and the Penguin Islands are transferred by South Africa to Namibia.
- 2008 August 14 — Bakassi transferred to Cameroon by Nigeria
- 2011 July 9 — South Sudan formally obtains independence from the Republic of Sudan.
- 2024 April 1 — Puntland announces its temporary independence from Somalia until constitutional disputes and internal issues are to be resolved. It has no other formal recognition.
- 2025 May 19 — The ICJ resolves the territorial dispute between Gabon and Equatorial Guinea, awarding the latter country the Islands of Mbanie, Cocotier, and Conga.

== Asia ==
- 1919 June 28 — The German Concession in Shandong is formally transferred to Japan as part of the Treaty of Versailles. It had been under de facto Japanese control since the 1914 Siege of Tsingtao.
- 1919 June 1 — Xu Shuzheng, Chinese warlord of the Republic of China, invades Outer Mongolia, repelling the White Army and reintegrating Mongolia into China.
- 1921 — The White Army defeat the Chinese Forces, ending the Occupation of Mongolia by the Beiyang government and re-establishing the Bogd Khanate.
- 1921 August 14 — The Tuvan People's Republic is proclaimed by revolutionaries with support from the Bolsheviks.
- 1922 February 4 — Japan agrees to transfer its lease in Shandong to China during the Washington Naval Conference, resolving the Shandong Problem.
- 1922 — The Saudi Arabian–Iraqi neutral zone is created.
- 26 November 1924 — The Mongolian People's Republic is established in the first constitution following the defeat of White Forces in the region and the end of the Russian Civil War.
- 1925 December — The Sultanate of Nejd annexes the Kingdom of Hejaz and subsequently decrees the Kingdom of Hejaz and Nejd in 1926.
- 1926 June 1 — The Treaty of Ankara is signed, recognising the Iraq-Turkey border with some minor modifications and solving the Mosul question.
  Location of Manchukuo (red) within Imperial Japan's sphere of influence
- 1928 — The ICJ awards the Island of Palmas from the Philippines to the Dutch East Indies.
- 1929 — The Soviet Union seizes the Bolshoy Ussuriysky Island from the Republic of China.
- 1932 February 18 — The Empire of Japan declares Manchukuo independent of China
- 1932 September 23 — The Kingdom of Hejaz and Nejd annexes the Idrisid Emirate of Asir and subsequently establishes the Kingdom of Saudi Arabia.
- 1936 May 12 — Japan declares Mengjiang independent of China.
- 1937 — The British split Burma and Aden off from the rest of the Raj
- 1938 — Hatay State, a city-state, is formed when it separates from French-held Syria.
- 1939 — Turkey annexes Hatay.
- World War II — In the early stages of World War II in the Pacific, Japan makes steady gains against the Allies. In 1940, with the collapse of France in Europe, the new Vichy regime allows Japan to annex French Indochina. After the attack on Pearl Harbor, Japan proceeds to occupy Wake Island, the Philippines, British Malaya, the Dutch East Indies, northern New Guinea and a number of pacific islands. Japan also begins attacks against British-held Burma and India, and creates a puppet regime in Burma. From 1943 to its defeat, Japan steadily loses territory in the Pacific to the Allies and in 1945, Japan surrenders, abolishing its remaining puppet regimes in Manchukuo and Mengjiang, and abandoning its hold on Korea.
- 1941 May 9 — After losing the Franco-Thai War, Vichy France is coerced by Japan to cede parts of French Indochina to Thailand.
- 1944 — Tuvan People's Republic becomes a part of the Soviet Union.
- 1945 — Kwantung Leased Territory is dissolved and returned to the Republic of China.
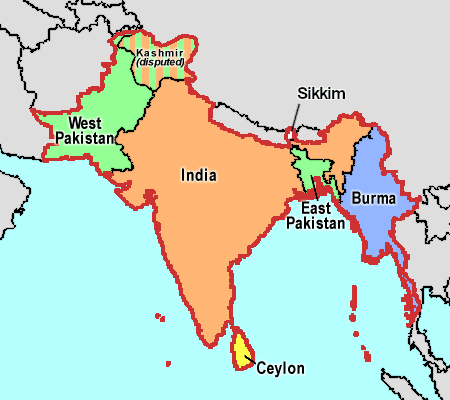
  Britain's holdings on the Indian subcontinent were granted independence in 1947 and 1948, becoming five new independent states: India, Burma, Ceylon, Sikkim, and Pakistan (including East Bengal, from 1971 Bangladesh).
- 1945 — The Republic of China have Taiwan and Penghu retroceded.
- 1945 — Following the war, the Soviet Union annexes the Southern Sakhalin and Kuril Islands from Japan according to the Yalta Conference, and Korea is divided into the countries of South Korea and North Korea.
- 1946 April 1 — Straits Settlements, Unfederated Malay States and Federated Malay States join to form the Malayan Union. (Although these could have been considered remaining part of British Malaya) Jordan becomes independent after separating from the British Mandate of Palestine. The United Kingdom hands over the administration of the Turtle Islands to the Philippines.
- 1946 November 17 — Thailand agrees to return all territory gained in 1941 to France in exchange for a membership in the United Nations.
- 1947 August 15 — The Partition of India splits India and Pakistan as independent countries from Britain.
- 1948 — The State of Israel is created after the 1947 United Nations General Assembly Resolution 181 called for the partition of the British-ruled Palestine into a Jewish state and an Arab state. The resolution is accepted by the Jews in Palestine, but rejected by the Arabs in Palestine and the Arab states.
- 1948 — After the Indo-Pakistani War of 1947–1948 over Kashmir, a Line of Control is created in Kashmir, creating Indian and Pakistani controlled zones.
- 1949 — The Republic of China loses control of most of mainland China (except for Kinmen and Matsu of Fukien/Fujian province, Tibet, Hainan) to the newly formed People's Republic of China in the Chinese Civil War
- 1949 — The Arab–Israeli War ends in an armistice, with Israel gaining 60% of the Palestinian state proposed by the 1947 partition plan, Egypt gaining the Gaza Strip and Jordan gaining the West Bank.
- 1950 — Chandannagar is taken over by India from French control.
- 1951 — Tibet is annexed by the People's Republic of China.
- 1953 — Following the Korean War, the boundary between North Korea and South Korea is defined as the Military Demarcation Line, which roughly follows the previous 38th parallel
- 1954 — Bands of Indian irregulars take over the Portuguese enclaves of Dadra and Nagar Haveli. On June 13, the port of Mahé breaks away from French rule and joins India. French Indochina dissolves, Vietnam is divided into two countries, South Vietnam and North Vietnam, and the nations of Cambodia, Laos, and Vietnam become independent states.
- 1955 — The Soviet Union hands over Dalian port to the People's Republic of China.
- 1958 December 8 — Gwadar is purchased by Pakistan from Oman.
- 1960 — Cyprus declares its independence from the United Kingdom; the Sovereign Base Areas of Akrotiri and Dhekelia are established on the island by the United Kingdom under the latter's control.
- 1961 December 19 — India takes over the Portuguese colony of Goa, Daman and Diu, which becomes a single Union Territory of India. In 1987, Goa is elevated to full statehood, with Daman and Diu remaining a Union Territory.
- 1962 August 16 — India officially absorbs the French enclaves of Puducherry.
- 1962 — The Federation of South Arabia is created.
- 1963 — The Protectorate of South Arabia is created.
- 1963 — Pakistan cedes claimed areas of Kashmir to the People's Republic of China.
- 1963 September 16 — Singapore, British North Borneo (renamed Sabah), Sarawak and Malaya join to form Malaysia.
- 1965 August 9 — Singapore withdraws from Malaysia.
- 1965 — Jordan and Saudi Arabia conclude a bilateral agreement that realigns and defines the boundary between the two.
- 1967 — The Federation of South Arabia and the Protectorate of South Arabia join to form South Yemen.
- 1967 — Following the Six-Day War, Israel gains the Sinai Peninsula and Gaza Strip from Egypt, the West Bank from Jordan and Golan Heights from Syria.
- 1969 — Western New Guinea is integrated by Indonesia following the controversial Act of Free Choice.
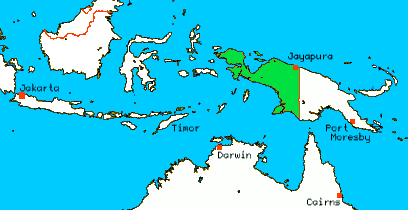
  Western New Guinea is formally annexed by Indonesia in 1969
- 1969 December 18 — Saudi Arabian–Kuwaiti neutral zone partitioned between Kuwait and Saudi Arabia.
- 1971 October 25 — The United Nations recognizes the People's Republic of China as the sole legitimate government of "China" instead of the Republic of China.
- 1971 December 16 — Bangladesh becomes independent.
- 1974 — After an attempted Greek Cypriot coup sponsored by the Greek military junta of that period, Turkey invades and occupies one-third of Cyprus.
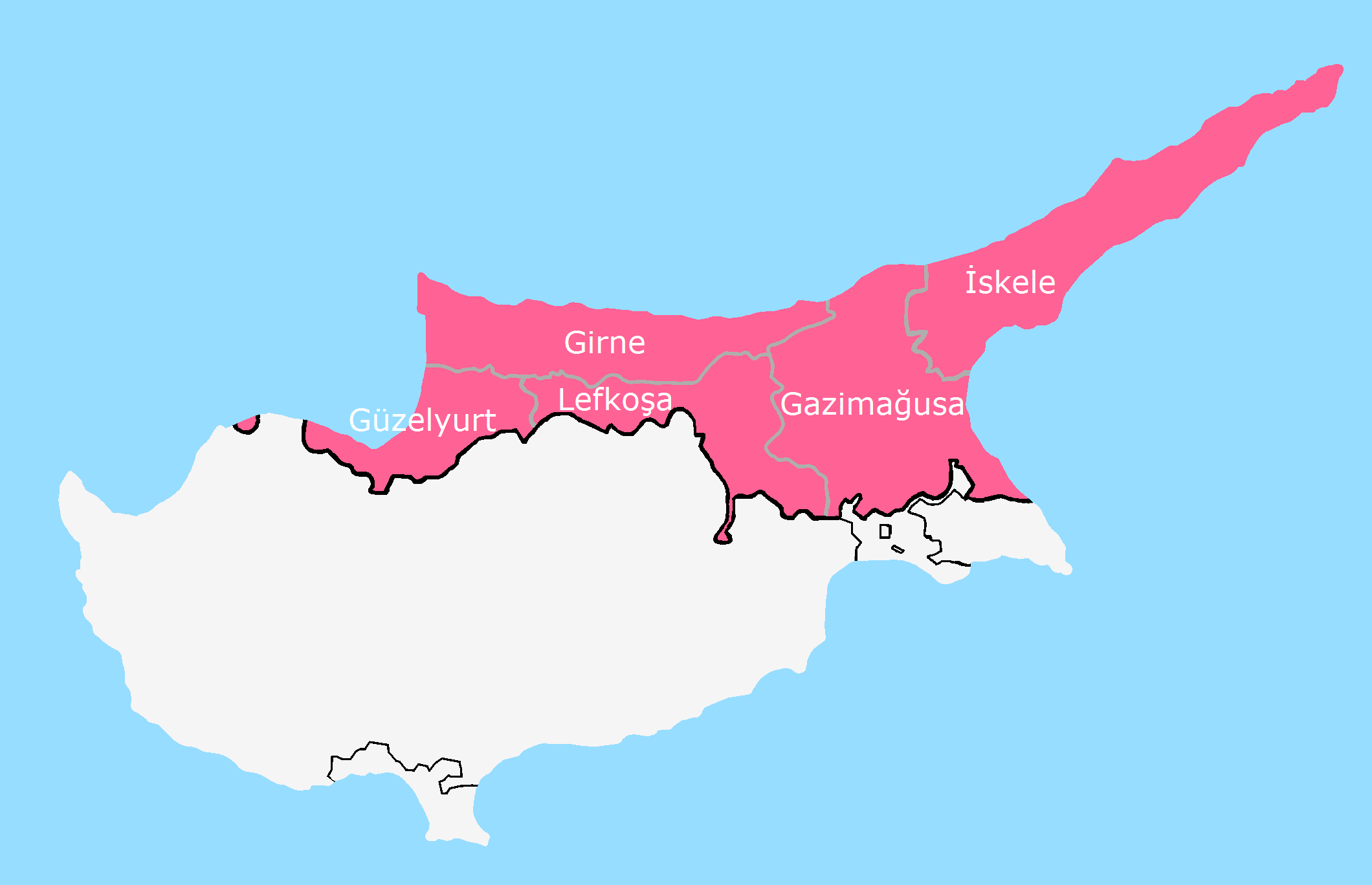
  Turkish-occupied Northern Cyprus (1974–present)
- 1975 May 16 — Sikkim becomes a part of India.
  Israel annexed East Jerusalem in 1980 (see Jerusalem Law) and the Golan Heights in 1981
  .
- 1975 November 28 — Portuguese Timor unilaterally declares independence from Portugal and forms the Democratic Republic of East Timor. It is invaded by Indonesia nine days later.
- 1976 July 2 — South Vietnam and North Vietnam are officially unified as Vietnam.
- 1976 July 17 — Indonesia incorporates occupied East Timor as the province of Timor Timur. This is declared illegal by the United Nations.
- 1982 — Pursuant to the Camp David Accords, Israel completes the withdrawal from the Sinai Peninsula.
- 1983 — The Turkish Republic of Northern Cyprus is declared but is not recognised by any country except Turkey.
- 1984 — The Iraq–Jordan border is revised, with the border now consisting of 6 straight lines.
- 1990 May 22 — North Yemen unites with South Yemen.
- 1990 August 2 — Kuwait is annexed by Iraq.
- 1991 February 27 — Kuwait is liberated from Iraq; Saudi Arabian–Iraqi neutral zone is officially recognized as being disbanded, having been de facto disbanded since 1981.
- 1992 — Abkhazia and South Ossetia declare their independence, but remain internationally recognised territories of Georgia.
- 1994 — Under the Oslo Agreements, Israel transfers parts of the West Bank (Areas "A" and "B") and the majority of the Gaza Strip to the rule of the Palestinian National Authority.
- 1997 July 1 — Hong Kong is transferred to China by the UK as a special administrative region.
- 1999 December 20 — Macau is transferred to China by Portugal as a special administrative region.
- 2002 May 20 — East Timor gains independence 3 years after the end of its occupation by Indonesia.
- 2004 — Russia cedes Tarabarov Island and the eastern part of Bolshoy Ussuriysky Island to China as part of a permanent border demarcation.
- 2005 August 1 — Israel dismantles its settlements in the Gush Katif region of the Gaza Strip. The remainder of the Gaza Strip, most of which had already been transferred to Palestinian rule in 1994, becomes administered by the Palestinian Authority until 2007 when the territory is seized by the military wing of Hamas in a violent coup d'état.
- 2005 — Israel dismantles its settlements in the Northern Samaria region of the West Bank.
- 2008 — After Russian intervention in Georgia, both Abkhazia and South Ossetia gain territories, including Kodori Valley, from internationally recognised territories of Georgia.
- 2015 June 1 — Most of the enclaves on the India–Bangladesh border are exchanged.
- 2017 June 24 — Egypt cedes Sanafir Island and Tiran Island to Saudi Arabia as part of a maritime demarcation agreement.
- 2020 — While Nagorno-Karabakh remained an internationally recognised territory of Azerbaijan, the four UN Security Council resolutions, adopted in 1993 and demanding immediate withdrawal of the Armenian occupying forces from all occupied regions of Azerbaijan, remained unfulfilled until 2020. In 2020, a new war erupted in the region, which saw Azerbaijan retake control of most of southern Karabakh (Fuzuli, Jabrayil, Zangilan, Qubadli, Hadrut districts) and parts of north-eastern Karabakh (Talish, Madagiz). A trilateral ceasefire agreement signed on 10 November 2020, ended the war and forced Armenia to return control of all of the remaining territories surrounding Nagorno-Karabakh.
- 2021, November — The Qatar-Saudi border is demarcated, giving Qatar access to the entirety of Khor Al Adaid.
- 2021, December — Kyrgyzstan and Uzbekistan sign a border agreement, swapping the Andijan Reservoir with 13,868 ha (34,270 acres) of Uzbek border lands.
- 2024 January 1 — As part of the 2023 Nagorno-Karabakh ceasefire agreement, the Republic of Artsakh is dissolved and reintegrated into Azerbaijan.
- 2024 April 19 — Armenia cedes four abandoned villages along the border with Azerbaijan: Bağanıs Ayrım, Aşağı Əskipara, Xeyrimli, and Qızılhacılı.
- 2026 February — Pakistani forces claimed to have seized Ghudwana amid the 2026 Afghanistan–Pakistan War and merged the region into its Zhob District in Balochistan Province. The region is currently administered by Pakistan (Pakistan Army) while it is claimed by Afghanistan (Taliban).

== Europe ==
Map of territorial changes in Europe after World War I (as of 1923).

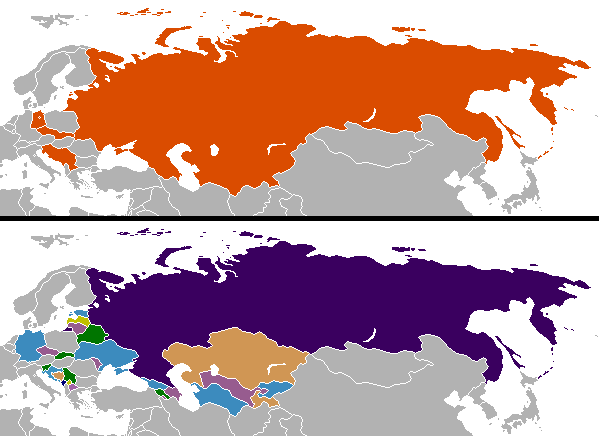
Changes in national boundaries after the end of the Cold War.

- 1917 December 6 — The Grand Duchy of Finland declares its full independence from the collapsing Russian Empire.
- 1918 — Ukraine, Belarus, Poland, Latvia, Lithuania, Estonia, Georgia, Armenia and Azerbaijan declare their independence from the Russian Empire. The Kingdom of Serbs, Croats, and Slovenes (later known as the Kingdom of Yugoslavia) is formed. Denmark and Iceland sign the Danish–Icelandic Act of Union, which establishes the Kingdom of Iceland as a sovereign state in a personal union with Denmark.
- 1919–20 — After the dissolution of Austria-Hungary, the fates of the successor states are decided by the Treaty of Saint-Germain signed September 10, 1919, and by the Treaty of Trianon signed June 4, 1920, respectively. This results in Austria and Hungary with reduced borders, while Czechoslovakia is formed from their former territories. Other territories of the former monarchy are additionally awarded to Italy, Poland, Romania and the newly formed Kingdom of Serbs, Croats and Slovenes. In 1919, Germany suffered substantial territorial losses in the Treaty of Versailles. Belgium receives Neutral Moresnet and three German cantons as compensation for extensive damage during World War I. These three cantons still form the German-speaking community of Belgium: Eupen, Malmedy and Sankt Vith. Denmark receives Northern Schleswig from Germany (with local plebiscites concluding in 1920). Most of the Prussian provinces of Posen and of West Prussia go to Poland. The east part of Upper Silesia and the area of Soldau in East Prussia are annexed to Poland as well. Danzig and Saarland fall under the control of the League of Nations. The Memel territory comes under a temporary French administration.
- 1920 — Greece is promised most of eastern Thrace as well as Ionia with the city of İzmir (Smyrna) in the Treaty of Sèvres. Soviet Russia invades and occupies Azerbaijan. Soviet Russia recognizes the independence of Georgia. Soviet Russia invades and occupies Armenia. The Free State of Fiume is established as a result of an Italo–Yugoslav border dispute.
- 1921 — As a result of winning a war against Soviet Russia, Poland gains territories east of the Curzon Line, inhabited essentially by Lithuanians, Belarusians, Poles, and Ukrainians.
- 1921 — Soviet Russia invades and occupies Georgia. The Treaty of Kars rearranges the borders in the South Caucasus, considerable territories of Georgia and Armenia are ceded to Turkey.
- 1922 December 6 — The Irish Free State and the United Kingdom of Great Britain and Northern Ireland are formed from the United Kingdom of Great Britain and Ireland. The United Kingdom maintains Treaty Ports at Berehaven, Cobh, and Lough Swilly.
- 1922 December 29 — The Soviet Union is officially formed under the Treaty on the Creation of the USSR.
- 1923 — The Treaty of Sèvres is superseded by the Treaty of Lausanne under which Greece loses its earlier territorial gains and the borders of modern Turkey are established. Western Thrace is ceded by Bulgaria to Greece, a decision earlier agreed upon in the 1919 Treaty of Neuilly-sur-Seine. On the Baltic sea, Lithuania annexes the Memel territory without plebiscite. Italian military forces take control of the Greek island of Corfu.
- 1924 February 22 — The Treaty of Rome comes into effect, ending the existence of the Free State of Fiume and the Italo–Yugoslav border dispute. The treaty assigns Fiume (Rijeka) to Italy and Sušak to Yugoslavia, with joint port administration. On March 16, Italy formally annexes Fiume.
- 1926 — Albania cedes territory to the Kingdom of Slovenes, Croats and Serbs.
- 1929 February 11 — The Vatican City becomes independent after the signing of the Lateran Treaty with Italy.
- 1931 July 10 — Norway issues a royal decree annexing Erik the Red's Land in Greenland.
- 1932 July 12 — Norway further annexes an area roughly corresponding to modern-day King Frederick VI Coast.
- 1933 September 5 — Norway returns both territories to Denmark after the Permanent Court of International Justice ruled against their claim on the regions.
- 1935 March 1 — The Territory of the Saar Basin is reunited with Germany following the 1935 plebiscite.
  All territories taken from Czechoslovakia by its neighbours in October 1938 (Munich Agreement) and March 1939
- 1938 March 13 — Austria is annexed by Nazi Germany in the Anschluss.
- 1938 April 25 — The United Kingdom agrees to return its three Treaty Ports to Ireland as part of the Anglo-Irish Trade Agreement over the course of the next several months.
- 1938 September 30 — Czechoslovakia is forced to cede the Sudetenland to Germany as part of the Munich Agreement. Independently, Poland annexes the disputed area of Trans-Olza following an ultimatum to Czechoslovakia.
- 1938 November 2 — Hungary is awarded southern Slovakia and parts of the Subcarpathian Rus' in the First Vienna Award. Shortly after, Poland seizes small border regions.
- 1939 March 14 — The Slovak part of Czechoslovakia declares independence with German support.
- 1939 March 15 — Germany invades the remaining Czech lands and establishes the semi-autonomous Protectorate of Bohemia and Moravia. Hungary invades and annexes the remainder of the Subcarpathian Rus'.
- 1939 March 23 — Following a German ultimatum, Lithuania gives up the Memel Territory.
- 1939 April 4 — In the aftermath of the Slovak–Hungarian War, Slovakia is forced to cede a strip of its eastern territory.
- 1939 April 15 — The nominally independent Italian protectorate of Albania is established under a personal union with Italy following the Italian invasion of Albania.
- World War II — With the Invasion of Poland and the Outbreak of World War II, a period of many temporary and permanent border changes occur as the Axis powers and the Soviet Union conquer, re-divide and annex various areas under their control.
- 1939 September 1 — Fall of Poland — With the last battle over, the Polish territory is divided between Germany, Slovakia, the Soviet Union and Lithuania.

Poland is divided between its neighbors

  - 1939 September 26 — The Free City of Danzig and a large portion of Poland are annexed into Germany. The remainder of the territory occupied by Germany is reorganized under the General Government.
  - 1939 September 28 — The German-Soviet border in occupied Poland is finalized with the German–Soviet Boundary and Friendship Treaty.
  - 1939 October 10 — The Soviet–Lithuanian Mutual Assistance Treaty is signed, in which parts of the Soviet-occupied Vilnius Region is awarded to Lithuania.
  - 1939 November 1 and 2 — The remaining Soviet-occupied Polish lands are incorporated into the Ukrainian SSR and the Byelorussian SSR, following the approval of rigged election results by their respective Supreme Soviets.
  - 1939 November 26 — Germany grants Slovakia the territories lost in 1938 and 1920-1924 as a reward for their contribution in the Invasion of Poland.
- 1940 March 12 — The Soviet Union forces Finland to cede various territories in the Moscow peace treaty, ending the increasingly untenable Winter War.
- 1940 May 18 — Eupen-Malmedy is reincorporated into Germany after the Invasion of Belgium.
- 1940 June 22 — The Second Armistice is signed, signalling German victory over France. The terms dictate occupation over northern and western France, while the collaborationist French State is allowed to govern the unoccupied lands alongside the oversea colonies.
- 1940 June 24 — The Franco-Italian Armistice is signed, awarding Italy a thin strip of land on the border. An additional 50 km demilitarized zone is established, in which Italian influence eventually amounts to a de facto annexation.
- 1940 June 28 — Romania is forced to give up Bessarabia to the Soviet Union with German pressure to fulfill their Ultimatum.
- 1940 August 2 — Luxembourg and the area of Alsace-Lorraine are put under civil administration and attached to adjacent Reichsgaue. While never formally incorporated, these areas were increasingly put under German Laws and are widely considered to have been fully annexed.
- 1940 August 3 — The Soviet Union annexes Lithuania after the rigged 1940 Lithuanian parliamentary elections were held. This was preceded by a long period of increasing Soviet influence and the military occupation of the country.
- 1940 August 5 — The Soviet Union annexes Latvia in a very similar fashion to Lithuania, acceding them into one of its constituent republics by illegitimate means following the 1940 Latvian parliamentary elections.
- 1940 August 6 — The Soviet Union annexes Estonia, once again after the respective 1940 Estonian parliamentary elections are held.
- 1940 August 30 — Hungary is awarded Northern Transylvania from Romania as part of the Second Vienna Award.
- 1940 September 7 — South Dobruja is relinquished by Romania to Bulgaria after reaching an agreement and signing the Treaty of Craiova.
- 1941 April 1 — Balkan Campaign — At the conclusion of the Invasion of Yugoslavia and Greece, both countries are divided among the participants. Yugoslavia is divided between Italy and their Albanian puppet, Germany, Hungary, Bulgaria and the newly established Independent State of Croatia, with Montenegro falling under Italian occupation and the rest under German occupation. Greece is occupied by German, Italian and Bulgarian forces, with the last directly annexing its zone.

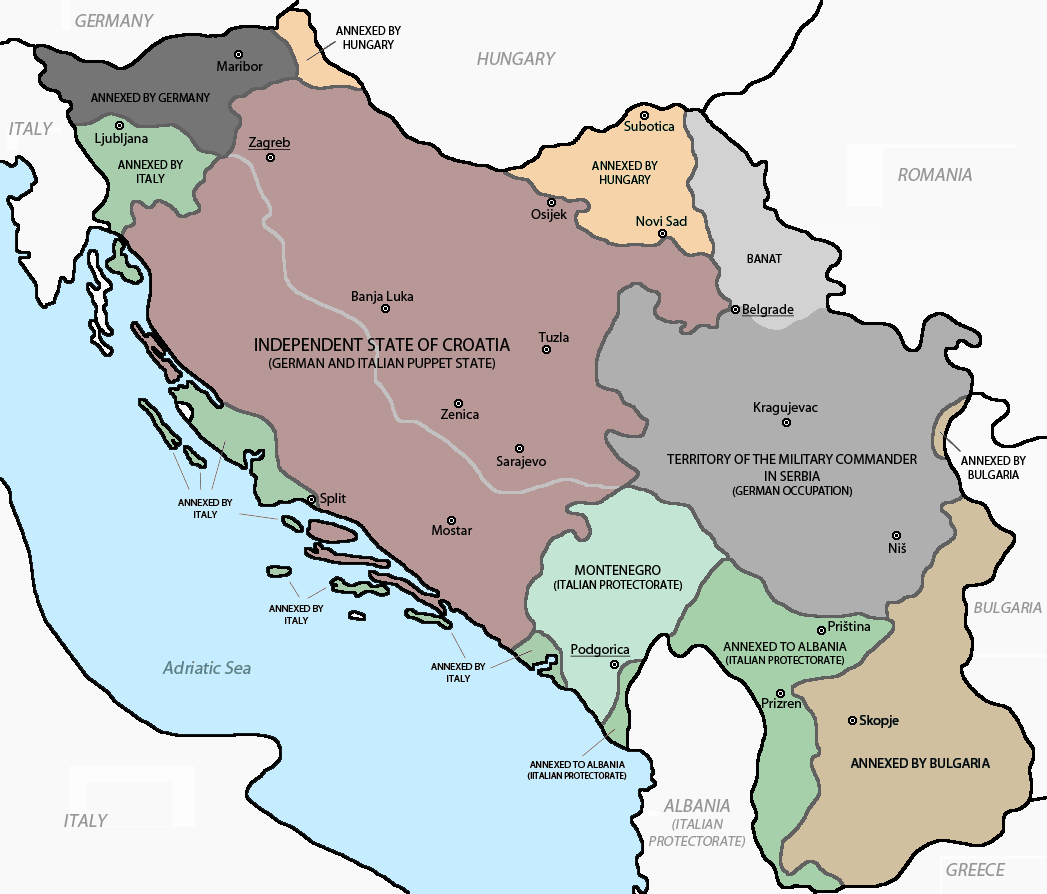
Yugoslavia is partitioned

  - 1941 April 10 — While the invasion is still ongoing, the Independent State of Croatia is proclaimed by Slavko Kvaternik. The country remains under partial joint Italian-German occupation.
  - 1941 April 14 — The German-occupied parts of Slovenia are put under civil administration and attached to adjacent Reichsgaue. Similarly to Luxembourg and Alsace-Lorraine, these areas were never fully annexed, instead being set up in preparation for eventual integration.
  - 1941 April 24 — The Bulgarian Occupation zone and the territory to be annexed into Italian Albania is agreed upon after multiple meetings with Germany.
  - 1941 May 3 — Italy issues a royal decree, annexing parts of Slovenia as the Province of Ljubljana.
  - 1941 May 14 — Bulgaria annexes the occupied areas of Greece.
  - 1941 May 18 — The main Treaty of Rome of 1941 settles the Dalmatian territory annexed by Italy from the Independent State of Croatia. Later treaties define their borders in Ljubljana and Italian-occupied Montenegro.
  - 1941 June 30 — Bulgaria fully incorporates its occupied territories in Yugoslavia. As the war continues, Germany allows Bulgarian troops to occupy more territory to free up forces for the Eastern Front.
  - 1941 August 16 — The Yugoslav territories occupied by Hungary are put under civilian administration and fully integrated four months later.

German-occupied Europe at the height of the Axis conquests in 1942

- 1941 August 19 — After the liberation of Bessarabia, Romania integrates the reconquered territories as the autonomous Bessarabia Governorate.
- 1941 December 9 — Finland re-integrates the territories lost in the Moscow Peace Treaty during the Continuation War.
- 1942 November 11 — Case Anton is executed, ending the nominal independence of Vichy France and placing the entire country under German-Italian military administration.
- 1943 September 10 — In response to the Italian surrender, Germany executes Operation Achse and invades their former ally, setting up a puppet state in northern Italy. In addition to taking over all territories previously under Italian occupation, Germany splits apart lands from the Italian Social Republic, forming the Operational Zones of the Adriatic Littoral and of the Alpine Foothills in northeastern Italy and attaching them to adjacent Reichsgaue.
- 1944 June 17 — Iceland officially declares complete independence from Denmark. The country had been de facto independent since the German invasion of Denmark.
- 1944 September 19 — The Moscow Armistice is signed between Finland and the Soviet Union, ending hostilities between the two countries. Finland is forced to return all territory previously ceded with the Moscow Peace Treaty in addition to Petsamo and a lease on Porkkala.
- 1945 — End of the War — With the total defeat of Germany, the war is finally over. All territorial changes made by the Axis Powers are fully reverted, with the notable exception of Bulgaria keeping Southern Dobruja.

Post-war border changes in Central Europe and creation of the Communist Eastern Bloc

- 1945 — The borders of Germany are moved west to the Oder-Neisse line, while the approximate boundary of the Curzon Line is used as the eastern border of Poland. In addition to incorporating the Kresy territories, the Soviet Union also annexed the Baltic states, Carpathian Ruthenia from Czechoslovakia, and Bessarabia, the Hertsa region, and Northern Bukovina from Romania. From Germany, the Soviet Union acquired the northeastern third of the former East Prussian exclave with the Klaipeda/Memel region becoming part of the Lithuanian SSR and the bulk of the territory forming the Kaliningrad Oblast of the Russian SFSR. Additionally, Finland ceded major portions of Karelia and Salla to the Soviet Union as well as islands in the Gulf of Finland, the whole Petsamo, and a lease to use Porkkala as a Soviet naval base for 50 years.
- 1946 — Saarland is separated from (occupied) Germany by France and became a French protectorate on February 16 of that year but was not recognized by the Allied Control Council ruling entire Germany (and Austria) so it was a disputed territory in the international law. The Faroe Islands declare independence from Denmark after a referendum. Denmark does not recognise the results and dissolves the Faroese parliament a few days later, and hold a second referendum, which passes in favour of continued union with Denmark.
- 1947 — In the Paris Peace Treaties of 1947, Italy cedes the Dodecanese to Greece; La Brigue and Tende to France; 3 settlements of the Bratislava bridgehead to Czechoslovakia; and Goriška, Inner Carniola, most of Istria, Zadar, its Dalmatian and Kvarner islands (such as Lastovo and Cres), and Rijeka (Fiume) to the newly established Federal Peoples' Republic of Yugoslavia. Trieste becomes the capital city of the Free Territory of Trieste established as an independent sovereign state at the coming into force of the treaty (September 15).
- 1948 — Following the signing of the Moscow Protocol of 1948, the Soviet Union formally annexes some Danubian islands and the Snake Island in the Black Sea from Romania.
- 1949 April 23 — The Netherlands annexes the villages Elten, Tüddern and some smaller localities from Germany.
- 1949 May 23 — The Federal Republic of Germany (West Germany) is established.
- 1949 August 15 — Switzerland and Liechtenstein exchange territories in the area of Rhine-Würznerhorn.
- 1949 October 7 — The German Democratic Republic (East Germany) is established.
- 1951 February 15 — Polish and Soviet border exchange along the border of the Ukrainian SSR.
- 1954 — The Free Territory of Trieste is dissolved and divided between Yugoslavia and Italy.
- 1955 April 23 — Italy and Switzerland modify the border in the zone of Lago di Lei
- 1955 June 27 — The Austrian State Treaty comes into force, establishing an independent Austrian state from the four occupation zones of the Allied powers.
- 1956 — The Soviet Union returns Porkkala to Finland.
- 1957 January 1 — The Saar Protectorate is incorporated into West Germany as a state after the 1955 referendum.
- 1961 — An adjustment to the Meuse river between The Netherlands and Belgium results in three small packages of land being exchanged between the two countries.
- 1963 — The 1949 Dutch acquisitions of West German territory are almost completely reverted; the Duivelsberg remains permanently with the Netherlands.
- 1964 — Malta becomes independent from the United Kingdom.
- 1972 — The United Kingdom formally annexes Rockall (by the Island of Rockall Act 1972, declaring it to be part of Scotland). Ireland does not recognise the UK's territorial claim to Rockall.
- 12 February 1986 — France and the United Kingdom sign the Treaty of Canterbury, defining a land frontier between the two countries. This border becomes physical with the breakthrough of the Channel Tunnel on 1 December 1990.
- 1990 — East Germany unites with West Germany on October 3. Transnistria declares independence from the Moldavian SSR but is not recognised by any country.
- 1991 — Estonia, Latvia and Lithuania restore their independence from Soviet occupation. With the complete dissolution of the Soviet Union, it is split up into a further 12 independent states, including the European states of Russia, Belarus, Ukraine, Moldova, Georgia, Armenia and Azerbaijan. The independence of all the former Soviet republics is recognised by December 26 (except the Baltic states, which the Soviet Union recognized on September 6). Slovenia (June 25) including the former "zone B" of the Free Territory of Trieste, Croatia (June 25), and the Republic of Macedonia (September 8) all declare their independence from Yugoslavia. Croatia and Slovenia are formally recognized on January 15, 1992, and Macedonia in April 1993.
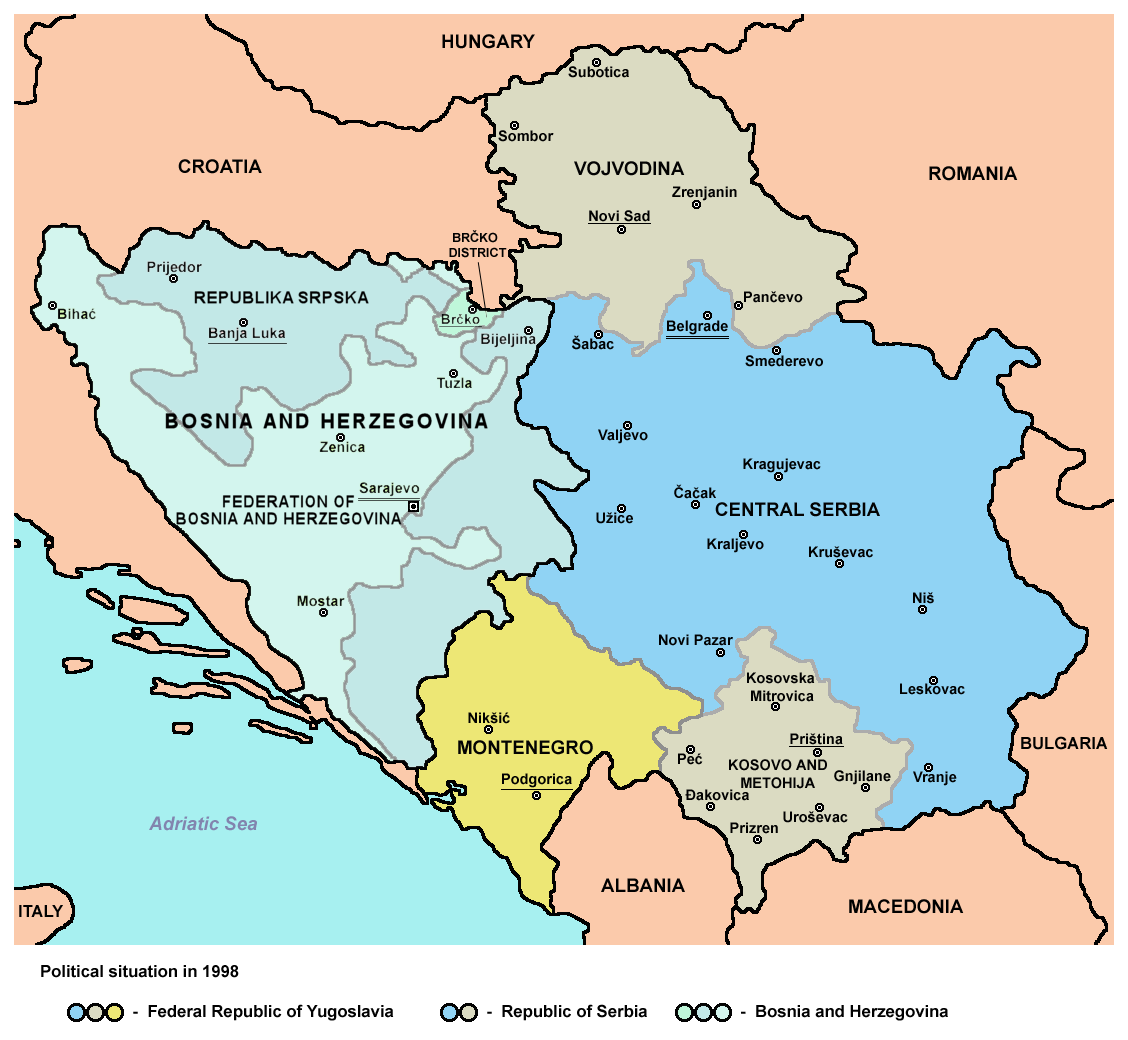
  Map of the Federal Republic of Yugoslavia and Bosnia and Herzegovina in 1998
- 1992 — Bosnia and Herzegovina declares independence from Yugoslavia on March 1 and is formally recognised on April 6. A civil war breaks out, and as the result of the war, two largely autonomous entities are formed: Federation of Bosnia and Herzegovina and Republika Srpska. The remaining of Yugoslavia becomes the Federal Republic of Yugoslavia (renamed to Serbia and Montenegro in 2003).
- 1993 January 1 — Czechoslovakia is dissolved into the Czech Republic and Slovakia in the "Velvet Divorce".
- 1999 June 23 — Belgium and The Netherlands make a small border change at the Ghent-Terneuzen Canal.
- 2001 August 28 — Andorra and France exchange land to allow the Andorran Envalira Tunnel to connect to the French RN22.
- 2003 — Lithuania's share of Lake Vištytis increases to about 383 ha (about 22% from 2.2%) from a new border treaty with Russia.
- 2006 June 3 — The State Union of Serbia and Montenegro is dissolved following a referendum; Montenegro and Serbia each become independent states.
- 2008 February 17 — Kosovo unilaterally declares independence from Serbia. The declaration is strongly opposed by Serbia and recognised by at least 110 out of 193 UN member states.
- 2014 March 18 — Russia annexes Crimea from Ukraine, following an internationally unrecognized plebiscite.
- 2016 November 28 — Belgium and the Netherlands swap land near Lanaye and Oost-Maarland over the discovery of a headless body several years prior, which the Belgian authorities could not access without crossing Dutch territory. The border has been straightened out and now runs down the centre of the Meuse River. The change took effect on 1 January 2018.

Regions of Ukraine annexed by Russia since 2014 (Crimea) and 2022 (Donetsk, Kherson, Luhansk and Zaporizhzhia), with a red line marking the area of actual control by Russia on 30 September 2022.

- 2022 February 21 — The State Duma of Russia passed a bill to officially recognize the self-proclaimed Donetsk People's Republic and Luhansk People's Republic in Eastern Ukraine as independent states. The bill was approved by President Vladimir Putin. Russia began an invasion of Ukraine on 24 February, in a major escalation of the Russo-Ukrainian War that began in 2014.
- 2022 September 30 — Russia unilaterally declares the annexation of the Ukrainian oblasts of Luhansk, Donetsk, Zaporizhzhia, and Kherson. Similar to the annexation of Crimea in 2014, this border change is not recognised internationally.

== North America ==
- 1927 April 1 — The Imperial Privy Council of the United Kingdom establishes the boundaries of the Dominion of Newfoundland and Canada, in particular, the province of Quebec, which affirmed that territories claimed by Quebec were part of Newfoundland. Previous maps showed the disputed territory as undefined.
- 1949 March 31 — The Dominion of Newfoundland joins Canada. The territory is now called Newfoundland and Labrador.
- 1962 August 6 — Jamaica gains independence from the United Kingdom.
- 1962 August 31 — Trinidad and Tobago gains independence from the United Kingdom.
- 1966 November 30 — Barbados gains independence from the United Kingdom.
- 1973 July 10 — The Commonwealth of The Bahamas gains independence from the United Kingdom.
- 1974 February 7 — Grenada gains independence from the United Kingdom.
- 1977 — The town of Río Rico, Tamaulipas is ceded into Mexico from the US.
- 1978 November 3 — The Commonwealth of Dominica gains independence from the United Kingdom.
- 1979 February 22 — Saint Lucia gains independence from the United Kingdom.
- 1979 October 27 — Saint Vincent and the Grenadines gains independence from the United Kingdom.
- 1981 September 21 — The British self-governing colony of British Honduras gains independence as Belize.
- 1981 November 25 — Antigua and Barbuda gains independence from the United Kingdom.
- 1983 September 19 — The Federation of Saint Christopher and Nevis gains independence from the United Kingdom.
- 1986 January 1 — Aruba secedes from the Netherlands Antilles to become a constituent country of the Kingdom of the Netherlands.
- 1999 — Panama Canal Zone returns from joint US–Panamanian control to Panamanian control. A previous important development was the 1979 change from US control to joint US–Panama control, with plans for full Panamanian sovereignty at some point after that.
- 2010 — The Netherlands Antilles is dissolved, as Curaçao and Sint Maarten become constituent countries of the Kingdom of the Netherlands, while Bonaire, Saba and Sint Eustatius become special municipalities of the Netherlands.
- 2022 June 14 — Hans Island is split between Canada and the Danish territory of Greenland, ending the cordial Whisky War.
- 2023 May 26 — The Netherlands and France make an agreement to clarify the border in Sint-Maarten after a dispute in 2016; the treaty is not yet in effect.

== Oceania ==
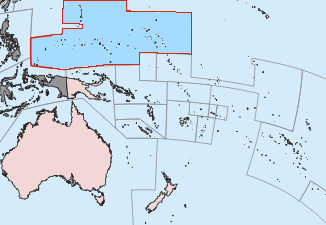
Trust Territory of the Pacific Islands in Micronesia administered by the United States from 1947 to 1986

- 1919 June 28 — The Treaty of Versailles divides Germany's Pacific colonies into mandates of the victors as follows:
  - All German islands south of the equator are given to Imperial Japan as the South Seas Mandate.
  - German Samoa is administered by New Zealand as Western Samoa.
  - Nauru is administered by the United Kingdom and later by Australia.
  - All remaining territories of German New Guinea are administered by Australia as the Territory of New Guinea.
- 1946 — United States formally mandate South Seas Mandate from Japan, becomes the Trust Territory of the Pacific Islands.
- 1949 July 1 — The Territory of New Guinea joins with the Australian Territory of Papua to form The Territory of Papua and New Guinea. The union is an administrative one only and does not affect the separate position of the Territory of New Guinea as a territory governed by Australia as a United Nations trust territory.
- 1955 November 23 — The Cocos (Keeling) Islands are transferred from Singapore to Australia.
- 1958 October 1 — Christmas Island is transferred from Singapore to Australia.
- 1968 January 31 — The joint British, Australian and New Zealand UN Trust Territory of Nauru gains independence.
- 1969 — Western Papua becomes part of Indonesia under the 1969 Act of Free Choice.
- 1970 June 4 — Tonga ends its 70 year status as a British protectorate and gains full independence.
- 1970 October 10 — The British colony of Fiji gains independence.
- 1974 — A referendum is held in the British colony of the Gilbert and Ellice Islands. Per the results of the referendum, the colony was divided into two.
- 1975 September 16 — The Territory of New Guinea and the Territory of Papua which were in an administrative union under Australian governance with the name Papua New Guinea are unified as a single sovereign country called the Independent State of Papua New Guinea.
- 1978 July 7 — The British colony of the British Solomon Islands gains independence as the Solomon Islands.
- 1978 October 1 — The British colony of the Ellice Islands gains independence as Tuvalu.
- 1978 — The Northern Mariana Islands breaks away from the Trust Territory of the Pacific Islands, becomes a U.S. Commonwealth.
- 1979 — The Marshall Islands leaves the Trust Territory of the Pacific Islands, becomes an independent country while also an associated state with the U.S.
- 1979 — The Federated States of Micronesia formed from part of the Trust Territory of the Pacific, also independent as an associated state with the U.S.
- 1979 — The British colony of the Gilbert Islands gains independence as the Republic of Kiribati.
- 1980 — The Anglo-French New Hebrides Condominium gains independence as the Republic of Vanuatu.
- 1994 — The Republic of Palau is formed from the remainder of the Trust Territory of the Pacific, as an independent state associated with the U.S.

== South America ==
- 1930 — Bouvet Island is declared a Norwegian dependency after a dispute with the United Kingdom.
- 1938 — A ceasefire signed between Paraguay and Bolivia awards Paraguay three-quarters of the Chaco Boreal which it took over during the Chaco War (1932–35).
- 1941 — The Rio Protocol recognises Peru as having control of the territory it won in the Ecuadorian–Peruvian War.
- 1966 May 26 — The colony of British Guiana gains independence from the United Kingdom as Guyana.
- 1975 November 25 — The Dutch constituent country of Suriname gains independence from the Kingdom of the Netherlands as the Republic of Suriname.

== World maps showing borders ==
(Click to enlarge)

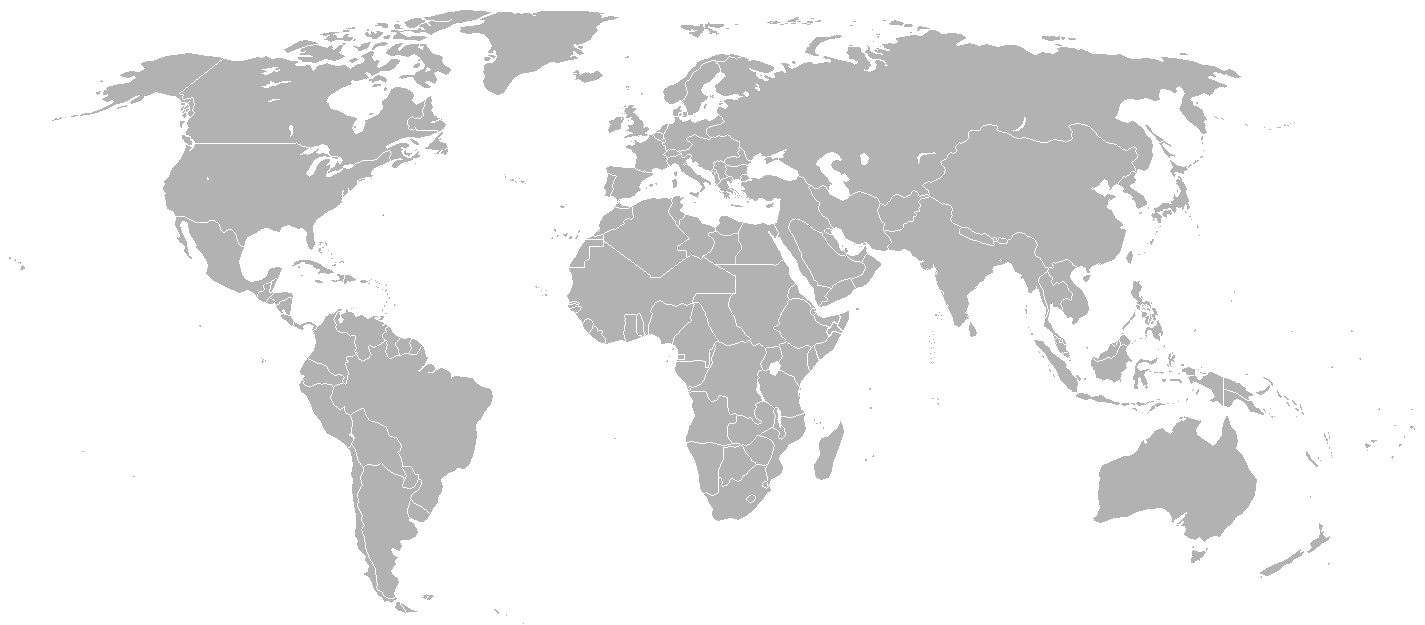
National boundaries around the time of the start of the First World War (1914)

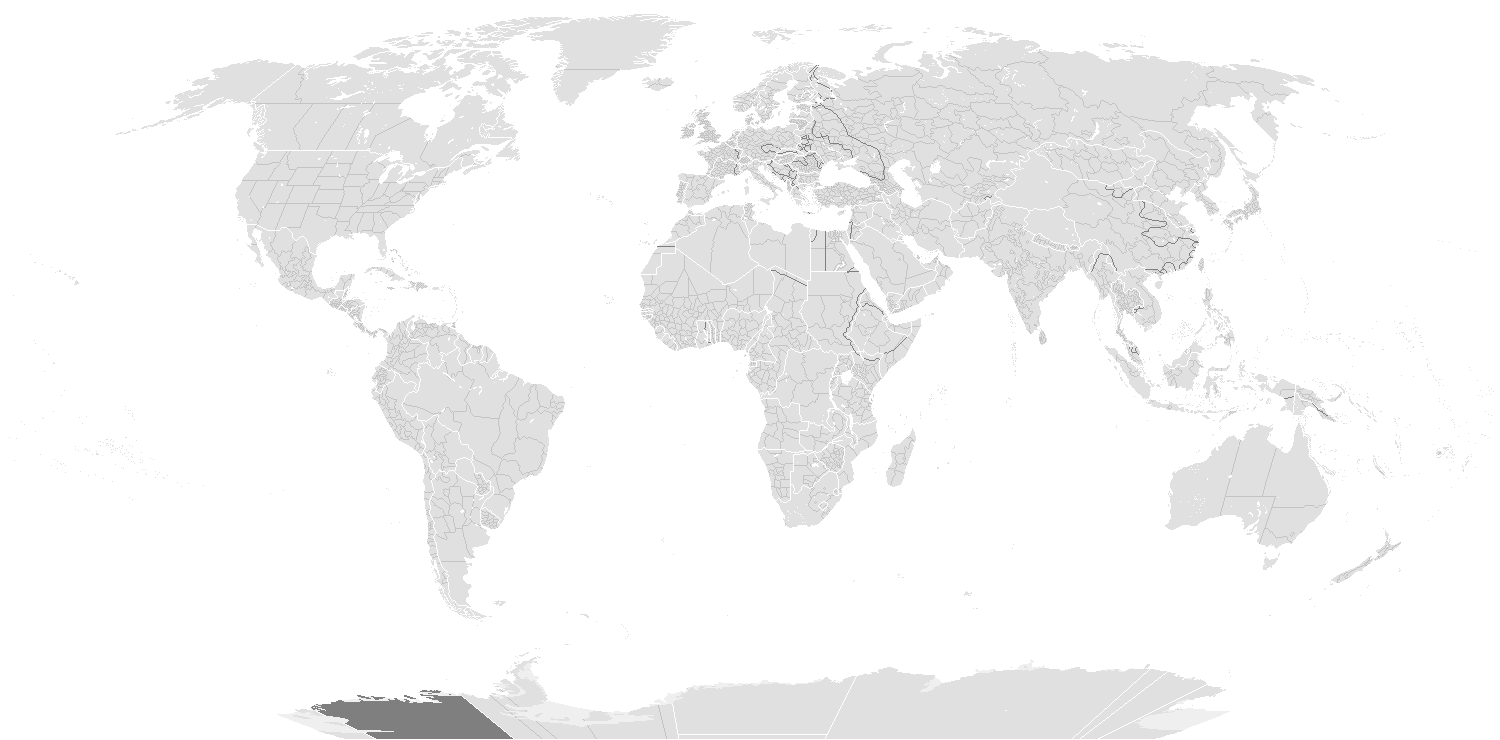
Boundaries during the Second World War in November 1942, at the height of Axis power, especially in Europe.

National boundaries in 1985, during the Cold War

Present-day boundaries

== See also ==
- Timeline of geopolitical changes (1900–1999)
- Timeline of geopolitical changes (2000–present)
- List of border conflicts
