= Timeline of geopolitical changes (2000–present) =

- Timeline of geopolitical changes (before 1500); Timeline of geopolitical changes (1500–1899); Timeline of geopolitical changes (1900–1999); Timeline of geopolitical changes (2000–present)

This is a timeline of geopolitical changes around the world since 2000. It includes dates of declarations of independence, changes in country name, changes of capital city or name, and changes in territory such as the annexation, cession, concession, occupation, or secession of land. Territorial conquests as a result of war are included on the timeline at the conclusion of military campaigns. However, those changes in the course of specific battles and day-to-day operations are generally not included in this list. Changes in airspace and maritime territory are included only when they are subject to a dispute. (Note: Lists of non-disputed maritime claims can be found in the articles on exclusive economic zones and maritime boundary treaties.)

== 2000s ==
Year	Date	Event
2000	20 March	Six weeks after the fall of Grozny, the Chechen Republic of Ichkeria is overthrown as a state following its defeat in the Battle of Komsomolskoye; as an insurgency it continues to resist Russian rule in Chechnya for years.
2000	24 May	Israel completely withdraws from its occupation zone in southern Lebanon, where it is replaced by United Nations Interim Force in Lebanon peacekeeping forces.
2000	12 June	Saudi Arabia and Yemen sign a treaty resolving their border dispute.
2000	17 August	Colombia returns its capital city's name from Santa Fe de Bogotá back to Bogotá, Distrito Capital.
2000	5 September	Taloqan, the de facto capital of the Islamic State of Afghanistan, falls to the Taliban's Islamic Emirate of Afghanistan. The capital moves to Fayzabad.
2001	16 March	The ICJ resolves the territorial dispute between Bahrain and Qatar, awarding Fasht Al Azm, Qit'at Jaradah, and most of the Hawar Islands to Bahrain, and Fasht Dibal, Zubarah, and Janan Island to Qatar.
2001	21 March	Qatar and Saudi Arabia sign a treaty resolving their border dispute.
2001	1 July	The temporarily independent Puntland State of Somalia adopts a new constitution explicitly identifying itself as an "independent integral part of Somalia".
2001	7 October	The United States and a NATO-led alliance invade Afghanistan, beginning an occupation which continued until 2021.
2001	13 November	The capital of the Islamic State of Afghanistan returns to Kabul with the reconquest of the city by the forces of the Northern Alliance, beginning a cascading collapse of the Taliban forces of the Islamic Emirate of Afghanistan.
2001	17 December	The Islamic Emirate of Afghanistan is completely overthrown following its defeat in the Battle of Tora Bora. The Taliban soon reemerges as an insurgency.
2001	23 December	The Federal Islamic Republic of the Comoros changes its name to the Union of the Comoros.
2002	14 February	The State of Bahrain changes its name to the Kingdom of Bahrain.
2002	10 March	The Union of the Comoros reabsorbs the de facto independent State of Anjouan. Mutsamudu yields to Moroni as the capital.
2002	20 May	The Democratic Republic of Timor-Leste gains independence with the promulgation of a constitution and the conclusion of the United Nations Transitional Administration in East Timor. Dili remains the capital.
2002	21 May	The United Kingdom changes the title of its British Dependent Territories to that of British Overseas Territories. The citizens of each British Overseas Territory gain full British citizenship.
2003	4 February	The Federal Republic of Yugoslavia changes its name to the State Union of Serbia and Montenegro.
2003	20 March	United States-led coalition forces invade Iraq, beginning an occupation which lasts for more than eight years.
2003	28 March	France reorganizes the Territorial collectivity of Saint Pierre and Miquelon as the Overseas collectivity of Saint Pierre and Miquelon.
2003	28 March	France reorganizes the Overseas Territory of Wallis and Futuna as the Overseas collectivity of Wallis and Futuna.
2003	28 March	France reorganizes the Overseas Territory of French Polynesia as the Overseas collectivity of French Polynesia.
2003	15 April	United States forces conquer Tikrit, the last stronghold of Ba'athist Iraq.
2003	26 May	The Rwandese Republic changes its name to the Republic of Rwanda.
2004	9 January	Kazakhstan agrees to a revision of the terms of Russia's lease of the Baikonur Cosmodrome, extending it to 2050 with no established options on further extensions.
2004	27 February	France elevates the Overseas collectivity of French Polynesia to the Overseas Country of French Polynesia.
2004	29 March	Bulgaria, Estonia, Latvia, Lithuania, Romania, Slovakia, and Slovenia join NATO in the alliance's fifth enlargement.
2004	1 May	Ten more states join the European Union: Cyprus, Czech Republic, Estonia, Hungary, Latvia, Lithuania, Malta, Poland, Slovakia, and Slovenia.
2004	1 September	The Antarctic Treaty Secretariat administering Antarctica and all lands and waters south of the 60th parallel south establishes its headquarters in Buenos Aires, Argentina.
2004	7 December	The Islamic State of Afghanistan changes its name to the Islamic Republic of Afghanistan with the end of the transitional period set out in the new constitution.
2005	27 April	Syrian troops withdraw from Lebanon, bringing an end to the Syrian occupation of Lebanon.
2005	12 September	Israel completely withdraws its forces from the Gaza Strip. A Palestinian Civil War leads to Gaza effectively withdrawing from the Palestinian Authority and becoming a separate entity under Hamas by June 2007.
2005	6 November	Myanmar moves its capital from Yangon to Naypyidaw.
2006		Uzbekistan rejoins the Collective Security Treaty Organization after previously leaving in 1999.
2006	3 June	The Republic of Montenegro secedes from the State Union of Serbia and Montenegro. Podgorica remains the capital.
2006	5 June	The Republic of Serbia supersedes the State Union of Serbia and Montenegro. Belgrade remains the capital.
2006	7 October	Palau moves its capital from Koror to Ngerulmud.
2007	1 January	Bulgaria and Romania join the European Union.
2007	15 January	The Kingdom of Nepal changes its name to the State of Nepal.
2007	21 February	France detaches the overseas collectivity of Saint Barthélemy from Guadeloupe. Gustavia becomes the capital.
2007	21 February	France detaches the overseas collectivity of The Collectivity of Saint Martin from Guadeloupe. Marigot becomes the capital.
2007	21 February	France integrates the Scattered Islands in the Indian Ocean into the French Southern and Antarctic Lands as its fifth district.
2007	22 October	The Republic of Montenegro changes its name to Montenegro.
2008	17 February	The Republic of Kosovo declares independence from Serbia, which continues to claim it as the Autonomous Province of Kosovo and Metohija; other countries divide on recognizing its declaration. Pristina remains the capital.
2008	4 August	The State of Nepal changes its name to the Federal Democratic Republic of Nepal.
2008	11 August	The separatist forces of South Ossetia, supported by Russia, completely expel the forces of Georgia from the territory of the former South Ossetian Autonomous Oblast, which Georgia continues to claim in its entirety.
2008	12 August	The separatist forces of Abkhazia, supported by Russia, completely expel the forces of Georgia from Upper Abkhazia, the last territory held by Georgia in the region which it continues to claim in its entirety.
2008	14 August	Nigeria completes the transfer of Bakassi to Cameroon, fulfilling the terms of a 2002 ICJ ruling on the disputed territory.
2008	27 August	Russia recognizes the independence of Abkhazia and South Ossetia from Georgia. Most countries continue to recognize these territories as part of Georgia.
2008	14 October	China is ceded 174 km^{2} (67 sq mi) of land by Russia as part of a treaty delimiting the borders and settling a territorial dispute between the two countries.
2009	7 February	The Republic of Bolivia changes its name to the Plurinational State of Bolivia.
2009	1 April	Albania and Croatia join the North Atlantic Treaty Organization in the alliance's sixth enlargement.
2009	21 June	Implementing the decision of a November 2008 referendum, Greenland achieves expanded home rule within the Danish Realm.
2009	14 July	China is ceded 9 km^{2} (3.5 sq mi) of land by Kyrgyzstan as part of a treaty delimiting the borders between the two countries.
2009	1 September	The British Overseas Territory of Saint Helena and Dependencies changes its name to Saint Helena, Ascension and Tristan da Cunha. Jamestown on Saint Helena remains the capital.
2009	24 November	The United States cedes six uninhabited islands totaling 0.44 km^{2} (0.17 sq mi) in the Rio Grande river to Mexico and Mexico cedes three uninhabited islands and two bancos totaling 0.27 km^{2} (0.10 sq mi) after pending for 20 years.

== 2010s ==
Year	Date	Event
2010	21 April	Ukraine extends Russia's lease on naval facilities in Sevastopol for an additional twenty-five years beyond the 2017 expiration, until 2042, with further renewal options thereafter.
2010	10 October	The Kingdom of the Netherlands dissolves the Netherlands Antilles. New polities include: The constituent country of Curaçao. Willemstad remains the capital.; The constituent country of Sint Maarten. Philipsburg remains the capital.; Bonaire, Saba, and Sint Eustatius become special municipalities of the Netherlands.
2010	21 October	The Union of Myanmar changes its name to the Republic of the Union of Myanmar.
2011	11 January	Tajikistan cedes 1,322 km^{2} (510 sq mi) of land to China after the final ratification of boundary treaties between the two countries.
2011	2 February	The Republic of the Fiji Islands changes its name back to the Republic of Fiji.
2011	15 March	Unrest in Syria leads to the beginning of the Syrian civil war.
2011	31 March	Implementing the decision of a March 2009 referendum, France incorporates the Departmental collectivity of Mayotte as the Overseas department and region of Mayotte.
2011	9 July	Following a referendum in January, Southern Sudan gains independence from Sudan as the Republic of South Sudan. Juba remains the capital.
2011	1 September	Amidst a civil war, Muammar Gaddafi moves the capital of the Libyan Arab Jamahiriya from Tripoli to Sirte, days after the rebel forces of the National Transitional Council, supported by NATO, conquered Tripoli.
2011	16 September	Libya officially supersedes the Great Socialist People's Libyan Arab Jamahiriya, as the United Nations General Assembly seats the representatives of the National Transitional Council and recognizes the country's name change.
2011	20 October	The Libyan Arab Jamahiriya is overthrown following its defeat in the Battle of Sirte. The government of Libya declares the end of the civil war three days later.
2011	18 December	The United States ends its occupation of Iraq.
2011	31 December	Samoa and Tokelau switch to the western side of the International Date Line, skipping 30 December entirely.
2012		Uzbekistan leaves the Collective Security Treaty Organisation for a second time after rejoining the alliance in 2006.
2012	1 January	The Republic of Hungary changes its name to Hungary.
2012	25 January	The National Movement for the Liberation of Azawad (MNLA) conquers Aguelhok, the first town to fall under the control of the militant separatist group in northern Mali.
2012	6 April	The State of Azawad declares independence from Mali, after the MNLA conquers northern Mali's largest cities between 30 March and 2 April. Timbuktu is proclaimed the capital; Gao serves as the provisional capital.
2012	26 May	Georgia moves its legislative capital from Tbilisi to Kutaisi. Tbilisi remains the administrative capital.
2012	15 June	A standoff beginning 8 April over Scarborough Shoal ends with an agreement between China and the Philippines to both withdraw their forces: only the Philippines actually does so, leaving China in effective possession.
2012	12 July	Ansongo, the last town controlled by the State of Azawad, is conquered by Ansar Dine, a militant group aiming to make Mali an Islamist state which had already conquered Azawad's largest cities on 27–28 June.
2012	20 August	The Somali Republic changes its name to the Federal Republic of Somalia.
2012	19 November	The ICJ resolves the territorial dispute between Nicaragua and Colombia, upholding Colombia's sovereignty over disputed islands while ceding Nicaragua much of the surrounding maritime territory.
2012	29 November	The United Nations General Assembly votes to upgrade the status of the State of Palestine from "entity" to "non-member observer state," effectively granting it recognition.
2012	14 December	China declares an exclusive economic zone in the East China Sea which extends hundreds of kilometers into Japan's maritime claims.
2013	5 January	After its United Nations recognition, the Palestinian National Authority changes its name to the State of Palestine. Jerusalem remains its claimed capital and Ramallah also remains its administrative center.
2013	8 January	The General National Congress changes the provisional name of Libya to the State of Libya, pending the adoption of a new constitution.
2013	1 July	Croatia joins the European Union.
2013	24 October	The Republic of Cape Verde changes its official English name to the Republic of Cabo Verde, following precedents set by Côte d'Ivoire and Timor-Leste.
2013	11 November	The ICJ clarifies its 1962 ruling on the disputed border between Cambodia and Thailand, awarding the promontory of Preah Vihear to Cambodia and Phu Ma-khuea hill to Thailand.
2013	23 November	China declares an Air Defense Identification Zone over the East China Sea, around half of which overlaps with the previously declared airspace of Japan, South Korea, and Taiwan.
2014	4 January	ISIS captures Fallujah in Iraq, the first significant city the militant group is able to maintain control over.
2014	14 January	After having been expelled from the city by Syrian rebels early in the month, ISIS seizes total control of Raqqa, the largest city to fall under its rule in Syria.
2014	27 January	The ICJ publishes a new boundary resolving the maritime dispute between Chile and Peru.
2014	27 February	Russia begins occupying Crimea in Ukraine.
2014	17 March	The Republic of Crimea declares independence from Ukraine following a disputed referendum. Sevastopol and Simferopol are the de facto capitals.
2014	18 March	The Republic of Crimea is annexed by Russia as two separate federal entities: the Republic of Crimea and the federal city of Sevastopol. Most countries continue to recognize Crimea as part of Ukraine.
2014	26 March	The annexation of Crimea by Russia is completed.
2014	12 April	Serbia and Afghanistan become observer states to the Collective Security Treaty Organization.
2014	11 May	The Donetsk People's Republic and Luhansk People's Republic declare independence from Ukraine following referendums. Donetsk and Luhansk become their capitals.
2014	16 May	The Second Libyan Civil War begins as General Khalifa Haftar launches "Operation Dignity" against Islamist militias and jihadists in Benghazi, leading to a power struggle between the House of Representatives and the Government of National Accord.
2014	10 June	ISIS completely conquers Mosul, the second largest city in Iraq.
2014	29 June	Abu Bakr al-Baghdadi, the leader of the ISIS, declares the foundation of a new caliphate, the Islamic State. Raqqa is the de facto capital.
2014	16 September	A civil war begins in Yemen, as Houthi insurgents take the capital of Sanaa and quickly seize control of the government.
2015	20 February	The Donetsk People's Republic and Luhansk People's Republic consolidate their territories with the conquest of Debaltseve from Ukraine, the last major battle of the war in Donbas.
2015	21 March	Amidst a civil war, the Cabinet of Yemen provisionally moves the capital of Yemen to Aden, while the Supreme Political Council remains in the official capital of Sanaa.
2015	8 May	Burkina Faso and Niger agree to implement the ICJ's 2013 judgment on their frontier dispute case by exchanging 18 towns over the following year (Burkina Faso to gain 14, Niger to gain 4).
2015	31 July	India and Bangladesh exchange 162 enclaves, simplifying their mutual border in the region of the former Cooch Behar princely state; Bangladesh gains a net 40 km^{2} (15 sq mi).
2015	26 August	Syria formally agrees to lease its Khmeimim Air Base to Russia with no time limit.
2015	11 December	The Republic of The Gambia changes its name to the Islamic Republic of The Gambia by presidential decree.
2015	16 December	The ICJ cedes 3 km^{2} (1.2 sq mi) to Costa Rica, resolving part of the San Juan River border dispute with Nicaragua.
2016	17 March	Kurdish held areas in North-eastern Syria declare the establishment of an autonomous federal government called the Democratic Federation of Rojava – Northern Syria or Rojava.
2016	5 April	After four days of fighting, Azerbaijan reconquers 8–20 km^{2} (3.1–7.7 sq mi) of territory controlled by the Nagorno-Karabakh Republic since 1994.
2016	2 May	The Czech Republic changes its official English short-form name to Czechia.
2016	1 July	Australia incorporates Norfolk Island within its domestic institutions and laws, implementing a March 2015 decision to revoke the territory's self-governing status.
2017	18 January	Syria's lease of Khmeimim Air Base to Russia is amended from having no time limit to 49 years, renewable for subsequent 25-year periods beginning in 2066.
2017	18 January	Syria signs a lease granting Russia sovereign jurisdiction over the naval base at the port of Tartus for 49 years, renewable for subsequent 25-year periods beginning in 2066.
2017	19 January	Military forces of Senegal, Ghana, Mali, Togo, and Nigeria, members of the ECOWAS group, launch an invasion of The Gambia to enforce the results of the 2016 Gambian presidential election.
2017	29 January	The Islamic Republic of The Gambia changes its name back to the Republic of The Gambia.
2017	21 February	The unrecognized Nagorno-Karabakh Republic changes its name to the Republic of Artsakh after a constitutional referendum.
2017	29 March	Turkey and the Turkish-backed Syrian National Army complete the conquest of a 2,055 km^{2} (793 sq mi) occupation zone from the Islamic State and the Syrian Democratic Forces, establishing the Northern Syria Security Belt.
2017	9 April	Following a referendum, the partially recognized Republic of South Ossetia changes its name to the Republic of South Ossetia – the State of Alania.
2017	18 May	The United States establishes a 55 km (34 mi) radius around Al-Tanf effectively under its control, conducting its only attack on pro-government Syrian ground forces of the Syrian civil war to prevent their advancing into the area.
2017	5 June	Montenegro joins the North Atlantic Treaty Organization in the alliance's seventh enlargement.
2017	24 June	Egypt transfers Sanafir Island and Tiran Island to Saudi Arabia.
2017	20 July	Iraqi government forces, allied militias and the Peshmerga, supported by the US-led Joint Task Force and Iran, complete the reconquest of Mosul from the Islamic State.
2017	10 October	The Generalitat of Catalonia passes a declaration of Independence from Spain which is soon suspended on 30 October of the same year.
2017	16 October	The Iraqi National Army retakes control of Kirkuk from the Kurdistan Regional Government.
2017	17 October	The Syrian Democratic Forces, supported by the US-led Joint Task Force, complete the reconquest of Raqqa from the Islamic State.
2018	1 January	Belgium and the Netherlands exchange territory along the Meuse River, swapping Belgian Presqu'ile de L'llal and Presqu'ile d'Eijsden for Dutch Presqu'ile Petit-Gravier; the Netherlands gains a net 0.1 km^{2} (0.039 sq mi).
2018	2 February	The ICJ awards the Laguna Los Portillos and its barrier beach to Nicaragua and the remainder of the disputed territory on Isla Portillos to Costa Rica.
2018	24 March	Turkey and the Turkish-backed Syrian National Army complete the conquest from the Kurdish People's Protection Units of over 2,000 km^{2} (770 sq mi) of Afrin, which is added to their Northern Syria Security Belt.
2018	19 April	The Kingdom of Swaziland changes its name to the Kingdom of Eswatini.
2018	30 April	The United Arab Emirates occupy the Yemeni archipelago of Socotra, amidst an ongoing civil war.
2018	14 May	The United Arab Emirates return control of the occupied Socotra archipelago to Yemen, amidst an ongoing civil war.
2018	9 July	Ethiopia ends its occupation of Badme and returns the town to Eritrea following a peace summit, ending their twenty-year border conflict.
2018	6 September	The Democratic Federation of Rojava – Northern Syria changes its name to the Democratic Autonomous Administration of North and East Syria.
2018	16 December	Georgia moves its legislative capital from Kutaisi back to Tbilisi.
2019	16 January	Burundi moves its capital from Bujumbura to Gitega.
2019	12 February	The Republic of Macedonia changes its official and constitutional name to the Republic of North Macedonia as part of the Prespa agreement (2018), under which Greece will no longer veto the country's accession to NATO and the EU.
2019	23 March	Kazakhstan changes the name of its capital from Astana to Nur-Sultan.
2019	23 March	The Syrian Democratic Forces, supported by the US-led Joint Task Force and the Iraqi and Syrian governments, conquers the last territory controlled by the Islamic State in Syria or Iraq, though it continues as an insurgency.
2019	29 October	Turkey and the Turkish-backed Syrian National Army complete the conquest from the predominantly-Kurdish Syrian Democratic Forces of a 4,820 km^{2} (1,860 sq mi) "safe zone", expanding their Northern Syria Security Belt.
2019	27 November	Turkey and the Libyan Government of National Accord sign a maritime boundary treaty, establishing exclusive economic zones which are rejected by Cyprus, Egypt, France, Greece, and the United Arab Emirates.

== 2020s ==
Year	Date	Event
2020	31 January	The United Kingdom withdraws from the European Union, entering a transition period in which it continues under EU laws and institutions until 31 December.
2020	27 March	North Macedonia joins the North Atlantic Treaty Organization in the alliance's eighth enlargement.
2020	6 August	Egypt and Greece sign a maritime boundary treaty, establishing exclusive economic zones in the Mediterranean Sea which overlap with the claims made by Libya and Turkey in November 2019.
2020	23 October	The Second Libyan Civil War officially ends with a nationwide ceasefire agreement brokered by the United Nations between the warring factions.
2020	27 September	Beginning of the Second Nagorno-Karabakh War between Azerbaijan, Armenia, and the disputed Republic of Artsakh.
2020	10 November	Armenia and Azerbaijan impose a ceasefire ending the Second Nagorno-Karabakh War; by 15 December the Republic of Artsakh surrenders over 72% of its territory to Azerbaijan, and Russian forces are deployed to the remainder.
2021	1 February	The Tatmadaw overthrows the elected government of Myanmar after baselessly alleging electoral fraud in the 2020 general election. Military rule is restored after 10 years of civilian rule. Start of mass protests and a civil war.
2021	12 May	Azerbaijani soldiers cross several kilometers into Armenia in the provinces of Syunik and Gerharhunik, occupying about 41 square kilometers (16 sq mi) of Armenian territory.
2021	15 August	The Islamic Republic of Afghanistan collapses, while the Islamic Emirate of Afghanistan governed by the Taliban restores its power in Kabul, ending the 2001–2021 War in Afghanistan. Fifteen days later, the United States Armed Forces complete their withdrawal from the country.
2021	12 October	The International Court of Justice rules in favor of Somalia in its dispute with Kenya over their maritime border. Kenya does not recognize the ruling.
2021	3 November	Qatar and Saudi Arabia demarcate their border, expanding Qatar's territory to include the southern shore of the Khor Al Adaid.
2021	30 November	Barbados becomes a republic, abolishing its monarchy and ceasing to be a Commonwealth realm, but still remaining a part of the Commonwealth of Nations.
2021	1 December	Kyrgyzstan and Uzbekistan sign a border agreement, swapping the Andijan Reservoir with 13,868 ha (34,270 acres) of Uzbek border lands.
2022	21 February	Russia recognizes the independence of the Donetsk People's Republic and Luhansk People's Republic from Ukraine, the first UN member to do so. Most countries continue to recognize these territories as part of Ukraine.
2022	24 February	Russia launches a full-scale invasion of Ukraine.
2022	31 May	The Republic of Turkey changes its official English name to the Republic of Türkiye.
2022	11 June	Denmark and Canada agree to partition the disputed Hans Island, following negotiations. Both sovereign states cease to be single land border sovereign states while Greenland gains its first land border.
2022	26 August	Russian peacekeepers leave the Lachin corridor. Azerbaijan regains control of Zabukh, Sus, and Lachin.
2022	17 September	Kazakhstan changes the name of its capital from Nur-Sultan back to Astana.
2022	22 September	A series of border clashes break out between Azerbaijan and Armenia that last until 24 September. Azerbaijan occupies multiple strategic heights in the border area inside Armenia.
2022	29 September	Russia recognizes the independence of Kherson Oblast and Zaporizhzhia Oblast from Ukraine as a precursor to annexation.
2022	30 September	The occupied Ukrainian territories of the Kherson Oblast, Zaporizhzhia Oblast, Donetsk Oblast, and Luhansk Oblast, including the mostly unrecognized Donetsk People's Republic and Luhansk People's Republic, are annexed by Russia following disputed referendums that the United Nations have deemed illegal under international law. At the time of annexation, Russia did not control all of the territory that it claimed, with significant portions remaining under Ukrainian control.
2022	11 October	Israel reaches an agreement with Lebanon on a US-brokered deal solving a dispute over their maritime boundaries.
2023	4 April	Finland joins the North Atlantic Treaty Organization in the alliance's ninth enlargement.
2023	15 April	A civil war breaks out in Sudan between the Sudanese Armed Forces and the Rapid Support Forces.
2023	7 May	Syria is readmitted to the Arab League after being suspended since 2011.
2023	20 September	The unrecognized Republic of Artsakh begins negotiations to reintegrate into Azerbaijan after a renewed military offensive.
2023	7 October	Palestinian militant groups led by Hamas launch a large-scale invasion and offensive against Israel from the Gaza Strip, triggering the Gaza war.
2023	27 October	Israel launches a counter-invasion of the Gaza Strip.
2024	1 January	The Republic of Artsakh is dissolved and reintegrates into Azerbaijan. Stepanakert yields to Baku as the capital.
2024	7 March	Sweden joins the North Atlantic Treaty Organization in the alliance's tenth enlargement.
2024	1 April	Puntland announces that it will temporarily operate as a functionally independent state from Somalia amid a dispute over Somali constitutional changes. Garoowe is the capital.
2024	19 April	Armenia cedes four abandoned villages along the border with Azerbaijan: Bağanıs Ayrım, Aşağı Əskipara, Xeyrimli, and Qızılhacılı.
2024	6 July	Following a series of military coups in Mali (2020 and 2021), Burkina Faso (January and September 2022) and Niger (2023), the three countries enter a confederation, forming the Alliance of Sahel States.
2024	1 October	Israel launches an invasion of southern Lebanon in an escalation of the conflict between Israel and Hezbollah.
2024	17 October	The Democratic People's Republic of Korea amends its constitution and unofficially gives up the claims to the southern part of the peninsula while de facto recognizing the existence of the Republic of Korea as a "hostile state" after it was decided in January 2024 that it no longer seeks peaceful reunification of the country.
2024	27 November	Syrian opposition groups launch a major offensive, the first major offensive in the Syrian Civil War since the March 2020 Idlib ceasefire.
2024	8 December	The Syrian Arab Republic collapses after the Syrian opposition capture the capital city of Damascus.
2024	8 December	Israel launches an incursion into the Syrian Golan Heights, marking its first invasion into a part of Syria since the Yom Kippur War.
2025	13 March	Kyrgyzstan and Tajikistan agree to make the Tort-Kocho road, which connects the Tajikistani Vorukh exclave to the rest of Tajikistan, a condominium.
2025	20 March	Niger withdraws from the Multinational Joint Task Force.
2025	19 May	The ICJ rules on the territorial dispute between Gabon and Equatorial Guinea, awarding Equatorial Guinea the islands of Mbanié, Cocoteros, and Conga.
2025	8 August	Armenia and Azerbaijan sign a peace agreement to end the Nagorno-Karabakh conflict. Included is a plan to establish the Zangezur corridor between Azerbaijan and its Nakhchivan exclave through Armenian territory, and granting the United States rights to develop the corridor.
2025	10 October	Israel and Hamas begin a ceasefire agreement as the first stage in the Gaza peace plan.
2025	26 October	Timor-Leste joins ASEAN as the association's eleventh member state.
2025	2 December	The Southern Transitional Council launches an offensive against government forces in southern Yemen, capturing much of the former territory of South Yemen.
2025	16 December	A group of Chagos Islanders based in the United Kingdom declare the Chagossian Government-in-Exile in support of remaining a British territory during the ongoing sovereignty dispute with Mauritius.
2025	26 December	Israel recognizes Somaliland as an independent state, becoming the first country in the world to do so, after 34 years without international recognition.
2025	27 December	The 2025 Cambodian–Thai border crisis resolves after 7 months of on-and-off fighting. Cambodia occupied Huai Tamaria, parts of Emerald Triangle and Hill 745 (Per Thailand). Thailand occupied Prasat Ta Muen Thom, Prasat Ta Kwai, Prasat Khana, several border crossing points such as Chong Ahn Ma, several hills, Phu Makhuea, the villages of Ban Khlong Phaeng, Ban Nong Chan and Ban Nong Ya Kaeo (Chouk Chey and parts of Bueng Takuan according to Cambodia), and partially occupied O Smach town and Thmor Da border region.
2026	2 January	Equatorial Guinea moves its capital from Malabo to Ciudad de la Paz.
2026	3 January	The United States launches strikes on Venezuela, capturing president Nicolás Maduro and first lady Cilia Flores and bringing them to the US to face drugs and weapons charges.
2026	9 January	Following a failed offensive against the Yemeni government, the Southern Transitional Council announces its dissolution.
2026	13 January	Following an offensive against the Syrian Democratic Forces in the territories of the Democratic Autonomous Administration of North and East Syria, Raqqa Governorate and Deir ez-Zor Governorate are ceded to the Syrian transitional government, and the SDF is integrated into the Syrian military. DAANES moves its capital from Ayn Issa to al-Hasakah.
2026	16 February	A group of Chagossians organised as the Chagossian Government sail from Sri Lanka to Île du Coin in the British Indian Ocean Territory, with the aim of establishing a permanent settlement in support of continued British rule.
2026	15 April	Indonesia and Malaysia complete a bilateral land boundary demarcation on Sebatik Island, with Indonesia gaining a net 122.4 hectares.
2026	26 June	The Republic of Nauru changes its official English name to the Republic of Naoero.
2026	20 August	The Democratic Autonomous Administration of North and East Syria is reintegrated into Syria. Al-Hasakah yields to Damascus as the capital.

== See also ==
- Timeline of national independence
- Geopolitics – Study of geography's effects on politics
- List of administrative division name changes
- List of city name changes
- List of national border changes (1914–present)
- Lists of political entities by century
- Sovereign state – State having the highest authority over a territory
  - List of former sovereign states
  - List of sovereign states
  - List of modern sovereign states by date of formation
  - List of sovereign states and dependent territories by continent
- Political history of the world
- Timeline of the Russian invasion of Ukraine
