= Mahammad Hasanov =

Azerbaijani major general

Mahammad Hasanov Məhəmməd Həsənov
- Born: February 25, 1966 (age 60); Aslanbəyli, Qazax District, Azerbaijan SSR, USSR
- Military career
- Allegiance: Azerbaijan
- Azerbaijani Armed Forces: Azerbaijani Land Forces
- Rank: major general
- Conflicts: 2018 Armenian–Azerbaijani clashes Second Nagorno-Karabakh War
- Awards

Mahammad Karim oghlu Hasanov (Azerbaijani: Məhəmməd Kərim oğlu Həsənov, born February 25, 1966) is the Major General of the Azerbaijani Armed Forces; Head of the Heydar Aliyev Military Lyceum of the Nakhchivan Autonomous Republic, Deputy Commander of the Nakhchivan Separate Combined Arms Army; Participant of the Gyunnut operation and the Patriotic War.

== Biography ==
Mahammad Hasanov was born in the village of Aslanbeyli, Qazax District. After finishing his higher education, he started working as a Russian language teacher. In Black January, he was an active participant in the protest demonstration against the Soviet Union and managed to survive under the tank at the last moment. When the Karabakh war started, he voluntarily went to the front and took part in heavy battles and received several shrapnel wounds.

== Military Service ==
After the war, he remained in military service and did important work in the construction of the army. He was a participant in many operations that were not disclosed in the press. He served as a military unit commander and other important positions. In April 2019, Colonel Mahammad Hasanov was appointed head of the Heydar Aliyev Military Lyceum of the Nakhchivan Autonomous Republic. On November 4, 2021, he was appointed the deputy commander of the Nakhchivan Separate Combined Arms Army.

On June 24, 2019, the President of the Republic of Azerbaijan Ilham Aliyev awarded Colonel Mahammad Karim oglu Hasanov with the highest military rank of Major General.

== Awards ==
- Azerbaijani Flag Order — June 22, 2006
- "For the Fatherland" medal — June 24, 2003
- For Heroism Medal — June 25, 2018
- "For distinction in military service" medal (1st degree)
- "For distinction in military service" medal (2nd degree)
- "For distinction in military service" medal (3rd degree) — June 24, 2014
- "10th Anniversary of the Armed Forces of Azerbaijan (1991-2001)" Medal
- "90th Anniversary of the Armed Forces of Azerbaijan (1918–2008)" Medal
- "95th Anniversary of the Armed Forces of Azerbaijan (1918–2013)" Medal
- Azerbaijani Army 100th anniversary medal
- For Service to the Fatherland Order
