= Aşağı Əskipara =

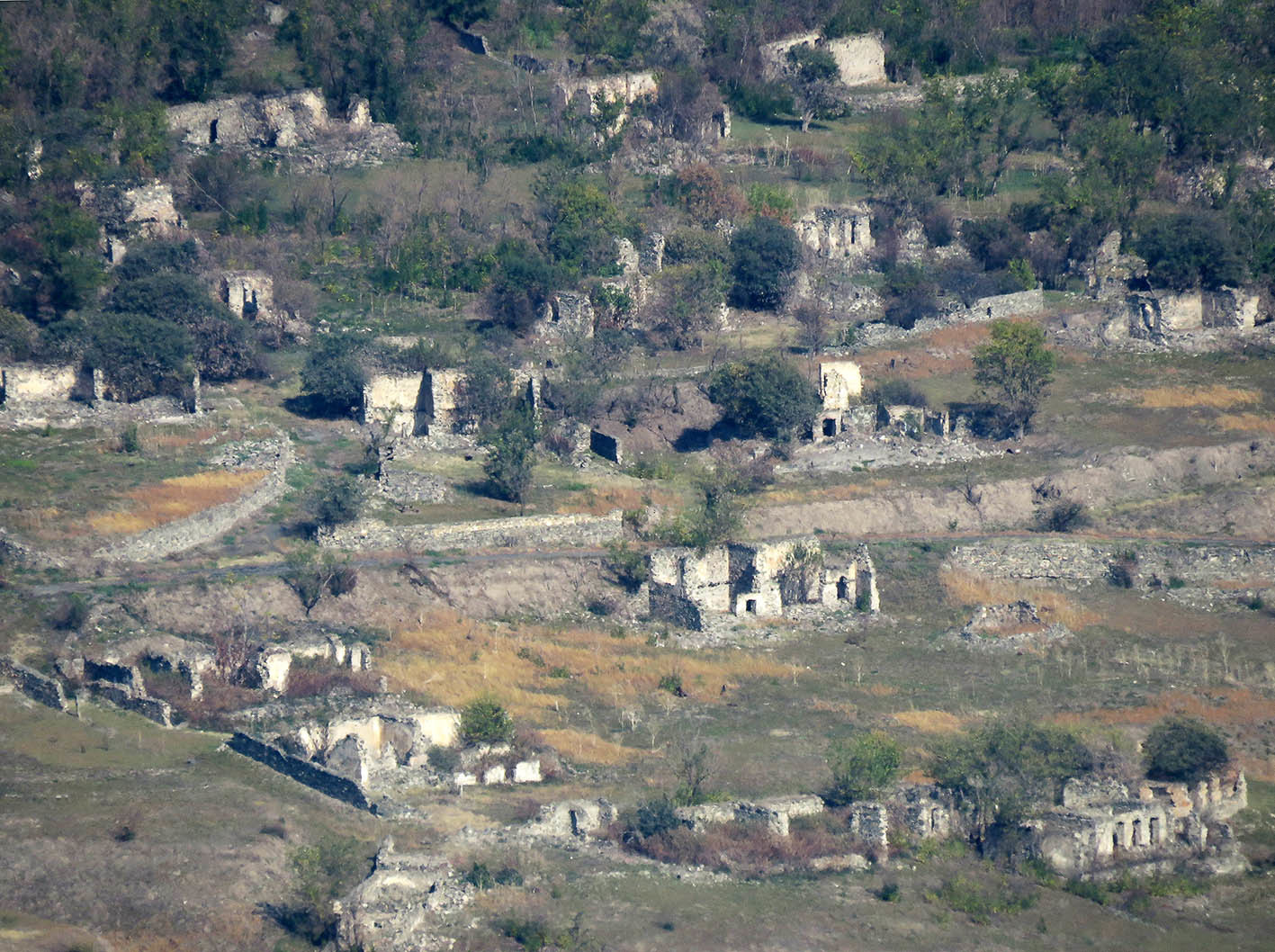
- Interactive map of Aşağı Əskipara
- Location within Azerbaijan
- Coordinates: 41°04′32″N 45°04′58″E
- Country: Azerbaijan
- District: Qazakh

Population (2024)
  - Total: 0
  - Density: 0/km^{2} (0/sq mi)
- Time zone: UTC+4 (AZT)

Aşağı Əskipara (Armenian: Ներքին Ոսկեպար, romanized: Nerkin Voskepar, lit. 'Lower Voskepar') is an abandoned village in the Qazakh District of Azerbaijan.

The village was controlled by Armenia from the First Nagorno-Karabakh War in the early 1990s until 2024, when Armenia agreed to return the village to Azerbaijan. The neighboring settlement of Voskepar is located in Armenia proper. Another nearby village, Yuxarı Əskipara, is located in what is de jure an Azerbaijani exclave within Armenia, but is still controlled by Armenia.

== History ==
In the morning of 19 August 1990, Armenian militants reportedly attacked a bus near the village, resulting in the death of one policeman and the injury of two civilians. The Armenians reportedly shelled the village with artillery later in the day.

According to the Azerbaijani defense ministry, an Armenian "sabotage group" attacked Azerbaijani positions in the area on 5 June 2012, resulting in the death of four Azerbaijani troops.

In March 2024, Armenian Prime Minister Nikol Pashinyan said he was willing to unilaterally return Lower Askipara and the three other Armenian-controlled non-enclaves (Bağanis Ayrum, Qızılhacılı, and Xeyrimli). On 19 April 2024, Armenia agreed to hand over the villages to Azerbaijan, which happened on 24 May 2024.

== Demographics ==
According to the 1915 publication of the Caucasian Calendar, the village (Аксибара татар, Aksibara tatar) had a predominantly Tatar (later known as Azerbaijani) population of 933 in 1914.
