= Canalı =

- Municipality
- Location within Azerbaijan
- Coordinates: 41°07′N 45°21′E
- Country: Azerbaijan
- Rayon: Qazakh

Population
  - Total: 1,472
- Time zone: UTC+4 (AZT)
  - Summer (DST): UTC+5 (AZT)

Canalı (also, Canallı and Dzhanally) is a village and municipality in the Qazakh Rayon of Azerbaijan. It has a population of 1,472.
