= Goyazan =

Goyazan may refer to:

- Mount Goyazan
- Göyazan Qazakh FK
