= Əzizbəyli =

- Location within Azerbaijan
- Coordinates: 41°07′03″N 45°21′43″E
- Country: Azerbaijan
- Rayon: Qazakh
- Time zone: UTC+4 (AZT)
  - Summer (DST): UTC+5 (AZT)

Əzizbəyli (also known as Azizbeyli and Azizbeyly) is a village in the Qazakh Rayon of Azerbaijan.
