= Mount Goyazan =

Mountain in Azerbaijan

Coordinates: 41°05′19″N 45°11′05″E

Mount Goyazan (Azerbaijani: Göyəzən dağı) is a mountain located 20 kilometres from the northwestern Qazakh District of Azerbaijan. It is located in the vicinity of the villages Abbasbeyli and Alpout, and rises 858 metres above sea level. Ruins of a Goyazan fortress from the 14th century were found near the mountain. Mount Goyazan's geological origins are linked to volcanic activity around 60-65 million years ago. Its summit hosts the ruins of the 14th century Goyazan Fortress, and archaeological excavations have revealed remains of an Albanian Christian temple and necropolis, highlighting the site's Early Medieval significance. The mountain is part of the Avey State Historical and Cultural Reserve and is valued for archaeological, ecological, and adventure tourism, combining natural beauty with historical importance. Residents in the surrounding area believe it is the center of the world. In times of danger, a fire would be lit on its peak.

== See also ==
- Qazakh Rayon
- Tourism in Azerbaijan
