= Ağköynək =

- Municipality
- Location within Azerbaijan
- Coordinates: 41°04′01″N 45°17′44″E
- Country: Azerbaijan
- Rayon: Qazakh

Population
  - Total: 3,272
- Time zone: UTC+4 (AZT)
  - Summer (DST): UTC+5 (AZT)

Ağköynək (also, Agkeynak and Ağ Köynək) is a village and municipality in the Qazakh Rayon of Azerbaijan. It has a population of 3,272.

== Notable natives ==
- Shamoy Chobanov — National Hero of Azerbaijan.
