= Ömərağalı =

- Location within Azerbaijan
- Coordinates: 41°16′48″N 45°12′14″E
- Country: Azerbaijan
- Rayon: Qazakh
- Time zone: UTC+4 (AZT)
  - Summer (DST): UTC+5 (AZT)

Ömərağalı (also known as Omarağalı and Omaragaly) is a small settlement in the Qazakh District of Azerbaijan.
