= Marifat Nasibov =

National Hero of Azerbaijan

- Born: May 22, 1972; Qazakh District, Azerbaijan
- Died: January 28, 1992 (aged 19); Quşçu Ayrım, Qazakh District, Azerbaijan
- Military career
- Allegiance: Republic of Azerbaijan
- Service years: 1991-1992
- Conflicts: First Nagorno-Karabakh War
- Awards: National Hero of Azerbaijan; 1992

Marifat Nasibov (Azerbaijani: Nəsibov Mərifət Əhməd oğlu) (May 22, 1972, Qazakh District, Azerbaijan – January 28, 1992, Quşçu Ayrım, Qazakh District, Azerbaijan ) was the National Hero of Azerbaijan, and the warrior of the Karabakh war.

== Biography ==
Marifat Nasibov was born on 22 May 1972 in Mazam village of Qazakh District. He studied at the village school of Qazakh District in 1979–1989. He was called up to the military service in 1990. After completing his military service in the Soviet Army, he returned to Azerbaijan. Marifat went to the front line as a volunteer.

== Military career ==
At the end of 1991, he went to the frontline as a volunteer. He was one of the bravest soldiers in his battalion. Marifat participated in battles around the villages of Qazakh District. He died in a battle around the village of Qushchu Ayrım in Qazakh District.

== Memorial ==
He was posthumously awarded the title of "National Hero of Azerbaijan" by Presidential Decree No. 833 dated 7 June 1992.

There was a fountain named after him in the park named after Heydar Aliyev in Qazakh District. In 2013, a documentary entitled “The nest of an Eagle” released. The documentary looks into memorials surrounding the lives and battlefields of Marifat Nasibov as well as two other National Heroes of Azerbaijan; Rafig Alikhanov and Shamoy Chobanov from Qazakh District.

== See also ==
- First Nagorno-Karabakh War
- List of National Heroes of Azerbaijan

== Sources ==
- Vugar Asgarov. Azərbaycanın Milli Qəhrəmanları (Yenidən işlənmiş II nəşr). Bakı: "Dərələyəz-M", 2010, səh. 227.
