= Abbasbəyli =

- Location within Azerbaijan
- Coordinates: 41°04′57″N 45°11′36″E
- Country: Azerbaijan
- Rayon: Qazakh
- Time zone: UTC+4 (AZT)
  - Summer (DST): UTC+5 (AZT)

Abbasbəyli (also, Abbasbeyli) is a village in the Qazakh Rayon of Azerbaijan.
