= Məzəm =

- Interactive map of Məzəm
- Location within Azerbaijan
- Coordinates: 41°04′06.5″N 45°07′24.2″E
- Country: Azerbaijan
- District: Qazakh
- Time zone: UTC+4 (AZT)
  - Summer (DST): UTC+5 (AZT)

Məzəm (Mazam; known as Mazamlı until 2000) is a village in the Qazakh District of Azerbaijan.
