= Baba Mahmudoghlu =

Baba Mahmudoghlu Baba Mahmudoğlu
- Born: November 7, 1940; Gazakh, Azerbaijan SSR, USSR
- Died: December 6, 2006 (aged 66) Baku, Azerbaijan
- Occupation: singer

Baba Mahmud oghlu Mirzoyev (Azerbaijani: Baba Mahmud oğlu Mirzəyev, November 7, 1940 – December 6, 2006) was an Azerbaijani singer, People's Artiste of Azerbaijan (1992).

== Biography ==
Baba Mahmudoghlu was born on November 7, 1940, in Gazakh. In 1956–1961, he studied at the Azerbaijan Oil and Chemistry Institute and started working as an engineer. In 1967, he entered the Azerbaijan State Institute of Arts.

In 1962, Baba Mahmudoghlu, who started working as an intern at the Azerbaijan State Academic Opera and Ballet Theater, later became a soloist of the mugham section of this theater. In the fall of 2005, he retired from the theater.

Until 1979, everyone knew him as the singer Baba Mirzoyev. In September 1979, he created his own folklore ensemble, "Dastan" and from that moment began to perform as Baba Mahmudoglu. He toured Turkey, Nepal, Bangladesh, India, Algeria, Tunisia, Zambia, Norway, Austria, Belgium, Luxembourg, Germany, and Iran with the "Dastan" folklore ensemble.

On December 6, 2006, Baba Mirzoyev died at the age of 66 in Baku.

== Awards ==
- People's Artiste of Azerbaijan — November 18, 1992
- Honored Artist of the Azerbaijan SSR — 1982
