= Alpout, Bilasuvar =

Alpout
- Location within Azerbaijan
- Coordinates: 39°33′39″N 48°11′21″E
- Country: Azerbaijan
- Rayon: Bilasuvar
- Time zone: UTC+4 (AZT)

Alpout is a village in the Bilasuvar Rayon of Azerbaijan.
