= Alpout (Bijo) =

- Location within Azerbaijan
- Coordinates: 40°33′13″N 48°34′09″E
- Country: Azerbaijan
- Rayon: Agsu
- Time zone: UTC+4 (AZT)
  - Summer (DST): UTC+5 (AZT)

Alpout (also, Alpaut) was a village in the current territory of Agsu Rayon of Azerbaijan. Nowadays, it is in the territory of the Bijo village in the same region.
