= Yukhari Askipara =

Abandoned village and exclave of Azerbaijan

Yukhari Askipara: Yuxarı Əskipara (Azerbaijani); Վերին Ոսկեպար (Armenian)
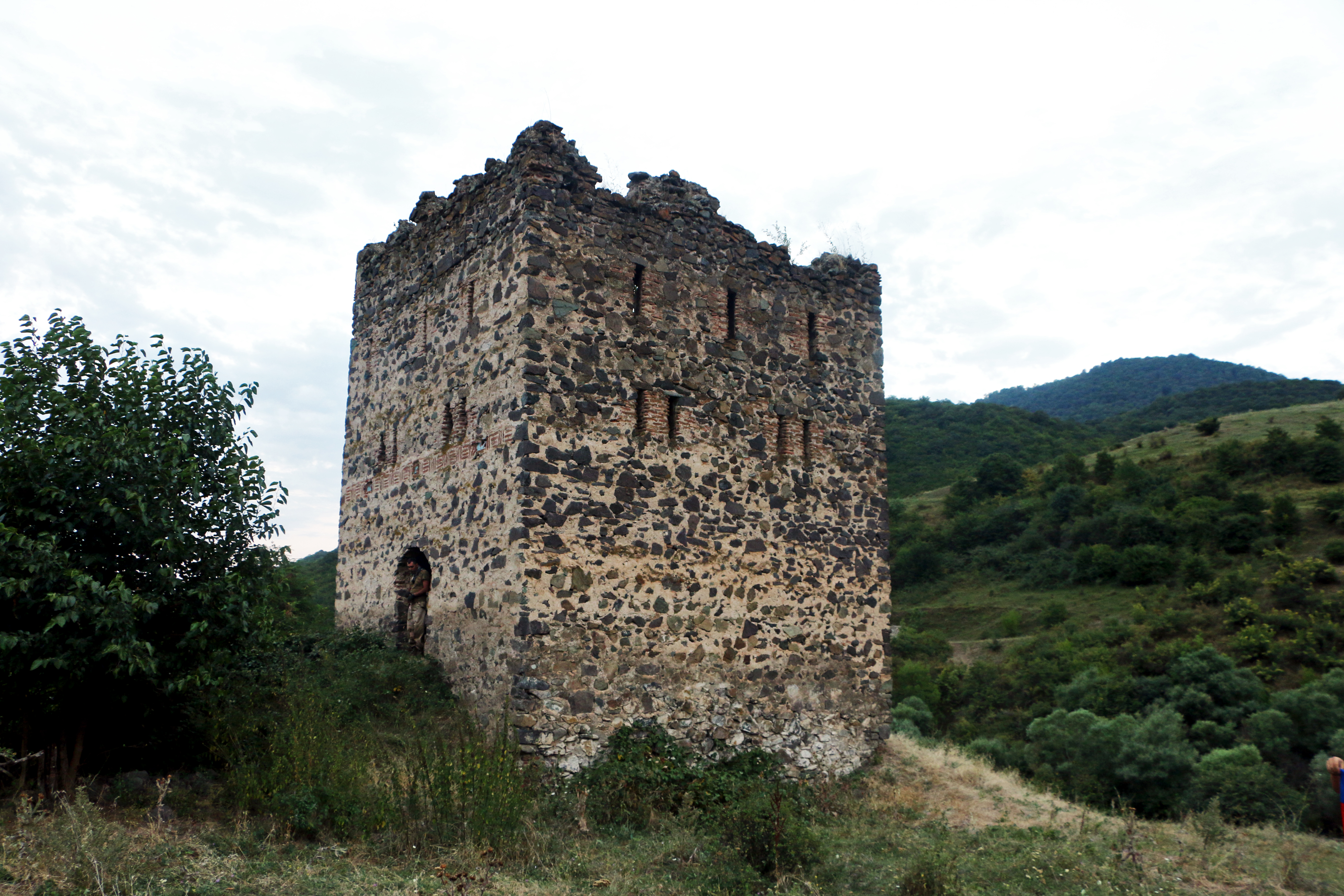
- Remains of a fortress tower in Yukhari Askipara

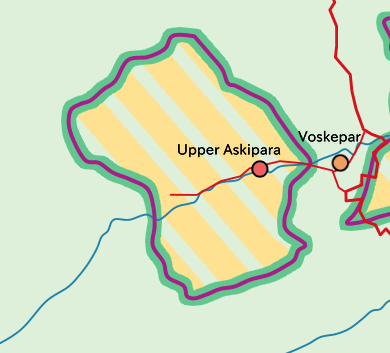

- Location within Azerbaijan
- Coordinates: 41°03′58″N 45°01′24″E
- Country (de jure): Azerbaijan
  - District: Gazakh
- Country (de facto): Armenia
  - Province: Tavush
  - Municipality: Ijevan
- Time zone: UTC+4 (AZT)

Yukhari Askipara (Azerbaijani: Yuxarı Əskipara, lit. 'Upper Askipara'), also known as Verin Voskepar (Armenian: Վերին Ոսկեպար, lit. 'Upper Voskepar'), is an abandoned village in an exclave of the Gazakh District of Azerbaijan. It is surrounded by Armenia's Tavush Province and has been occupied by Armenia since 1992, when it was captured and destroyed by Armenian troops in the First Nagorno-Karabakh War. Armenia agreed to return control over Yukhari Askipara and six other villages to Azerbaijan as part of the ceasefire agreement that ended the Second Nagorno-Karabakh War, but this has yet to be done.

== History ==
According to the 1915 publication of the Kavkazskiy kalendar (Caucasian calendar), Yukhari Askipara (Russian: Аксибара Стар, romanized: Aksibara Star) had a predominantly Tatar (later known as Azerbaijani) population of 278 residents in 1914.

Prior to the First Nagorno-Karabakh War (1988–1994), the village was home to 500 Azerbaijani residents from 100 families. It was captured and destroyed by Armenian soldiers in 1992, and its population was expelled to other parts of Azerbaijan's Gazakh District. The village has since been administered as part of Armenia's Tavush Province, which completely surrounds it.

In 2004, three medieval bridges, a fortress, and the ruins of a church remained standing in the village.

Yukhari Askipara was one of seven villages that Armenia promised to return to Azerbaijani control in the original terms of the trilateral ceasefire agreement which ended the Second Nagorno-Karabakh War (2020). However, Russian officials omitted this detail in their later communications regarding the agreement. Nonetheless, in 2024, Armenian prime minister Nikol Pashinyan publicly reiterated Azerbaijan's sovereignty over the seven villages, saying they were not part of Armenian territory in the present day nor in Soviet times.

== Notable people ==
Firudin Musayev was a locally-born Soviet politician and soldier who rose from a peasant background to become a brigadier in the Red Army, then a state farm director before becoming a deputy of the 8th convocation of the Supreme Soviet of the Soviet Union.
