= Quşçu Ayrım =

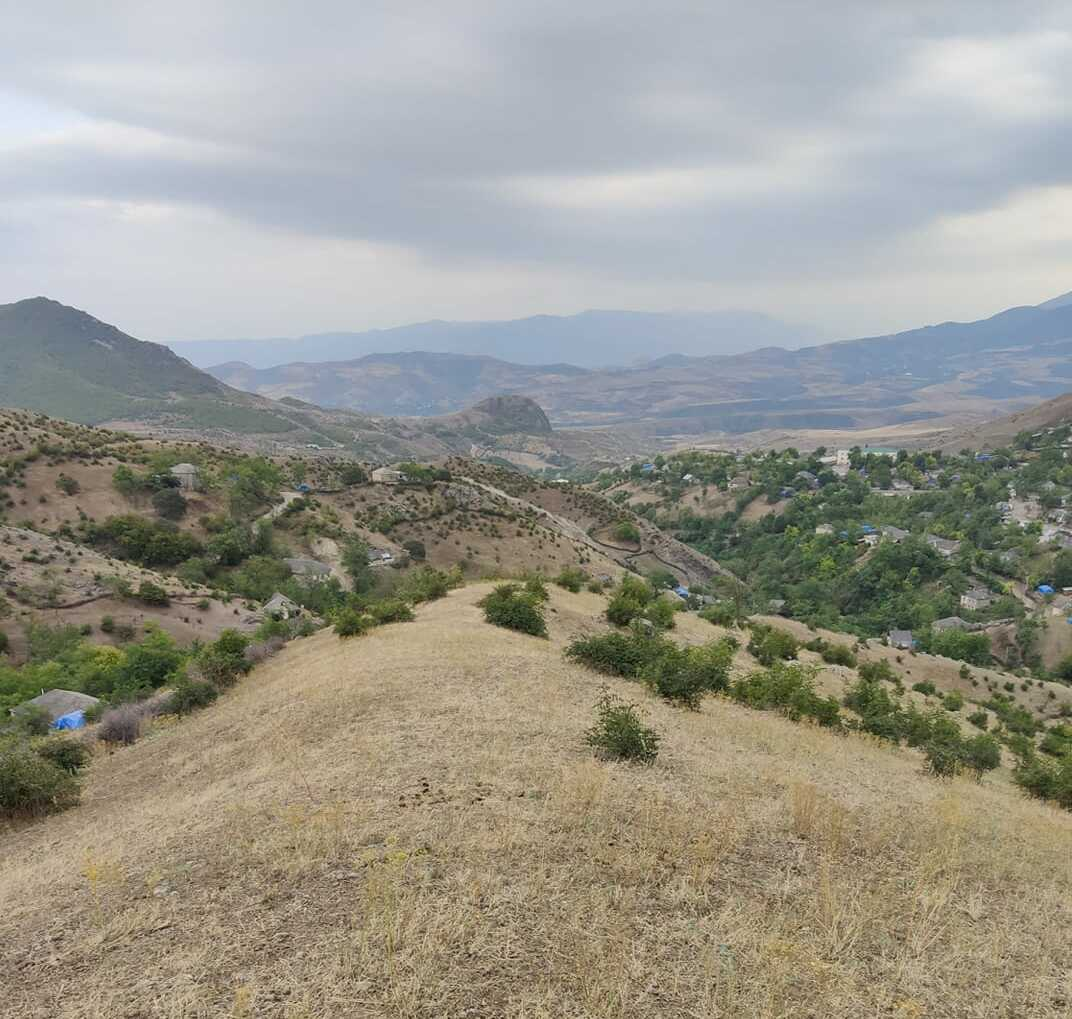

- Location within Azerbaijan
- Coordinates: 41°05′15″N 45°05′55″E
- Country: Azerbaijan
- District: Qazakh
- Time zone: UTC+4 (AZT)

Quşçu Ayrım (Gushchu Ayrim) is a village in the Qazakh District of Azerbaijan.
