= Alpout, Goranboy =

Alpout
- Municipality
- Location within Azerbaijan
- Coordinates: 40°44′57″N 46°32′04″E
- Country: Azerbaijan
- Rayon: Goranboy

Population
  - Total: 1,070
- Time zone: UTC+4 (AZT)
  - Summer (DST): UTC+5 (AZT)

Alpout (also, Alpouç and Alpaud) is a village and municipality in the Goranboy Rayon of Azerbaijan. It has a population of 1,070.
