= Alpout, Lachin =

Alpout
- Location within Azerbaijan Location within East Zangezur Economic Region
- Coordinates: 39°45′19″N 46°22′15″E
- Country: Azerbaijan
- District: Lachin
- Time zone: UTC+4 (AZT)
  - Summer (DST): UTC+5 (AZT)

Alpout (also, Alpaut) is a village in the Lachin District of Azerbaijan.
