= Alpout, Goychay =

Alpout
- Municipality
- Location within Azerbaijan
- Coordinates: 40°29′13″N 47°56′34″E
- Country: Azerbaijan
- Rayon: Goychay

Population
  - Total: 2,065
- Time zone: UTC+4 (AZT)
  - Summer (DST): UTC+5 (AZT)

Alpout (also, Alpaut and Alpouç) is a village and municipality in the Goychay Rayon of Azerbaijan. It has a population of 2,065.
