= Aslanbəyli =

Coordinates: 41°13′58″N 45°10′13″E

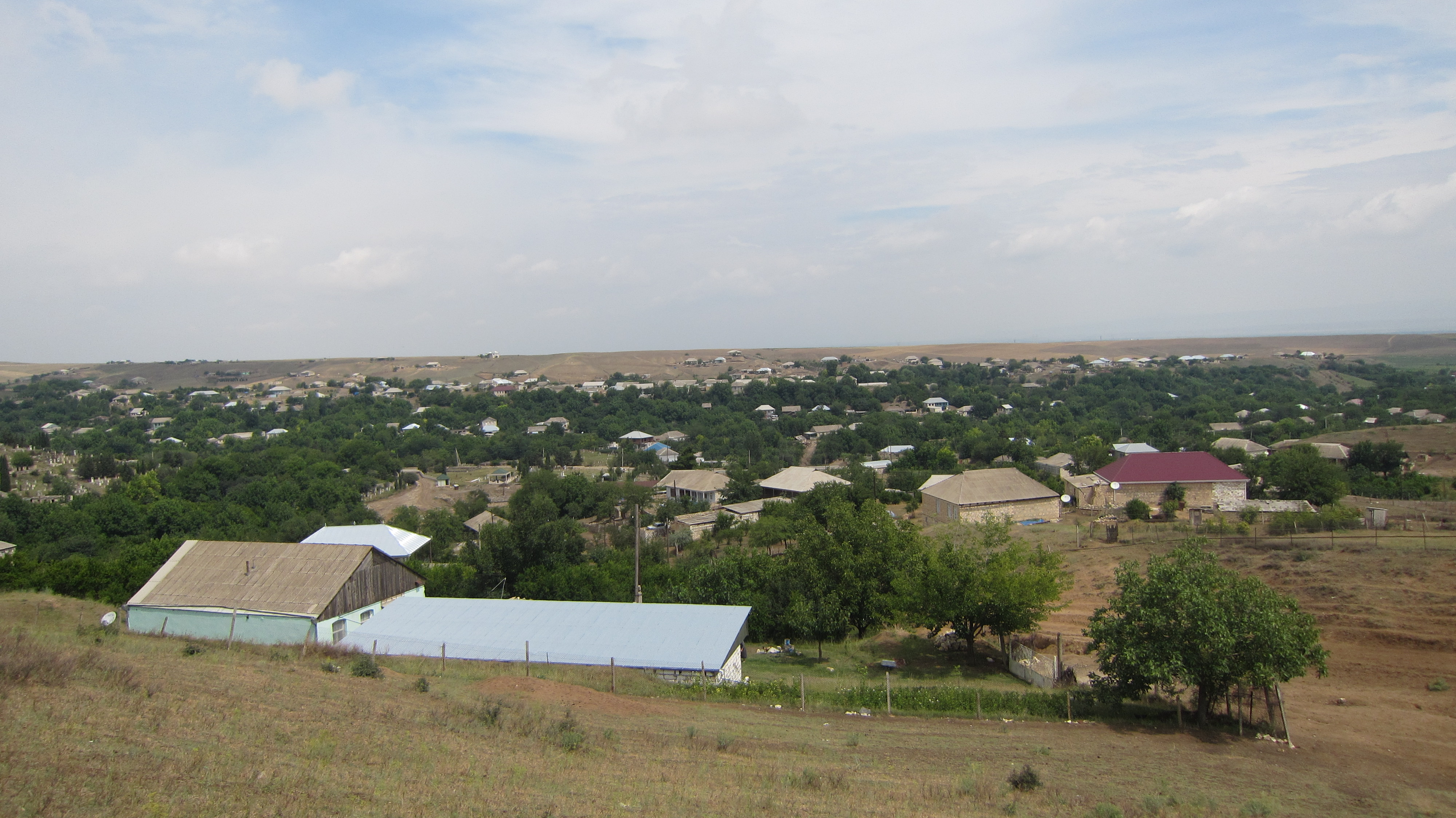

Aslanbəyli is a municipality and village in the Qazakh Rayon of Azerbaijan. It has a population of 3,772.
