= Alpout, Qazax =

Alpout
- Municipality
- Location within Azerbaijan
- Coordinates: 41°05′02″N 45°11′46″E
- Country: Azerbaijan
- Rayon: Qazakh

Population
  - Total: 990
- Time zone: UTC+4 (AZT)
  - Summer (DST): UTC+5 (AZT)

Alpout (also, Alpoud) is a village and the least populous municipality in the Qazakh District of Azerbaijan. It has a population of 990.
