= Qızılhacılı, Qazax =

Qızılhacılı
- Location within Azerbaijan
- Coordinates: 41°04′02″N 45°10′29″E
- Country: Azerbaijan
- District: Qazakh

Population (2024)
  - Total: 0
- Time zone: UTC+4 (AZT)

Qızılhacılı (Gizilhajili) is an abandoned village in the Qazakh District of Azerbaijan.

== History ==
Qızılhacılı was controlled by Armenia and administered as part of its Tavush Province from the First Nagorno-Karabakh War in the early 1990s until 2024.

On 19 April 2024, Armenia agreed to return Qızılhacılı to Azerbaijan, which happened on 24 May.
