= Xeyrimli =

- Location within Azerbaijan
- Coordinates: 41°03′07″N 45°06′34″E
- Country: Azerbaijan
- District: Qazakh

Population (2024)
  - Total: 0
- Time zone: UTC+4 (AZT)

Xeyrimli (Kheyrimli) is an abandoned village in the Qazakh District of Azerbaijan.

== History ==
Xeyrimli was controlled by Armenia and administered as part of its Tavush Province from the First Nagorno-Karabakh War in the early 1990s until 2024.

On 19 April 2024, as part of the border demarcation agreement, Armenia agreed to return Xeyrimli to Azerbaijan, which happened on 24 May 2024.
