= Bağanıs Ayrım =

- Location within Azerbaijan
- Coordinates: 41°05′48″N 45°04′55″E
- Country: Azerbaijan
- District: Qazakh

Population (2024)
  - Total: 0
- Time zone: UTC+4 (AZT)

Bağanıs Ayrım is an abandoned village in the Qazakh District of Azerbaijan. The village was controlled by Armenia from the First Nagorno-Karabakh War in the early 1990s until 2024, when Armenia agreed to return the village to Azerbaijan.

== History ==
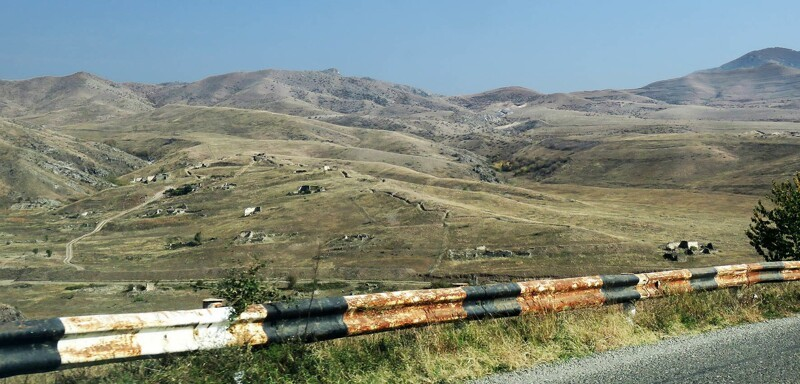
The ruins of Bağanıs Ayrım

On 22 March 1990, Azerbaijani farmers shot at passing trucks and cars with Armenian license plates, wounding several people in a Volga sedan.

In retaliation, four days later, several cars full of Armenians armed with shotguns and assault rifles attacked Bağanıs Ayrım before dawn, setting fire to about 20 houses and killing 8 Azerbaijani civilians. The bodies of one family, including an infant, were reportedly found burnt in the embers of their house. According to Kommersant, eleven inhabitants of the village died during the attack.

On 16 August 1990, a police checkpoint in the village was fired at by two Armenian militiamen driving a Zhiguli car. One of the men, a native of Yerevan, was detained and imprisoned in Ganja. In a phone call between the heads of the Qazakh District and the Noyemberyan District, the latter reportedly threatened that fedayeen would destroy Azeri villages if the prisoner was not released.

On 19 August 1990, the village was reportedly shelled with a variety of heavy weapons by Armenian militants, who took control of it after several hours of fighting, allegedly with the help of reinforcements who had been flown in on helicopters from Yerevan. Azeri control over the village was restored the next day with the assistance of Soviet internal troops under General Yuri Shatalin.

On 19 April 2024, Armenia agreed to return Bağanıs Ayrım to Azerbaijan, which happened on 24 May.
