= Qazax District =

District in northwestern Azerbaijan

Coordinates: 41.0933°N 45.3661°E

- District
- Azerbaijani: Qazax rayonu
- Map of Azerbaijan showing Gazakh District
- Country: Azerbaijan
- Region: Gazakh-Tovuz
- Established: 8 August 1930
- Capital: Gazakh
- Settlements: 35

Government
  - Governor: Rajab Babashov

Area
  - Total: 700 km^{2} (270 sq mi)

Population (2020)
  - Total: 98,400
  - Density: 140/km^{2} (360/sq mi)
- Time zone: UTC+4 (AZT)
- Postal code: 3500
- Website: qazax-ih.gov.az

Qazax District (Gazakh District; Azerbaijani: Qazax rayonu) is one of the 66 districts of Azerbaijan. Located in the northwest of the country, it belongs to the Gazakh-Tovuz Economic Region. The district borders the district of Aghstafa, and the Tavush Province of Armenia. Its capital and largest city is Gazakh. As of 2020, the district had a population of 98,400.

It has two exclaves inside Armenia, which include the villages of Yukhari Askipara, Barkhudarly, Sofulu. Both of the exclaves and parts of mainland Qazax District (the villages of Baghanis Ayrum, Ashaghi Eskipara, Gyzylhajily, and Kheyrimli) were captured by Armenian forces during the First Nagorno-Karabakh war.

== History ==
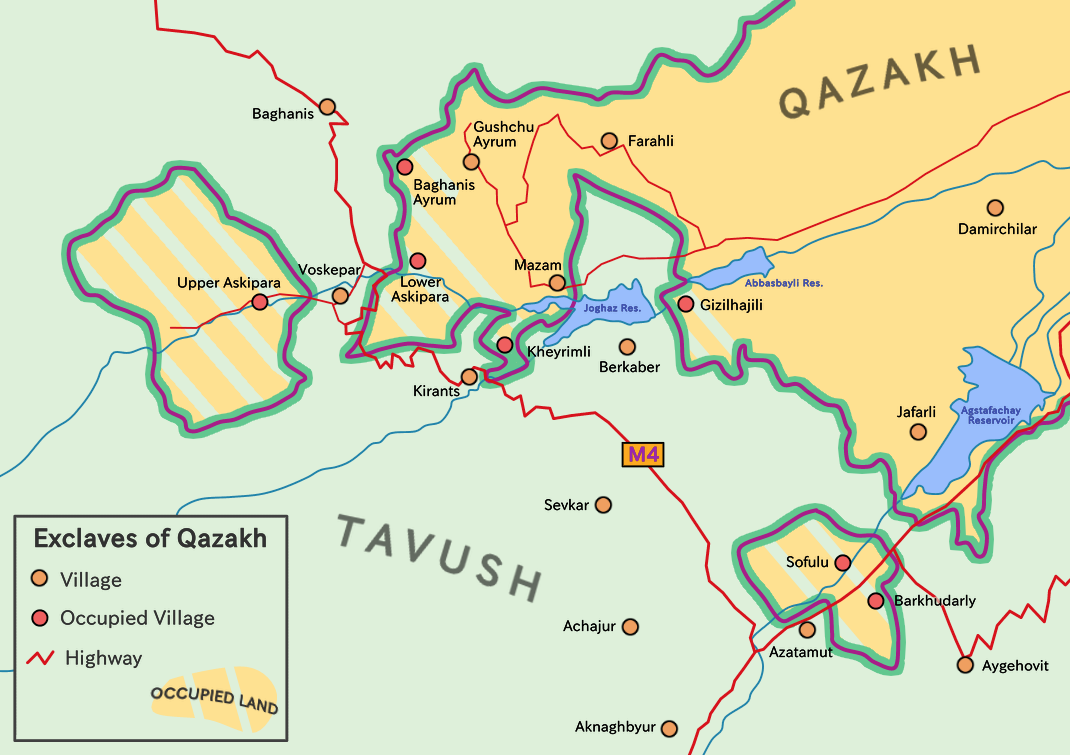
Situation in western Gazakh following the First Nagorno-Karabakh war

The region was conquered by a succession of neighboring powers or invaders, including Armenians, Sassanid Persians, the Byzantine Empire, the Arabs, the Seljuq Turks, the Georgians, the Mongols, the Timurids, the Qara Qoyunlu and Aq Qoyunlu Turkoman tribes, and finally Safavid Iran. It was also ruled by Ottoman Empire between 1578 and 1607 and again 1722 and 1735.

By the end of the XV century, the Kazakh Sultanate was established as a sovereign geopolitical entity in the region. Though it was part of the Karabakh principality during the Safavid Empire, Sultan Shamsaddin of Gazakh was given the rank of Khan by the decree of Abbas the Great in 1605.

After the Russo-Persian War (1804–1813), the Russian Empire gained control of the area by virtue of the Treaty of Gulistan. Under Russian rule, it was part of Tiflis Governorate before forming the northeastern part of the Kazakh Uyezd of the Elisabethpol Governorate in 1868. A contemporary military historian noted the following ethnographic detail: "Abbas Mirza's route lay through the country of the great tribe of the Casaks, which is extremely strong and thickly wooded." He further notes that: "These have no connection with the Russian Cossacks. "

When the South Caucasus came under British occupation, Sir John Oliver Wardrop, British Chief Commissioner in the South Caucasus, decided that assigning the Erivan Governorate and the Kars Oblast to Democratic Republic of Armenia (DRA) and the Elisabethpol and Baku Governorates to the Azerbaijan Democratic Republic (ADR) would solve the region's outstanding disputes. However, this proposal was rejected by both Armenians (who did not wish to give up their claims to Gazakh, Zangezur (today Syunik), and Nagorno-Karabakh) and Azerbaijanis (who did not wish to give up their claims to Nakhchivan). As conflict broke out between the two groups, the British left the region in mid-1919.

=== Nagorno-Karabakh conflict ===
During the First Nagorno-Karabakh War, Armenian troops took control of several villages of the Gazakh District. Several Azerbaijani inhabitants were killed during the war although some of them were able to flee.

In July 2020, Gazakh became a site for clashes with Armenia.

In April 2024, Armenia and Azerbaijan reached an agreement whereby Armenia handed over four abandoned villages within Qazax District to Azerbaijan: Bağanis Ayrum, Aşağı Əskipara, Xeyrimli, and Qızılhacılı.

== Population ==
Population by towns and regions of the Republic of Azerbaijan (at the beginning of the years, thsd. persons)
	2010	2011	2012	2013	2014	2015	2016	2017	2018	2019	2020	2021
Gazakh region	89,9	90,8	91,4	92,0	92,7	93,7	94,7	95,8	96,7	97,6	98,4	98,9
Urban population	20,8	21,0	21,0	21,0	21,0	21,2	21,4	21,6	21,8	21,9	22,0	22,0
Rural population	69,1	69,8	70,4	71,0	71,7	72,5	73,3	74,2	74,9	75,7	76,4	76,9

== List of historic and tourist sites ==
There are 112 protected monuments in the region of Gazakh, of which 54 are archaeological, 46 are architectural, 7 are historical, and 5 are of artistic significance. Historic and tourist sites in this region include:

- The House of the Poet Samad Vurgun in Yukhari Salahli village, since 1976.
- The Museum of History and Ethnography, since 1984.
- The Gazakh State Picture Gallery by the Ministry of Culture of Azerbaijan, since 1986.
- The Memorial museum of Molla Panah Vagif and Molla Vali Vidadi, since 1970.
- The House of Teachers Seminary of Gazakh, built in 1910, functioned between 1918 and 1959.
- The Bath House of Israfil Agha, built in the first decade of the 20th century by Israfil Agha Kerbelayev from the village of Kasaman.
- The Damjili Caves, in the village of Dash Salahli, south-east of the mount Avey, cover an area of 360 km^{2} and refer to Middle and Upper Paleolithic, Mesolithic and Neolithic eras.
- Sining Korpu (The Broken Bridge) (Azerbaijani: Sınıq körpü), a 12th-century bridge built over the Ehram (Khram) river in the village Ikinji Shikhli.
- Didevan Castle (Azerbaijani: Didəvan qalası), a 6th-7th century monument in the village of Khanliglar.
- Mount Goyazan (Azerbaijani: Göyəzən dağı), a rare archaeological monument in the village of Abbasbeyli, rises 857.9 metres above sea level.
- The Baba-Dervish settlement, an archaeological site in the village Demirchiler.
- The Kazim Bridge in the village of Yukhari Askipara, allegedly built during the reign of Shamsi Khan.
- The Juma Mosque of Qazakh, built in 1902 by Akhund Haji Zeynalabdin Mahammadli oghlu from the village of Kasaman.
- The Aslanbeyli Mosque built in 1909 by Hamid Efendi, the native of village Aslanbeyli.
- Santepe, an archaeological site dating to the 9th-8th centuries B.C. and the Iron Age.
- The Gazakhbeyli Hills, an archaeological site dating from the 8th-6th centuries B.C. near the village of Gazakhbeyli.
- The Shikhli Human Camp, an archaeological site near the village of Birinji Shikhli.
- Shakargala, in the Gazakh region.

== Prominent people from Gazakh ==
- Molla Panah Vagif - (1717–1797) prominent poet of Azerbaijan and social figure.
- Aliagha Shikhlinski - (1865–1943) general-lieutenant of the artillery, known as "God of Russian artillery".
- Samad Vurgun - (1906–1956) National Poet of Azerbaijan. (the first who deserved this title).
- Farrukh Gayibov - (1889–1916) the first Azerbaijani pilot, was awarded the 4th class order of "Saint Georgi".
- Mehdi Huseyn - (1909–1964) National Writer of Azerbaijan, Prominent writer-dramatist, critic.
- Ibrahim agha Vekilov - (1853–1934) general, the first Azerbaijani military topographer.
- Mammadrza agha Vakilov (1864-1944) was a member of the Parliament of the Azerbaijani Democratic Republic, full member of the Transcaucasian Medical Society, and founder of the Baku Medical Society.
- Ibrahim Rahimov - (1850-1927) Azerbaijan's first psychiatrist.
- Sona Valikhan - ( 1883-1982) the first female Azerbaijani doctor.
- Javad bey Shikhlinski - (1876–1940) general-mayor, the commander of the division.
- Ibrahim bey Usubov - (1872–1920) general-mayor, the commander of the division.
- Mirza Huseyn Afandi Qayibov - (1830–1917) the Chair of the Ecclesiastical Department of Transcaucasia.
- Leyla Vakilova - (1927-1999) Azerbaijani ballerina, People's Artist of the USSR, choreographer, professor.
- Mirvarid Dilbazi - (1912–2001) National Poet of Azerbaijan.
- Ismayil Shykhly - (1919–1995) National Writer of Azerbaijan, scientist- pedagogue, social-political figure.
- Nigar Shikhlinskaya- (1878-1931) the first Azerbaijani woman with higher education and the first military nurse.
- Nigar Usubova (1914-1995) – was a teacher, professor and head of piano department of Baku Academy of Music. She also worked as a vice-rector for educational and scientific work of Baku Academy of Music. She was twice awarded the Order of the Badge of Honor.
- Isa Mughanna - ( 1928-2014) National Writer of Azerbaijan.
- Khadija Gayibova - (1893-1938)the first female Azerbaijani pianist.
- Museyib Allahverdiyev- (1909-1969) Hero of the Soviet Union.
- Vidadi Babanli - (1927-) National Writer of Azerbaijan.
- Mammadali Huseynov - (1922-1994) Azerbaijani scientist, paleontologist, founder of the Azerbaijani school of paleontology, archaeologist.
- Amina Dilbazi - (1919–2010) ballet-master. National Artist of Azerbaijan.
- Mustafa bey Vakilov - (1896-1965) Azerbaijani public figure, politician and diplomat.The Minister of Internal Affairs.
- Ismat Gayibov - (1942-1991) Prosecutor General of the Republic of Azerbaijan.
- Maqsud Shayxzoda- (1908-1967) National Poet of Uzbekistan.
- Molla Vali Vidadi - (1707–1809) prominent poet of Azerbaijan.
- Mukhtar Hajiyev - (1876–1938) the first chairman of Azerbaijan Central Executive Committee in 1921.
- Ali Mustafayev - (1952–1991) National Hero of Azerbaijan.
- Yusif Samadoghlu - (1935-1998) National Writer of Azerbaijan.
- Vagif Samadoghlu - (1939-2015) National Poet of Azerbaijan.
- Elmira Huseynova - (1933–1995) sculptor.
- Madina Qiyasbayli- (1889-1938) educator, pedagogue, journalist and translator.
- Baba Mahmudoghlu- (1940-2006) Azerbaijani singer, People's Artiste of Azerbaijan.
- Ilgar Ismailov- (1959-1992) National Hero of Azerbaijan.
- Marifat Nasibov- (1972-1992) National Hero of Azerbaijan.
- Shahin Mustafayev- (1965) Prime Minister of Azerbaijan.
- Leyla Shikhlinskaya - (1947) Azerbaijani actress, People's Artiste of Azerbaijan.
- Hamida Omarova - (1957) Azerbaijani actress, People's Artiste of Azerbaijan.
- Samad Seyidov - (1964) professor and an Azerbaijani politician.
- Javanshir Vakilov (1951–2013) was an Azerbaijani diplomat, candidate of historical science since 1988, public and political figure, writer and pedagogue.
- Ulviyya Hajibeyova -(1960) Azerbaijani pianist and composer, professor of Baku Music Academy, People's Artiste of Azerbaijan.
- Badisaba Kocharli- (1881-1954) Azerbaijani philanthropist, educator, and enlightener.
- Elazan Bayjan (Haji Hasanzadeh) - (1913–1989) poet-doctor. Set up private medical clinics in Freyburg, Germany.
- Fatma Vekilova - (1912–1987) professor, doctor of geology-mineralogy sciences.
- Sayad Zeynalov - (1886–1942) deserved 4th class "Saint Georgi" order
- Teymur Bunyadov - (1928) academician, historian-ethnographer.
- Tahir Isayev, a.k.a. Serafino - (1922–2001).

Name of Villages	Name of Villages	Name of Villages
1-I Shikhli	16-Khanliglar	31-Ashaghi Eskipara
2-II Shikhli	17-Jafarli	32-Yukhari Eskipara
3-Yukhari Salahli	18-Bala Jafarli	33-Aghkoynak
4-Aslanbeyli	19-Barkhudarli	34-Garapapaq
6-Kamarli	21-Demirchiler	
7-Ashaghi Salahli	22-Alpout	
8-Orta Salahli	23-Urkmazli	
9-Gazaxbeyli	24-Abbasbeyli	
10-Kosalar	25-Gyzyl Hajili	
11-Janalli	26-Farahli	
12-Huseynbeyli	27-Mazam	
13-Dash Salahli	28-Gushchu Ayrim	
14-Chayli	29-Baghanis Ayrim	
15-Kommuna	30-Kheyrimli	
