= Army of Occupation =

Army of Occupation may refer to:

- Army of Occupation (Mexico), the U.S. Army commanded by Zachary Taylor during the Mexican–American War
- Army of Occupation (Germany), formed twice by the British Army of the Rhine following World Wars I and II respectively

== See also ==
- Military occupation
- List of military occupations
