= Hamudi Salman =

Israeli footballer

Hamudi Salman חמודי סלמן محمود"حمودي" سلمان
Personal information
- Full name: Mahmoud "Hamudi" Salman מחמוד "חמודי" סלמן
- Date of birth: 26 July 1979 (age 47)
- Place of birth: Israel
- Position: Midfielder

Youth career
- Hapoel Jerusalem

Senior career*
Years	Team	Apps	(Gls)
1998–2009	Hapoel Jerusalem	158	(21)
2006–2007	→ Hapoel Mevaseret Zion (loan)	9	(1)
- * Club domestic league appearances and goals as of 10:00, 22 November 2026 (UTC)

Mahmoud "Hamudi" Salman (Arabic: محمود"حمودي" سلمان, Hebrew: מחמוד "חמודי" סלמן; born 26 July 1979) is an Israeli former professional footballer.

== Playing Career ==
Midway through the Liga Leumit season of 2008–09, Salman made national news when he deserted the club and stated his intention to continue playing football for Jebel al-Mukaber of the Palestinian West Bank Premier League.

== Personal Life ==
Salman has two brothers, Amer and Mussa, both of whom also became professional footballers with Hapoel Jerusalem.

== Honours ==
- With Hapoel Jerusalem:
  - Liga Artzit: 2007/08
