= List of military occupations =

This article presents a list of military occupations, both historical and contemporary, that have taken place since the customary laws of belligerent military occupation were first clarified and supplemented by the Hague Convention of 1907.

As currently understood in international law, "military occupation" is the effective military control by a power over a territory outside the power's recognized sovereign territory. The occupying power in question may be an individual state or a supranational organization, such as the United Nations.

== Ongoing occupations ==
Military occupations in Europe, North Africa, and West Asia (for colouring correspondence, see below), as of February 2026.

| Territory | Since | Occupied state/territory | Occupying state | Occupier's declared state/territory | Status |
|---|---|---|---|---|---|
| Transnistria | 1992 | Moldova | Russia | Transnistria | Occupied by an armed group under the influence of a foreign power (Note: Seized during the Transnistria War; administered as the Pridnestrovian Moldavian Republic, a state with limited international recognition.) |
| Abkhazia | 2008 | Georgia | Russia | Abkhazia | Occupied by an armed group under the influence of a foreign power (Note: Seized during the Russo-Georgian War; administered as states with limited international recognition.) |
| South Ossetia | 2008 | Georgia | Russia | South Ossetia | Occupied by an armed group under the influence of a foreign power |
| Crimea | 2014 | Ukraine (Note: See Russo-Ukrainian War, War in Donbas and 2022 Russian invasion of Ukraine.) | Russia | Federal subjects of Russia: Republic of Crimea; Sevastopol | Occupied and annexed by a foreign power |
| Significant parts of Donetsk, Kherson, Luhansk, and Zaporizhzhia Oblasts Negligible parts of Kharkiv and Mykolaiv, Sumy and Dnipropetrovsk Oblasts | 2014 (Note: The occupation of Donetsk and Luhansk Oblasts occurred in two stages. The south of Luhansk Oblast and the southeast of Donetsk Oblast were occupied by Russian-backed separatists from 2014 to 2022. Later, in 2022, the north of Luhansk Oblast (i.e. almost the entire oblast) and the southwest of Donetsk Oblast (e.g. Mariupol) came under Russian occupation. Parts of the northeast of Donetsk Oblast were also occupied, but areas such as Lyman have been retaken by Ukraine as of October 2022.); 2022 (Note: Russia's occupation of Kherson Oblast (nearly the entire oblast) and Zaporizhzhia Oblast (only the southern portion) began in 2022. On the other hand, Donetsk and Luhansk Oblasts were initially partially occupied by Russian-backed separatists back in 2014. In 2022, larger areas of Donetsk and Luhansk Oblasts came under Russian occupation, and the Russian-backed separatists handed over absolute control to Russia, effectively designating the entire area as Russian-occupied (as opposed to separatists-occupied). In Zaporizhzhia Oblast, Russia lacks control of the capital city, Zaporizhzhia, but controls the second-biggest city, Melitopol, which is acting as the de facto capital. Parts of the northwest of Kherson Oblast have been retaken by Ukraine as of October 2022.); 2025 (Note: Russia has captured and reoccupied parts of the Sumy Oblast and Dnipropetrovsk Oblast since 2025.) | Ukraine | Russia | Federal subjects of Russia (Note: See Russian-occupied territories of Ukraine and Russian annexation of Donetsk, Kherson, Luhansk and Zaporizhzhia oblasts.): Donetsk People's Republic (Note: See Russian occupation of Donetsk Oblast.); Kherson Oblast; Luhansk People's Republic (Note: See Russian occupation of Luhansk Oblast.); Zaporizhzhia Oblast; Kharkiv Oblast; Mykolaiv Oblast; Sumy Oblast; Dnipropetrovsk Oblast | Donetsk, Kherson, Luhansk, Zaporizhzhia Oblasts: DPR & LPR: Occupied by an armed group under the influence of a foreign power (2014–2022); Four oblasts: Occupied and annexed by a foreign power (2022) (Note: As of November 2022, Russia does not control significant portions of Kherson Oblast, Zaporizhzhia Oblast, and Donetsk Oblast. In particular, Russia does not control the capital cities of Kherson and Zaporizhzhia Oblasts, namely Kherson and Zaporizhzhia, respectively. Russia formerly controlled Kherson for over eight months throughout 2022 after capturing it in the Battle of Kherson, although the city was eventually liberated by Ukraine following the successful 2022 Ukrainian southern counteroffensive on 10–11 November 2022. Russia never managed to occupy the city of Zaporizhzhia at any point. Meanwhile, Russia has never managed to occupy a significant portion of Donetsk Oblast in the northwest, although Russia does control the capital city, Donetsk. As for Luhansk Oblast, Russia controls nearly the entire oblast as of November 2022.); Kharkiv Oblast: Occupied by a foreign power; territory mostly recaptured by Ukraine; Mykolaiv Oblast: Occupied and partially annexed by a foreign power; territory mostly recaptured by Ukraine; Sumy Oblast: Occupied by a foreign power; Most of the territory is still under Ukrainian control; Dnipropetrovsk Oblast: Occupied by a foreign power; Most of the territory is still under Ukrainian control |
| Parts of Southern Lebanon | 2024 | Lebanon | Israel | —N/a | Occupied by a foreign power |
| East Jerusalem | 1967 | Indigenous Palestinians; Palestine (since 1988 declaration) (Note: The West Bank (including East Jerusalem) was occupied by Jordan and the Gaza Strip was occupied by Egypt from 1948 to 1967, and have been occupied by Israel since 1967. The State of Palestine, which claims these territories, was not founded until 1988 (see Palestinian Declaration of Independence). The State of Palestine is, as of November 2015, recognised by 136 countries and is also a United Nations non-member observer.) | Israel | (Israel) Part of the Jerusalem District (effectively annexed in 1980) | Occupied and annexed by a foreign power (Note: Seized during the Six-Day War from Jordan; effectively annexed in 1980 via the Jerusalem Law.) |
| West Bank | 1967 | Indigenous Palestinians; Palestine (since 1988 declaration) | Israel | (Israel) Judea and Samaria Area | Occupied by a foreign power, (Note: The West Bank was seized during the Six-Day War from Jordan, and is administered by the Israeli Civil Administration. The Oslo II Accord, officially signed on 28 September 1995, divided the West Bank into the Area C administered by Israel and the Area A and B administered by the Palestinian National Authority. The Gaza Strip was seized during the Six-Day War from Egypt. In 2005, Israel disengaged its military forces from the strip and no longer considers itself to be occupying the territory. Gaza's border crossings with Israel and maritime and air space are controlled by Israel. As of 2012, the United Nations "continue to refer to the Gaza Strip as part of the Occupied Palestinian Territory until such time as either the General Assembly or the Security Council take a different view.") with de facto partial annexation in the West Bank |
| Gaza Strip (Note: Still considered occupied despite the 2005 Israeli disengagement from Gaza. The system of control imposed by Israel has been described as an "indirect occupation". Some other legal scholars have disputed the idea that Israel still occupies Gaza.) | 1967 | Indigenous Palestinians; Palestine (since 1988 declaration) | Israel | —N/a | Occupied by a foreign power, with de facto partial annexation in the West Bank |
| Golan Heights | 1967 | Syria | Israel | (Israel) Part of the Northern District (effectively annexed in 1981) | Occupied and annexed by a foreign power. (Note: Seized during the Six-Day War; effectively annexed in 1981 via the Golan Heights Law. Lebanon also claims the Shebaa farms and sees the territory as being under Israeli occupation.) Recognized by only the United States as part of Israel. |
| Parts of Southern Syria | 2024 | Syria | Israel | —N/a | Occupied by a foreign power |
| Northern Cyprus | 1974 | Cyprus | Turkey | Northern Cyprus | Occupied by an armed group under the influence of a foreign power (Note: Seized during the Turkish invasion of Cyprus; administered as the Turkish Republic of Northern Cyprus, a state with limited international recognition) |
| Parts of Iraqi Kurdistan | 1997 | Iraq | Turkey | —N/a | Occupied by a foreign power (Note: Turkish forces launched a series of military operations in Iraqi Kurdistan against the Kurdistan Workers' Party (PKK) starting in the 1980s, with four major incursions taking place in the 1990s. After the end of major combat operations in 1997, Turkey maintained a small military presence across the border. In 2016, Turkey invaded both Syria and Iraq during the War against the Islamic State. Turkey has occupied significant territory in Iraqi Kurdistan continuously since then, more than 2,000 sq. km. as of 2025, despite the territorial defeat of Islamic State in Iraq in 2017 and the formal end of the PKK insurgency in May 2025.) |
| Yukhari Askipara, (Note: Armenia announced it would return Yukhari as part of the 2020 Nagorno-Karabakh ceasefire agreement, but it remains occupied as of 2024) Sofulu, Barxudarlı and Karki | 1992 | Azerbaijan | Armenia | (Armenia) Part of the Tavush and Ararat Provinces | Occupied and de facto annexed by a foreign power |
| Artsvashen | 1992 | Armenia | Azerbaijan | (Azerbaijan) Part of the Gadabay Rayon | Occupied and de facto annexed by a foreign power |
| Portions of Syunik, Vayots Dzor, and Gegharkunik Provinces | 2021 (Note: May and November 2021); 2022 (Note: September 2022) | Armenia | Azerbaijan | —N/a | Occupied by a foreign power, |
| Majority of Western Sahara | 1975 | Sahrawi Arab Democratic Republic (declared in 1976) | Morocco | (Morocco) Southern Provinces (annexed between 1976-79) | Occupied and annexed by a foreign power (Note: Seized during the Western Sahara War; de facto annexed; administered as the Southern Provinces; claimed by the Sahrawi Arab Democratic Republic, a state with limited international recognition.) |
| Parts of North Kivu and South Kivu | 2021 | Democratic Republic of the Congo | Rwanda | —N/a | Occupied by an armed group under the influence of a foreign power |

== Historical occupations ==
Events before the Hague Convention of 1907 are out of scope.

=== 1907–1914 ===
| Occupied territory | Years | Occupied state | Occupying state | Event | Part of war(s) | Subsequently annexed? |
|---|---|---|---|---|---|---|
| Korea | 1905–1910 | Korea | Japan | Japan–Korea Treaty of 1905 | Aftermath of Russo-Japanese War | Yes |
| Cuba | 1906–1909 | Cuba | United States | Second occupation of Cuba | Banana Wars | No |
| Libya | 1911–1912 | Ottoman Empire | Italy | Invasion of Libya | Italo-Turkish War | Yes |
| Albania | 1912–1913 | Albania | Serbia | Occupation of Albania | Balkan Wars | No |
| Nicaragua | 1912–1933 | Nicaragua | United States | Occupation of Nicaragua | Banana Wars | No |
| Veracruz | 1914 | Mexico | United States | Occupation of Veracruz | Mexican Revolution | No |

=== World War I and immediate aftermath ===
| Occupied territory | Years | Occupied state | Occupying state | Event | Part of war(s) | Subsequently annexed? |
|---|---|---|---|---|---|---|
| Albania | 1916–1918 | Albania | Austria-Hungary | Occupation of Albania | World War I | No |
| Eastern Galicia | 1914–1915 | Austria-Hungary | Russia | Occupation of Eastern Galicia | World War I | No |
| Belgium | 1914–1918 | Belgium | Germany | Occupation of Belgium | World War I | No |
| Kelmis | 1914-1915 | Neutral Moresnet | Germany | German capture of Moresnet | World War I | Yes |
| Northeastern France | 1914–1918 | France | Germany | Invasion of Northeastern France | World War I | No |
| Luxembourg | 1914–1918 | Luxembourg | Germany | Occupation of Luxembourg | World War I | No |
| Congress Poland | 1914–1918 | Russia | Austria-Hungary; Germany | Invasion of Russian Poland | World War I | No |
| Parts of the Baltic governorates and Vilna Governorate-General | 1914–1919 | Russia | Germany | Invasion of Baltic Russia | World War I | No |
| German South West Africa | 1914–1915 | Germany | South Africa | South West Africa campaign | World War I | Yes |
| Governorate of Serbia | 1915–1918 | Serbia | Austria-Hungary | Occupation of Serbia | World War I | No |
| Serbia | 1915–1918 | Serbia | Germany | Invasion of Serbia | World War I | No |
| Eastern Serbia | 1915–1918 | Serbia | Bulgaria | Occupation of Eastern Serbia | World War I | No |
| Serbian Macedonia | 1915–1918 | Serbia | Bulgaria | Occupation of Serbian Macedonia | World War I | Yes |
| Albania | 1915–1917 | Albania | Bulgaria | Occupation of Albania | World War I | No |
| Montenegro | 1916–1918 | Montenegro | Austria-Hungary | Occupation of Montenegro | World War I | No |
| Haiti | 1915–1934 | Haiti | United States | Occupation of Haiti | Banana Wars | No |
| Dominican Republic | 1916–1924 | Dominican Republic | United States | Occupation of the Dominican Republic | Banana Wars | No |
| Cuba | 1917–1922 | Cuba | United States | Sugar Intervention | Banana Wars | No |
| Northeast Italy | 1917–1918 | Italy | Austria-Hungary | Invasion of Northeastern Italy | World War I | No |
| Parts of the Russian Far East, Caucasus, Parts of Northern Russia | 1918–1925 (Note: Most of the Allies had withdrawn by 1920, Japan continued to occupy Northern Sakhalin until 1925.) | Russian SFSR Soviet Union | United Kingdom; Japan; Greece; United States; France; China | Allied intervention in the Russian Civil War | Russian Civil War | No |
| Constantinople | 1918–1923 | Ottoman Empire | France; Italy; United Kingdom | Occupation of Constantinople | Aftermath of World War I | No |
| Smyrna | 1919–1922 | Ottoman Empire | Greece | Occupation of Smyrna | Aftermath of World War I | No |
| Western Armenia (Kars, Ardahan, Surmalu) | 1920 | First Republic of Armenia | Turkey | Turkish invasion of Armenia | Aftermath of World War I | Yes |
| Rhineland | 1918–1930 | Germany | France United Kingdom Belgium United States Siam | Occupation of the Rhineland | Aftermath of World War I | No |
| Eastern Galicia | 1918–1919 | West Ukrainian People's Republic | Poland | Polish–Ukrainian War | Aftermath of World War I | Yes |
| Volhynia | 1918–1919 | Ukrainian People's Republic | Poland | Polish–Ukrainian War | Aftermath of World War I | Partial |
| Ukraine | 1918–1920 | Ukrainian People's Republic | Russian SFSR | Ukrainian–Soviet War | Aftermath of World War I | Yes |
| Dalmatia | 1918– 1921 | Kingdom of Serbs, Croats, and Slovenes | France; Italy; United Kingdom; United States | Allied occupation of eastern Adriatic | Aftermath of World War I | Partial |
| Transylvania, part of Banat, part of Carpathian Ruthenia, Tiszántúl, Danube–Tisza Interfluve, Budapest, Northwest Transdanubia | 1918–1920 | Kingdom of Hungary; First Hungarian Republic; Hungarian Soviet Republic; Hungarian Republic; Kingdom of Hungary | Romania | Revolutions and interventions in Hungary (1918–1920) | Aftermath of World War I | Partial |
| Slovakia, Carpathian Ruthenia, part of Northeast Hungary inc. Sátoraljaújhely (to 1920) | 1918–1920 | Kingdom of Hungary; First Hungarian Republic; Hungarian Soviet Republic; Hungarian Republic; Kingdom of Hungary | Czechoslovakia | Revolutions and interventions in Hungary (1918–1920) | Aftermath of World War I | Partial |
| part of Banat, Szeged | 1918–1920 | Kingdom of Hungary; First Hungarian Republic; Hungarian Soviet Republic; Hungarian Republic; Kingdom of Hungary | France | Revolutions and interventions in Hungary (1918–1920) | Aftermath of World War I | No |
| Prekmurje, Međimurje, Voivodina, part of Banat, Baranya, Bácska | 1918–1921 | Kingdom of Hungary; First Hungarian Republic; Hungarian Soviet Republic; Hungarian Republic; Kingdom of Hungary | Kingdom of Serbs, Croats, and Slovenes | Revolutions and interventions in Hungary (1918–1920) | Aftermath of World War I | Partial |
| Tyrol | 1918–1920 | German-Austria Austria | Italy | | Aftermath of World War I | Partial |
| Transcaucasia | 1920 | Armenia | Russia | Invasion of Armenia | Russian Civil War | Yes |
| Transcaucasia | 1920 | Azerbaijan | Russia | Invasion of Azerbaijan | Russian Civil War | Yes |
| Transcaucasia | 1921 | Georgia | Russia | Invasion of Georgia | Russian Civil War | Yes |
| Ruhr | 1923–1924 | Germany | Belgium; France | Occupation of the Ruhr | Aftermath of World War I | No |

=== World War II: build up and immediate aftermath ===
| Occupied territory | Years | Occupied state | Occupying state | Event | Part of war(s) | Subsequently annexed? |
|---|---|---|---|---|---|---|
| Manchuria / Manchukuo | 1931–1945 | China | Japan | Invasion of Manchuria | Second Sino-Japanese War | No |
| Xinjiang | 1934 | China | Soviet Union | Invasion of Xinjiang | Kumul Rebellion | No |
| Ethiopia | 1935–1941 | Ethiopia | Italy | Invasion of Ethiopia | Second Italo-Ethiopian War | Yes |
| Parts of China | 1937–1945 | China | Japan | Second Sino-Japanese War | World War II | No |
| Shanghai | 1937–1945 | China | Japan | Second Sino-Japanese War | World War II | No |
| Austria | 1938 | Austria | Germany | Anschluss | Events preceding World War II in Europe | Yes |
| Sudetenland | 1938 | Czechoslovakia | Germany | Munich Agreement | Events preceding World War II in Europe | Yes |
| Bohemia and Moravia | 1939–1945 | Czechoslovakia | Germany | Occupation of Czechoslovakia | Events preceding World War II in Europe | No |
| Memel Territory | 1939–1945 | Lithuania | Germany | Occupation of Memel | Events preceding World War II in Europe | Yes |
| Albania | 1939–1945 | Albania | Italy | Invasion of Albania | Events preceding World War II in Europe | No |
| Poland | 1939–1945 | Poland | Germany | Invasion of Poland | World War II | Partial |
| Eastern Poland | 1939–1941 | Poland | Soviet Union | Annexation of Polish territories | World War II | Partial |
| Parts of Finland | 1939–1940 | Finland | Soviet Union | Winter War | World War II | Partial |
| British Somaliland | 1940–1941 | United Kingdom | Italy | Italian invasion of British Somaliland | World War II | Yes |
| Belgium | 1940–1945 | Belgium | Germany | Invasion of Belgium | World War II | No |
| Denmark | 1940–1945 | Denmark | Germany | Invasion of Denmark | World War II | No |
| Faroe Islands | 1940–1945 | Denmark | United Kingdom | Occupation of the Faroe Islands | World War II | No |
| Greenland | 1940–1945 | Denmark | United States; United Kingdom | Greenland in World War II | World War II | No |
| Hankoniemi | 1940–1941 | Finland | Soviet Union | Winter War | World War II | No |
| Iceland (Note: On 17 June 1944, Iceland dissolved its union with Denmark and the Danish monarchy and declared itself a republic.) | 1940–1945 | Kingdom of Iceland | United Kingdom | Occupation of Iceland | World War II | No |
| Iceland | 1940–1945 | Kingdom of Iceland | United States (Note: On 7 July 1941, the defence of Iceland was transferred from Britain to the United States.) | Occupation of Iceland | World War II | No |
| Northern France (Note: de facto Vichy France) (Note: Occupied the rest of France from 1942) | 1940–1944 | France | Germany | Invasion of Northern France | World War II | No |
| Southeastern France (Note: de facto Vichy France) | 1940–1943 | France | Italy | Italian invasion of France | World War II | No |
| Vietnam | 1940–1945 | France | Japan | Invasion of French Indochina | World War II | No |
| Baltic states | 1940–1941 (Note: On March 26, 1949, the US department of State issued a circular letter stating that the Baltic countries were still independent nations with their own diplomatic representatives and consuls.) (Note: From the Welles Declaration of July 23, 1940, "that we would not recognise the occupation, the United States acted with a consistency and a tenacity of which we can all be proud. We housed the exiled Baltic diplomatic delegations. We accredited their diplomats. We flew their flags in the State Department's Hall of Flags. We never recognised in deed or word or symbol the illegal occupation of their lands.") | Estonia | Soviet Union | Soviet occupation of the Baltic states | World War II | Yes |
| Baltic states | 1940–1941 | Latvia | Soviet Union | Soviet occupation of the Baltic states | World War II | Yes |
| Baltic states | 1940–1941 | Lithuania | Soviet Union | Soviet occupation of the Baltic states | World War II | Yes |
| Luxembourg | 1940–1945 | Luxembourg | Germany | Occupation of Luxembourg | World War II | No |
| Netherlands | 1940–1945 | Netherlands | Germany | Invasion of the Netherlands | World War II | No |
| Norway | 1940–1945 | Norway | Germany | Invasion of Norway | World War II | No |
| Bessarabia, Northern Bukovina and the Hertsa region | 1940 | Romania | Soviet Union | Occupation of Bessarabia and Northern Bukovina | World War II | Yes |
| Channel Islands | 1940–1945 | United Kingdom | Germany | Occupation of the Channel Islands | World War II | No |
| Cambodia | 1941–1945 | France | Japan | Invasion of Cambodia | World War II | No |
| Greece | 1941–1944 | Greece | Bulgaria; Italy; Germany | Occupation of Greece | World War II | No |
| Iran | 1941–1946 | Iran | Soviet Union; United Kingdom | Anglo-Soviet invasion of Iran | World War II | No |
| Byelorussia | 1941–1944 | Soviet Union | Germany | Occupation of Byelorussia | World War II | No |
| Ukraine | 1941–1944 | Soviet Union | Germany | Occupation of Ukraine | World War II | No |
| Baltic states | 1941–1944 | Soviet Union | Germany | Occupation of Estonia, Latvia and Lithuania (de jure independent, de facto under Soviet rule) | World War II | No |
| Parts of European Russia | 1941–1944 | Soviet Union | Germany | Eastern Front | World War II | No |
| Eastern Karelia | 1941–1944 | Soviet Union | Finland | Continuation War | World War II | No |
| Guam | 1941–1944 | United States | Japan | Occupation of Guam | World War II | No |
| Transnistria | 1941–1944 | Soviet Union | Romania | Operation Barbarossa | World War II | No |
| Borneo | 1941–1945 | United Kingdom | Japan | Occupation of British Borneo | World War II | No |
| Hong Kong | 1941–1945 | United Kingdom | Japan | Occupation of Hong Kong | World War II | No |
| Malaya | 1941–1945 | United Kingdom | Japan | Occupation of Malaya | World War II | No |
| Yugoslavia | 1941–1945 | Yugoslavia | Bulgaria; Hungary; Italy; Germany; Croatia | Military operations in the territory of Yugoslavia | World War II | No |
| New Caledonia | 1942–1945 | France | United States | New Caledonia during WWII | World War II | No |
| New Guinea | 1942–1945 | Australia | Japan | New Guinea campaign | World War II | No |
| Nauru | 1942–1945 | Australia; New Zealand; United Kingdom | Japan | Occupation of Nauru | World War II | No |
| Andaman Islands | 1942–1945 | British Raj | Japan | Occupation of the Andaman Islands | World War II | No |
| Dutch East Indies | 1942–1945 | Netherlands | Japan | Occupation of Dutch East Indies | World War II | No |
| Philippines | 1942–1945 | Philippines | Japan | Occupation of the Philippines | World War II | No |
| Portuguese Timor | 1942–1945 | Portugal | Japan | Battle of Timor | World War II | No |
| Burma (Myanmar) | 1942–1945 | United Kingdom | Japan | Occupation of Burma | World War II | No |
| Singapore | 1942–1945 | United Kingdom | Japan | Occupation of Singapore | World War II | No |
| Kiska | 1942–1943 | United States | Japan | Occupation of Kiska | World War II | No |
| Attu | 1942–1943 | United States | Japan | Occupation of Attu | World War II | No |
| Italian Libya | 1943–1951 | Libya | United Kingdom; France | Allied occupation of Libya | World War II | No |
| Italy | 1943–1945 | Italy | Germany | Occupation of Italy, Italian campaign | World War II | No |
| Hungary | 1944–1945 | Hungary | Germany | Occupation of Hungary | World War II | No |
| Italy | 1943–1945 | Italy | United Kingdom; United States | Occupation of Italy, Italian campaign | World War II | No |
| France | 1944–1946 | France | Free France; United Kingdom; United States | Liberation of France | World War II | No |
| Baltic states | 1944–1991 | Estonia | Soviet Union | 1944 Soviet re-occupation, Baltic states under Soviet rule | World War II | Yes |
| Baltic states | 1944–1991 | Latvia | Soviet Union | 1944 Soviet re-occupation, Baltic states under Soviet rule | World War II | Yes |
| Baltic states | 1944–1991 | Lithuania | Soviet Union | 1944 Soviet re-occupation, Baltic states under Soviet rule | World War II | Yes |
| Bulgaria | 1944–1947 | Bulgaria | Soviet Union | Occupation of Bulgaria | World War II | No |
| Romania | 1944–1958 | Romania | Soviet Union | Occupation of Romania | World War II | No |
| Poland | 1944–1956 (Note: A status of forces agreement was signed in December 1956 to formally regulate the position of Soviet troops in Poland, which had been there since the end of the Second World War. After the end of the country's Soviet-backed Communist regime in 1989, the last Soviet contingent would leave the country in 1993.) | Poland | Soviet Union | Soviet presence in Poland | World War II | No |
| Hungary | 1944–1949 (Note: A status of forces agreement was signed in 1947 to regulate the position of Soviet troops in Hungary, which was further confirmed by Hungary's later membership in Comecon in 1949. Soviet troops would remain stationed in Hungary until 1991.) | Hungary | Soviet Union | Occupation of Hungary | World War II | No |
| Porkkalanniemi | 1944–1956 | Finland | Soviet Union | Continuation War | World War II | No |
| Carpathian Ruthenia | 1944–1945 | Czechoslovakia | Soviet Union | Annexation of Carpathian Ruthenia | World War II | Yes |
| Northern part of East Prussia/Kaliningrad Oblast | 1945 | Germany | Soviet Union | East Prussian offensive | World War II | Yes |
| Manchuria | 1945–1946 | Manchukuo | Soviet Union | Soviet–Japanese War | World War II | No |
| Austria | 1945–1955 | Austria | United Kingdom; United States; Soviet Union; France | Allied-occupied Austria | Aftermath of World War II | No |
| East Germany, incl. East Berlin | 1945–1949 | Germany | Soviet Union | Allied-occupied Germany | Aftermath of World War II | No |
| West Germany | 1945–1949 | Germany | United Kingdom; United States; France | Allied-occupied Germany | Aftermath of World War II | No |
| West Berlin | 1945–1990 | Germany | United Kingdom; United States; France | Allied-occupied Germany | Aftermath of World War II | No |
| Saarland | 1945–1957 | Germany | France | Saar Protectorate | Aftermath of World War II | No |
| Northern Iran | 1945–1946 | Iran | Soviet Union | Iran crisis of 1946 | Aftermath of World War II | No |
| Japan (mainland) | 1945–1951 | Japan | United States | Occupation of Japan | Aftermath of World War II | No |
| Tokara Islands | 1945–1952 | Japan | United States | Occupation of Japan | Aftermath of World War II | No |
| Amami Islands | 1945–1953 | Japan | United States | Occupation of Japan | Aftermath of World War II | No |
| Ogasawara archipelago | 1945–1968 | Japan | United States | Occupation of Japan | Aftermath of World War II | No |
| Daitō Islands and Ryukyu Islands (Note: The Tokara Islands were restored to Japan in 1952. The Amami Islands were restored in 1953.) | 1945–1972 | Japan | United States | Occupation of Japan | Aftermath of World War II | No |
| Pescadores and Itu Aba | 1945–1952 | Japan | China | History of Taiwan since 1945 | Aftermath of World War II | No |
| Korea | 1945–1948 | Korea | United States; Soviet Union | Occupation of Korea | Aftermath of World War II | No |
| Southern Vietnam and Saigon | 1945–1946 | France | United Kingdom | War of Vietnam | Aftermath of World War II | No |

=== 1947–1968 ===
| Occupied territory | Years | Occupied state | Occupying state | Event | Part of war(s) | Subsequently annexed? | |
|---|---|---|---|---|---|---|---|
| Junagadh | 1947–1948 | Junagadh | India | Annexation of Junagadh | —N/a | Yes | |
| West Bank | 1948–1967 | Post-Mandate Palestine | Jordan | Jordanian annexation of the West Bank | 1948 Arab–Israeli War | Yes | |
| Gaza Strip | 1948–1956; 1957–1967 (Note: The All-Palestine Government was de facto controlled by Egypt. Formal occupation occurred only from 1959 to 1967 after that government was dissolved.) | Post-Mandate Palestine | Egypt | Occupation of the Gaza Strip by Egypt | 1948 Arab–Israeli War | No | |
| Hyderabad | 1948 | Hyderabad | India | Annexation of Hyderabad | —N/a | Yes | |
| Sikkim | 1949–1950 | Sikkim | India | Intervention in Sikkim | —N/a | No | |
| Tibet | 1949–1951 | Tibet | China | Annexation of Tibet | —N/a | Yes | |
| Most of South Korea | 1950–1951 | North Korea | South Korea | North Korean occupation of South Korea, Korean Armistice Agreement | Korean War | No | |
| Northern Jordan Valley | 1949-1967 | Israel | Syria | 1949 Armistice Agreements | 1948 Arab–Israeli War | No | |
| Dadra and Nagar Haveli | 1954–1974 | Portugal | India | Annexation of Dadra and Nagar Haveli | —N/a | Yes | |
| Suez Canal Zone | 1956 | Egypt | France; United Kingdom | Suez Crisis | Arab–Israeli conflict | No | |
| Sinai | 1956–1957 | Egypt | Israel | Suez Crisis | Arab–Israeli conflict | No | |
| Gaza Strip | 1956–1957 | All-Palestine | Israel | Suez Crisis | Arab–Israeli conflict | No | |
| Hungary | 1956 | Hungary | Soviet Union | Hungarian Uprising | Hungarian Revolution of 1956 | No | |
| Laos | 1959–1975 | Laos | North Vietnam | Invasion of Laos | Laotian Civil War | No | No |
| Goa, Daman and Diu | 1961–1974 | Portugal | India | Annexation of Goa | —N/a | Yes | |
| Aksai Chin | 1962 | India | China | Sino-Indian War | | Yes | |
| Arunachal Pradesh | 1962 | India | China | Sino-Indian War | | No | |
| Dominican Republic | 1965–1966 | Dominican Republic | United States | Invasion of the Dominican Republic | Dominican Civil War | No | |
| Sinai | 1967–1982 (Note: Israel withdrew from Taba in 1989.) | Egypt | Israel | Six-Day War | Arab–Israeli conflict | No | |
| Czechoslovakia | 1968–1989 (Note: Government control ended with the Velvet Revolution in late 1989, and stationed Soviet troops departed peacefully over 1990–1991.) | Czechoslovakia | Soviet Union; Bulgaria; Poland; East Germany; Hungary | Invasion of Czechoslovakia | Prague Spring | No | |

=== 1970–1991 ===
| Occupied territory | Years | Occupied state | Occupying state | Event | Part of war(s) | Subsequently annexed? |
|---|---|---|---|---|---|---|
| East Pakistan (became Bangladesh) | 1971 | Pakistan | India | Indo-Pakistani War of 1971 | Bangladesh Liberation War | |
| Southern half of Vietnam | 1975–1976 | South Vietnam | North Vietnam | 1975 spring offensive | Vietnam War | Yes |
| Parts of Angola | 1975–1976 | Angola | South Africa | South African invasion of Angola | South African Border War | No |
| Tiris al-Gharbiyya | 1975–1979 | Western Sahara | Mauritania | Battles of La Güera and Tichla | Western Sahara War | No |
| East Timor | 1975–1999 | East Timor | Indonesia | Invasion of East Timor | Indonesian occupation of East Timor | Yes |
| Aouzou Strip | 1976–1987 | Chad | Libya | Occupation of the Aouzou Strip | Chadian–Libyan War | No |
| Parts of Lebanon | 1976–2005 | Lebanon | Syria | Syrian occupation of Lebanon | Lebanese Civil War | No |
| Kagera Region | 1978 | Uganda | Tanzania | Ugandan invasion of Kagera | Uganda–Tanzania War | No |
| Southern Lebanon | 1978–1982 | Lebanon | Free Lebanon State | 1978 Lebanon war | Lebanese Civil War | No |
| Southern Lebanon | March 1978 | Lebanon | Israel | 1978 Lebanon war | Lebanese Civil War | No |
| Cambodia | 1978–1989 | Kampuchea | Vietnam | Invasion of Kampuchea | Cambodian–Vietnamese War | No |
| Parts of Vietnam | 1979 | Vietnam | China | Invasion of Vietnam | Sino-Vietnamese War | No |
| Afghanistan | 1979–1989 | Afghanistan | Soviet Union | Invasion of Afghanistan | Afghan–Soviet War | No |
| Falkland Islands | 1982 | United Kingdom | Argentina | Occupation of the Falkland Islands | Falklands War | No |
| South Lebanon | 1982–2000 | Lebanon | Israel | Israeli occupation of South Lebanon | 1982 Lebanon War | No |
| Grenada | 1983 | Grenada | United States; Barbados; Jamaica; Antigua and Barbuda; Dominica; Saint Kitts and Nevis; Saint Lucia; Saint Vincent and the Grenadines | Invasion of Grenada | Grenadian Revolution | No |
| Iraqi Kurdistan | 1984–present | Iraq (Kurdistan Region) | Turkey | Turkish occupation of Iraqi Kurdistan | Kurdish–Turkish conflict | |
| Northern Province | 1987–1990 | Sri Lanka | India | Indian intervention in the Sri Lankan Civil War | Sri Lankan Civil War | No |
| Maldives | 1988 | Maldives | India | 1988 Maldives coup d'état | —N/a | No |
| Panama | 1989–1990 | Panama | United States | Invasion of Panama | War on drugs | No |
| Kuwait | 1990–1991 | Kuwait | Iraq: Kuwait Governorate; Saddamiyat al-Mitla' District | Invasion of Kuwait | Gulf War | Yes |

=== 1992–1999 ===
| Occupied territory | Years | Occupied state | Occupying state | Event | Part of war(s) | Subsequently annexed? |
|---|---|---|---|---|---|---|
| Seven districts surrounding Nagorno-Karabakh | 1992–2020 | Azerbaijan | Armenia; Artsakh | First Nagorno-Karabakh War | Nagorno-Karabakh conflict | Yes (by Artsakh) |
| Bağanıs Ayrım, Aşağı Əskipara, Xeyrimli and Ghizilhajili | 1992–2024 | Azerbaijan | Armenia | First Nagorno-Karabakh War | Nagorno-Karabakh conflict | No |
| Haiti | 1994–1995 | Haiti | United States; Poland; Argentina | Operation Uphold Democracy | 1991 Haitian coup d'état | No |
| Lesotho | 1998–1999 | Lesotho | South Africa; Botswana | Operation Boleas | Lesotho general election riots | No |
| Parts of the Democratic Republic of the Congo | 1998–2002 | Democratic Republic of the Congo | Uganda; Rwanda; Zimbabwe; Angola; Namibia; Chad; Sudan | Foreign support to the DR Congo | Second Congo War | No |

=== 2000–2019 ===
| Occupied territory | Years | Occupied state | Occupying state | Event | Part of war(s) | Subsequently annexed? |
|---|---|---|---|---|---|---|
| Gash-Barka, Southern, Northern Red Sea and Southern Red Sea regions of Eritrea | 2000–2018 | Eritrea | Ethiopia | Regions were seized at the end of the Eritrean–Ethiopian War in 2000, and subsequently delimited and demarcated by the Permanent Court of Arbitration at the Hague to be Eritrean territory. Eritrea recaptured the lands during the Tigray war. | Eritrean–Ethiopian War | No |
| Afghanistan (Note: Occupation of Afghanistan by the U.S.-led NATO ended on June 18, 2002 following the 2002 loya jirga that established the Transitional Islamic State of Afghanistan. From June 19, 2002, U.S.-led NATO forces operated in Afghanistan with the consent of the new Afghan government.) | 2001–2002 | Islamic Emirate of Afghanistan | United States; United Kingdom; Canada; Australia; New Zealand; and other troops | United States invasion of Afghanistan | War in Afghanistan (2001–2021) | No |
| Iraq (Note: Occupation of Iraq by the U.S.-led Coalition ended on June 28, 2004 when the Coalition Provisional Authority (CPA) handed back control of Iraq to the Iraqi Interim Government as mandated by UN Resolution 1546. From June 29, 2004, U.S.-led Coalition forces operated in Iraq with the consent of the new Iraqi government.) | 2003–2004 | Iraq | United States; United Kingdom; Australia; Poland; and other troops | 2003 invasion of Iraq; Occupation of Iraq | Iraq War | No |
| Parts of Somalia | 2006–2009 | Somalia | Ethiopia | Somalia War (2006–2009) | Somali Civil War | No |
| Gori and Poti | 2008 | Georgia | Russia | Occupation of Gori and Poti | Russo-Georgian War | No |
| Perevi | 2008–2010 | Georgia | Russia | Occupation of Perevi | Russo-Georgian War | No |
| Al-Tanf | 2016–2026 | Syrian Interim Government | US | Al-Tanf offensive (2016), Fall of the Assad regime | Syrian Civil War | No |
| Azaz, al-Bab and Jarabulus Districts | 2016–2025 | Syrian Interim Government | Turkey | Turkish military intervention in Syria | Syrian Civil War | No |
| Afrin District | 2018–2025 | Syrian Interim Government | Turkey | Turkish involvement in the Syrian civil war and Kurdish–Turkish conflict (2015–present) | Syrian Civil War | No |
| Tell Abyad and Ras al-Ayn Districts | 2019–2025 | Syrian Interim Government | Turkey | Turkish involvement in the Syrian civil war and Kurdish–Turkish conflict (2015–present) | Syrian Civil War | No |

=== 2020–present ===
| Occupied territory | Years | Occupied state | Occupying state | Event | Part of war(s) | Subsequently annexed? |
|---|---|---|---|---|---|---|
| Parts of Chernihiv, Dnipropetrovsk, Kharkiv, Kyiv, Poltava, Sumy, and Zhytomyr Oblasts (Note: These oblasts of Ukraine were all partially occupied by Russia during the 2022 Russian invasion of Ukraine. However, these oblasts were eventually relinquished after several weeks. On the other hand, Russia has also occupied (parts of) Donetsk, Kherson, Luhansk, and Zaporizhzhia Oblasts during the same invasion, eventually annexing them (including uncontrolled parts) in September–October 2022. Additionally, amid the 2022 annexation, Russia streamlined two small parts of Mykolaiv Oblast into Kherson Oblast, namely the city of Snihurivka and its surroundings, as well as the outer portion of the Kinburn Peninsula. Earlier, Russia occupied and annexed Crimea (including Sevastopol) in 2014, which was also previously administered by Ukraine.) (Note: See Russian occupation of Chernihiv, Kharkiv, Kyiv, Sumy, and Zhytomyr Oblasts.); Chernobyl Exclusion Zone (Note: The Chernobyl Exclusion Zone, the site of the Chernobyl nuclear disaster in 1986, was captured by Russia during the 2022 invasion. Most of Chernobyl EZ lies within Kyiv Oblast (and partially within Zhytomyr Oblast), but it is off-limits to civilians. Chernobyl EZ was retaken by Ukraine in March–April 2022.); Snake Island (Note: Snake Island, which is administratively part of Odesa Oblast and located in the Black Sea, was captured by Russia at the beginning of the invasion, on 24 February 2022. Snake Island was retaken by Ukraine on 30 June 2022.) | 2022–2024 | Ukraine | Russia | Russian invasion of Ukraine | Russo-Ukrainian War | No (Note: Russia still controls a small part of Kharkiv Oblast, which it has not officially annexed.) |
| Parts of Bryansk Oblast, Belgorod Oblast and Kursk Oblast | 2023–2025 (uncontinuous) | Russia | Ukraine | 2023 Bryansk Oblast raid, 2023 Belgorod Oblast incursions, March 2024 western Russia incursion, Kursk campaign | Russo-Ukrainian War | No |

== See also ==
- Russian-occupied territories
- Israeli-occupied territories
- Military occupations by the Soviet Union
- Territories of the United States § Former U.S. military occupations
- Peacekeeping – military deployments for peace-keeping purposes
- List of military and civilian missions of the European Union
- Annexation
- Revanchism
- For a list of states that have seceded unilaterally see List of states with limited recognition
- For a list of cases where territory is disputed between countries, see List of territorial disputes

== Bibliography ==
- Secretariat of the European Parliament DG-EXPO (2015), Occupation/Annexation of a Territory: Respect for International Humanitarian Law and Human Rights and Consistent EU Policy (PDF)
- Chapman, Jessica M. (2013). Cauldron of Resistance: Ngo Dinh Diem, the United States, and 1950s Southern Vietnam. Ithaca, New York: Cornell University Press. ISBN 978-0-8014-5061-7.
