= Jabel Mukaber =

- Municipality type B

Arabic transcription(s)
  - Arabic: جبل مكبر
  - Latin: Jabal Mukaber; Jabel Muqaber; Jabal Mukkaber (unofficial)

Hebrew transcription(s)
  - Hebrew: ג'בל מוכאבר
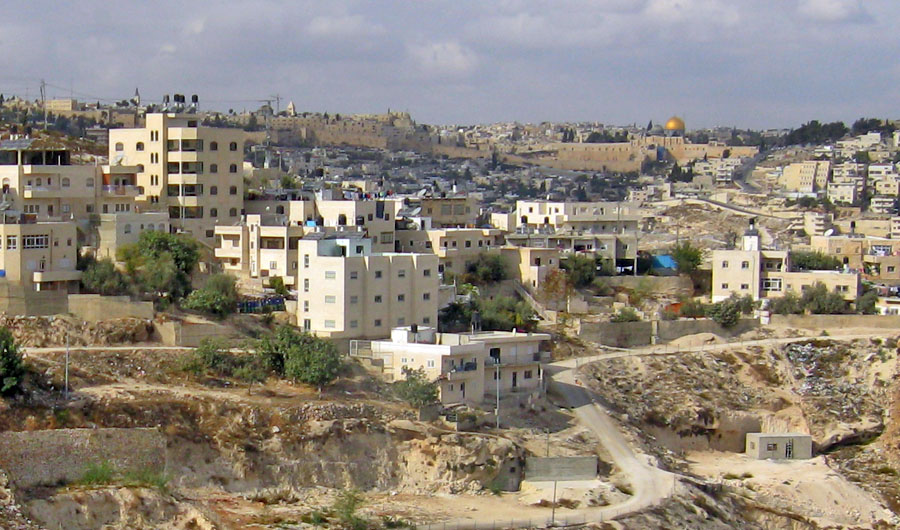
- Jabel Mukaber with the Dome of the Rock seen in the background.

- Location of Jabel Mukaber within Palestine Jabel Mukaber (the West Bank)
- Coordinates: 31°45′17″N 35°14′28″E
- State: State of Palestine
- Governorate: Jerusalem
- Occupying state: Israel
- Israeli district: Jerusalem District

Government
  - Type: Municipality

Population
  - Total: 16,030

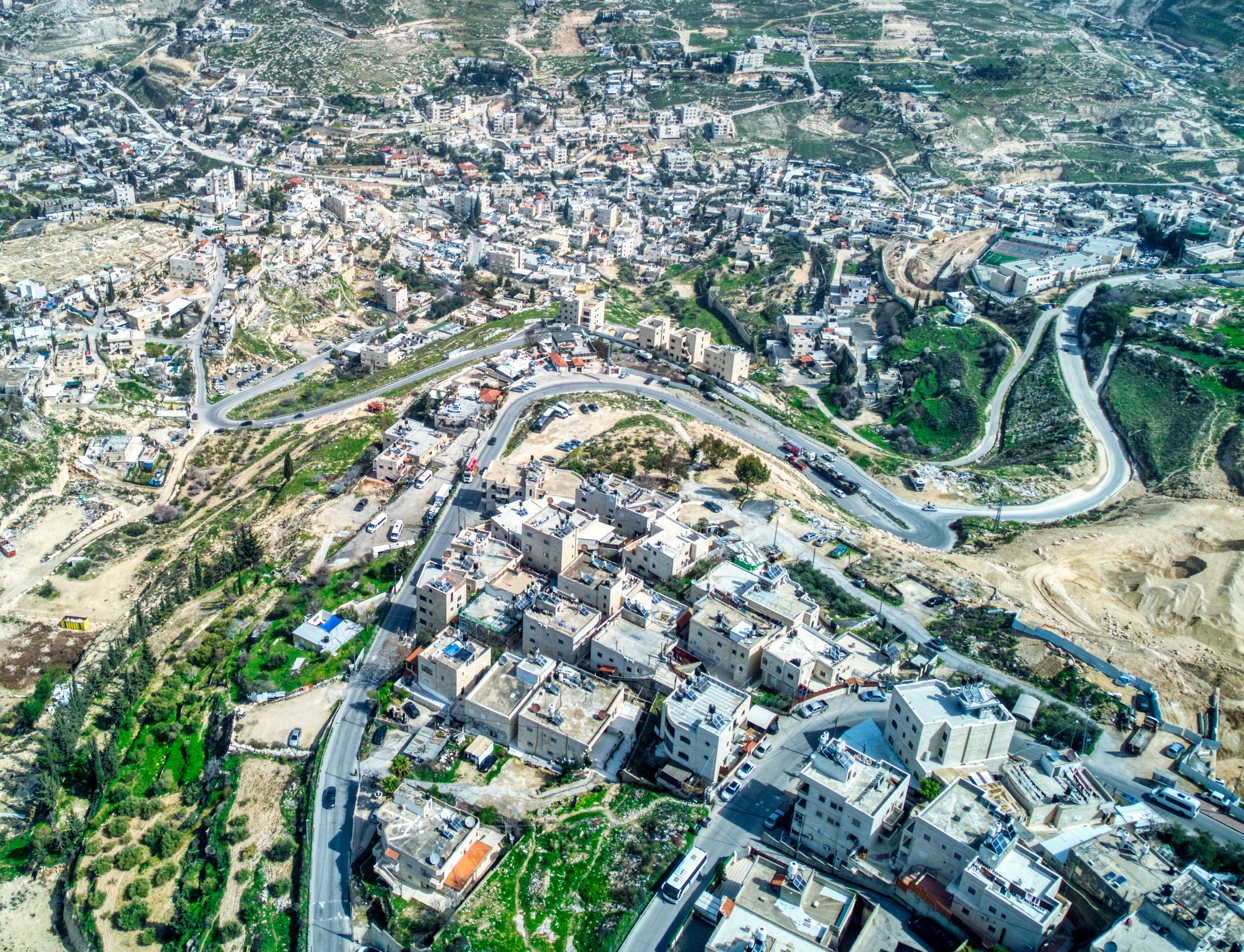
Northern part of Jabel Mukaber

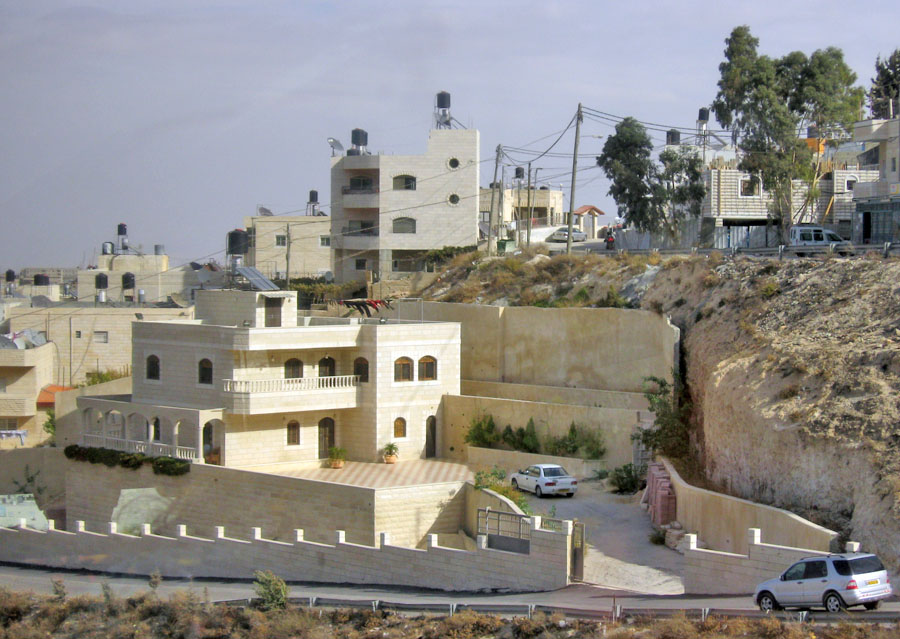
Dwellings in Jabel Mukaber

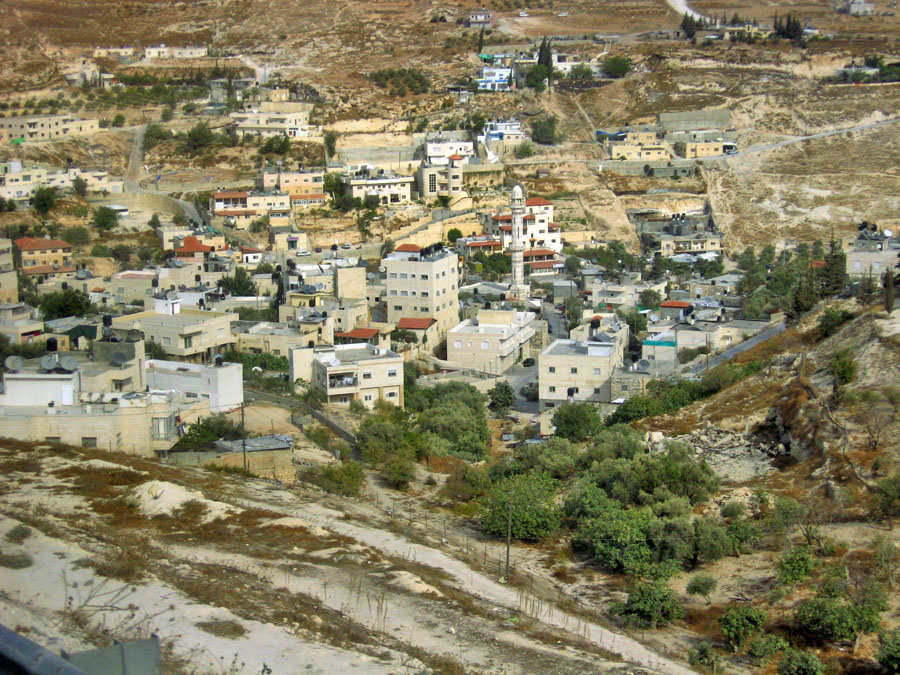
Houses located in the lower part of Jabel Mukaber

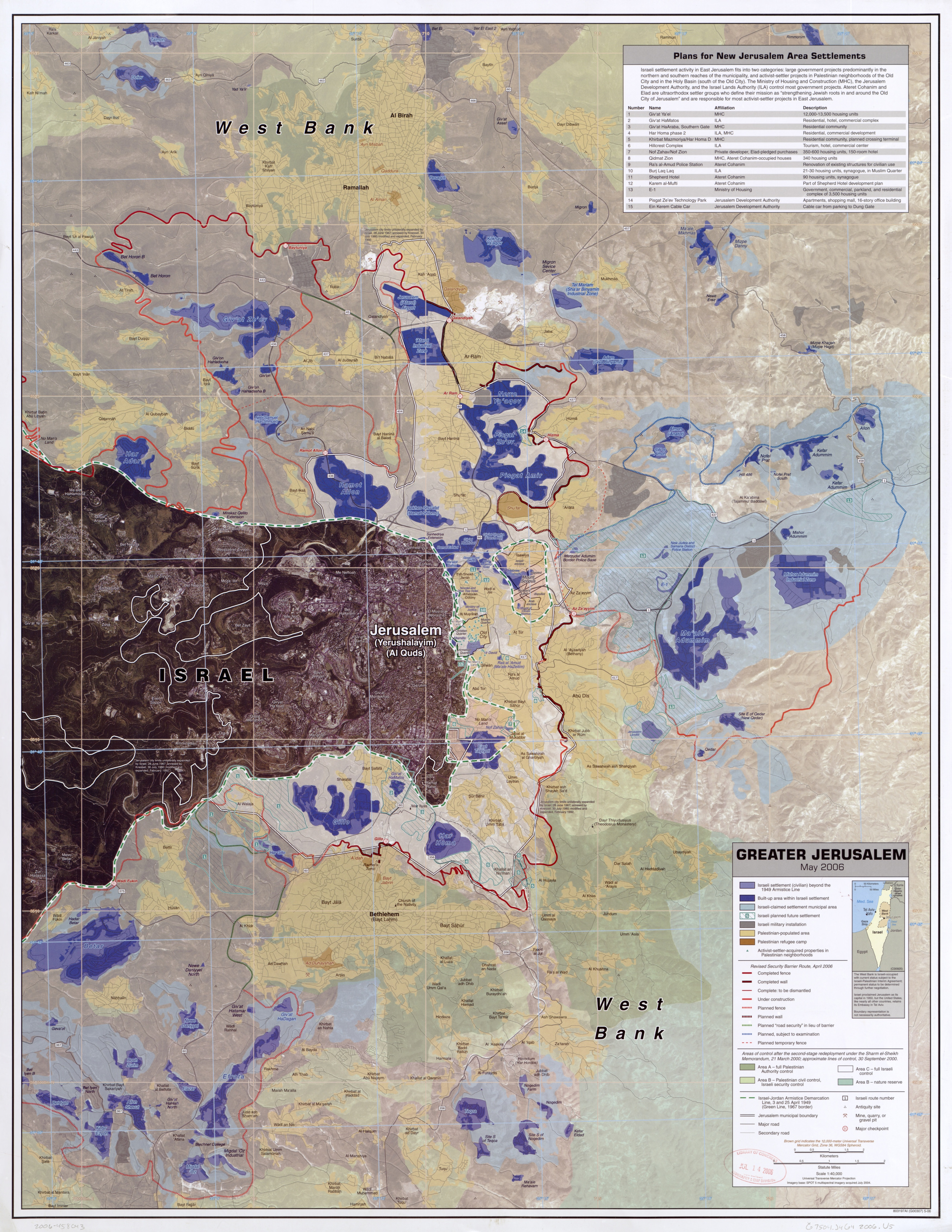
Jabel Mukaber is in the middle of the map.

Jabel Mukaber (Arabic: جبل مكبر, Hebrew: ג'בל מוכאבר) is a predominantly Palestinian neighborhood in southern East Jerusalem. It is bordered by East Talpiot to the west, Abu Tor and Silwan to the north and Sur Baher to the south. Jabel Mukaber has a population of approximately 30,000 (2017).

== History ==
=== Antiquity ===
Numerous Jewish burial caves, dating from the Second Temple period, have been found in the neighborhood. Most of them follow patterns typical of the period, including kokhim. In 2007, a particular burial cave with kokhim was discovered, displaying charcoal graffiti on its walls. The graffiti appeared to depict the names of the deceased, including the name Yismael (ישמעאל), a name commonly found among Jews of that era.

=== Ottoman Empire ===
According to local legend, Jabel Mukaber is named after Umar ibn al-Khattab, a disciple of Muhammad and the second caliph of the Islamic Caliphate, who cried Allahu Akbar at this site. It was substantially settled by members of the Bedouin Sawarha tribe at the turn of the 20th century.

=== British Mandate ===
During the Mandatory Palestine, the offices of the British High Commissioner, the representative of British imperial rule in Mandatory Palestine were located on the ridge of Jabel Mukaber (known as the Hill of Evil Counsel in medieval Christian tradition, which identified it as the residence of Caiaphas where Judas plotted to kill Jesus). During the 1948 Arab–Israeli War, the Egyptian Muslim Brotherhood battled Jewish forces in the area.

=== Jordan ===
Jabel Mukaber and other Arab villages in East Jerusalem came under Jordanian control, with the division of the city formalized in the Armistice Agreement of 3 April 1949. Jordan subsequently unilaterally annexed the West Bank, a move that was largely unrecognized internationally.

=== Israel ===
After the 1967 Six-Day War, Jabel Mukaber has been under Israeli occupation. Israel unilaterally placed six of the Jabel Mukaber's seven neighbouring villages under the jurisdiction of the Jerusalem Municipality, The exception was ash-Sheikh Sa'd, which was detached from Jabel Mukaber, though the two villages were locally considered to be one place, and excluded from Israel's incorporation of the area with its provision that the villagers would be treated as permanent residents of Israel.

According to ARIJ, Israel has confiscated the following areas of land from Jabel Mukaber in order to construct Israeli settlements:

- 544 dunams for East Talpiot,
- 140 dunams for Nof Zion.

East Talpiot was established in 1970 in close proximity to Jabel Mukaber during the upswing of building that followed the Six-Day War. When the Second Intifada (uprising) began, the mood changed. Since then, Jabel Mukaber has been the scene of numerous demonstrations, protests and riots in support of the Palestinian cause.

The Jerusalem Municipality began to draw up a zoning plan for Jabel Mukhaber in 1980. It was finally approved 16 years later, in 1996. The plan designated 70% of Jabel Mukhaber land as a green zone. The land set aside for housing construction was 20.5%, though most of it had already been used to that end. The housing density for the Arab area was set at 25%, in contrast to the 140% housing density level allowed for construction in the adjacent Jewish suburbs of East Jerusalem.

Oded Shalom, writing in 2017, states that Jabel Mukaber is

'A depressing slum with garbage spilling over from dumpsters all over the streets, with no playgrounds and no green areas, with a shortage of classrooms and kindergartens, with one high school for boys which was opened only two years ago after 20-year pleadings from the residents. They pay taxes to the state and property tax to the municipality, but don’t seem to be getting anything visible in return. .'

== Demography ==
Many residents of Jabel Mukaber rejected Israeli citizenship to demonstrate their solidarity with Palestinians in the West Bank, but they are considered permanent residents. As holders of blue identity cards, they have wide freedom of movement within Israel, and have access to health care, unemployment and other benefits.

The construction of the Israeli West Bank barrier has divided Jabel Mukaber in half and left some neighborhood residents on the West Bank side of the wall, meaning that they hold Palestinian IDs rather than Israeli IDs, and cannot cross into Israel itself. Running through the centre of the neighbourhood, the barrier often separates members of the same family from one another, disrupting normal family life. Jabel Mukaber is under-budgeted for municipal services, leading to sewage blockages in parts of the neighborhood and a shortage of classrooms.

== Landmarks ==
A Tolerance Monument sculpted by Czesław Dźwigaj in collaboration with Michal Kubiak is situated on a hill marking the divide between Jewish East Talpiot and Arab Jabel Mukaber, standing opposite the United Nations headquarters in Jerusalem in a park near Goldman Promenade. Unveiled in Jerusalem in 2008, it was funded by Polish businessman Aleksander Gudzowaty as a symbol to promote peace in the Israeli–Palestinian conflict.

== See also ==
- Jabal Al-Mukaber Club
- List of places in Jerusalem
- List of East Jerusalem locations
