= Memorial to the Victims of December 1970 =

Monument in Szczecin, Poland

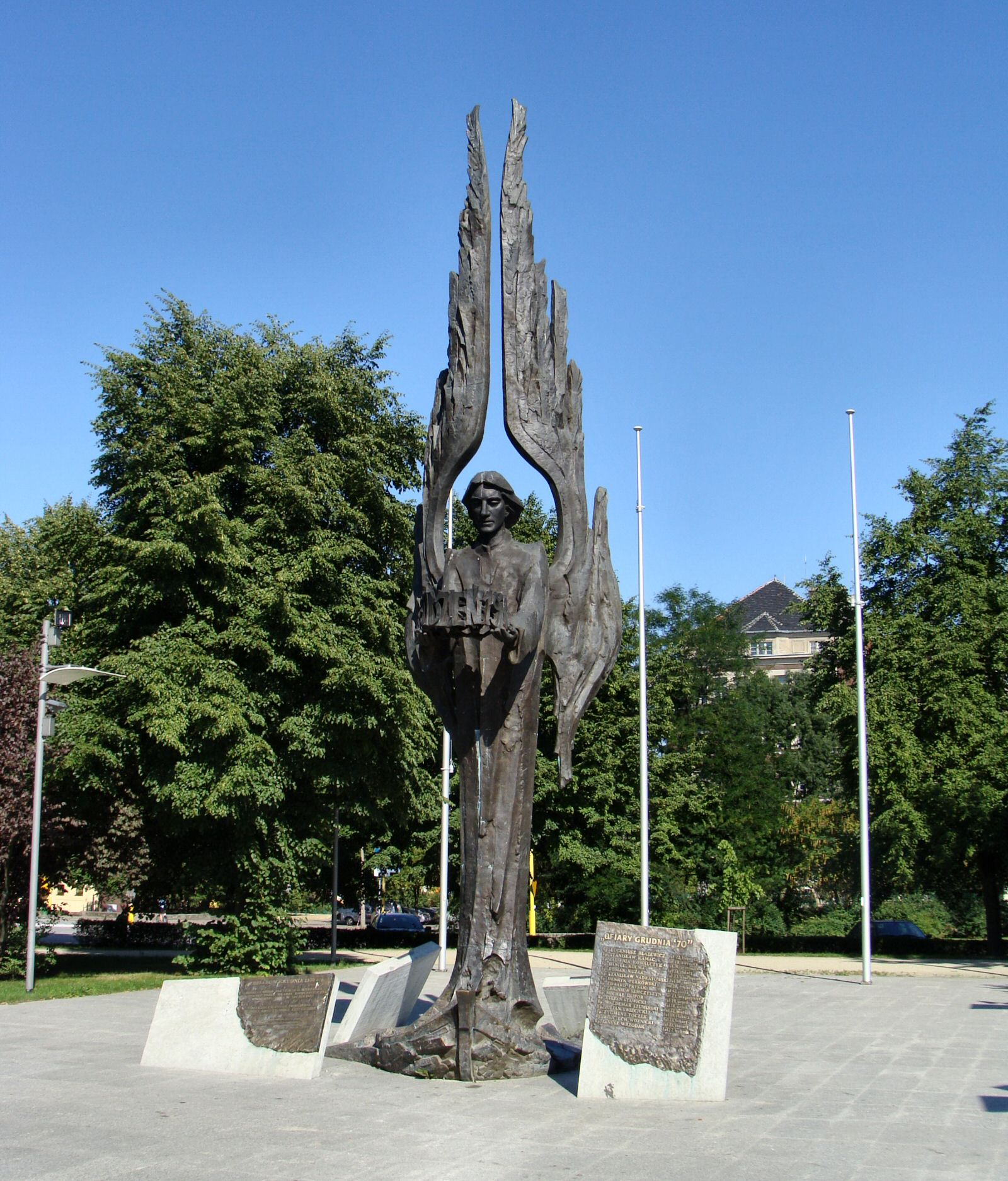
- The sculpture in 2009.
- Interactive map of Memorial to the Victims of December 1970
- Location: Solidarity Square, Szczecin, Poland
- Coordinates: 53°25′41.9″N 14°33′29.8″E
- Designer: Czesław Dźwigaj
- Type: Statue
- Material: Bronze
- Height: 11 m (36 ft)
- Opening date: 28 August 2005
- Dedicated to: Victims of the suppression of December 1970 protests in Szczecin

The Memorial to the Victims of December 1970 (Polish: Pomnik Ofiar Grudnia 1970), also colloquially known as the Angel of Freedom (Polish: Anioł Wolności), is a monument in Szczecin, Poland, placed at the Solidarity Square, within the Old Town neighbourhood. The monument is dedicated to the victims of the suppression of December 1970 protests in Szczecin. Made from bronze, it has a form of a statue of an angel, holding a crown of thorns forming a text which reads "Grudzień 1970" and translates from Polish to December 1970, and standing on a boat emerging from the ground. It was designed by Czesław Dźwigaj, and unveiled on 28 August 2005.

== History ==
The monument, dedicated to the victims of the suppression of December 1970 protests in Poland, was proposed by the Szczecin City Council and the Association of December '70 and January '71. It was financed by the city, the social fund, and with donations from the Polish diaspora in the United States. Its cornerstone was laid on 17 December 2003. The sculpture was designed by Czesław Dźwigaj, and unveiled on 28 August 2005, as part of the celebrations of the anniversary of the signing of the August Agreements.

== Overview ==
The monument has form of a bronze statue, with the height of 11 m, depicting an angel with its wings risen horizontally, holding a crown of thorns forming a text which reads "Grudzień 1970", translating from Polish to December 1970. They stands on a boat emerging from the ground, surrounded by four granite plaques, bearing the names of the victims, as well as the description of the events.

The statue is surrounded by four stone slabs, imbedded vertically into the pavement, each with a commemorative plaque. The first to the left in front of the monument says:

Polish text

Ofiarom grudnia 1970 r.
Pamięci ofiar pacyfikacji wybrzeża
dokonanej przez władze komunistyczne
w grudniu 1970 r. w Szczecinie
Walczyli o chleb powszedni,
zginęli, abyś Ty mógł żyć godnie

O, nie skończona dziejów jeszcze praca,
Nie przepalony jeszcze glob sumieniem!…
Cyprian K. Norwid, „Czasy”

Translation:
English translation

To the victims of December 1970
In memory to the victims of the Suppression of the Coast
Committed by the communist government
In December 1970 in Szczecin
They fought for their daily bread
And died for you to be able to live a decent life

Oh, the work of history is not yet finished,
The globe is not yet burned with conscience!…
Cyprian K. Norwid, Czasy [Times]

The second plaque, placed to the right in the front, says:

Polish text

„Ofiary Grudnia ‘70”
Śp. Eugeniusz Błażewicz lat 22, kierowca
Śp. Jadwiga Kowalczyk lat 16, uczennica
Śp. Daniel Kućma lat 24, stolarz
Śp. Roman Kużak lat 23, nauczyciel
Śp. Stanisław Nadratowski lat 20, żołnierz
Śp. Henryk Perkowski lat 20, szklarz
Śp. Edward Prysak lat 42, cieśla
Śp. Zbigniew Semczyszyn lat 23, magazynier
Śp. Michał Skipor lat 19, uczeń
Śp. Stefan Stawicki lat 16, uczeń
Śp. Waldemar Szumiński lat 22, murarz
Śp. Julian Święcicki lat 59, ślusarz
Śp. Zygmunt Toczek lat 23, tokarz
Śp. Wojciech Woźnicki lat 21, ślusarz
Śp. Janusz Wrzodak lat 27, technik

Translation:
English translation

"Victims of December '70"
Late Eugeniusz Błażewicz aged 22, driver
Late Jadwiga Kowalczyk aged 16, student
Late Daniel Kućma aged 24, carpenter
Late Roman Kużak aged 23, teacher
Late Stanisław Nadratowski aged 20, soldier
Late Henryk Perkowski aged 20, glazier
Late Edward Prysak aged 42, carpenter
Late Zbigniew Semczyszyn aged 23, storeman
Late Michał Skipor aged 19, student
Late Stefan Stawicki aged 16, student
Late Waldemar Szumiński aged 22, bricklayer
Late Julian Święcicki aged 59, locksmith
Late Zygmunt Toczek aged 23, turner
Late Wojciech Woźnicki aged 21, locksmith
Late Janusz Wrzodak aged 27, technician

The third plaque, placed to the left in the back, features the coat of arms of Szczecin, and an inscription which says:

Polish text

Mieszkańcy Szczecina w hołdzie
ofiarom grudnia 1970 roku
Szczecin, 17 grudnia 2005 r.

Translation:
English translation

Inhabitants of Szczecin honouring
the victims of December 1970
Szczecin, 17 December 2005

And the final plaque, placed to the right in the back, says:

Polish text

Pomnik ten powstał z inicjatywy Sowarzyszenia Społecznego
Grudzień ‘70 – Styczeń ’71,
staraniem prezydenta miasta Szczecina
oraz radnych miejskich kadencji 2002–2006,
Kurii metropolitarnej szczecińsko-kamieńskiej,
Polonii amerykańskiej z Nowego Jorku i St. Louis w Missouri

Translation:
English translation

This monument was created with the initiative of a Social Association of
December '70 and January '71
from the efforts of the mayor of Szczecin
and city councillors of the term 2002–2006,
Szczecin and Kamień Metropolitan Curia,
Polish Americans from New York City and St. Louis in Missouri
