= Occupation of Seoul =

Occupation of Seoul may refer to:

- Japanese occupation of Gyeongbokgung (1894), part of the First Sino-Japanese War
- Korea under Japanese rule (1910–1945)
- United States Army Military Government in Korea (1945–1948)
- North Korean occupation of South Korea (1950), part of the Korean War
