= Tolerance Monument =

Coordinates: 31.753341°N 35.237821°E

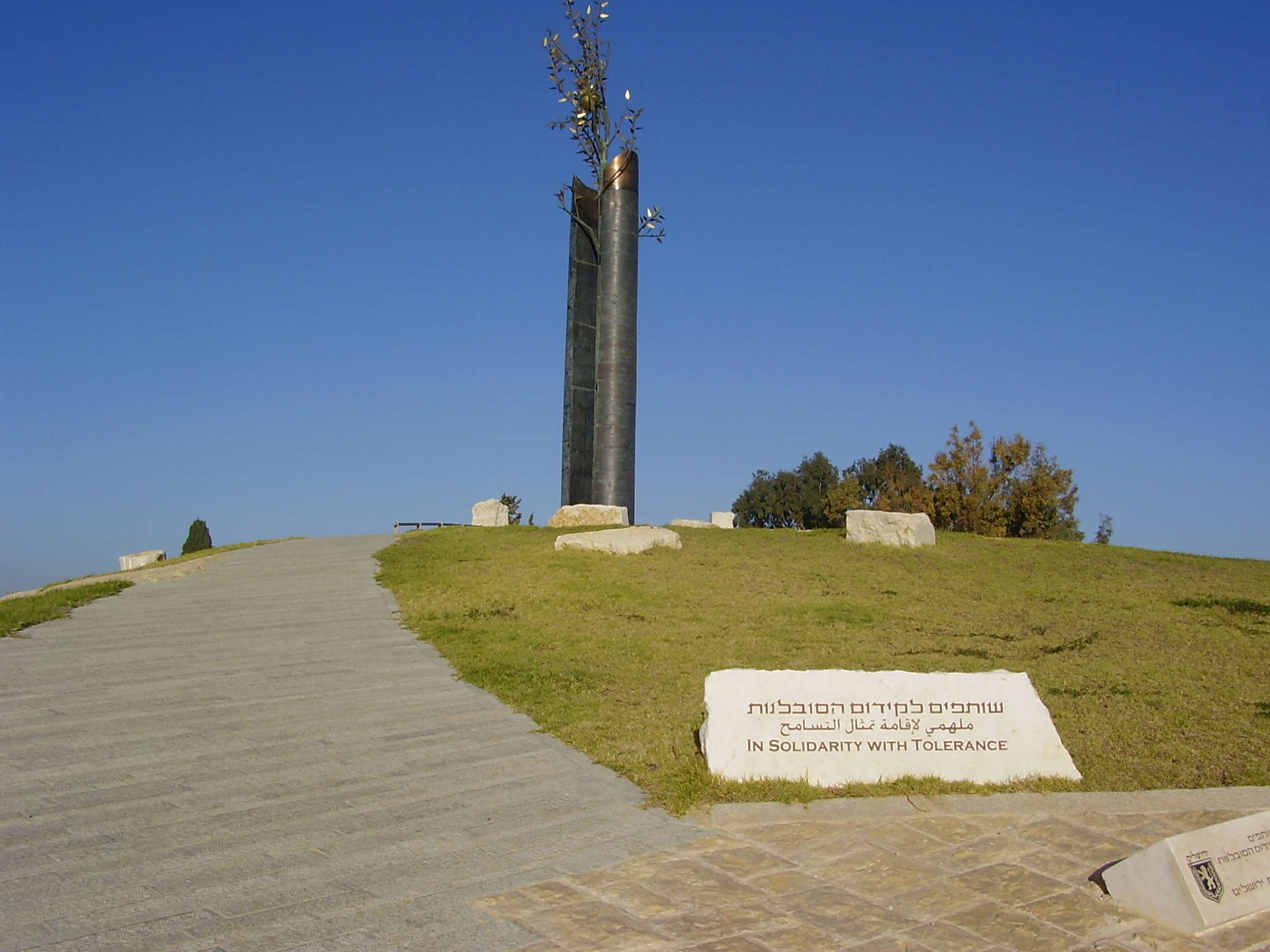
Tolerance Monument in Jerusalem with English, Hebrew and Arabic inscription "In Solidarity With Tolerance"

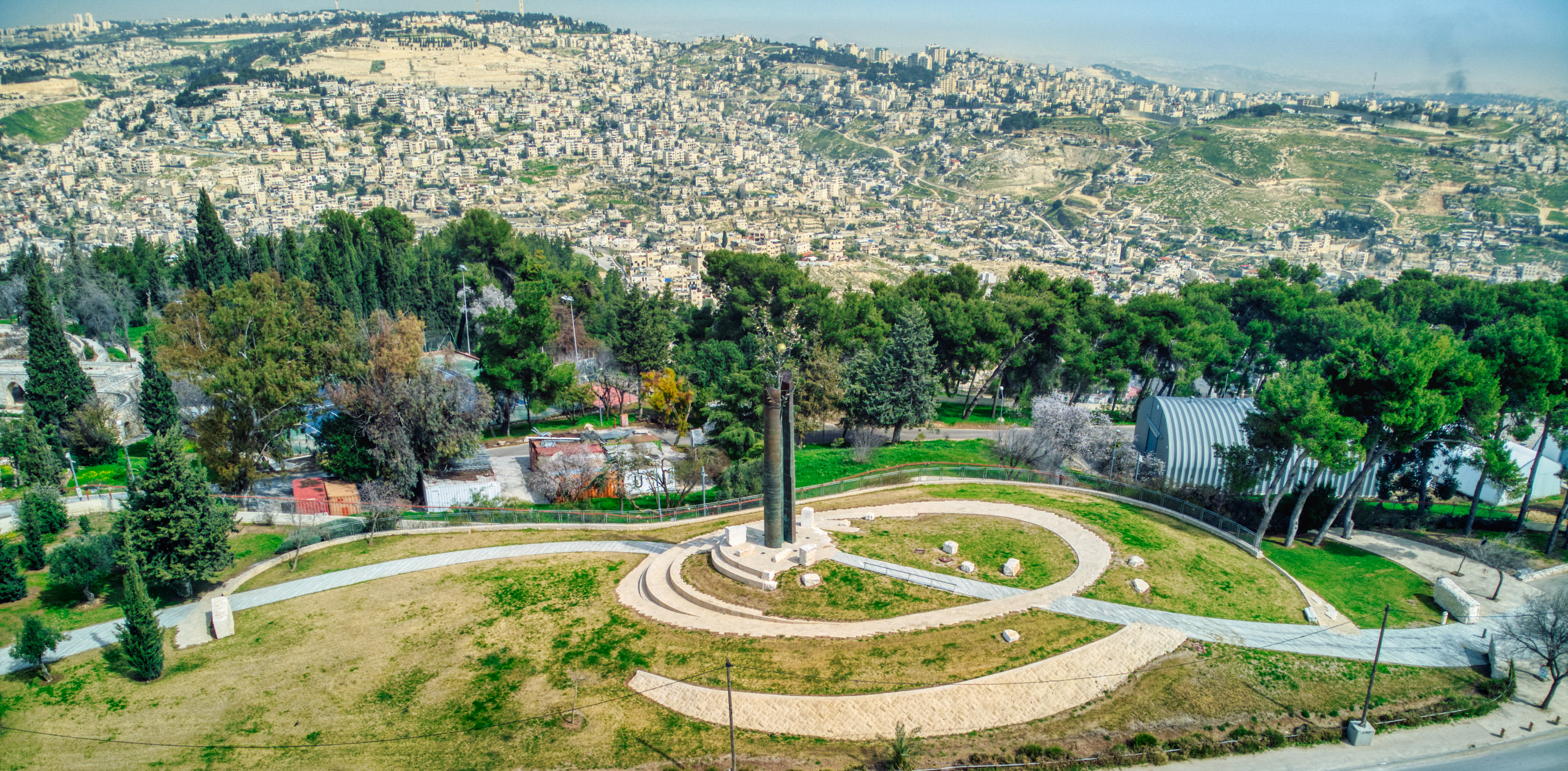
Tolerance Monument, Jerusalem

The Tolerance Monument (Hebrew פסל הסובלנות) is an outdoor sculpture located in a park near Goldman Promenade in Jerusalem.

== History ==
The monument was designed by Polish sculptor Czesław Dźwigaj, known for his religious art, in collaboration with sculptor Michal Kubiak. The project was funded by Polish businessman Aleksander Gudzowaty to promote peace and tolerance in the Israeli–Palestinian conflict.

There are three separate stones that circle around the statue, on each stone is inscribed in different languages of Arabic, English, and Hebrew, are the following words: "The monument is in the form of two halves of a broken column, which stand divided but still linked, on the ruins of a nameless and ageless temple. An olive tree grows in the middle of the split column and with its leaves seeks to encompass and shade both halves. The tree enables the two parts of the column to link together in symbolic coexistence. It cannot be known when the break will heal, when the two sides will grow back together but it can be seen that between the branches of the olive tree a new seed is sprouting, a golden grain of tolerance."

The monument is situated on a hill marking the divide between Jewish Armon HaNetziv and Arab Jabel Mukaber, just outside the United Nations headquarters.
