= Grzegorz Ślak =

Polish entrepreneur, lawyer, and a financier (born 1965)

- Born: 16 May 1965 (age 61)
- Occupations: President of the Management Board of Wratislavia Biodiesel S.A. President of the Management Board of Akwawit-Polmos S.A. President of the Management Board of Bartimpex S.A.

Grzegorz Andrzej Ślak (born 16 May 1965 in Ostrzeszów) - Polish entrepreneur, lawyer (specializing in excise duties), and a financier.

== Career ==
Ślak started his career at Bank Przemysłowo-Handlowy in Rybnik, where he was involved mainly in financing and restructuring energy, steel and mining-related companies.

In 2002 he became the President of the management board of Rafineria Trzebinia.

As the first person in Poland, he has "built" a facility for producing higher fatty acid methyl esters ('biofuels') and pharmaceutical glycerine, thus becoming "the pioneer of Polish biofuels".

In 2005, he "built" the first plant for hydrorefining of purified paraffin in Central and Eastern Europe under license by Exxon Mobil. The plant allowed the use of petroleum processing products (paraffin) in pharmaceutical, cosmetic and food industries.

In 2005, he developed a new technology and started to produce a new fuel, trade name "ON BIO 10", consisting of diesel oil and 20% addition of higher fatty acid methyl esters. On this basis, the Minister of Economy adopted the quality standard for this fuel which is still in effect. For this product, Rafineria Trzebinia was awarded the Promotional Emblem “Teraz Polska” in 2006.

In June 2006, Ślak was accused of reducing the payable excise duties for the unprecedented amount of PLN 760 million in connection with his duties as the President of the management board of Rafineria Trzebinia. After two years, tax authorities confirmed accuracy of the settlements, thus accepting correctness of the tax rate applied by Ślak.

In 2006, he became the President of the management board of Skotan S.A., leading the company to one of its biggest stock increases on the Warsaw Stock Exchange.

In 2008, he became the President of the management board of Bioeton S.A. In this company, he carried out a capital investment which allowed for the takeover of BDK Kyritz GmbH, a German renewable energy company. In 2009, he became the President of the management board of BDK Kyritz GmbH in Germany. Ślak restructured the company, which involved restoring its financial liquidity. At that time, the company was in the state of so-called "temporary bankruptcy".

In July 2011 he took up the position of the President of the management board of Wratislavia Biodiesel S.A., a part of Bartimpex S.A capital group, which produces methyl esters and higher fatty acids (biodiesel), as well as raw and pharmaceutical glycerine. At the time of Ślak's taking up of the position, the company had not been operating due to a lack of contracts. As a result of his restructuring, Wratislavia Biodiesel S.A. generated a 7-digit net profit for the year 2012. At the same time, Ślak carried out an investment in bioethanol dehydrated spirit production plant, thus expanding the company's economic activity. The successful restructuring enabled the company to begin an application process for entering the stock market at the beginning of 2015.

As the President of the management board and a shareholder of Wratislavia Biodiesel S.A., Ślak has been carrying out work to build a plant for producing third-generation algae fuels. It is planned to be the first algae fuel plant in Europe.

Since October 2011, Ślak has been simultaneously holding the post of the President of the management board of Akwawit-Polmos S.A. (also a part of Bartimpex S.A capital group) - a producer of spirits and vodkas. At the time of Ślak's taking up of the position, the company had fulfilled all the legal requirements to file for bankruptcy.

In 2012, his actions resulted in signing agreements with world-scale alcohol producers: one with Brown-Forman (the owner of Jack Daniels and Finlandia brands) for the production of Maximus vodka and another with Diageo (the owner of Johnnie Walker and Baileys) for the production of Smirnoff vodka. As a result of the financial restructuring, the company is planning to enter the stock market in 2016.

As part of the restructuring process, Ślak carried out an investment in Poland's most modern alcohol production line licensed by CFT Packaging S.A. The line is able to produce 100 million bottles a year, which increases the overall productivity of Akwawit-Polmos S.A. to 150 million bottles a year, thus placing the company among the biggest alcohol producers in Central-Eastern Europe.

In 2013, he replaced the deceased Aleksander Gudzowaty as the President of the management board of Bartimpex S.A.

Ślak is the President of the management board and a shareholder of HGBS Finanse S.A, a fund investing in new technology and "excise business" enterprises.

In his career, he has been or is a member of the following supervisory boards (among others): Orlen Oil S.A, J.W. Construction S.A., Orlen Asfalt S.A, Polonia Warszawa S.A., Euronaft Sp. z o.o.

=== Dispute over the offset agreement ===
In April 2003, the Polish government signed an agreement with the U.S. for purchase of 48 F-16 jets for US$3.5 million. In exchange, the Americans agreed, among others, to invest in Poland's economy and help Polish enterprises to invest in the American market. They failed to fulfill the latter point. In 2014, carrying out the duties of the President of Bartimpex Management Board, Grzegorz Ślak led the company to reach a settlement with Lockheed Martin under which the Polish company was awarded several million dollars in damages. Bartimpex was the only legal entity in Poland to have been awarded damages for the unfulfilled offset agreement conditions.

=== The Yamal–Europe gas pipeline ===
Grzegorz Ślak initiated the PGNiG takeover of the part of the Yamal–Europe gas pipeline that goes through Poland. The transaction enabled PGNiG to take over 4% of the shares, which gave it advantage over Gazprom (52% to 48%) and guaranteed the Polish party the decisive vote on the most significant matters concerning EuropolGaz, the owner of the pipeline.

== Awards ==
He was awarded the Silver Cross of Merit for contributions to the development of oil industry pursuant to the Polish President's Decree of 4 June 2003.

He received "Man of the year 2005" Medal awarded by Gazeta Krakowska for "professionalism in company management, introducing innovative technologies, effectiveness in winning new markets and supporting culture and sport".

== Community involvement ==
He funded two ultrasound devices which allow for earlier cancer detection for the Department of Internal Medicine, Occupational Diseases and Occupational Hypertension of University Teaching Hospital in Wrocław.

He funded a gamma camera used for an effective thyroid examination for the Department of Endocrinology in Zabrze.

He funded a device which facilitates performing cancer surgery in children for the Department of Pediatric Surgery and Urology of Wrocław Medical University.

== Hobbies ==
Ślak is an avid enthusiast of football and motorcycle speedway. In 2004 and 2005, he led the speedway team Unia Tarnów to its first in history title of the winner of Team Speedway Polish Championship.

For many years, he has been connected with Polish speedway rider Tomasz Gollob, who officially handed the 2010 gold medal for winning Individual Speedway World Championship over to Ślak. In 2010, he also wrote a book, entitled Why only now?! Gollob as the world champion. A true story.

In 2008, he carried out a capital transaction which led to the takeover of Groclin Dyskobolia Grodzisk Wielkopolski. by the shareholder of J.W. As a result, the club changed its name to Polonia Warszawa and the registered seat to the city of Warsaw. It was the first transaction of this sort and so far one of a kind on the top level of Polish football events.

He acts as a speedway expert and Grand Prix commentator on Canal+.
