= Aleksander Gudzowaty =

Polish businessman and economist (1938–2013)

- Born: 22 September 1938; Łódź, Poland
- Died: 14 February 2013 (aged 74)
- Occupation: Economist
- Spouse: Danuta Korycka
- Children: Tomasz Gudzowaty, Michał Gudzowaty
- Parent(s): Eliasz Gudzowaty; Aleksandra Gudzowata

Aleksander Gudzowaty (22 September 1938 – 14 February 2013) was a Polish businessman and economist, and one of Poland's wealthiest people.

== Biography ==
Gudzowaty graduated from the Faculty of Foreign Trade at the University of Łódź. From 1975 to 1979, he acted for two leading Polish foreign trade enterprises representing the entire Polish textile industry in Moscow. From 1978 to 1993, he served as Director General of PHZ Kolmex S.A. - a railway sector company; during that time he executed one of their largest contracts ever to supply freight wagons for Iraqi Railways. Having left PHZ Kolmex S.A., in 1992 Gudzowaty set up the Bartimpex commodity trading operation, and in so doing leveraged his Russian relationships. He had vast experience in trade with the Middle East, the CIS and Russia. He was listed by Forbes magazine as one of the wealthiest and most influential people in the Central and Eastern Europe.

His attempt to diversify into financial services ended after JV along with US insurer Cigna were dissolved and the bank BWE was divested to the private equity firm Innova Capital. Industrial assets controlled by Gudzowaty included Akwawit-Brasco, the alcohol and biofuel producer, which was acquired in a controversial privatisation deal.

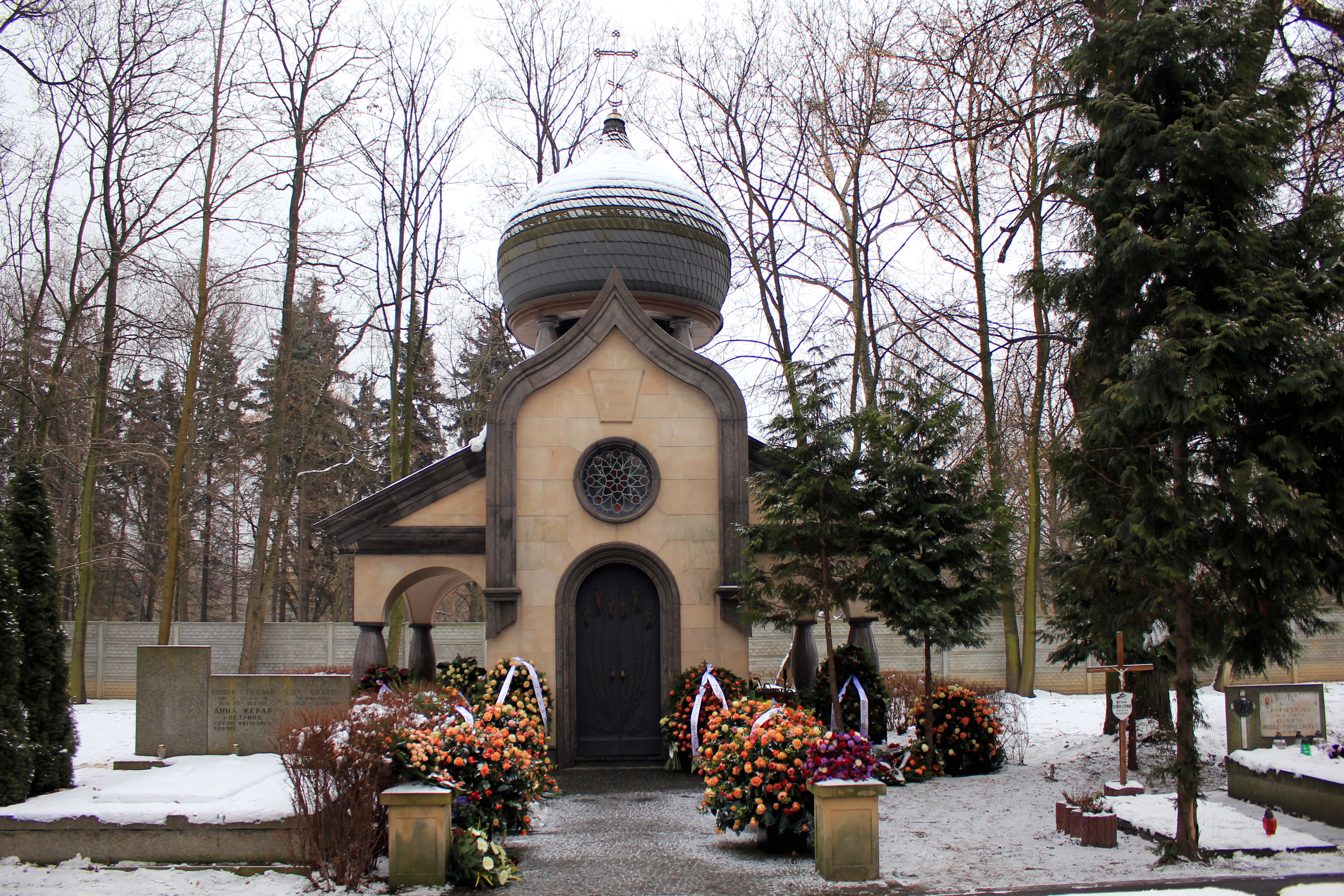
The Gudzowaty Family Cenotaph a day after Gudzowaty's funeral, fot. Ivonna Nowicka

Gudzowaty was involved in funding the Tolerance Monument which is being raised in Jerusalem by sculptors Michał Kubiak and Czesław Dźwigaj.

Gudzowaty died on 14 February 2013 at the age of 74.

== See also ==
- Oleksy tapes
- Józef Oleksy
- Grzegorz Ślak
