= Jordanian annexation of the West Bank =

1950 annexation event

West Bank الضفة الغربية Aḍ-Ḍiffah l-Ġarbiyyah
- 1950–1967
- Flag Coat of arms

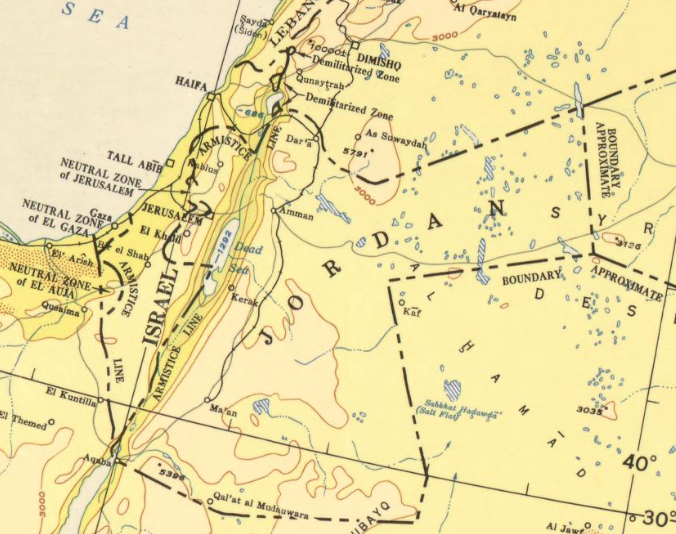
- Contemporary map, 1955
- Status: Area annexed by the Hashemite Kingdom of Jordan
- Capital: East Jerusalem (de facto)
- Common languages: Arabic (Palestinian Arabic); Western Armenian; Domari
- Religion: Sunni Islam (majority); Christianity (minority)
- History
  - Annexation: 24 April 1950
  - Six-Day War: 5–10 June 1967
  - Surrender of Jordanian claims: 31 July 1988
- Currency: Jordanian dinar Palestine pound (until October 1950)
Preceded by	Succeeded by
Mandatory Palestine	Israeli occupation of the West Bank
- Today part of: Israeli occupation of the West Bank, claimed by Palestine, widely recognized as Palestinian territory. (Note: Since capturing the West Bank in the 1967 Six-Day War, Israel has held the entirety of the territory under belligerent occupation. East Jerusalem was effectively annexed by Israel, however Israeli sovereignty over East Jerusalem is widely unrecognized.)

The Jordanian administration of the West Bank officially began on 24 April 1950, following the 1948 Arab–Israeli War, when Transjordan occupied and subsequently annexed the portion of Mandatory Palestine that became known as the West Bank, including East Jerusalem. The territory remained under Jordanian control until it de facto ended upon the West Bank being occupied by Israel during the 1967 Six-Day War. Jordanian administration de jure ended when Jordan renounced its claim to the territory on 31 July 1988. (Note: The term "West Bank" was first used by the British Foreign Office and by the Jordanians towards the second half of 1949.)

During the December 1948 Jericho Conference, hundreds of Palestinian notables in the West Bank gathered, accepted Jordanian rule and recognized King Abdullah I as ruler. The West Bank was formally annexed on 24 April 1950, but the annexation was widely considered as illegal and void by most of the international community, including the Arab League, which ultimately decided to treat Jordan as a temporary trustee pending future settlement. Recognition of Jordan's declaration of annexation was granted only by the United Kingdom, Iraq, and possibly Pakistan. The United States while avoiding public approval, also recognized this extension of Jordanian sovereignty, except for Jerusalem.

When Jordan transferred its full citizenship rights to the residents of the West Bank, the annexation more than tripled the population of Jordan, going from 400,000 to 1,300,000. The naturalized Palestinians were given half of the seats of the Jordanian parliament.

== Background ==
=== Partition and 1947/48 diplomacy ===
Prior to hostilities in 1948, Mandatory Palestine (modern-day West Bank, Gaza Strip and Israel) had been administered by the British Empire pursuant to the Mandate for Palestine, having captured it from the Ottomans in 1917. The British, as custodians of the land, implemented the land tenure laws in Palestine, which it had inherited from the Ottomans (as defined in the Ottoman Land Code of 1858). Toward the expiration of the British Mandate, Arabs aspired to independence and self-determination, as did the Jews of the country.

On 29 November 1947 the UN General Assembly passed Resolution 181 which envisaged the division of Palestine into three parts: an Arab State, a Jewish State and the City of Jerusalem. The proposed Arab State would include the central and part of western Galilee, with the town of Acre, the hill country of Samaria and Judea, an enclave at Jaffa, and the southern coast stretching from north of Isdud (now Ashdod) and encompassing what is now the Gaza Strip, with a section of desert along the Egyptian border. The proposed Jewish State would include the fertile Eastern Galilee, the Coastal Plain, stretching from Haifa to Rehovot and most of the Negev desert. The Jerusalem Corpus separatum was to include Bethlehem and the surrounding areas. The proposed Jewish State covered 56.47% of Mandatory Palestine (excluding Jerusalem) with a population of 498,000 Jews and 325,000 Arabs while the proposed Arab State covered 43.53% of Mandatory Palestine (excluding Jerusalem), with 807,000 Arab inhabitants and 10,000 Jewish inhabitants and in Jerusalem, an international trusteeship regime where the population was 100,000 Jews and 105,000 Arabs.

In March 1948, the British Cabinet had agreed that the civil and military authorities in Palestine should make no effort to oppose the setting up of a Jewish State or a move into Palestine from Transjordan. The United States, together with the United Kingdom, favoured the annexation by Transjordan. The UK preferred to permit King Abdullah to annex the territory at the earliest date, while the United States preferred to wait until after the conclusion of negotiations brokered by the Palestine Conciliation Commission.

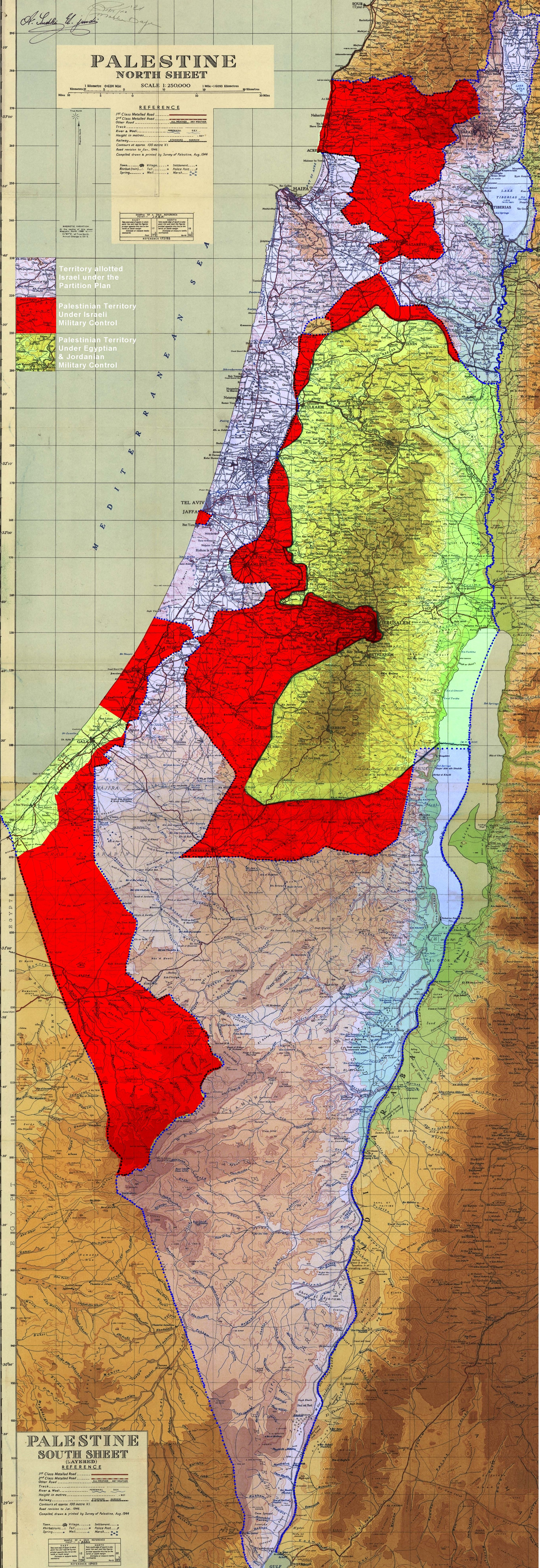
Armistice Demarcation Lines, 1949–1967: Israel, 15 May 1948; Allotted for Arab state and the Corpus Separatum of Jerusalem-Bethlehem, occupied by Egypt Feb 1949/Jordan Apr 1949; Allotted for Arab state and the Corpus Separatum of Jerusalem-Bethlehem, occupied by Israel Feb/Apr 1949

=== Entry of Transjordan forces into Mandate Palestine ===
Following the end of the British Mandate for Palestine and Israel's declaration of independence on 14 May 1948, the Arab Legion, under the leadership of Sir John Bagot Glubb, known as Glubb Pasha, was ordered to enter Mandatory Palestine and secure the UN-designated Arab area.

=== Armistice ===
By the end of the war, Jordanian forces had control over the West Bank, including East Jerusalem. On 3 April 1949, Israel and Jordan signed an armistice agreement. The main points included:

- Jordanian forces remained in most positions they held in the West Bank, including East Jerusalem and the Old City.
- Jordan withdrew its forces from its front posts overlooking the Sharon plain. In return, Israel agreed to allow Jordanian forces to take over positions in the West Bank previously held by Iraqi forces.
- A Special Committee was to be formed to make arrangements for safe movement of traffic between Jerusalem and the Mount Scopus campus of the Hebrew University of Jerusalem, along the Latrun-Jerusalem Highway, free access to the Holy Places, and other matters. The committee was never formed, and access to the Holy Places was denied to Israelis.

The remainder of the area designated as part of an Arab state under the UN Partition Plan was partly occupied by Egypt (Gaza Strip), and partly occupied and annexed by Israel (West Negev, West Galilee, Jaffa). The intended international enclave of Jerusalem was divided between Israel and Jordan.

== Jordanian occupation and annexation ==
=== The road to annexation ===
After the invasion, Jordan began making moves to perpetuate the Jordanian occupation over the Arab part of Palestine. King Abdullah appointed governors on his behalf in the Arab cities of Ramallah, Hebron, Nablus, Bethlehem and the Arab controlled part of Jerusalem, that were captured by Legion in the invasion. These governors were mostly Palestinians (including Aref al-Aref, Ibrahim Hashem and Ahmed Hilmi Pasha), and the Jordanians described them as "military" governors, so that it would not anger the other Arab states, which opposed Jordan's plans to incorporate the Arab part of Palestine into the kingdom. The king made other smaller moves towards the annexation of the West Bank: He ordered Palestinian policemen to wear the uniforms of the Jordanian police and its symbols; he instituted the use of Jordanian postage stamps instead of the British ones; Palestinian municipalities were not allowed to collect taxes and issue licenses; and the radio of Ramallah called the locals to disobey the instructions of pro-Husseini officials and obey those of the Jordanian-backed governors.

The December 1948 Jericho Conference, a meeting of prominent Palestinian leaders convened by King Abdullah I voted in favor of annexation into what was then Transjordan. Transjordan became the Hashemite Kingdom of Jordan on 26 April 1949. Military occupation concluded on 2 November 1949 via promulgation of the Law Amending Public Administration Law in Palestine whereby the laws of Palestine were declared to remain applicable. In the Jordanian parliament, the West and East Banks received 30 seats each, having roughly equal populations. The first elections were held on 11 April 1950. Although the West Bank had not yet been annexed, its residents were permitted to vote.

=== Annexation ===
A 1949 amendment to the British Mandate's 1928 Nationality Law effectively imposed Jordanian citizenship on the region's 420,000 local Palestinians, 280,000 Palestinian refugees in the West Bank and 70,000 Palestinian refugees in the East Bank, ahead of formal annexation on 24 April 1950. Then in 1954, Jordan's Nationality Law clarified the conditions under which Palestinian Arabs could obtain Jordanian citizenship.

Unlike any other Arab country to which they fled after the 1948 Arab–Israeli War, Palestinian refugees in the West Bank (and on the East Bank) were given Jordanian citizenship on the same basis as existing residents. Elihu Lauterpacht described it as a move that "entirely lacked legal justification." The annexation formed part of Jordan's "Greater Syria Plan" expansionist policy, and in response, Saudi Arabia, Lebanon and Syria joined Egypt in demanding Jordan's expulsion from the Arab League. A motion to expel Jordan from the League was prevented by the dissenting votes of Yemen and Iraq. On 12 June 1950, the Arab League declared the annexation was a temporary, practical measure and that Jordan was holding the territory as a "trustee" pending a future settlement. On 27 July 1953, King Hussein of Jordan announced that East Jerusalem was "the alternative capital of the Hashemite Kingdom" and would form an "integral and inseparable part" of Jordan. In an address to parliament in Jerusalem in 1960, Hussein called the city the "second capital of the Hashemite Kingdom of Jordan".

Only the United Kingdom formally recognized the annexation of the West Bank, de facto in the case of East Jerusalem. In 1950, the British extended formal recognition to the union between the Hashemite Kingdom and that part of Palestine under Jordanian control - with the exception of Jerusalem. The British government stated that it regarded the provisions of the Anglo-Jordan Treaty of Alliance of 1948 as applicable to all the territory included in the union. The United States Department of State also recognized this extension of Jordanian sovereignty. Pakistan is claimed to have recognized Jordan's annexation too, but this is disputed. Despite Arab League opposition, the inhabitants of the West Bank became citizens of Jordan.

Tensions continued between Jordan and Israel through the early 1950s, with Palestinian guerrillas and Israeli commandos crossing the Green Line. Abdullah I of Jordan, who had become Emir of Transjordan in 1921 and King in 1923, was assassinated in July 1951 during a visit to the Jami Al-Aqsa on the Temple Mount in East Jerusalem by a Palestinian gunman following rumours that he was discussing a peace treaty with Israel. The trial found that this assassination had been planned by Colonel Abdullah el-Tell, ex-military governor of Jerusalem, and Musa Abdullah Husseini. He was succeeded by his son Talal and then his grandson Hussein.

=== Access to holy sites ===
Clauses in the 3 April 1949 Armistice Agreements specified that Israelis would have access to the religious sites in East Jerusalem. However, Jordan refused to implement this clause, arguing that Israel's refusal to permit the return of Palestinians to their homes in West Jerusalem voided that clause in the agreement. Tourists entering East Jerusalem had to present baptismal certificates or other proof they were not Jewish.

The special committee that was to make arrangements for visits to holy places was never formed and Israelis, irrespective of religion, were barred from entering the Old City and other holy sites. Significant parts of the Jewish Quarter, much of it severely damaged in the war, together with synagogues such as the Hurva Synagogue, which had also been used as a military base in the conflict, were destroyed. It was said that some gravestones from the Jewish cemetery on the Mount of Olives had been used for construction, paving roads and to build latrines for a nearby Jordanian army barracks. The Jordanians immediately expelled all the Jewish residents of East Jerusalem. Mark Tessler cites John Oesterreicher as writing that during Jordanian rule, "34 out of the Old City's 35 synagogues were dynamited. Some were turned into stables, others into chicken coops."

== Aftermath ==
=== Six-Day War and end of Jordanian control ===
By the end of the Six-Day War, the formerly Jordanian-controlled West Bank with its one million Palestinian population had come under Israeli military occupation. About 300,000 Palestinian refugees were expelled or fled to Jordan. After 1967, all religious groups were granted administration over their own holy sites, while administration of the Temple Mount – sacred to Jews, Christians, and Muslims – remained in the hands of the Jerusalem Islamic Waqf.

=== Jordanian disengagement ===
Following the Six-Day War in 1967, Israel occupied the West Bank (including East Jerusalem). Although the sides were technically at war, a policy known as "open bridges" meant that Jordan continued to pay salaries and pensions to civil servants and to provide services to endowments and educational affairs and in general to play an active role in West Bank affairs.

In 1972, King Hussein conceived a plan to establish a united Arab federation which would include the West Bank and Jordan. This proposal never came to fruition.

In 1974, the Arab League decided to recognize the Palestine Liberation Organization (PLO) as the sole legitimate representative of the Palestinian people. The decision forced King Hussein to relinquish his claim to speak for the Palestinian people during peace negotiations and to recognize an independent Palestinian state that is independent of Jordan.

On 28 July 1988, King Hussein announced the cessation of a $1.3 billion development program for the West Bank. He explained that the aim of this move was to allow the PLO to take more responsibility for these territories. Two days later the king dissolved Jordan's lower house of parliament, half of whose members represented constituencies in the Israeli-occupied West Bank.

On 31 July 1988, King Hussein announced the severance of all legal and administrative ties with the West Bank, except for the Jordanian sponsorship of the Muslim and Christian holy sites in Jerusalem, and recognised the PLO as "the sole legitimate representative of the Palestinian people". In his speech to the nation held on that day he announced his decision and explained that this decision was made with the aim of helping the Palestinian people establishing their own independent state.

The 1993 Oslo Accords between the PLO and Israel "opened the road for Jordan to proceed on its own negotiating track with Israel." The Washington Declaration was initialled one day after the Oslo Accords were signed. "On July 25, 1994, King Hussein met with Israeli Prime Minister Rabin in the Rose Garden of the White House, where they signed the Washington Declaration, formally ending the 46-year state of war between Jordan and Israel." Finally, on 26 October 1994, Jordan signed the Israel–Jordan peace treaty, which normalised relations between the two countries and resolved territorial disputes between them.

The Jordanian government's decision to disengage is criticized, despite official justifications that it responded to the PLO's request and aimed to thwart Israeli attempts to make Jordan an alternative homeland for Palestinians. However, these justifications are currently described as weak due to the decision's disastrous consequences. The move terminated the status of West Bank Palestinians as Jordanian citizens with a state to defend them, revoked their citizenship and national identification numbers, and left them without a diplomatic umbrella of protection from a sovereign state, while imposing restrictions on their movement and residency.

== Gallery ==
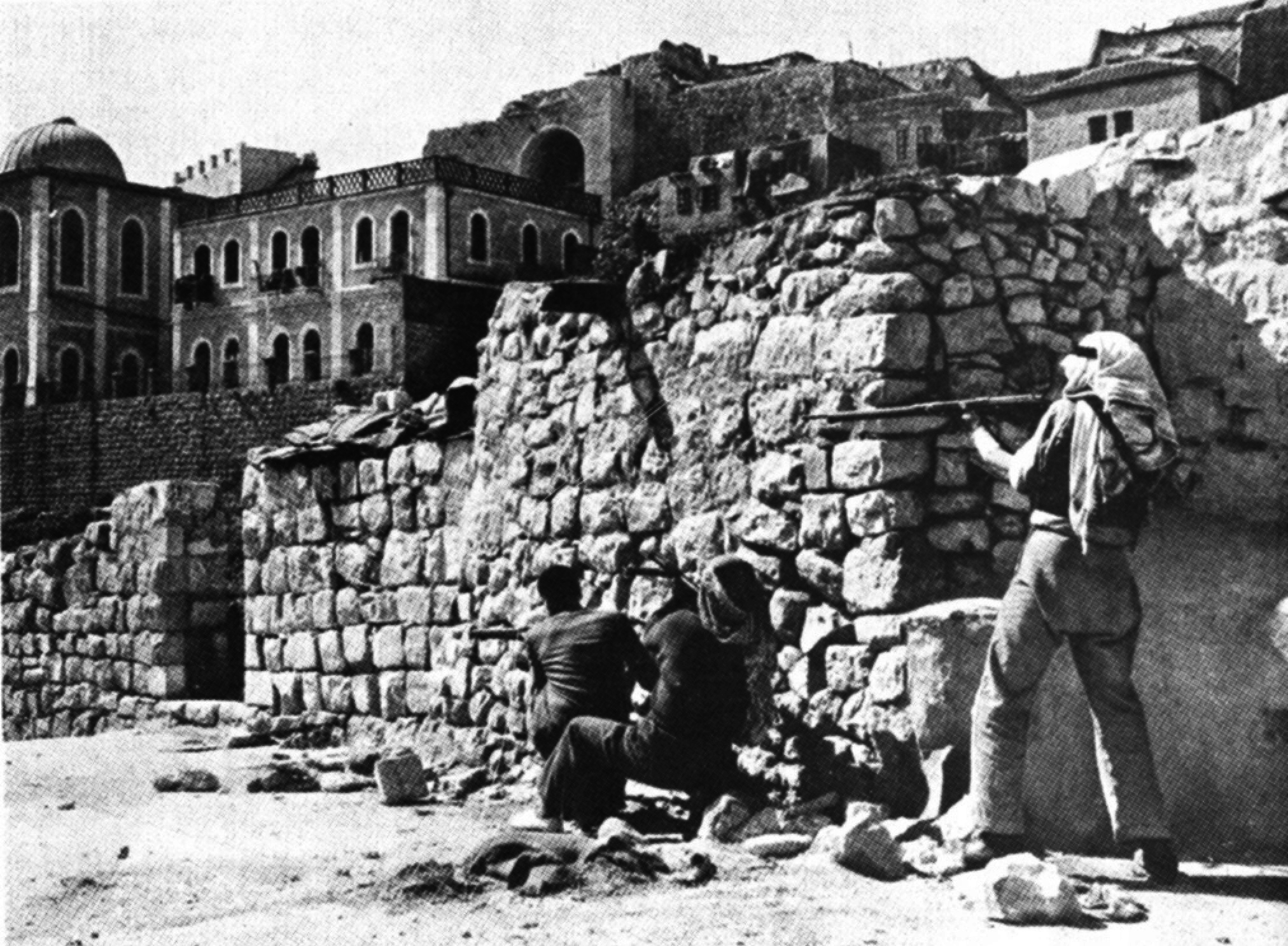
Arab Legionnaires attacking Porat Yosef Yeshiva, Old City of Jerusalem, 1948

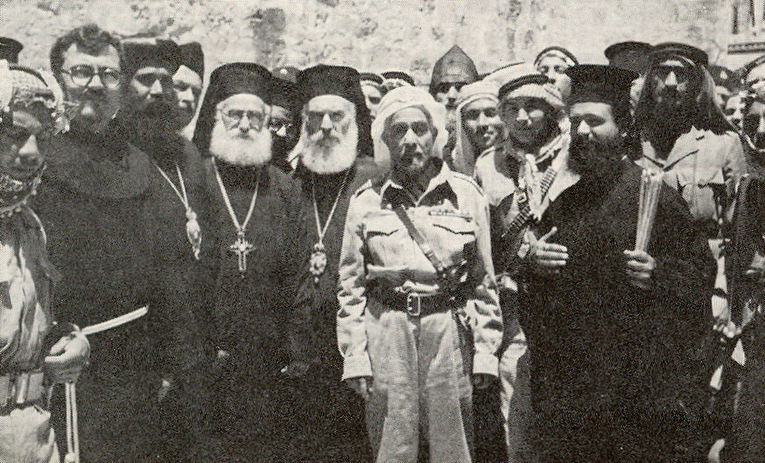
King Abdullah at Church of the Holy Sepulchre, 29 May 1948

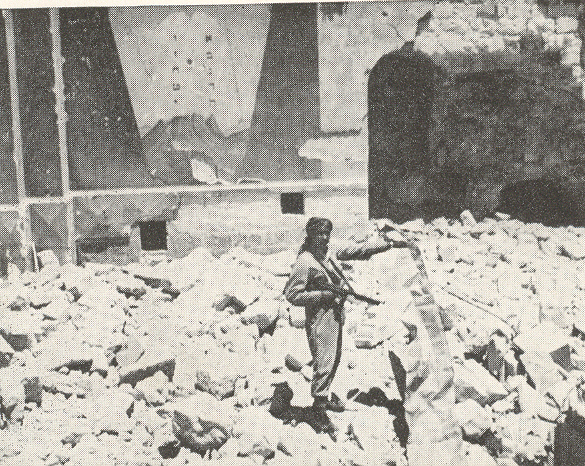
Arab Legion soldier standing in the ruins of the Hurva Synagogue, Jerusalem

Announcement in the UK House of Commons of the recognition of the State of Israel and also of the annexation of the West Bank by the State of Jordan

== See also ==
- List of East Jerusalem locations
- List of military occupations
- Occupation of the Gaza Strip by Egypt
- Israeli occupation of the West Bank
