= Nof Zion =

Israeli settlement in the West Bank

Coordinates: 31°45′11.65″N 35°14′34″E

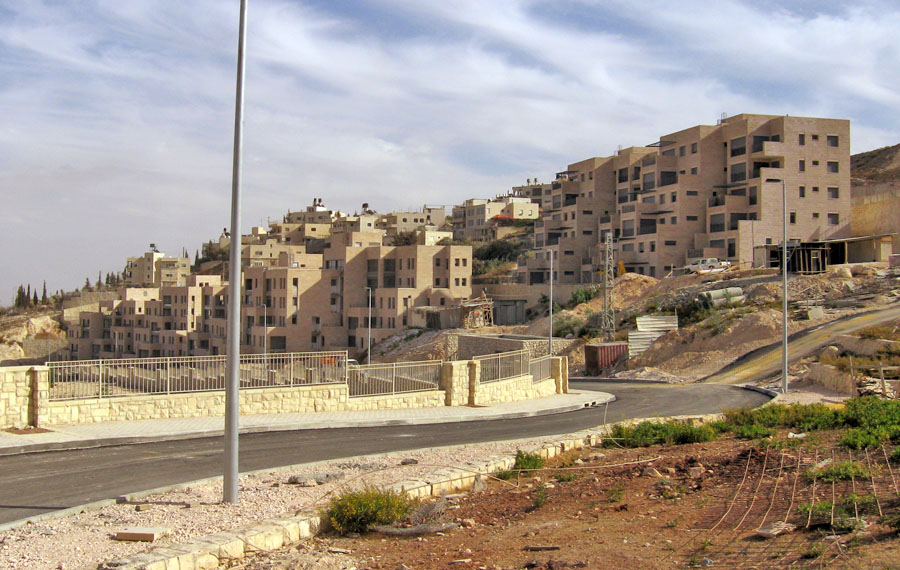
Nof Zion neighborhood

Nof Zion (Hebrew: נוף ציון. lit. 'Zion View') is a Jewish religious neighborhood and an Israeli settlement inside of the Palestinian Arab neighborhood of Jabel Mukaber, East Jerusalem.

The international community considers Israeli settlements in East Jerusalem illegal under international law, but the Israeli government disputes this.

== History ==
Nof Zion is an apartment complex built on privately owned land bought by an Israeli developer over several years. The Supreme Court of Israel rejected an appeal from local Arab residents who had claimed some of the land belonged to them. Upon completion, the neighborhood is planned to include 480 apartments.

According to ARIJ, Israel confiscated 140 dunams of land from the Palestinian village of Jabel Mukaber in order to construct Nof Zion.

In 2011, the Palestinian American businessman Bashar Masri offered to buy the remaining lands from the struggling Israeli company Digal Investments and Holdings, aiming to convert the neighborhood into a development for Arab families. At the time, Digal had built about 90 of the 400 planned religious-only apartments but slow sales resulted in debt problems. Masri planned to sell the remaining units to Palestinians who he said "face serious housing shortage due to discriminatory Israeli policies." The Los Angeles Times reported that Masri's US$36 million offer was rejected after pressure from right-wing Jewish groups. An unspecified offer from Israeli businessman Rami Levy was accepted.
