= Oleksy tapes =

2000s political scandal in Poland

The Oleksy tapes are tapes secretly recorded during a 2006 conversation between Józef Oleksy and Aleksander Gudzowaty. In the recordings, former Democratic Left Alliance (SLD) Prime Minister Józef Oleksy denounces colleagues, and reveals shady aspects of Polish political life. The recordings were published by Polish media in 2007.

The tapes are one of the factors responsible for the decline in popularity of Polish post-communist parties, especially the SLD.
