= List of East Jerusalem locations =

Map of Jerusalem areas. In green : Arab colonies. In dark blue : Jewish colonies

This is a list of locations in Jerusalem sometimes described by the term East Jerusalem:

== Locations in Jordanian municipality (1949–1967) ==
The following locations were included within the borders of the Jordanian municipality in the eastern part of the city between 1949 and 1967:

- American Colony
- The Garden Tomb
- Bab a-Zahara
- Old City of Jerusalem
  - Armenian Quarter
  - Christian Quarter
  - Jewish Quarter
  - Muslim Quarter
- Sheikh Jarrah
- Silwan (added in Jordan's 1961 municipal expansion)
- Wadi al-Joz

== Locations in expanded Jerusalem municipality (1967–present) ==
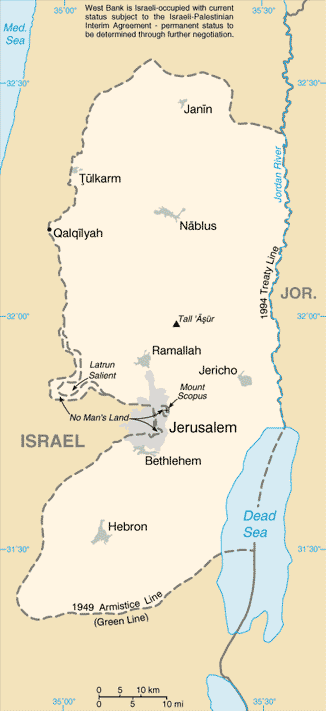
Jerusalem and the West Bank.

The following locations were included within the borders of the Israeli municipality after its expansion following the 1967 Six-Day War, formalised in the 1980 Israeli Jerusalem Law:

- At-Tur
- Beit Hanina
- Beit Safafa
- Jabel Mukaber
- Jebel Batan al-Hawa
- Kafr 'Aqab
- Ras al-Amud
- Sawahra al-Arbiya
- Sharafat
- Shuafat
- Sur Baher
- Umm Tuba
