= Battles of La Güera and Tichla =

Battles fought between Mauritania and the Polisario Front during the Western Sahara War

- Part of the Western Sahara War
Date	10–22 December 1975 (1 week and 5 days)
Location	La Güera and Tichla, Spanish Sahara
Result	Mauritanian victory
Territorial changes	Occupation of La Güera and Tichla by Mauritania.

Belligerents
Mauritania; Morocco	(Sahrawi Arab Democratic Republic) Polisario Front

Commanders and leaders
Mohamed Ould Bah Ould Abdelkader	Mohamed Uld Emhamed; Mohamed Salek Uld Buceif

Strength
1,000; Unknown	100–800

Casualties and losses
20 killed 36 wounded (Mauritanian-Moroccan claim)	96 killed 103 captured (Mauritanian-Moroccan claim)
- 200 killed

The Battles of La Güera and Tichla took place between 10 and 22 December 1975, when the Mauritanian Army invaded the southern part of Western Sahara, which was the zone agreed to be annexed by Mauritania in the Madrid Accords. Mauritanian troops were confronted by Polisario Front guerrillas, forcing the Royal Moroccan Army to intervene on behalf of Mauritania. By the end of 1975, Mauritania controlled the southern half of the former Spanish colony of Río de Oro.

== Background ==
By 6 November 1975, the Spanish government had evacuated the Spanish civilian population from La Güera during a 48-hour operation, part of the broader "Operation Swallow". Nineteen corpses from the La Güera cemetery were exhumed and embarked on the Ciudad de Huesca boat. A few hours later, POLISARIO flags waved on the main buildings of La Güera, after dozens of Sahrawi guerrilla fighters captured it and set up their own administration, and the town became cut off from air, sea and land.

== Battles ==
On 20 December 1975, the Mauritanian advance began, which at that time had a small army of just 2,000 troops, for which material support was requested from Morocco as well as from France. The occupation of La Güera was carried out by troops that came from Nouadhibou, as well as Nouakchott. The Saharawi troops began to fire, and the Mauritanian troops fell back in disorder. Due to the severity of the situation, Colonel Mohamed Ould Bah Ould Abdelkader was appointed as the person in charge of taking over the town. The Saharawi troops, made up of a hundred soldiers, under the command of Buzeid Uld Hmayen, were in a critical and desperate situation since they were isolated by land, sea and air with no possibility of retreat.

The Sahrawi troops attempted to delay the Mauritanian advance as much as possible by holding out in the buildings of the Territorial Police Headquarters from where they repelled the continuous Mauritanian attempts to take the place since they were repelled by a rain of light weapons projectiles. The fighting lasted about ten days and the Saharawis fought hard until the few survivors finally surrendered, since it is estimated that some 80 of the hundred Saharawi soldiers died, including their commander, Ould Hmayen. The surviving soldiers received undignified treatment by the Mauritanian authorities. The victory was short-lived as the Saharawis defeated them in 1978.

Further east, Tichla fell to Mauritanian troops on 20 December, while the town of El Argoub near Villa Cisneros, was captured on 11 January 1976, after having been besieged for two weeks.

== Aftermath ==
The few surviving Sahrawi soldiers from El Argoub were first relocated to the border between the Sahara and Mauritania, being then supplied and evacuated with the assistance of the Algerian Army to Algeria.
