= North Korean occupation of South Korea =

Korean People's Army occupation of South Korea
- 1950
- Flag Emblem

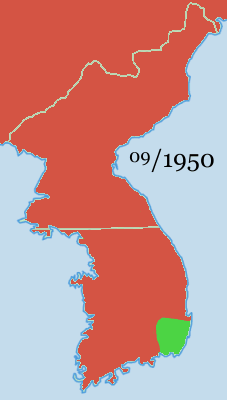
- Advancement by North Korea in 1950
- Status: Military occupation
- Capital and largest city: Seoul
- Supreme Commander of the KPA
  - June–July 1950: Choe Yong-gon
  - July–September 1950: Kim Il Sung
- Historical era: Korean War
  - Operation Pokpung: 25–30 June 1950
  - Capture of Seoul: 28 June 1950
  - Battle of Inchon: 10–19 September 1950
  - UN counteroffensive: 23–30 September 1950

The North Korean occupation of South Korea from June to September 1950 constituted the first phase of the Korean War.

On 25 June 1950, the Korean People's Army (KPA) crossed the 38th parallel between North and South Korea. The KPA advanced at an incredible speed, capturing Seoul on 28 June 1950. Thus began the three-months of North Korean occupation in South Korea. This occupation ceased after the UN launched a counteroffensive in September 30 following the landing on Inchon. This period of occupation is commonly described as "(Korea) under people's republican rule" (Korean: 인공 치하; Hanja: 人共治下; RR: Ingong-chiha).

== North Korean system in the South ==
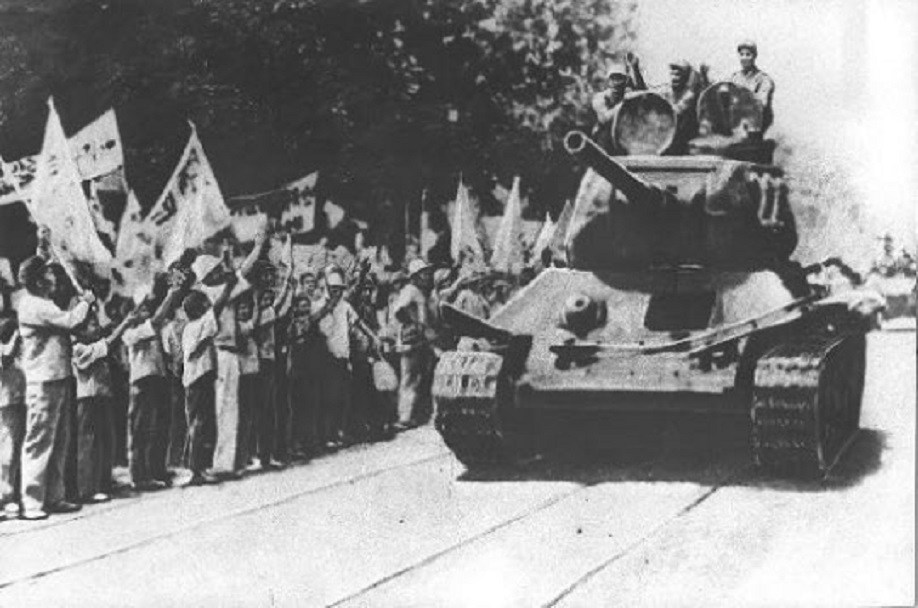
Tank unit of the Korean People's Army enters the streets of Seoul while being welcomed by the Korean people, 1950

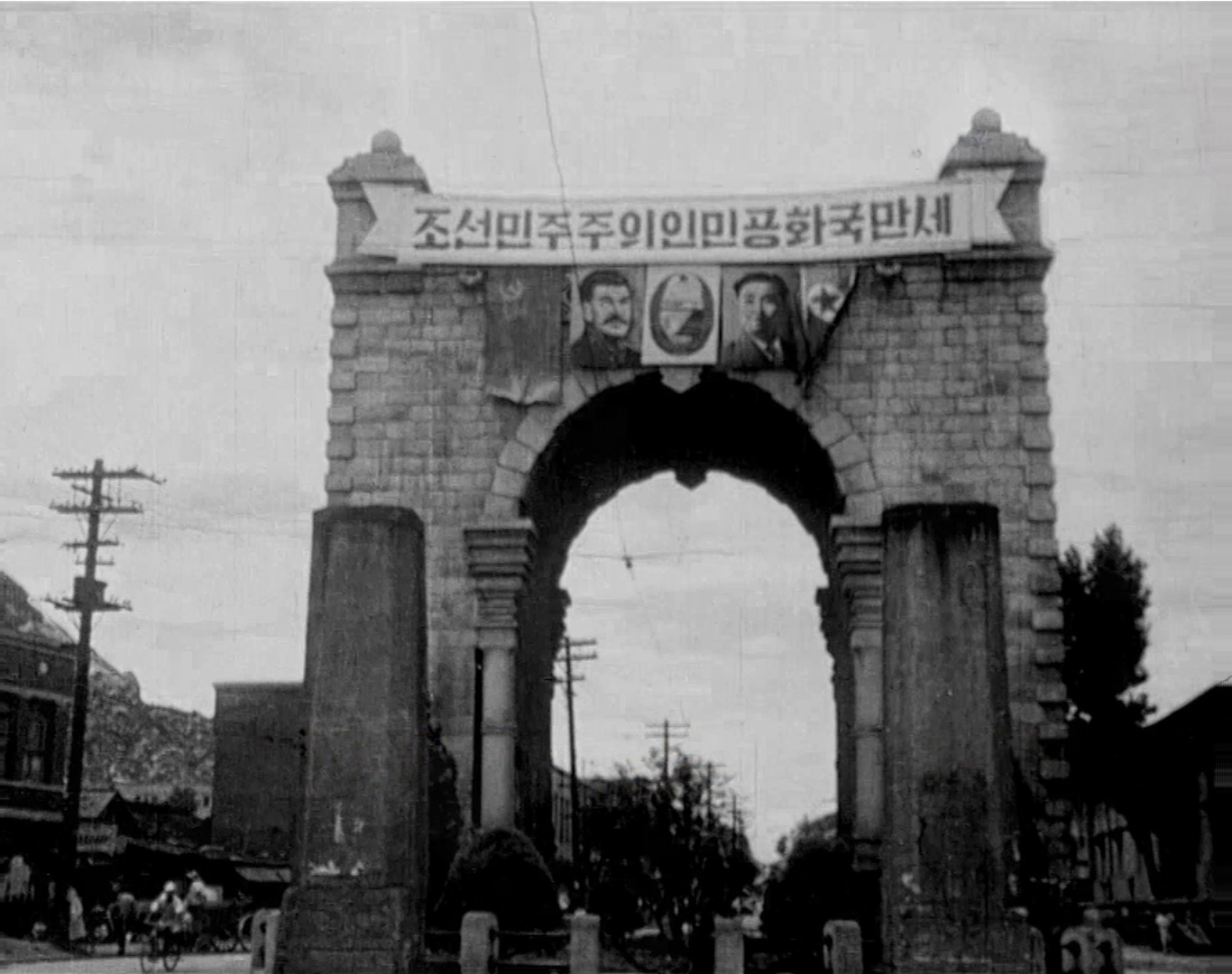
Independence Gate decorated with the emblem of North Korea, the portraits of Joseph Stalin and Kim Il Sung, and the flags of Soviet Union and North Korea. The motto reads "Long Live the Democratic People's Republic of Korea". 1950

The attempt at a North Korean "revolution" in the South is similar to the one in the North from 1945 to 1950. It was organized and disciplined for the most part. Although the process did include violence against those considered to be traitors or enemies of the people, the "three-month KPA occupation of Seoul and a large part of South Korea was far from a reign of terror". This was reflected in the ways the North Koreans implemented land reform, formed the women's and youth organizations, re-established the people's committees, and structured indoctrination efforts through propaganda.

=== Getting rid of the "enemies of the people" ===
Once the North Koreans entered Seoul, they initiated mass killings of actual or suspected anti-communists, and the more important political figures were taken to jail. Those specifically targeted were "former Japanese collaborators, high ranking members of the Rhee regime, the National Police, and members of right-wing youth groups". Executions were, at times, conducted by hastily organized "people's courts"; otherwise, those considered resistors to the North Korean regime were shot on sight. Around 3,000 citizens died due to such organized round-ups. Apart from these executions, the KPA and their associates were "careful, at least in the initial occupation, to avoid arbitrary and brutal dispensation of justice."

=== People's committees ===
The North Koreans re-established people's committees. Upon the end of the Second World War and Korea's liberation from Japan, Koreans had formed local governing bodies, called "people's committees," to maintain order in many different localities. When the Americans entered the South on September 8, 1945, they immediately sought to disband the people's committees. The restoration of the people's committees was declared in Kim Il Sung's first radio address after the Korean War broke out. The North Korean occupation's revival of people's committees was seen to symbolize independence from the Americans.

In Seoul, the Seoul's People's committee, led mostly by southerners, was organized swiftly. The committee sought to confiscate all Japanese property, and that of the ROK (Republic of Korea) government, Seoul's government officials, and "monopoly capitalists." Although many political figures were either killed or put in jail, some avoided this fate by joining Seoul's people's committee, such as O Man-sop, Cho So-ang, and Kim Kyu-sik. Yi Sung-yop, a southerner, was given the position of chairman of the Seoul People's Committee by the KPA (Korean People's Army).

=== Land reform ===
The North Korean system of land reform began in early July. These land reform measures might have further spurred the implementation of land reform in South Korea after the Korean War.

Land was taken away from prominent landlords and redistributed to tenants and landless farmers. Families received land based on the number of labor points each family obtained, and the "newly redistributed land would be taxed at the rate of about 25 percent of the annual harvest." Southern landowners were able to keep more land than northern landowners – they were allowed 20 chongbo (Korean: 정보; Hanja: 町步, about 50 acres); in the North, nothing over 5 chongbo was permitted.

The people's committees were given the authority to execute the land redistribution, under the oversight of North Korean party cadres. The redistribution of land was eventually carried out in every province outside the Pusan perimeter.

North Koreans claimed that "by the end of August 1950, land reform was accomplished in the provinces of Gyeonggi, North and South Chungcheong, North Jeolla, and in most of South Jeolla." It is also estimated that, by the time the North Korean Army left South Korea, 573,000 jeongbo, or 95%, of the land targeted for redistribution (that was projected in the government land bill) had been fully redistributed.

=== Women and youths ===
Women and youths played a large role politically and socially during the occupation. Southern supporters of the North's occupation were mostly from the working class, university and high school students, and females. Equal rights were promised to women, and this was one of the few policies that made a positive impression on the southerners. Many women became involved in the Women's Alliance, which was organized in every district.

There was also a focus on the young, as they were seen to be more malleable towards supporting communism. The youth were forced to attend political meetings, whereas the aged were not required to. Also, school was used as an important source for propagandistic efforts towards the youth, and the young Communists (the Youth Alliance) were meticulously and extensively organized through the schools. For example, the Youth Alliance members were assigned to various sections. There was an education section, cultural section, registration section, and accounting section, with the focus on organization and indoctrination. Like the Women's Alliance, the Youth Alliance had district, country, and city headquarters. According to historian Charles Armstrong, a US Air Force survey found that approximately "two-thirds of the students actively supported the KPA."

=== Propaganda ===
Propaganda was spread through the use of printed documents and reeducation meetings. Some of the main goals were to "promote aggression toward the United States," turn the South Koreans against their government, and show citizens the benefits of living under the North Korean system.

Radios were confiscated because of concern that people would listen to international news about the war, and were then replaced with domestic radios "sealed to the Pyongyang wavelength." These radios were used to repeat newspaper content, and the music played was all Party songs, odes to Stalin, or classical music composed by Soviet composers. However, some people often hid short wave radios in their ceilings or floors to listen to the UN broadcasts, even with the knowledge that they might be killed or jailed for doing so.

Printing of existing newspapers was halted and the papers were replaced by new offerings from the Party. The articles were written by Party dignitaries and officials, and thus the content tended to be official statements, letters, and speeches . Although the content might have been repetitive and boring, the North Koreans made sure that the press was accessible to the masses, because they viewed this medium to be effective in agitation.

Posters, books, mass rallies, pamphlets, theatrical performances, and even comic books were all used for propaganda. Many prominent southern writers such as No Chon-myong, a female poet, joined the communist Writer's League and performed actively in propagandistic activities, such as writing poems or books for the Northern government.

Parades and festivals seemed to have been North Korea's favorite use of propaganda. Even on September 15, 1950, the day of the Incheon Landing, the northerners planned a festival, scheduled to be in Seoul, and ironically celebrated "communist victory and the reuniting of the country." Notable composers and performers were to participate in this event but ended up fleeing.

Community meetings or organizational meetings were also used for indoctrination and reeducation of the South Korean populace. These included reading meetings, in which the people collectively read the newspaper or a Communist text, and self-criticism meetings, which consisted of public confessions of actions or practices against the Communist regime, followed by the audience voting whether or not to accept his or her confession. Also, people were encouraged to accuse others around them who held antagonistic sentiments toward the occupying regime, or those who didn't follow the established laws.

== Aftermath ==
After the Incheon Landing on September 15, the somewhat organized and disciplined form of administration fell apart. "Widespread killing and destruction of property took place" as the KPA retreated against the advancing forces. The Communists removed about 20,000 of their prisoners of war on a "death march" northward and killed many other South Korean political and military prisoners. However, after the re-occupation of Seoul by the UN and South Korean forces, many of those who had joined Committees or supported the Northern regime would again be purged, this time by the South Koreans.
