= Czesław Dźwigaj =

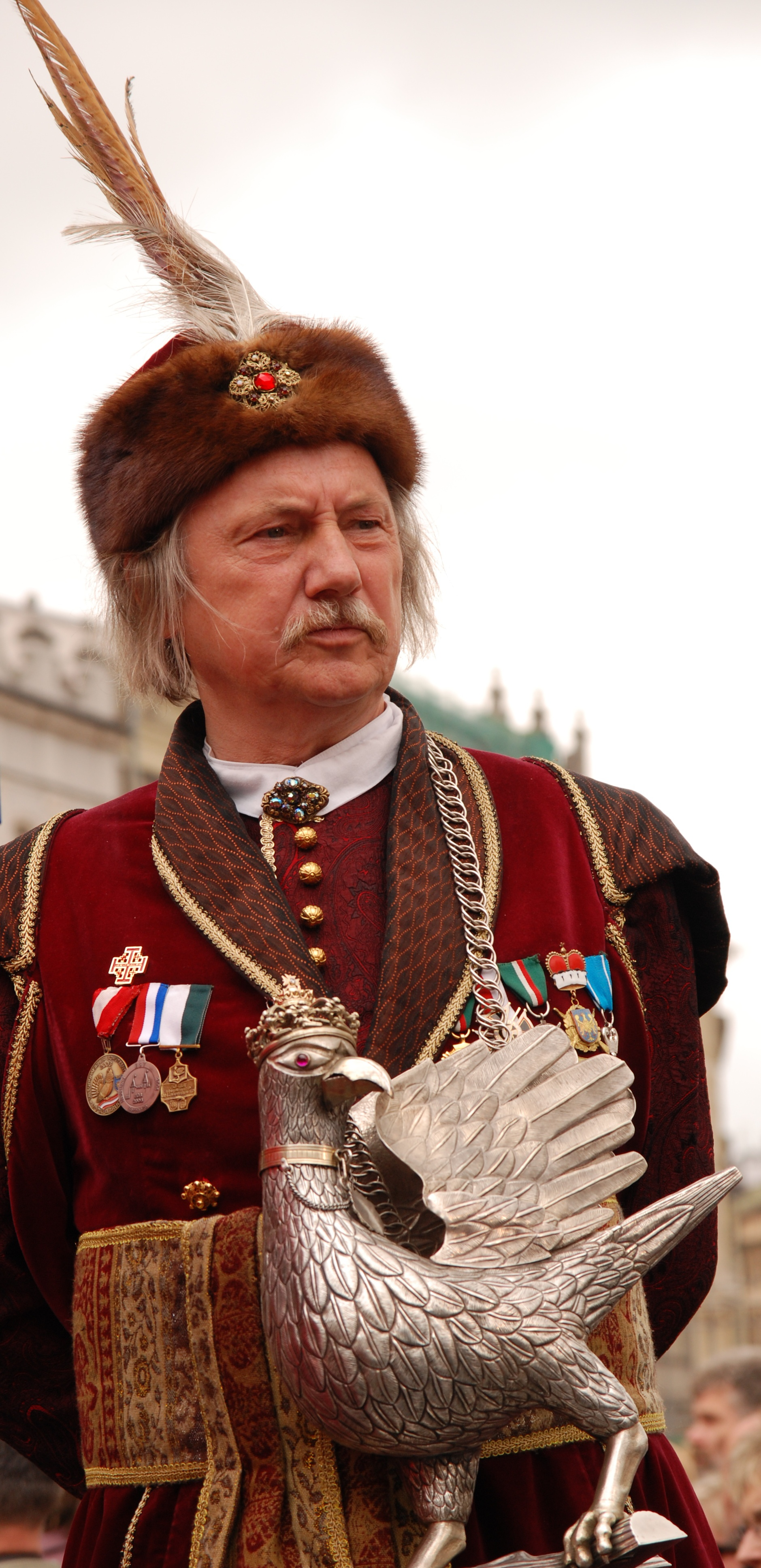
Czesław Dźwigaj during festivities of Kraków's Hunter's Guild in 2008

Czesław Dźwigaj (born 18 June 1950 in Nowy Wiśnicz) is a Polish artist, sculptor, and professor. Creator of numerous monuments, he is most often associated with monuments of Pope John Paul II, almost 50 of which have left his workshop.

== Artistic career ==
A student of Antoni Hajdecki, Dźwigaj completed his studies at the Academy of Fine Arts in Kraków in the years 1972-1977, where he now directs the studio of Ceramic Sculpture in addition to lecturing on sacred art at the Pontifical Academy of Theology in Kraków.

He began his artistic career working with the Roman Catholic Church. In the 1980s he completed a series of bronze casts for the cathedral in Tarnów, Poland. This work established his reputation, and he became known and popular as an artist of sacred art in other areas of Poland.

He has also designed numerous church interiors along with monumental bas-relief doors. Professor Dźwigaj is also the laureate of many prestigious awards from exhibitions and art competitions such as the Gold medal at the Biennale in Ravenna.

== Notable works ==
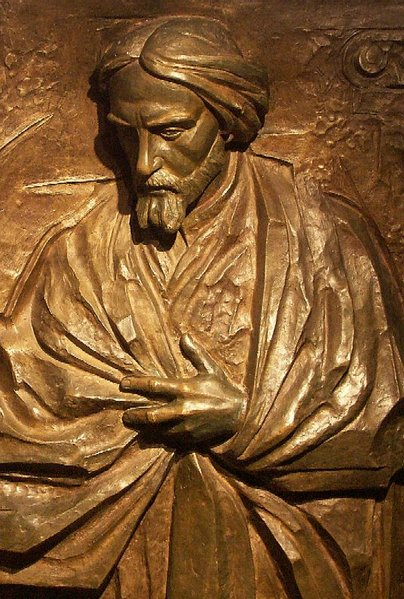
Detail of the Memorial to Cyprian Kamil Norwid by Czesław Dźwigaj in the Crypt of Bards in Wawel Cathedral, Kraków

- The Monument to the Victims of December 1970 in Szczecin. Unveiled on 28 August 2005 on plac Solidarności on the 25th anniversary of the founding of Solidarity, this 11-metre-tall and nearly 9-and-a-half-ton bronze monument commemorates the tragic events of December 1970, when, following workers’ demonstrations on the streets of Szczecin, 16 people were killed. The monument is of an angel standing on a ship which is breaking through the concrete slabs of the ground to rise above the earth. Commemorative plaques bear the names of the victims.
- A landmark sculpture of Christ the King in front of St. Mary of Częstochowa in Cicero, a Neogothic church built in the so-called 'Polish Cathedral' style along with the monumental bronze doors at St. Hyacinth's Basilica in Chicago, as well as monuments of Pope John Paul II in both Wyandotte, Michigan and Chicago.
- The Tolerance Monument unveiled in Jerusalem in 2008, in collaboration with sculptor Michal Kubiak. It is situated on a hill marking the divide between Jewish Armon HaNetziv and Arab Jabel Mukaber, standing opposite the United Nations headquarters in Jerusalem in a park near Goldman Promenade.
- A monumental bas-relief of the Tree of Jesse incorporated into the Church of the Nativity brought by Pope Benedict XVI during his trip to the Holy Land offered as a gift to the people of Bethlehem. Measuring in at 3 and a quarter meters wide and 4 meters in height, its corpus represents an olive tree figuring as the Tree of Jesse displaying Christ's lineage from Abraham through Saint Joseph along with other biblical motifs. Situated along the passage used by pilgrims making their way to the Grotto of the Nativity, the bas relief also incorporates symbolism from the Old Testament. The upper portion is dominated by a crowned figure of Christ the King in an open-armed pose blessing the Earth.

=== Sites outside Poland with monuments to Pope John Paul II by Professor Dźwigaj (partial list) ===
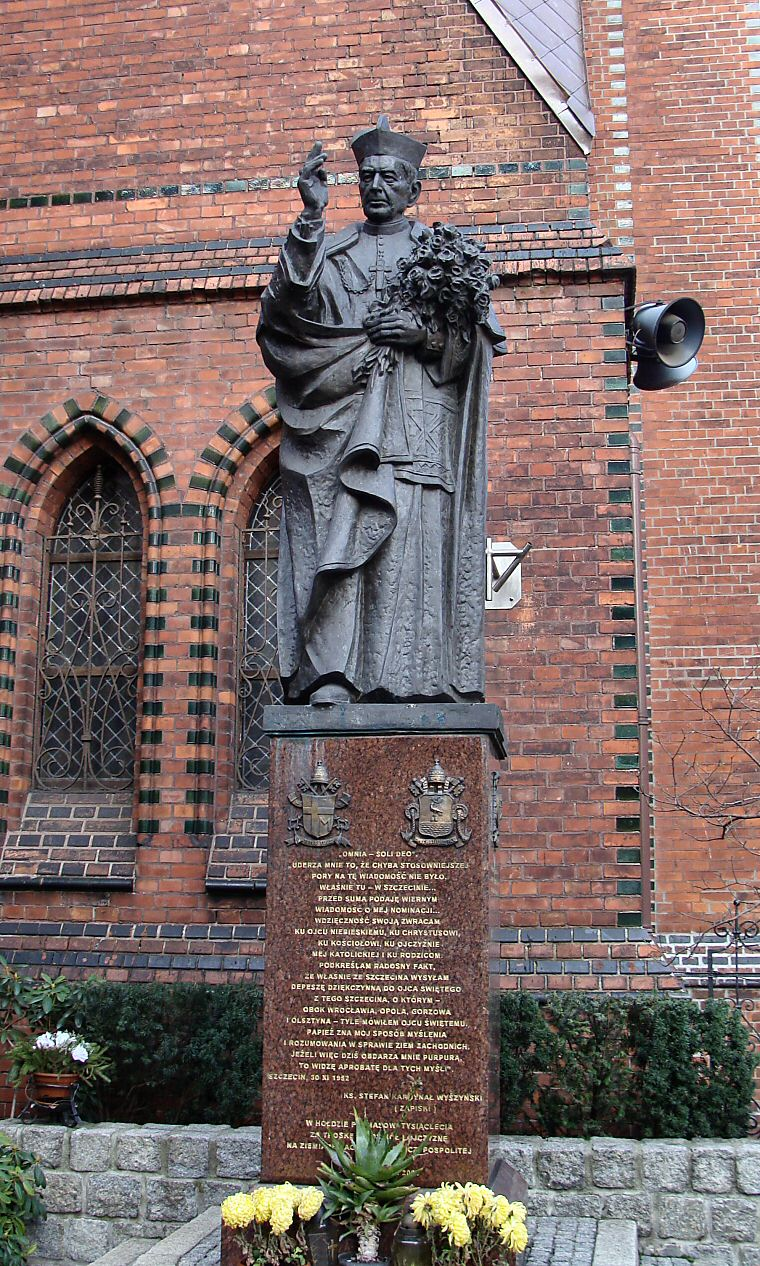
Monument of Stefan Cardinal Wyszyński, in Szczecin, Poland.

- Chicago (2)
- Wyandotte, Michigan
- Rome, Italy
- Hanover, Germany
- Šiluva, Lithuania
- Fátima, Portugal
- Posadas, Argentina
- San Cristóbal de La Laguna, España

== See also ==
- Polish Cathedral style
- Roman Catholicism in Poland
- Tolerance Monument
