= Çullu =

Çullu or Chullu or Chulalu may refer to:

- Çullu, Jabrayil, Azerbaijan
- Chullu, Charuymaq, East Azerbaijan Province, Iran
- Chulalu, Sarab, East Azerbaijan Province, Iran
- Chullu, now Collo, a Roman titular episcopal see
- Çullu, Quzanlı, a village in the Agdam District of Azerbaijan in the Quzanlı municipality
- Çullu Vtoroye, Agdam, a village in the Agdam District of Azerbaijan
- Çullu, Köprüköy
