= Leyla-Tepe culture =

Prehistoric culture of the Caucasus

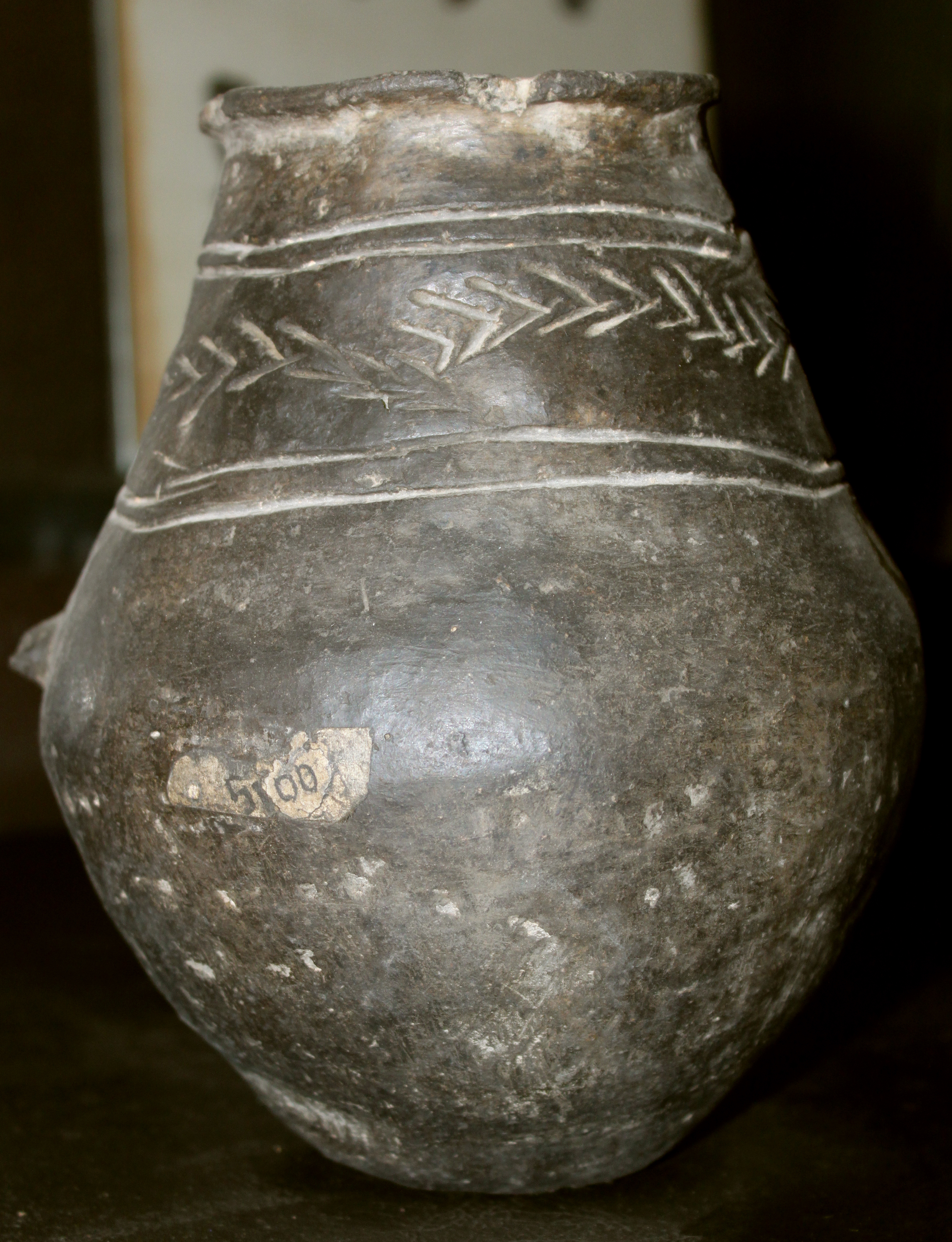
- Ceramic vessel from the site of Leyla-Tepe, near Quzanlı, Aghdam District of modern day Azerbaijan
- Geographical range: South Caucasus
- Period: Chalcolithic
- Dates: circa 4350 BCE — circa 4000 BCE
- Major sites: Leyla-Tepe
- Preceded by: Shulaveri–Shomu culture
- Followed by: Kura–Araxes culture

The Leyla-Tepe culture (Azerbaijani: Leylatəpə mədəniyyəti) of the South Caucasus belongs to the Chalcolithic era. It got its name from the site in the Agdam District of modern-day Azerbaijan. Its settlements were distributed on the southern slopes of Central Caucasus, from 3800 until 3200 B.C.

Monuments of the Leyla-Tepe were first located in the 1980s by I. G. Narimanov, a Soviet archaeologist. In the 2000s attention to the monuments was inspired by the risk of their damage due to the construction of the Baku–Tbilisi–Ceyhan pipeline and the South Caucasus pipeline.

== Leyla-Tepe site ==
The settlement of Leyla-Tepe is on the Karabakh plain at the northwestern outskirts of the small village of Eyvazlı, Agdam, close to the town of Quzanlı in the Aghdam District of Azerbaijan. It was discovered in 1984 by I. Narimanov. It is at an altitude of 100 m above sea level. The semi-dry bed of the Khachinchay River is located 8–10 km to the north. The settlement was originally found as a round hill, 50–60 m in diameter and 2 m in height. Its surface was damaged by modern agriculture, but fragments of ancient ceramics were found on the surface. The thickness of the cultural deposits on the site is about 2 m. Research was carried out at the site, but it was suspended because of the military operations in this region.

The monument is a single period site without visible cultural changes. Four construction horizons had been identified, of which the upper one was almost completely destroyed by plowing; the lower level was not yet excavated. Few ash pits or refuse accumulations have been found.

All buildings examined at the Leilatepe settlement are rectangular in plan. They were erected without a foundation, on the levelled ground surface. The walls were made of rectangular mud bricks laid evenly in horizontal rows with the use of mortar.

In the same area of the Aghdam District in the Karabakh valley, there are also some other sites belonging to Leyla-Tepe culture. They are Chinar-Tepe, Shomulu-Tepe (near Mirəşelli village), and Abdal-Aziz-Tepe. Aghdam District had been disputed in recent Nagorno-Karabakh wars.

== Characteristics and influences ==
The Leyla-Tepe culture is also attested at Böyük Kəsik in the lower layers of this settlement. The inhabitants apparently buried their dead in ceramic vessels. Similar amphora burials in the South Caucasus are found in the Western Georgian Jar-burial culture, that is mostly of a much later date. Jar burials are attested in many parts of the world as early as 4500 BC.

The ancient Poylu II settlement was discovered in the Aghstafa District of modern-day Azerbaijan during the construction of the Baku–Tbilisi–Ceyhan pipeline. The lowermost layer dates to the early fourth millennium BC, attesting a multilayer settlement of Leyla-Tepe culture.

Among the sites associated with this culture, the Soyugbulag kurgans or barrows are of special importance. The excavation of these kurgans, located in Kaspi Municipality, in central Georgia, demonstrated an unexpectedly early date of such structures on the territory of Azerbaijan. They were dated to the beginning of the 4th millennium BC.

The culture has also been linked to the north Ubaid period monuments, in particular, with the settlements in the Eastern Anatolia region (Arslantepe, Coruchu-tepe, Tepechik, etc.).

The settlement is of a typical Western-Asian variety, with the dwellings packed closely together and made of mud bricks with smoke outlets.

It has been suggested that the Leyla-Tepe were the founders of the Maykop culture. According to Catherine Marro (2022), Maykop/Majkop culture "is certainly connected with the Leyla Tepe complex".

An expedition to Syria by the Russian Academy of Sciences revealed the similarity of the Maykop and Leyla-Tepe artifacts with those found in 1988–2000 while excavating the ancient city of Tel Khazneh I, dating from the 4th millennium BC.

Leyla-Tepe pottery is very similar to the 'Chaff-Faced Ware' of the northern Syria and Mesopotamia. It is especially well attested at Amuq F phase. Similar pottery is also found at Kultepe, Azerbaijan.

=== Galayeri ===
In 2012, the important site of Galayeri, belonging to the Leyla-Tepe archaeological culture, was investigated by Najaf Museibli. It is located in the Qabala District of modern-day Azerbaijan. The location is in the area of the Qabala International Airport, about 20 km south from the city of Qabala (Gabala).

Structures consisting of clay layers are typical; no mud-brick walls have been detected at Galayeri. Almost all findings have Eastern Anatolian Chalcolithic characteristics. The closest analogues of the Galayeri clay constructions are found at Arslantepe/Melid VII in Temple C. The site was further investigated in 2018.

The archaeological material of the Galayeri settlement is very similar to the finds at the settlements of Böyük Kəsik I, and Poylu II, as well as the Leyla Tepe site. Especially the ceramics are similar at all these sites.

Small metal tools finds indicate the production of metal here 6 thousand years ago. Also the remains of a very early potter's wheel have been found.

Radiocarbon dating indicates that Galayeri settlement goes back to the beginning of the 4th millennium BC, which is also supported by the archaeological artifacts found at the settlement.

== Metalwork ==
The development of Leyla-Tepe culture in the Caucasus marked the early appearance of extractive copper metallurgy. According to research published in 2017, this development that occurred in the second half of the 5th millennium BC preceded the appearance of metallurgy in Mesopotamia.

In recent past, the development of copper metallurgy in the Caucasus was attributed to migrants from Uruk arriving around 4500 BCE, or perhaps rather to the pre-Uruk traditions, such as the late Ubaid period, and Ubaid-Uruk phases.

Leyla-Tepe metalwork tradition was seen as very sophisticated right from the beginning, and it featured many bronze items. Later, the quality of metallurgy declined somewhat with the advent of the Kura–Araxes culture. Only during the latter stages of Kura–Araxes culture was there an improvement in quality again.

== See also ==
- Kura–Araxes culture
- Yarim Tepe, Iraq

== Sources ==
- Р. М. Мунчаев, Н. Я. Мерперт, Ш. Н. Амиров ТЕЛЛЬ-ХАЗНА I. Культово-административный центр IV–III тыс. до н. э. в Северо-восточной Сирии. Издательство «Палеограф». Москва 2004. ISBN 5-89526-012-8
- Najaf Museyibly, Archeological Excavations Along the Route of the Baku–Tbilisi–Ceyhan Crude Oil Pipeline and the South Caucasus Gas Pipeline, 2002–2005
- Veli Bakhshaliyev 2021, Archaeological investigations at Nakhchivan Tepe. in Catherine Marro and Thomas Stöllner, eds. Marro, Catherine; Stöllner, Thomas, eds. (2021). On salt, copper and gold: The origins of early mining and metallurgy in the Caucasus. MOM Éditions. doi:10.4000/books.momeditions.12257. ISBN 978-2-35668-074-7.
