= Tariyel Gasimov =

Azerbaijani theatre and film actor

Tariyel Gasimov Tariyel Qasımov
- Born: February 4, 1939 (age 87); Agstafa, Azerbaijan SSR, USSR
- Occupation: actor
- Awards

Tariyel Isgandar oghlu Gasimov (Azerbaijani: Tariyel İsgəndər oğlu Qasımov; born February 4, 1939) is an Azerbaijani theatre and film actor, People's Artiste of Azerbaijan (1991).

== Biography ==
Tariyel Gasimov was born on February 4, 1939, in the village of Kechasker, Agstafa. In 1956, he was admitted to the Azerbaijan State Institute of Physical Education. While he was studying, he started going to Lutfi Mammadbeyov's drama club. As a second-year student, he acted in a play at the Azerbaijan State Theatre of Young Spectators. In 1960, with a letter from the theater management, he transferred his documents to the Theatre Institute and was admitted to the Faculty of Cinema and Drama Acting. He was accepted to the Azerbaijan State National Drama Theatre while in his third year. In 1964, he graduated from the Faculty of Drama and Film Acting of the Azerbaijan State Theatre Institute.

Since October 1, 1964, he has been an actor of the Azerbaijan State Theatre of Young Spectators with certain intervals. After working at the Theatre of Young Spectators for 2 years, he was invited to Nakhchivan State Musical Dramatic Theatre. In 1967, he was one of the first actors of the newly reopened Yerevan State Azerbaijan Dramatic Theatre.

In 1968, he returned to Baku and worked as a director's assistant in a film studio. In 1972, he returned to the Theatre of Young Spectators. Since 1997, he has been an artistic director and director of the Gazakh State Drama Theatre. In addition to "Azerbaijanfilm", he has shot films at "Turkmenfilm", "Tajikfilm", "Uzbekfilm", "Mosfilm", "DEFA" studios.

== Awards ==
- People's Artiste of Azerbaijan — May 22, 1991
- Honored Artist of the Azerbaijan SSR — February 9, 1979
- Labor Order (3rd degree) — December 2018
