= Ismikhan Yusubov =

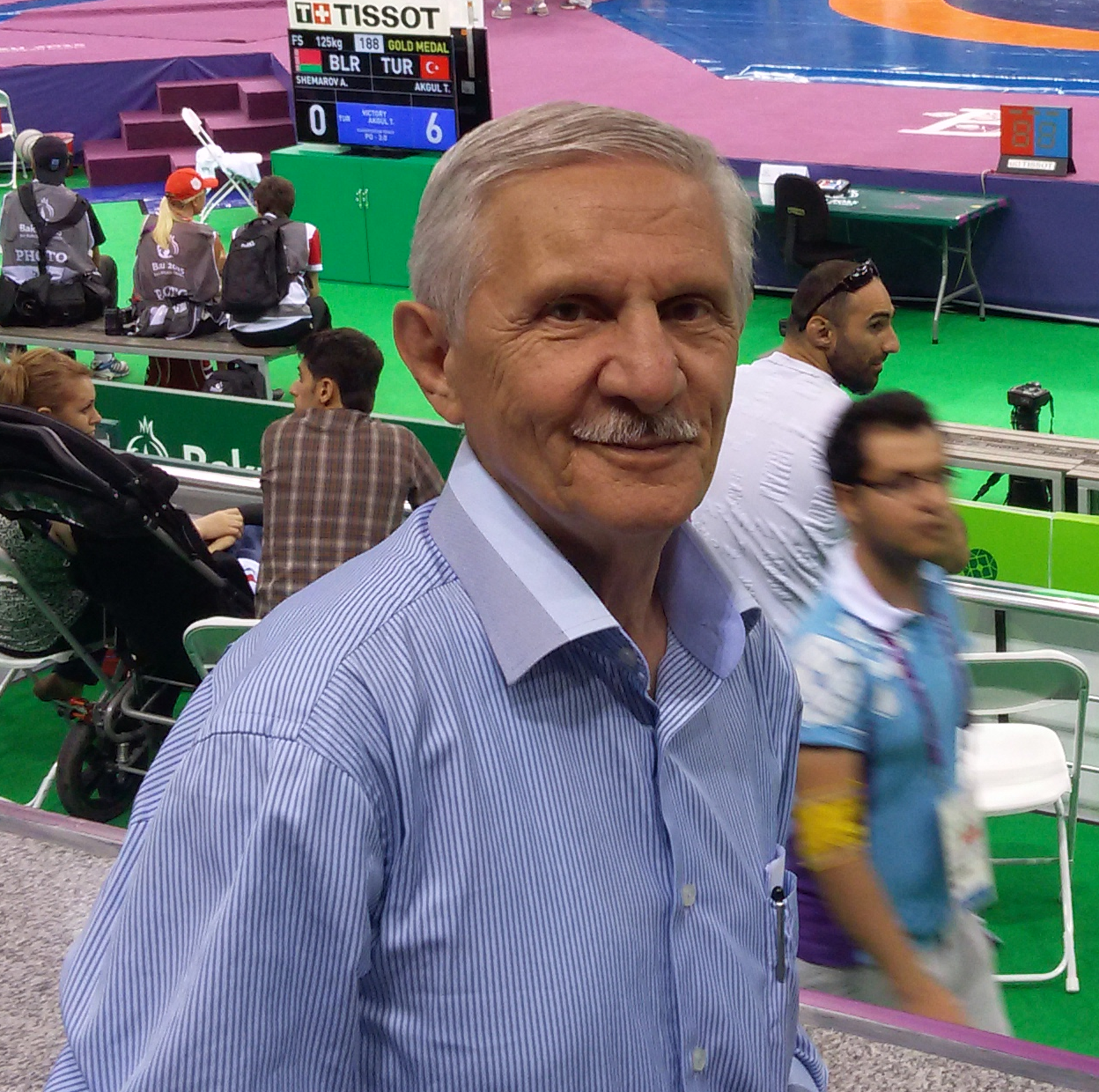
- Born: September 11, 1945 (age 81); Aghstafa District, Azerbaijan SSR, Soviet Union
- Citizenship: Azerbaijan
- Education: Candidate of physics-mathematics
- Alma mater: Azerbaijan State University
- Scientific career
- Fields: Mathematics, Physics

Ismikhan Mahammad oghlu Yusubov is an Azerbaijani mathematician and writer-publicist.

== Life ==
He was born in 1945 in the village of Poylu, Aghstafa region, Azerbaijan. In 1962, he was admitted to the Faculty of Mechanics and Mathematics of Azerbaijan State University. After completing a three-year military service in Moscow from 1964 to 1967, he graduated from the university in 1970 and worked for one year as a mathematics and physics teacher in Jalilabad.

At Azerbaijan State University (later Baku State University) he began his academic career as a doctoral student in 1971. He then served as an assistant instructor in 1974, assistant professor in 1981, and associate professor in 1989. He defended his Candidate of Sciences dissertation in 1983 at the same institution.

From 1993 to 2012, he worked at universities in Turkey, including Kojaeli and Sakarya Universities. From 2012 to 2014, he returned to Baku State University, where he worked at the Department of Algebra and Geometry of the Faculty of Mechanics and Mathematics.

== Works ==
Ismikhan Yusubov is the author of more than 100 scientific articles, teaching aids and books.

== Publicistic and Literary Activity ==
Ismikhan Mahammad oghlu Yusobov is also known for his publicist and literary work. In addition to his academic research in mathematics, he is the author of several books and essays on social, national and historical themes, including works addressing Azerbaijani cultural life. His writings have been published in various periodicals, and he has served on the editorial board of the journal Khazar Review (Xəzər Xəbər).

== Books ==
- "Письмо другу" (rusca), Bakı, Azərnəşr, 1990, 52 səh.
- "Dosta məktub", Bakı, Azərnəşr, 1990, 49 səh.
- "Kompleks dəyişənli funksiyalar nəzəriyyəsindən məsələ həllinə dair rəhbərlik və çalışmalar" (M.Q.Pənahovla birlikdə), Bakı, "Bakı Universiteti", 2000, 218 səh.
- "Письмо другу. Постскриптум" (rusca), Bakı, "Kür", 2002, 88 səh.
- "Ehtimal nəzəriyyəsinin elementləri (məsələ həllinə rəhbərlik və çalışmalar)" (M.Q.Pənahovla birlikdə), Bakı, "Kür", 2003, 207 səh.
- "Lineer cebir ve sonlu boyutlu lineer operatörler teorisinin elemanları" (türkcə) (M.Q.Pənahovla birlikdə), "Sakarya Kitabevi", 2004, 279 səh. ISBN 975-8644-37-8 (2-ci nəşri 2006-cı, 3-cü nəşri 2009-cu ildə buraxılıb)
- "Şerim - həyatım mənim", Bakı, "MBM", 2005, 320 səh. ISBN 9952-29-058-6
- "Xətti cəbrin əsasları (Ali məktəblər üçün dərslik)" (M.Q.Pənahov və C.M.Mustafayevlə birlikdə), Bakı, "MBM", 2005, 256 səh.
- "Riyazi fizikanın bəzi klassik məsələlərinin həll üsulları" (M.Q.Pənahovla birlikdə), Bakı, "MBM", 2006, 76 səh.
- "Matematik güzeldir. Anlamanın sevincii ve kederi" (türkcə), "Bilim ve Gelecek Kitablığı", 2008, 266 səh. ISBN 978-605-5888-04-6
- "Числовая область" (rusca), Bakı, "MBM", 2011, 216 səh. ISBN 978-9952-29-045-5
- "Sayısal görüntü" (türkcə), Bakı, "MBM", 2011, 224 səh. ISBN 978-9952-29-023-3
- "Erməni dosyası", Bakı, "MBM", 2011, 160 səh. ISBN 978-9952-29-049-3
- "Atam və biz, siz, onlar", Bakı, "MBM", 2012, 124 səh.
- "Mənim Poylu kəndim", Bakı, "MBM", 2012, 432 səh. ISBN 978-9952-29-002-8
- "Mənim Atlantidam", Bakı, "MBM", 2015, 104 səh. ISBN 978-9952-29-094-8
- "Riyaziyyat haqqında dialoqlar", Alfred Renyi (Ruscada tərcümə edən, müqəddimə, son söz və "Elm və metafizika haqqında monoloqlar" əlavəsinin müəllifi: İsmixan Yusuf), Bakı, "Ecoprint", 2016, 108 səh. ISBN 978-9952-29-101-8
- "Cəlilabadnamə" (gündəlikdən sətirlərdə), Bakı, "Ecoprint", 2016, 72 səh.
- "Anlatmanın əzabı, sevinci və kədəri" (Düşünmək gözəldir), Bakı, "Ecoprint", 2017, 326 səh. ISBN 978-9952-29-109-4
- "Моя армейская Одиссея и латышские друзья" (1964-1967), Баку, "Есоprint", 2019, 60 стр.
- "Возвращение Одиссея или путь длиною в 55 лет" (2019-1964), Баку, "Есоprint", 2019, 104 стр.
- "Реинкарнация прерванной дружбы через 50 лет (посредством писем с отрицательной энергией)", (совместно с Агрисом Редовичем), Баку, "Füyuzat", 2022, 244 стр. ISBN 978-9952-37-865-8
- Ömrümə nur çiləyənlər, Bakı, Füyuzat, 2025, 336 s. ISBN 978-9952-584-69-1
- Жизнь после реинкарнации, Баку, «Фюзат» (“Füyuzat”), 2025, 120 стр.
