= Poylu =

Poylu or Poyli may refer to:

- Poylu, Agstafa, Azerbaijan
- Poylu, Samukh, Azerbaijan
- Poylu, Poylu, Azerbaijan
