= Vidadi Babanli =

Azerbaijani writer (1927–2025)

- Born: 5 January 1927 Qazax, Azerbaijan SSR, Transcaucasian SFSR, USSR
- Died: 16 August 2025 (aged 98)
- Occupation: Writer

Vidadi Yusif oglu Babanli (Azerbaijani: Babanlı Yusif oğlu Vidadi, 5 January 1927 – 16 August 2025) was an Azerbaijani writer, dramatist, translator and Merited Artist of Azerbaijan.

== Life and career ==
Babanli was born in Şıxlı village of Qazax Rayon which is now renamed to Muğanlı and is under administration of Agstafa Rayon. His father Yusif Babanli was a history teacher and school headmaster. After he completed school in the village, he went to Azerbaijan State University in Baku in 1944 and completed his degree in 1949. He then worked at a local school in Sabirabad but soon returned to Baku to work at Azərbaycan müəllimi (Azerbaijani Teacher) magazine. Even though he entered doctoral studies department and went to study at Maxim Gorky Literature Institute in Moscow, he had to return to Azerbaijan soon due to his health problems. In Baku he worked at Ədəbiyyat Qəzeti (Literature Newspaper) as literature expert and then became its branch manager from 1954 – 1960. From 1961 – 1968, he worked as the branch manager at Azerbaycan magazine. From 1974 – 1976, he was the editor-in-chief of Azerbaijanfilm's dubbing department. From 1978 – 1981, he was the vice-editor of Yazıçı publishing house. Vidadi Babanli's first poem was "Anam sən oldun" (You turned out to be my mother) published in 1947. Some of his first poems were published under his pseudonym Vidadi Şıxlı. In 1949, the poem "Donuş" (Turn) was published at İngilab və Medeniyyet (Revolution and Culture) magazine. In 1951, the poem "Təbrizdə bir gecə" (One night in Tabriz) was published in "Literary miscellany". In 1954, he continued his career with longer novels such as "Gəlin" (Bride).

Babanli was the author of more than 40 books and one film script. His novels and poems have been translated into a number of languages. The novel "Vicdan susanda" (When the conscience is silent) was first published in 1970, then in 1976 and completely in 1978. It was published in Azerbaijan for 9 times and in Russia for 5 times. The boom was translation into Persian and Turkish languages and published in Iran, Tehran in 2010, in Turkey, Istanbul in 2011. His drama plays are "Ana intiqami" (Mother's revenge), which was written in 1994 and put on the stage of Drama Theatre in 1996; "Çuruk adam" (A Stinker) (2002); "İtirilmiş inam" (Lost confidence) (2006). Later, the novel "Müqəddəs ocaq" (Holy hearth) (1982) was published in Azeri and Russian languages; the other novels are "Omurluk azab" (Eternal torment) (2005), "Gizlinlerim" (Secrets) (2007), "Geribe eşq" (Strange love) (2009), "Bulanliq dunya" (Turbid world). Vidadi Babanli is also the author of 5 narratives: "Gəlin" (Bride) (1955), "Ayazlı gecələr" (Frosty nights) (1958), "Həyat bizi sınayır" (Life is testing us) (1963), "İnsaf nənə" (Grandmother İnsaf) (1988), "Ana intiqamı" (Mother's revenge) (1994). The stories and poems are also the result of many years' work. He wrote collections of poems under the title "Hoydu, dəlilərim, hoydu" (Go ahead, my heroes) and "Kişilik himni" (The anthem of courage). An outstanding representative of contemporary Azeri literature, Vidadi Babanli has tried his pen in translating and writing hundreds of journalistic articles about various literary problems. As a talented translator Vidadi Babanli has translated the works of well-known Russian, Ukrainian writers, such as Valentin Rasputin and others. Being an editor-in-chief of dubbing department Vidadi Babanli has translated the texts of the films about Abu Reyhan Biruni, "Red arrowwood". The screen movie "Həyat Bizi Sınayır" (Life is testing us) scripted by Vidadi Babanli was shot in 1972. In 2009, the Writer's Union of Azerbaijan celebrated Vidadi Babanli's 80th anniversary. Latterly, 85-year-old Vidadi Babanli wrote poems.

== Death ==
Babanli died on 16 August 2025, at the age of 98.
