= Şəkərli =

Şəkərli or Shakarly may refer to:

- Şəkərli, Agstafa, Azerbaijan
- Şəkərli, Salyan, Azerbaijan
