= Umileyla Mammadova =

Azerbaijani cotton grower (1916–2007)

- Umileyla Alı qızı Məmmədova
- Born: 1916; Köçəsgər, Elizavetpol Governorate, Russian Empire
- Died: 24 February 2007 (aged 90–91)
- Burial place: Köçəsgər
- Occupations: Cotton grower, collective farmer
- Awards: Hero of Socialist Labour (1948); Order of Lenin (1948); Order of the Red Banner of Labour

Umileyla Ali gizi Mammadova (Azerbaijani: Umileyla Alı qızı Məmmədova; 1916 – 24 February 2007) was a Soviet Azerbaijani cotton grower and collective farmer who was awarded the title of Heroine of Socialist Labour and the Order of Lenin in 1948 in recognition for harvesting large amounts of cotton.

== Early life ==
Umileyla Ali gizi Mammadova was born in 1916 in the village of Köçəsgər in the Kazakh district of the Elizavetpol Governorate, Russian Empire (now the Aghstafa District of Azerbaijan).

== Career ==
In 1931, Mammadova starting working on the Nizami collective farm in the Kazakh district. While on the frontline during World War II, her husband went missing, leaving her as the sole provider to their children, two daughters and a son. After the war ended, she became in charge of growing cotton on the collective farm. In 1947, Mammadova harvested 92.48 centners of cotton per hectare on an area of 3.06 hectares. As a reward for her cotton yield in addition to her high wheat yields, Mammadova was awarded the title Heroine of Socialist Labour and the Order of Lenin award by decree of the Presidium of the Supreme Soviet of the Soviet Union on 10 March 1948. The farm's chairman was also awarded by the same decree. The collective farm continued to achieve high cotton harvests in the subsequent years under Mammadova's management, resulting in her receiving the Order of the Red Banner of Labour in recognition of this.

In 1951, she was working on a Bagirov farm in the Aghstafa District. Mammadova became a member of the Communist Party of the Soviet Union in 1954.

== Later life and death ==
Mammadova retired in 1964 and she began receiving a personal pension of union significance from the Soviet government. She continued living in the Köçəsgər village.

Umileyla Mammadova died on 24 February 2007. She was buried at the Köçəsgər village cemetery.
