= Ibrahim Rahimov =

- İbrahim Rəhimov
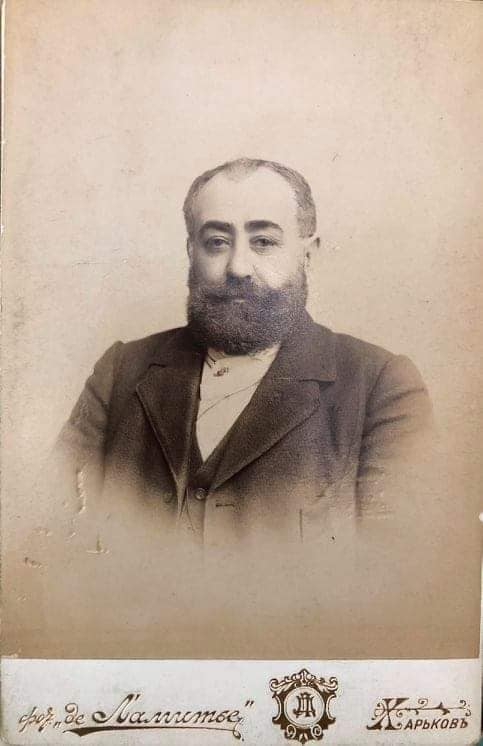
- Born: August 17, 1850
- Died: April 3, 1927 (aged 76)
- Citizenship: Russian Empire
- Education: Tbilisi Classical Gymnasium, Moscow University, University of Vienna
- Alma mater: Psychiatry
- Children: Sona Valikhan
- Father: Molla Rahim

Rahimov Ibrahim Molla Rahim oglu (August 5 (17), 1850, Dağ Kəsəmən, Yelizavetpol Uyezd, Tbilisi Governorate, Russian Empire – April 3, 1927, Dağ Kəsəmən, Gazakh, Azerbaijan SSR, USSR) was the first Azerbaijani to earn a medical degree, Azerbaijan's first psychiatrist, and the head of the "Acute Mental Illness" department at the former "Saburov Garden" Psychiatric Hospital.

== Life ==
Ibrahim Rahimov was born in 1849 in the village of Dağ Kəsəmən, in what is now the Agstafa district. His father, Rahim Suleyman oglu, was a state peasant from the village of Dağ Kəsəmən in the Yelizavetpol uyezd. He studied Eastern languages and Islamic law, serving as an imam. In 1850, Molla Rahim began teaching at the Tbilisi Classical Gymnasium, moved his family to Tbilisi, and personally took charge of his son’s education. He first taught Ibrahim the "Qur'an" and his native language, and in 1858, enrolled him in the preparatory course of the gymnasium where he worked.

Under the strict discipline of the gymnasium, Ibrahim Rahimov excelled; by the first grade, he had mastered Russian perfectly. He performed well in his studies and his name was listed among the top students of the gymnasium.

== Education ==
=== Years at Moscow University ===
In 1867, Rahimov’s appeal to the principal of the Tbilisi Governorate Gymnasium was well-received. Considering his academic achievements, enthusiasm for secular sciences, and exceptional intellectual abilities, the Pedagogical Council of the Tbilisi Classical Gymnasium granted him a recommendation to study at Moscow University during its meeting on June 19, 1867. Having graduated from the gymnasium with top marks, Rahimov moved to Moscow the same year and successfully passed the entrance exams. However, for an unknown reason, he was admitted to the Faculty of Physics and Mathematics instead of the Faculty of Medicine. With determination, he managed to transfer to the medical faculty, fulfilling his dream of becoming a doctor.

At Moscow University, he was taught by distinguished scholars such as zoologist and public figure A.P. Bogdanov, histophysiologist and founder of Moscow's histology school A.I. Babukhin, renowned therapist G.A. Zakharin, and famous neurologist A.J. Kojevnikov (who also taught the renowned Polish neurologist E. Flatau). During his studies, he achieved excellent grades in all subjects except botany and physics. To support himself financially, he also gave private Russian language lessons to Moscow gymnasium students during this period.

Nechayevism and Imprisonment

While in Moscow, Rahimov witnessed the rise of communism-anarchism currents and their various factions in Tsarist Russia. One of these organizations was a small group that had gathered around Sergey Gennadyevich Nechayev. His ideology was based on the principles of catechism and had managed to gather a certain group of people around him.

Student I. Rahimov was accepted into this illegal organization called "Народная расправа" (People's Justice) led by S.G. Nechayev. Subsequently, due to his participation in the famous "Полунинская история" (Poluninskaya Story) movement that began in October 1869, many students, including I. Rahimov, were expelled from the university. He was sent to Petersburg with other prisoners and imprisoned in the Peter and Paul Fortress. Rahimov remained in various cells of the fortress from May 11, 1870, until October 1, 1871. During his free time after interrogations, he learned German, which later proved to be very helpful. As a young man who had not yet reached adulthood, I. Rahimov was sentenced to three weeks of detention in the Lithuanian fortress in Petersburg. He was arrested in 1869, expelled from the university, and forced to live under police surveillance for five years.

After his release from prison, I. Rahimov decided to settle in Kharkiv to continue his university education. Unable to find work in Kharkiv, he was forced to work as a paramedic on the declining Kharkiv-Sevastopol railway line. He lived for a while in the Melitopol area of the railway. Realizing once again that he could not continue his higher education in Russia, I. Rahimov went to Vienna in 1875 and was admitted to the Faculty of Medicine at the University of Vienna. Due to the high cost of living in Vienna and his lack of financial support, he was compelled to move to the small university town of Jena (Germany) to continue his education. After completing his medical education, I. Rahimov returned to Kharkiv. His political mood was characterized by an incident at the Russia-Austria border, where the Tsar's border guards found K. Marx's "Capital" in the young doctor's suitcase. The book was immediately confiscated. The police surveillance over Rahimov was restored after his return from abroad and lasted until the February Revolution of 1917. He was not allowed to live in the Caucasus, and he settled in Kharkiv. Each time he wanted to return to his homeland, he had to obtain permission from the gendarmerie. In 1881, to obtain the right to work as a doctor, he took exams for medical ranks at Kharkiv University. I. Rahimov was eager to engage in scientific research in the field of physiology, taking his first steps in this area at the forensic medicine department of the Faculty of Medicine.

== Career ==
I.R. Rahimov successfully passed the exam to obtain a medical doctor degree, but he could not submit his dissertation. His scientific career was interrupted by police intervention; he was expelled from the university in 1888 "at his own request" as a doctoral student deemed politically unqualified (and non-Russian). In 1891, I.R. Rahimov began working as an ordinator at a local hospital known as "Saburov garden" in Kharkiv province. He served as the head of the acute mental illness department for 34 years and temporarily replaced the chief physician at times.

On July 17, 1916, the 25-year medical and public service of Ibrahim Rahimov was celebrated at Saburov Garden. Numerous congratulations came from prominent scientists, friends, and colleagues. According to his colleagues, I.R. Rahimov possessed an exceptionally broad scientific intellect and significant medical experience. He trained several generations of young psychiatric specialists.

After over 40 years of diligent service at the Zemskaya Hospital in Kharkiv province, I.R. Rahimov retired due to health issues. In 1925, the doctors of the hospital petitioned the Kharkiv provincial executive committee to award him a personal pension as an honored veteran of labor and to confer upon him the title of honorary consultant of the hospital. In 1925, while I.R. Rahimov was seriously ill, he came to visit his daughter Sona, and two years later, he was taken to his native village, Dağkəsəmən. On April 3, 1927, I.R. Rahimov closed his eyes forever, bidding farewell to his homeland of Azerbaijan, which he had longed for all his life.
