= Qarayazı =

Qarayazı or Karayazy may refer to:

- Qarayazı, Agstafa, Azerbaijan
- Qarayazı, Goychay, Azerbaijan
