= Həzi Aslanov =

- Hazi Aslanov
- Həzi Aslanov, Azerbaijan
- Hazi Aslanov (Baku Metro)
