= Soyuqbulaq, Agstafa =

Soyuqbulaq
- Location within Azerbaijan
- Coordinates: 41°19′22″N 45°15′54″E
- Country: Azerbaijan
- Rayon: Agstafa
- Municipality: Köçvəlili
- Time zone: UTC+4 (AZT)
  - Summer (DST): UTC+5 (AZT)

Soyuqbulaq (also, Soyuq Bulaq) is a village in the Agstafa Rayon of Azerbaijan. It forms part of the municipality of Köçvəlili.

In 2006, a French–Azerbaijani team discovered nine kurgans at the cemetery of Soyuqbulaq. They were dated to the beginning of the fourth millennium BC, which makes it the oldest kurgan cemetery in Transcaucasia. Similar kurgans have been found at Kavtiskhevi, Kaspi Municipality, in central Georgia.

Several other archaeological sites seem to belong to the same ancient cultural tradition as Soyuq Bulaq. They include Berikldeebi, Kavtiskhevi, Leilatepe, Boyuk Kesik, and Poylu, Agstafa, and are characterized by pottery assemblages "mainly or totally in the North Mesopotamian tradition".

== Discoveries ==
The numerous artifacts discovered at these sites have shed light on the material and spiritual culture of this ancient people during the late Eneolithic period. Amongst the finds are stone and bone tools, metal objects, and a huge cache of clay vessels. There are also anthropomorphic and zoomorphic figurines made of clay or bone. Grain residues were also excavated.

The residents kept cattle and other domesticated animals in these settlements.

Most of these sites are associated with the Leilatepe archeological culture of the first half of the fourth millennium BCE. It is believed that this was the result of the migration of near-eastern tribes from Mesopotamia to South Caucasus, especially to Azerbaijan.

According to the excavators,

Discovery of Soyugbulaq in 2004 and subsequent excavations provided substantial proof that the practice of kurgan burial was well established in the South Caucasus during the late Eneolithic. The roots of the Leylatepe Archaeological Culture to which the Soyugbulaq kurgans belong to, stemmed from the Ubaid culture of Central Asia.

The Leylatepe Culture tribes migrated to the north in the mid-fourth millennium, B.C. and played an important part in the rise of the Maikop Culture of the North Caucasus. A number of Maikop Culture kurgans and Soyugbulaq kurgans display the same northwest to southeast grave alignment. More than that, Soyugbulaq kurgans yielded pottery forms identical to those recovered from the Maikop kurgans. These are the major factors attesting to the existence of a genetic link between the two cultures.

== Metallurgy ==
The earliest mining of metals started in this area already in the second half of the 4th millennium. After 3000 BC, a significant increase in the use of metal objects occurred in this area of Caucasus, and at the Kura-Araxes sites in general.

Also the variation in copper alloys increased during this time. The rich tomb of a woman at Kvazchela is a good example of this, which is quite similar to the 'royal tomb' from Arslantepe. The use of an arsenical component up to 25% in copper objects resulted in a shiny greyish, silvery colour. So it is quite possible that these unusually high arsenical alloys were intended to imitate silver.

Also, the earliest evidence of silver use in Caucasus is attested at Soyuq Bulaq at this time, although these items are still rather few. Silver also occurred for the first time in the archaeological record of Georgia during this period.

== See also ==
- Archaeology of Azerbaijan
- Galayeri
