= Galayeri =

Galayeri is an important archaeological site of the Chalcolithic era located in the Qabala District of Azerbaijan. It belongs to the Leyla-Tepe culture.

The site was first investigated in 2012 by archaeologist N. Museibli. The monument takes about 3 hectares, and it is located on a plain at 342 m above sea level. The hill rises to a height of 3 m above the plain.

The location is in the area of the Qabala International Airport, about 20 km south from the city of Qabala (Gabala).

== Related sites ==
The archaeological material of the Galayeri settlement is very similar to the finds at the settlements of Beyuk Kesik I, and Poylu II, both located in the Aghstafa District of Azerbaijan. Especially the ceramics is similar at these sites. All these settlements are located fairly close to each other along the valley of the Kura river. Soyuqbulaq, Agstafa, another important ancient site with many kurgans is also in this area.

Galayeri is also closely connected to early civilizations of Near East.

Structures consisting of clay layers are typical; no mud-brick walls have been detected at Galayeri. Almost all findings have Eastern Anatolian Chalcolithic characteristics. The closest analogues of the Galayeri clay constructions are found at Arslantepe/Melid VII in Temple C.

In 2018, during the excavations led by the deputy director of ANAS Institute of Archeology and Ethnography Najaf Museibli, it was established that the thickness of the cultural layer belonging to Leylatepe culture at the site is more than 3 m, indicating a long occupation.

Small metal tools finds indicate the production of metal here 6,000 years ago. Also the remains of a very early potter's wheel have been found.

Radiocarbon dating indicates that Galayeri settlement goes back to the beginning of the 4th millennium BC, which is also supported by the archaeological artifacts found at the settlement.

Several other archaeological sites were also discovered in the area recently.

Ceramic items of early Kura–Araxes culture have been discovered at Galayeri dating back to the early 4th millennium BC (Chalcolithic period). One of these findings is a clay wheel model.

== See also ==
- History of Azerbaijan

== Bibliography ==
- Najaf Museibli 2014, THE GRAVE MONUMENTS AND BURIAL CUSTOMS OF THE LEILATEPE CULTURE. Baku, 2014. 158 pages
