= Eyvazlı =

Eyvazlı or Evazlı or Eyvazly may refer to:

- Eyvazlı, Agdam, Azerbaijan
- Eyvazlı, Qubadli, Azerbaijan
