= Eynallı =

- Municipality
- Location within Azerbaijan
- Coordinates: 41°04′08″N 45°29′51″E
- Country: Azerbaijan
- Rayon: Agstafa

Population
  - Total: 2,284
- Time zone: UTC+4 (AZT)
  - Summer (DST): UTC+5 (AZT)

Eynallı (also, Eynally) is a village and municipality in the Agstafa Rayon of Azerbaijan. It has a population of 2,284.
