= Museyib Allahverdiyev =

Azerbaijani Red Army major (1909–1979)

Musayib Abdulla oglu Allahverdiyev
- Müseyib Abdulla oğlu Allahverdiyev
- Born: 5 May 1909; Dağ Kəsəmən, Kazakhsky Uyezd, Yelizavetpol Governorate, Russian Empire
- Died: 19 May 1969 (aged 60)
- Military career
- Allegiance: Soviet Union
- Branch: Red Army
- Service years: 1931–1946
- Rank: Major
- Unit: 40th Guards Rifle Division
- Conflicts: World War II; Battle of Moscow; Budapest Offensive
- Awards: Hero of the Soviet Union; Order of Lenin; Order of the Red Star

Museyib Abdulla oglu Allahverdiyev (Azerbaijani: Müseyib Abdulla oğlu Allahverdiyev; 5 May 1909 – 19 May 1979) was an Azerbaijani Red Army major and a Hero of the Soviet Union. Allahverdiyev was awarded the title for his leadership of his battalion during the Budapest Offensive. During the offensive, the battalion was reported to have destroyed 25 German tanks, killed up to 1200 soldiers, and captured 2200. Allahverdiyev left the army after the end of the war.

== Early life and Interwar ==
Allhaverdiyev was born on 5 May 1909 in Dağ Kəsəmən to a peasant family. He received lower secondary education and worked on the kolkhoz. In 1931, he volunteered for the Red Army. He served in the Azerbaijan Rifle Division named for Sergo Ordzhonikidze. In 1932, he became a member of the Communist Party of the Soviet Union. In 1933, Allahverdiyev was sent to the Tbilisi Infantry School, from which he graduated in 1936. He then became a commissar in the army.

== World War II ==
Allahverdiyev fought in combat from July 1941. He fought in the Battle of Moscow while serving with the 1st Guards Cavalry Division and was awarded the Order of the Red Star for his actions on 23 November 1942. He then fought in the Battles of Kharkov, the capture of Dnipropetrovsk, Zaporizhia, Nikolayev, Krivoy Rog, Kirovograd, and Chișinău. He became a battalion commander in the 119th Guards Rifle Regiment of the 40th Guards Rifle Division. In fall 1944 and early 1945, Allahverdiyev fought in the Budapest Offensive.

On 13 November, the battalion broke through the German defenses. On the night of 1 December, the battalion crossed the Danube in boats under artillery fire and engaged German troops on the right bank of the river. When Allahverdiyev reached the shore, he reportedly covered the landing with machine gun fire. Changing his position, he reportedly opened fire on the German troops and disorganized the defenses. The German troops reportedly began to retreat. In this battle, Allahverdiyev's battalion reportedly killed 500 and captured 2200 German soldiers. The battalion reportedly captured 24 guns, 36 machine guns, 8 mortars, 3 cars, 10 carts, and 2 warehouses with ammunition and food storage. During the Siege of Budapest, Allahverdiyev's battalion was ordered to stop a column of 120 German tanks attempting to relieve the siege. Allahverdiyev reportedly organized an ambush, which destroyed 25 German tanks and killed up to 700 soldiers. On 24 March 1945 Allahverdiyev was awarded the title Hero of the Soviet Union and the Order of Lenin.

== Postwar ==
Allahverdiyev retired in 1946 with the rank of major. He died on 19 May 1969.

In the village of Dağ Kəsəmən a bust of Allahverdiyev was constructed.
