= Bəyazatlı =

Beyazatly
- Azerbaijani: Bəyazatlı
- Location within Azerbaijan
- Coordinates: 41°03′N 45°28′E
- Country: Azerbaijan
- District: Aghstafa
- Time zone: UTC+4 (AZT)
  - Summer (DST): UTC+5 (AZT)

Bəyazatlı (also, Beyazatly) is a village in the Aghstafa District of Azerbaijan.
