= Mansum Ibrahimov =

Azerbaijani mugham singer and actor (born 1960)

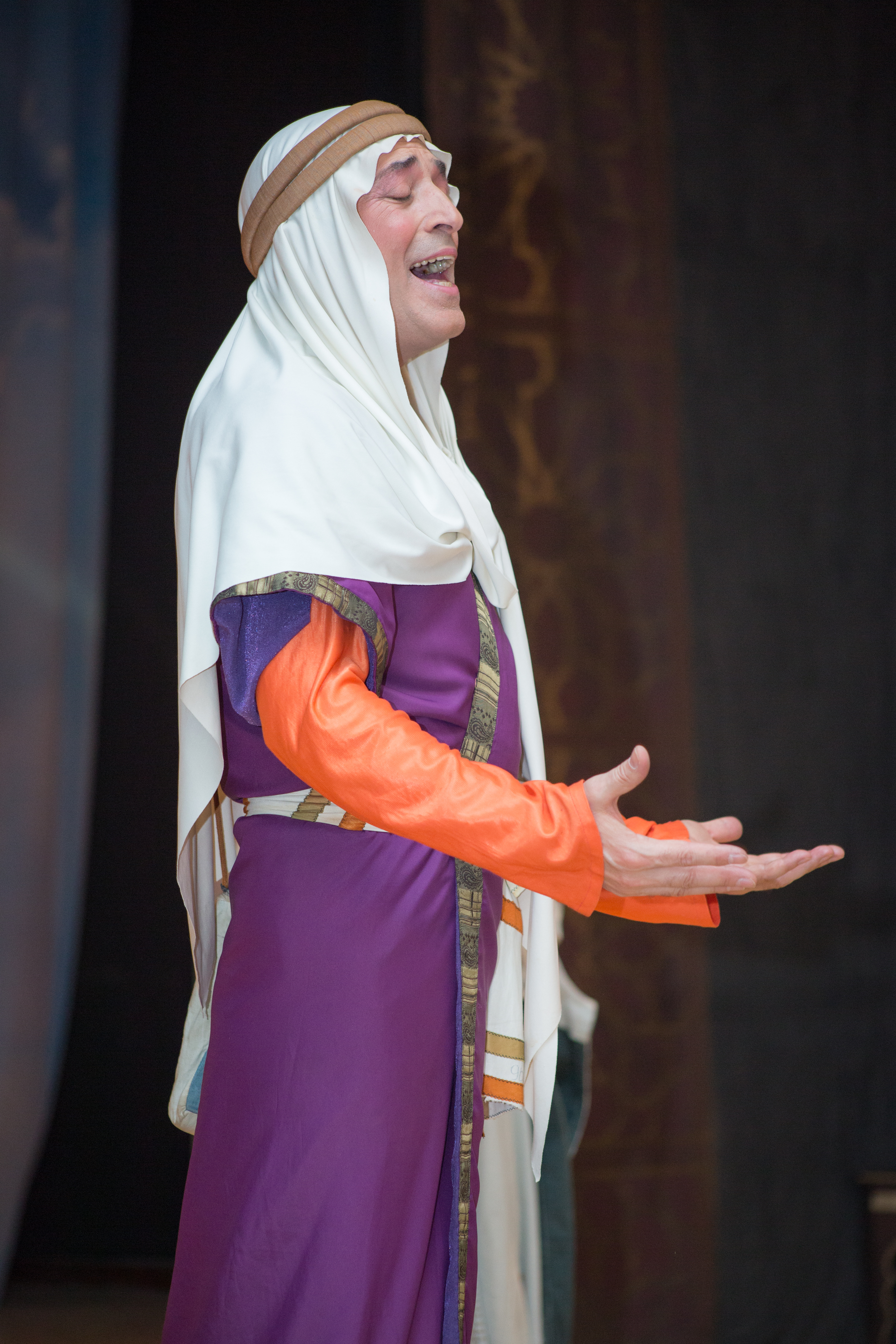
- As Majnun. Leyli and Majnun opera

Background information
- Born: Mansum Israfil oglu Ibrahimov; October 1, 1960; İmamqulubəyli, Agdam, Azerbaijani SSR, USSR
- Origin: Aghdam, Azerbaijan
- Genres: Mugham
- Occupation: Musician
- Instruments: Singing, daf
- Years active: 1987–present

Mansum Israfil oglu Ibrahimov (Azerbaijani: Mənsum İsrafil oğlu İbrahimov; born October 1, 1960, in İmamqulubəyli, Agdam, Azerbaijani SSR, USSR) is an Azerbaijani mugham singer and actor.

== Biography ==
In 2011, he participated with "Ensemble Garabagh" in WOMEX in Copenhagen, Denmark.

In 2013, Ibrahimov with Ensemble Garabagh visited Austria to give 3 sold-out concerts for survivors of 2012 East Azerbaijan earthquakes.
