= Zəlimxan =

- Municipality
- Location within Azerbaijan
- Coordinates: 41°10′11″N 45°28′56″E
- Country: Azerbaijan
- Rayon: Agstafa
- Elevation: 307 m (1,007 ft)

Population (2009)
  - Total: 1,269
- Time zone: UTC+4 (AZT)
  - Summer (DST): UTC+5 (AZT)

Zəlimxan (also known as Zelimkhan) is a village and municipality in the Agstafa Rayon of Azerbaijan.
