= Isa Mughanna =

Isa Mughanna İsa Muğanna
- Born: June 12, 1928; Mughanly, Aghstafa District, Azerbaijan SSR, USSR
- Died: April 1, 2014 (aged 85); Baku, Azerbaijan
- Resting place: Alley of Honor
- Education: Azerbaijan State University; Maxim Gorky Literature Institute
- Occupations: writer, screenwriter, editor-in-chief
- Writing career
- Notable awards

Isa Mustafa oghlu Huseynov (Azerbaijani: İsa Mustafa oğlu Hüseynov, June 12, 1928 – April 1, 2014) was an Azerbaijani writer, screenwriter and film editor, People's Writer of the Azerbaijan SSR (1988), Honored Art Worker of the Azerbaijan SSR (1976).

== Biography ==
Isa Mughanna was born on June 12, 1928, in the village of Mughanly, Aghstafa District. After graduating from high school, he entered Azerbaijan Medical University in 1945 but returned to his village after four months. Later, he enrolled in the Faculty of Philology at the Azerbaijan State University. In 1952, he graduated from the Maxim Gorky Literature Institute in Moscow.

He worked as the editor of the Literary Department in Azernashr (1952–1954), head of the prose department in the "Literaturnıy Azerbaydjan" newspaper (1960–1964), chief editor (1964–1968), editor (1968–1974), and member of the Script Council (1974–1979) at the "Azerbaijanfilm" film studio named after J. Jabbarly. He also served as the chief editor of the State Cinematography Committee of the Azerbaijan SSR (1979).

Isa Mughann began his literary career in 1948 and published his first work "Anadil okhuyan yerda" in the newspaper "Ingilab ve Madaniyyat" in 1949. His books were published starting in the 1950s, and films were adapted from his scripts. His works were translated into foreign languages. The film "26 Baku Commissars" received the best historical-revolutionary film award at the All-Union Leningrad Festival in 1968.

He died on April 1, 2014, in Baku.

== Awards ==
- Honored Art Worker of the Azerbaijan SSR – December 23, 1976
- Diploma and prize of the Writers' Union of Kyrgyzstan — 1976
- Order of the Badge of Honour — 1978
- People's Writer of the Azerbaijan SSR – June 23, 1988
- Istiglal Order — June 11, 1998
- "Nasimi" Award — 2012
