= Soyuqbulaqlar =

Village in Azerbaijan

Coordinates: 41°18′N 45°14′E

Soyuqbulaqlar (also, Soyuq Bulaqlar) is a village in the municipality of Köçvəlili in the Agstafa Rayon of Azerbaijan.
