= Nesimi (film) =

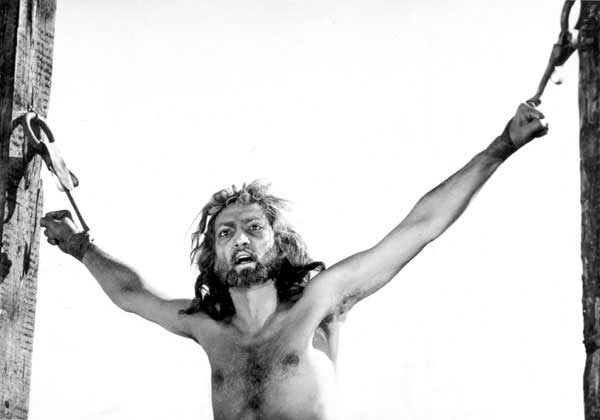
- Directed by: Hasan Seyidbeyli
- Written by: Isa Huseynov
- Produced by: Azerbaijanfilm
- Starring: Rasim Balayev; Ismayil Osmanli
- Edited by: Tamara Narinbeyova
- Music by: Tofig Guliyev
- Production company: Azerbaijanfilm
- Release date: 1973
- Running time: 96 min.
- Country: Soviet Union
- Language: Azerbaijani

Nesimi (Azerbaijani: Nəsimi) is a Soviet biopic film shot in Baku, Absheron, Gobustan, Nakhichevan, Shamakhi (Azerbaijan), Bukhara, Samarkand (Uzbekistan), Halab, Damascus (Syria) in 1973. Screenplay was written by Isa Huseynov. Directed by Hasan Seyidbeyli, this film is in history drama genre depicting the life of a prominent Azerbaijani philosopher and poet, Imadaddin Nasimi. The film is considered one of the best Azerbaijani movies in historical genre produced during Soviet times. After this debut in a big movie, the actor in the leading role, Rasim Balayev became a notable actor after this movie.

== Plot ==
The film is a biographical true story about the life of Imadaddin Nasimi, well known throughout the East for his school of philosophy and thought, poems and promotion of moral values in a feudal society. During the 14th-15th centuries, when Azerbaijan was a stage for warring powers and civil wars, Nasimi was the only poet committed to promotion of humanism and moral values inflicting criticism on the ruling system and the society itself. For his intruding role in feudal regimes, Nasimi lived a complex and tragic life. At the end of the film, Nasimi is killed in front of masses as his skin is peeled off while alive.

== Cast ==
- Rasim Balayev - Nesimi
- Ismayil Osmanli - Naimi
- Khalida Guliyeva - Fatma
- Kamal Khudaverdiyev - Yusif
- Almaz Asgarova - Shams
- Tofig Mirzoyev

== Production ==
The movie is based on Isa Muganna's historical novel Judgement Day. The reason for filming movie was to commemorate the 600th anniversary of Imadaddin Nasimi, poet of the 14th century. To be correct in historical facts, the film makers consulted philologists and art historians.

== Awards ==
In 1974, during 7th Soviet film festival in Baku, the film was awarded with Prime Award for Best Historical Film; Rasim Balayev in the leading role was awarded with Best Actor award.

== See also ==
- Azerbaijani films of the 1970s
