= Köçvəlili =

- Municipality
- Location within Azerbaijan
- Coordinates: 41°20′09″N 45°15′11″E
- Country: Azerbaijan
- Rayon: Agstafa

Population
  - Total: 2,792
- Time zone: UTC+4 (AZT)
  - Summer (DST): UTC+5 (AZT)

Köçvəlili (also, Kechvelli, Köçvəlli, and Kochvelili) is a village and municipality in the Agstafa Rayon of Azerbaijan. It has a population of 2,792. The municipality consists of the villages of Köçvəlili, Soyuqbulaq, Qarayazı, Həzi Aslanov, and Soyuqbulaqlar.
