= Xılxına =

- Municipality
- Location within Azerbaijan
- Coordinates: 41°10′29″N 45°24′57″E
- Country: Azerbaijan
- Rayon: Agstafa
- Elevation: 266 m (873 ft)

Population
  - Total: 1,306
- Time zone: UTC+4 (AZT)
  - Summer (DST): UTC+5 (AZT)

Xılxına (also, Khyikhyna and Khylkhyna) is a village and municipality in the Agstafa Rayon of Azerbaijan. It has a population of 1,306.
