= Şəkərli, Agstafa =

Şəkərli
- Location within Azerbaijan
- Coordinates: 41°09′35″N 45°27′15″E
- Country: Azerbaijan
- Rayon: Agstafa
- Municipality: Poylu
- Elevation: 305 m (1,001 ft)

Population (2009)
  - Total: 9
- Time zone: UTC+4 (AZT)
  - Summer (DST): UTC+5 (AZT)

Şəkərli (also, Shakarly) is a village in the Agstafa Rayon of Azerbaijan. The village forms part of the municipality of Poylu.
