= Lutfi Mammadbeyov =

Lutfi Mammadbeyov Lütfi Məmmədbəyov
- Born: February 6, 1927; Agdash, Azerbaijan SSR, TSFSR, USSR
- Died: February 1, 2004 (aged 76); Baku, Azerbaijan
- Occupations: actor, film director
- Awards

Lutfi Shahbaz oghlu Mammadbeyov (Azerbaijani: Lütfi Şahbaz oğlu Məmmədbəyov, February 6, 1927 – February 1, 2004) was an Azerbaijani actor and director, screenwriter, artistic director of films, People's Artiste of Azerbaijan (1991).

== Biography ==
Lutfi Mammadbeyov was born on February 6, 1927, in Agdash. He studied at the Theatre Technical College between 1943 and 1947. Between 1961 and 1966, he studied at and graduated from the Faculty of Directing at the Azerbaijan State Institute of Arts.

After completing his studies at the Theatre Technical College in 1947, Mammadbayov worked with the Azerbaijan State Theatre of Musical Comedy. However, at the end of the '40s, the theater temporarily closed. Because of this, the actor joined the troupe of the Azerbaijan State Theatre of Young Spectators.

In 1961, Mammadbeyov was invited to join the Azerbaijan State Academic National Drama Theatre, working there until the end of his life. Mammadbeyov was the director of more than 60 television shows, such as "Eye Doctor", "After the Rain", "Senli Sensiz" and "Yad Gizi". He acted in films such as "If Not That One, Then This One", "Bakhtiyar", "Leyli and Majnun" and "The Magic Gown".

Mammadbeyli was the first director to produce a television series in Azerbaijan. In 1993, the director created a 12-episode series based on the work of the writer Alibala Hajizade, "Itkin Gelin". Later, he shot the 6-episode "Dodagdan Gelbe" (1998) and 6-episode "After the Rain" (1998).

Lutfi Mammadbeyov died on February 1, 2004, in Baku.

== Awards ==
- People's Artiste of Azerbaijan — May 22, 1991
- Honored Artist of the Azerbaijan SSR — June 1, 1974
- Shohrat Order — March 13, 1997
