= Quzanlı =

Guzanly
- Municipality
- Azerbaijani: Quzanlı
- Location within Azerbaijan Location within Karabakh Economic Region
- Coordinates: 40°09′36″N 47°10′20″E
- Country: Azerbaijan
- District: Aghdam

Population
  - Total: 13,002
- Time zone: UTC+4 (AZT)
  - Summer (DST): UTC+5 (AZT)

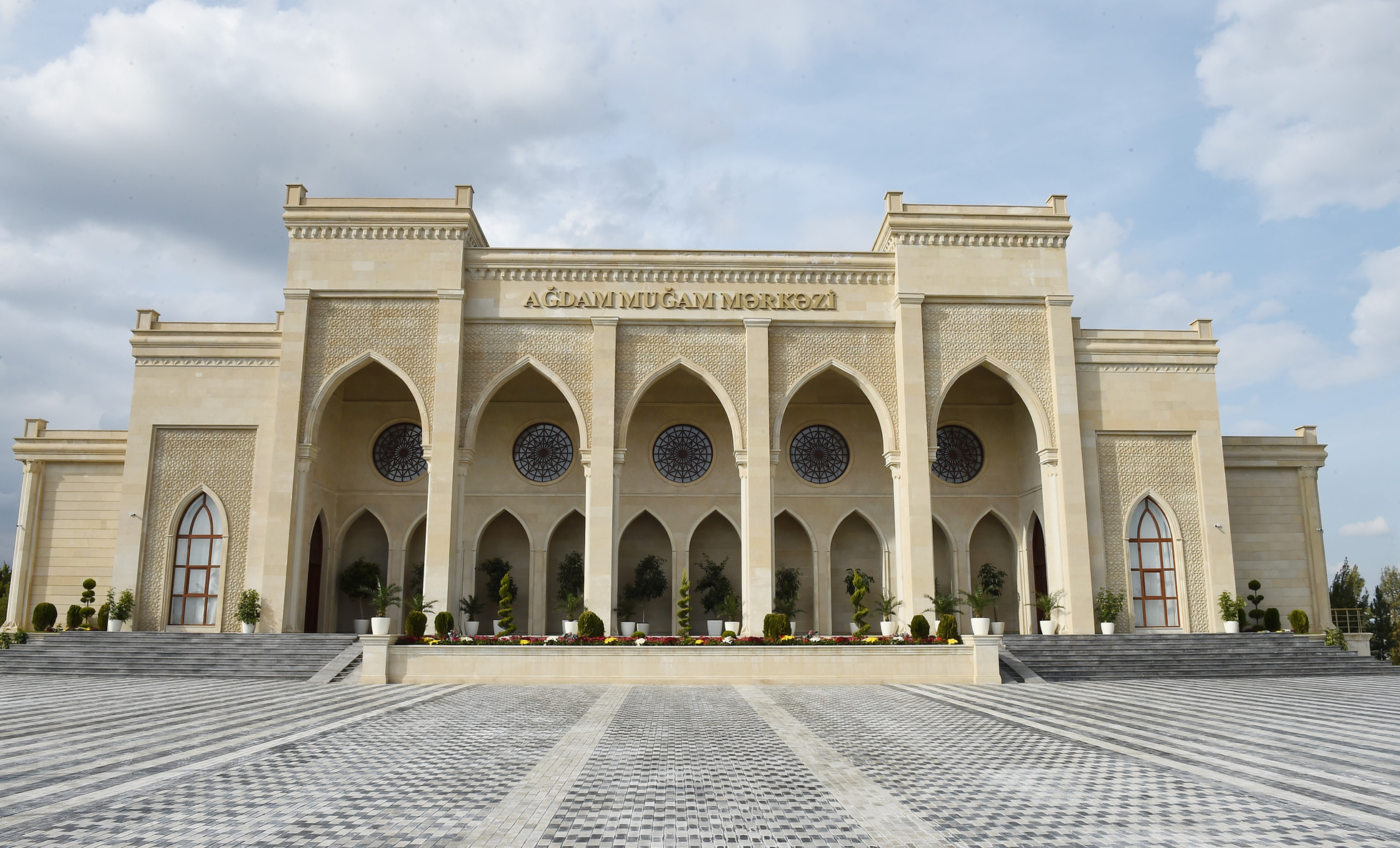
Mugam Center

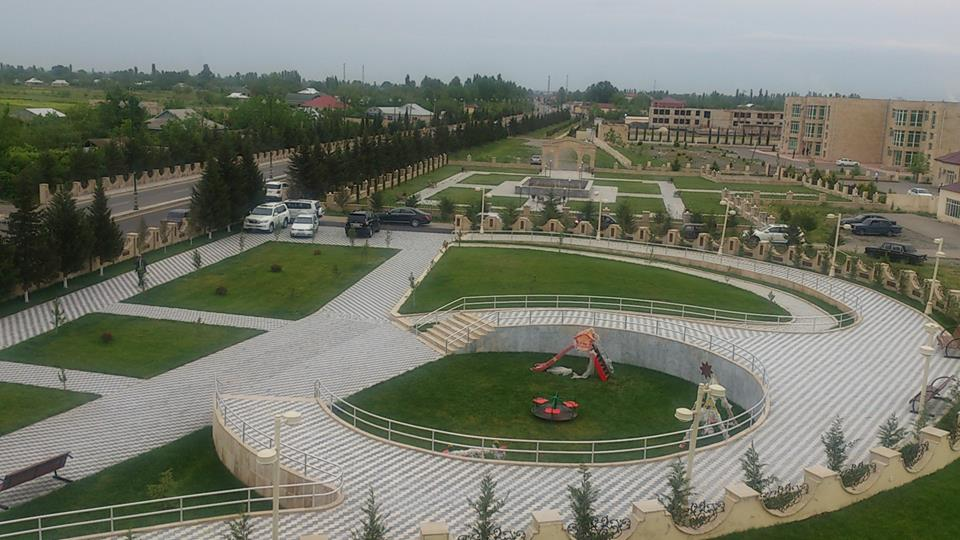
View of Guzanli

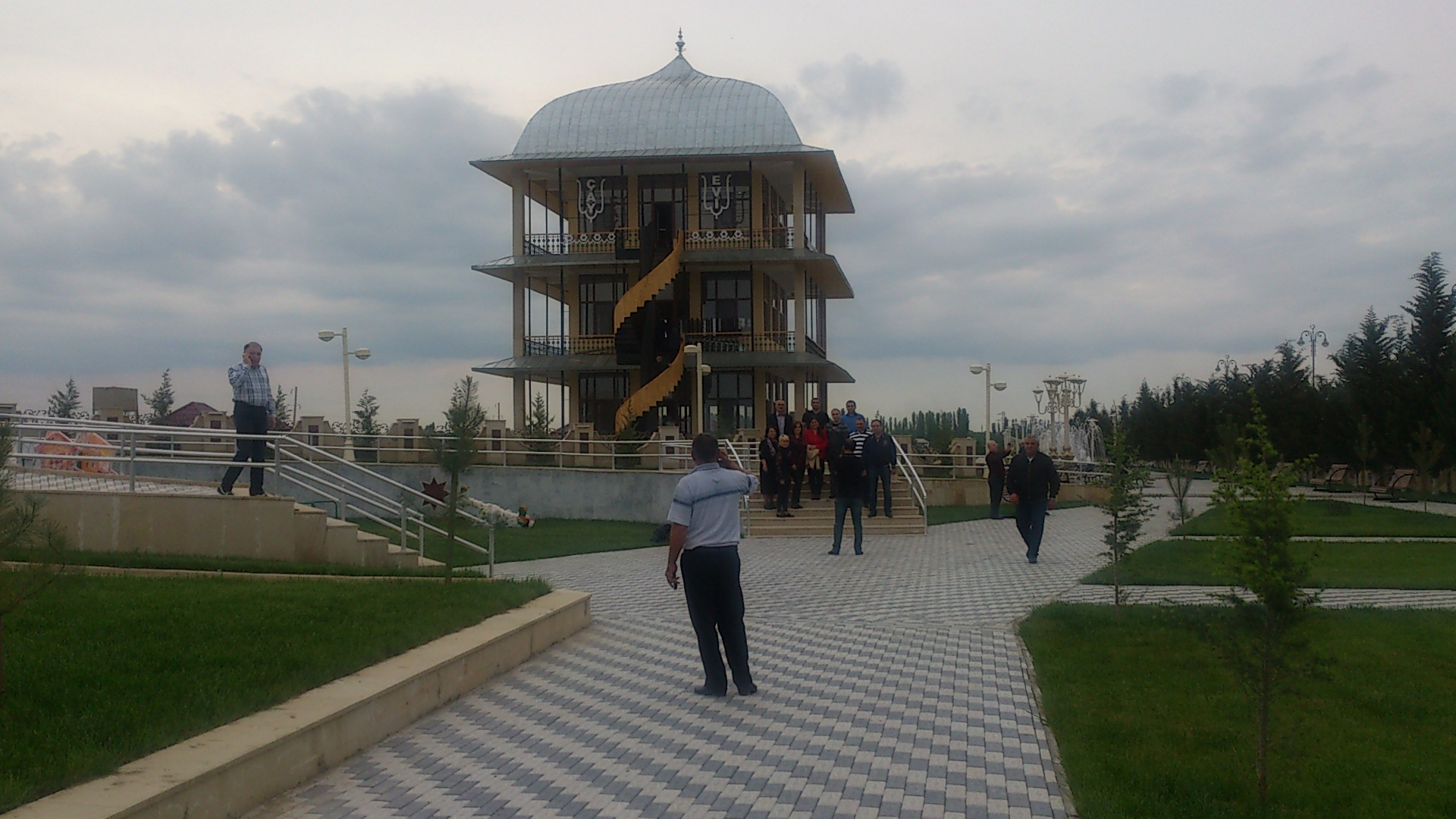
Tea House

Quzanlı (Guzanly) is a village and the most populous municipality in the Aghdam District of Azerbaijan. It has a population of 13,002. The municipality consists of the villages of Guzanly, Birinji Guzanly, Eyvazly, Chullu, and Imamgulubeyli.

Since 2009 Guzanly has been cited as the rather unlikely home to one of Azerbaijan's top football clubs, FK Qarabagh. The team had been based in Baku from 1993 ever since being forced to leave Aghdam where they were originally based. The total depopulation and continued occupation of that city meant that Guzanly, being in the unoccupied sector of Aghdam District, was about as near as they could get to a full "return home".

== Notable natives ==
- Rovshan Huseynov — National Hero of Azerbaijan.

== Archaeology ==
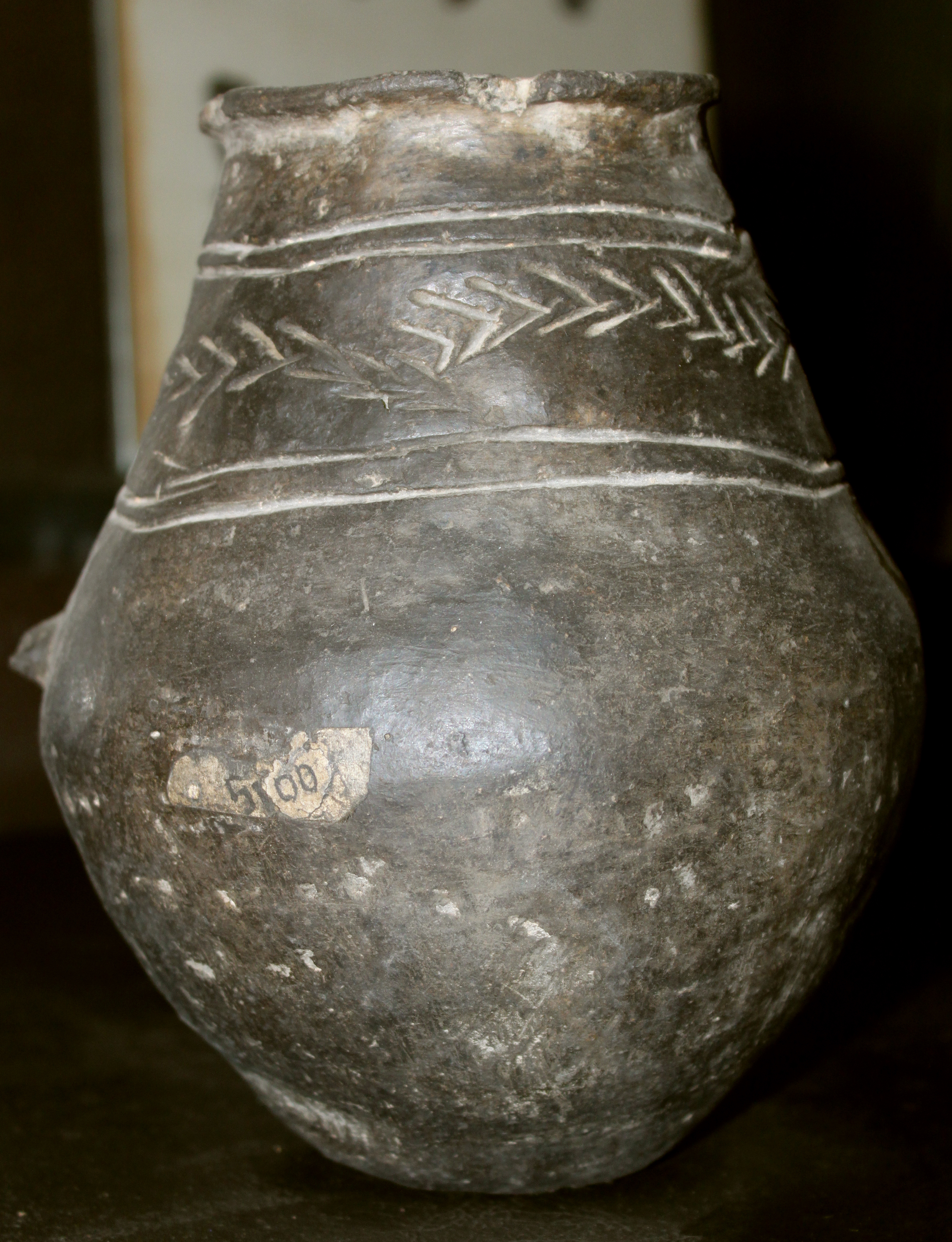
Pottery discovered at the Leyla-Tepe settlement in Guzanly. Nizami Ganjavi Ganja State History-Ethnography Museum

A settlement belonging to the Eneolithic period was discovered in Guzanly.

The surface materials of the monument are divided into two groups. The first group was made of clay with a mixture of sand, with hand, rather rough. Traces of a comb-like tool were preserved on some of them, and the edges of some of them were decorated with scratches.

The second group of ceramics was made of clay with a mixture of plants and baked in red color, sometimes covered with green slip and decorated with black color. These greenish ceramics are similar to Ubaid period ceramics.

The quadrangular buildings discovered during the excavation were divided into several parts by partitions. On the remains of this building, it was determined that there are remains of circular pottery spheres with a diameter of 1 m.

Some of the vessels were made on the potter's wheel.

The ceramics of Leyla-Tape (Leyla-Tepe, Leyla-Tepe culture) differ completely from those of Kultepe-1 and Shomutape in terms of their advanced form and quality, and seem to indicate an intermediate stage between the Eneolithic culture and the Kura–Araxes culture.
