= Qırılı =

- Municipality
- Location within Azerbaijan
- Coordinates: 41°05′31″N 45°30′42″E
- Country: Azerbaijan
- Rayon: Agstafa

Population
  - Total: 3,810
- Time zone: UTC+4 (AZT)
  - Summer (DST): UTC+5 (AZT)

Qırılı (also, Kyryly) is a village and municipality in the Agstafa Rayon of Azerbaijan. It has a population of 3,810.
