= Treaty of Agstafa =

1920 treaty between Azerbaijan and Georgia

The Georgia-Azerbaijan Trade Agreement 1920
- Signed: 12 June 1920
- Location: Aghstafa, Azerbaijan
- Signatories: Azerbaijan Soviet Socialist Republic & Democratic Republic of Georgia

The Treaty of Agstafa, also known somewhat misleadingly as the 1920 Georgia-Azerbaijan Trade Agreement, was a peace agreement between the newly formed Soviet Socialist Republic of Azerbaijan and the pre-soviet Democratic Republic of Georgia. Predating the controversial Treaty of Sèvres by two months it was signed in the town of Aghstafa on June 12, 1920.

== The agreement ==
The treaty agreed a truce between the two countries and an additional 4-point settlement. The first of the treaty's 18 articles called for all hostilities to end between Azerbaijan and Georgia and a return of prisoners of war. The Georgian-Azerbaijani border was confirmed to follow the administrative line that had been used in Tsarist times to separate Tbilisi and Ganja provinces, but the parties failed to agree a compromise on the border delineation of Zaqatala District, an issue that was turned over to an arbitration commission. A trade agreement was also negotiated according to which Azerbaijan would supply Georgia with oil products. This was considered highly undesirable by Soviet Russia whose diplomatic representative in Georgia, Sergey Kirov, took "extreme measures to disrupt", congratulating himself later that the trade agreement, though fully prepared, remained unratified.

=== Signatories ===
The parties to the agreement included the Azerbaijan SSR's Revolutionary Committee Chairman and People's Commissar for Foreign Affairs, Mirza Davud Huseynov, and Georgia's Minister of Defense Grigol Lordkipanidze and Deputy Chairman of the Constituent Assembly, Aleksandre Andronikashvili.

=== Course of the meetings ===
According to the preliminary agreement, the meeting of both delegations was originally to have been held in Aghstafa on 31 May 1920. The Georgian delegation left Tbilisi at 6 pm on May 30, but due to news of disturbances in Ganja, the Azerbaijani delegation could not arrive in Aghstafa at the appointed time. The Georgian delegation received a note from the head of the Azerbaijani delegation, Hamid Sultanov - that he could come to Aghstafa until June 3rd, therefore requesting a temporary postponement. The Georgian delegation went back to Tbilisi, and returned again on June 2. Next morning they walked across the Poilu Bridge which spans the Mtkvari/Kura River, then carried by an Azerbaijani train to Aghstafa arriving at 9 am. The meeting started at 11 am, the delegation having been met by Baku-based Georgian diplomats and the Azerbaijani peace delegation accompanied by the Chairman. Mandates were exchanged, each state recognising the sovereignty and independence of the other.

Political issues, territorial, military and economic issues were then discussed over three days but suspended due to disagreements on June 6 when the Azerbaijani delegation requested a week longpostponement to refer confer with the Baku government. Due to resistance from the Georgian delegation, this was shortened to four days, talks resuming at 8 am on June 9, the Azerbaijani delegation now headed by Mirza-Davud Husseinov. Territorial and border issues continued to caused great controversy, but a working agreement was finally signed at 10 pm on June 12.
