= Hazi Aslanov =

Soviet Azerbaijani general (1910–1945)

- Həzi Aslanov
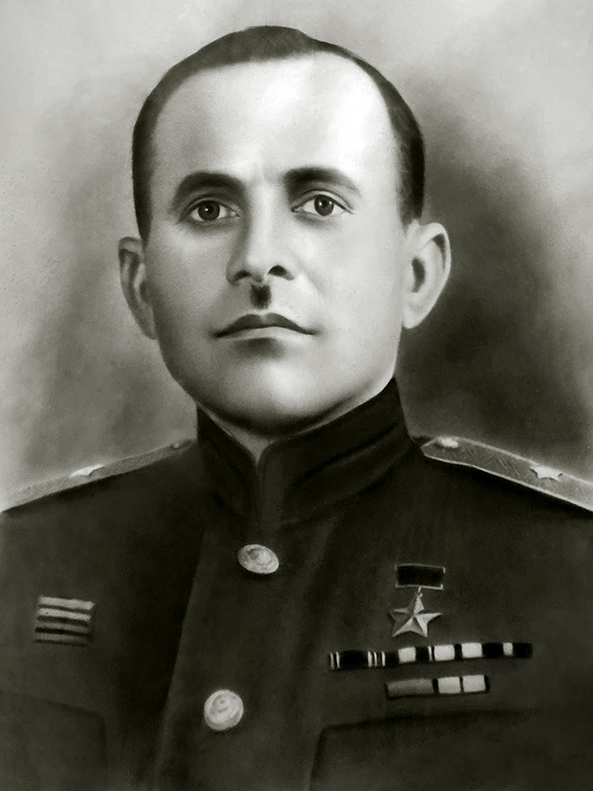
- Aslanov in March 1944
- Born: 4 February 1910; Lankaran, Baku Governorate, Russian Empire
- Died: 25 January 1945 (aged 34); Diždāma, Gramzda Parish, Liepāja County, Latvian SSR, Soviet Union
- Burial place: Martyrs' Lane
- Military career
- Allegiance: Soviet Union
- Branch: Red Army
- Service years: 1929–1945
- Rank: Major General
- Commands: 10th Motor Transport Bataillon; 55th Separate Tank Regiment; 35th Guards Tank Brigade
- Conflicts: Soviet invasion of Poland; Winter War; World War II; Battle of Stalingrad; Operation Bagration
- Awards: Hero of the Soviet Union (2, 1 of them posthumously); Order of Lenin (2); Order of the Red Star; Order of Alexander Nevsky; Order of Suvorov, 2nd Class; Order of the Great Patriotic War, 1st Class (posthumously)

Hazi Ahad oghlu Aslanov (Azerbaijani: Həzi Əhəd oğlu Aslanov, Һәзи Әһәд оғлу Асланов; Russian: Ази Агадович (also Агад оглы, Ахадович, Ахад оглы) Асланов; commonly described as Azi Aslanov or A. A. Aslanov, 4 February [O.S. 22 January] 1910 – 25 January 1945) was an Azerbaijani major-general of the Soviet armoured troops during World War II. He was awarded the Hero of the Soviet Union title twice. The second Hero title was posthumously awarded in 1991, by Mikhail Gorbachev, at the constant recommendations by Heydar Aliyev.

== Early life and prewar service ==
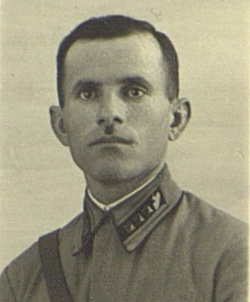
Aslanov before 1943

Listed in military records as an Azerbaijani, Hazi Aslanov was born on 4 February [O.S. 22 January] 1910, in Lankaran, Russian Empire (now Azerbaijan), to a family of Talysh ethnicity. The son of a brick factory worker, Aslanov received incomplete secondary education. After his father died in 1923, Aslanov took his place at the Lankaran Brick Factory, while completing Likbez educational courses.

Aslanov chose a military career and entered the Transcaucasian Military Preparatory School in Baku as a cadet in October 1924. After graduating from the school, he was transferred to the Borosoglebsk-Leningrad Cavalry School in August 1929 to receive command training. Upon his graduation in June 1931, Aslanov was posted to the Ukrainian Military District, where he began active service as a platoon commander in the 15th Cavalry Regiment of the 3rd Cavalry Division, stationed at Berdichev. Aslanov's cavalry service proved brief, and in August he was transferred to command a platoon of the 2nd Cavalry Corps's 12th Armored Car Battalion, beginning his career in the Red Army's emerging armored forces. Aslanov was transferred for the second time that year on 12 December to command a platoon in the Vehicle Repair Workshops at Kharkov.

Aslanov was transferred to the Separate Tank Company of the 2nd Caucasian Rifle Division in June 1933, where he commanded a platoon. He later rose to the posts of assistant company commander for equipment and company commander with the divisional Separate Tank Company. Promoted to senior lieutenant in 1936, he was accepted to the Communist Party in 1937.

In May 1938, Aslanov was appointed chief of the school of the Separate Tank Battalion of the division, which had been renamed the 60th Rifle Division. The tank battalion had been expanded from the pre-existing tank company. Promoted to captain in February 1939, his next assignment was as an assistant battalion commander for training and combat units with the 3rd Training Motor Transport Regiment at Kiev. In this role, he took part in the Soviet invasion of Poland with the forces advancing into western Ukraine and the breakthrough of the Mannerheim Line during the fighting on the Karelian Isthmus in the Winter War. In August 1940, he was transferred to command the Motor Transport Battalion of the 10th Motor Rifle Regiment of the Kiev Special Military District's newly formed 10th Tank Division. Aslanov was promoted to major in November 1940.

== Eastern Front ==
After Germany invaded the Soviet Union, Aslanov commanded the regimental Motor Transport Battalion in the border battles and the Battle of Kiev. In August 1941, he replaced the injured commander of a tank battalion. In the fierce battles near Shostka, Bakhmach and Pyriatyn, his tank commanders fought to the last tank, while Aslanov personally led his battalion in the attack. In one of these battles, Aslanov received two bullet wounds in his right leg and a severe shrapnel wound to the head, but despite these injuries, he continued to fight. When the battalion lost all of its tanks, he was appointed assistant commander of the 10th Motor Rifle Regiment for equipment on 25 August. In this role, he fought in the region of Pyriatyn, Okhtyrka, Bohodukhiv and Kharkiv. With the surviving officers, Aslanov was placed in Southwestern Front reserve of command personnel in late 1941, and in January 1942 he was promoted to lieutenant colonel, placed at the disposal of the Commander of the Armored and Mechanized Forces in Moscow.

Aslanov was appointed deputy commander of the 55th Tank Brigade in February, but did not join the unit until May. Through this delay he avoided the destruction of the brigade in the Battle of the Kerch Peninsula. The 55th Tank Brigade was assigned to the 28th Tank Corps and took part in the Battle of Stalingrad. The brigade was reorganized as the 55th Separate Tank Regiment in October, reassigned to the 4th Mechanized Corps, and Aslanov, by then a lieutenant colonel, appointed its commander. Aslanov led the regiment, in the Soviet counteroffensive at Stalingrad, and was awarded the title Hero of the Soviet Union on 22 December. For its performance, his regiment became the 41st Guards Tank Regiment on 26 December, while the corps became the 3rd Guards Mechanized Corps. The regiment was reorganized as the 35th Guards Tank Brigade on 20 April 1943, and Aslanov continued in command.

Aslanov led the brigade in the Rostov offensive, the Mius offensive, and the Battle of the Dnieper during 1943. For his performance, Aslanov, by then a colonel, was awarded the Order of Alexander Nevsky on 15 April and the Order of the Red Banner on 14 November. In December, he was sent to the Academic Courses for the Improvement of Officers at the Military Academy of the Armored and Mechanized Forces for further training.

After completing the courses, Aslanov returned to command the 35th Guards Tank Brigade in April 1944, having promoted to major general on 13 March. During the summer of 1944, Aslanov led the brigade in Operation Bagration, during which it forced a crossing of the Berezina on 28 June. With a battalion of submachine gunners and one armored vehicle, Aslanov linked up with fifty Belorussian partisans along a road and penetrated the German rear, taking the town of Pleshchenitsy, opening the road up for the advance of the main forces of the corps. Continuing the offensive, the brigade liberated Vileyka on 2 July and Smorgon two days later. For his performance in the operation, Aslanov was awarded a second Order of the Red Banner on 31 July and the Order of Suvorov, 2nd class, on 23 July.

The funeral of Hazi Aslanov in Baku

Subsequently, Aslanov led the brigade in the Šiauliai offensive, during which it took Šiauliai and forced a crossing of the Western Dvina. He continued to command the brigade in the Riga Offensive, the Memel Offensive, and the blockade of the Courland Pocket. For his performance Aslanov received a third Order of the Red Banner on 7 January 1945. During the Soviet offensive against the Courland Pocket that began on 23 January, Aslanov's brigade was sent into action on the Pauzeri and Ceļmaļi axis. Finding impassable swamps and minefields along its march route, the brigade conducted a flanking maneuver to the right and reached Katrīnes manor, where it encountered strong German resistance that stalled its advance. At 11:00 on 24 January, Aslanov arrived to the brigade command post at Dižkrogs, where he was soon seriously wounded in the head, neck and chest by a nearby shell explosion during an artillery strike on his command post. He was evacuated to Field Mobile Surgical Hospital No. 4396 at Diždāma, where he died on 25 January. Aslanov's brigade was pulled out of action that day, having lost fifty tanks in two days of fighting. On 27 January, Aslanov was posthumously awarded the Order of the Patriotic War, 1st degree, for his leadership of the brigade.

== Awards and honors ==
Aslanov received his first star in 1943 for his performance at Stalingrad. The second was supposed to be given for the crossing of the Berezina river, under the recommendation of General of the Army Ivan Chernyakhovsky, but he received it posthumously, 46 years later, on 21 June 1991, after a special appeal by Azerbaijani intelligentsia to Mikhail Gorbachev. He received the following decorations:

Twice Hero of the Soviet Union (22 December 1942, 21 June 1991 posthumously)
Twice Order of Lenin (22 December 1942, 21 June 1991 posthumously)
Thrice Order of the Red Banner (14 November 1943, 31 July 1944, 7 January 1945)
Order of Suvorov, 2nd class (22 July 1944)
Order of Alexander Nevsky (15 April 1943)
Medal "For Courage" (12 May 1942)
Order of the Patriotic War, 1st class (27 January 1945 posthumously)
Twice Order of the Red Star (29 June 1942, 3 November 1944)
Medal "For the Defence of Stalingrad" (1942)
Medal "For the Defence of the Caucasus" (1944)

Aslanov is commemorated by monuments in Dağüstü Park in Baku, Lankaran, and Vileyka. A memorial tablet with his name is on Mamayev Kurgan and a stele in the settlement of Oktyabrsky, Volgograd Oblast. The new Hazi Aslanov station of the Baku Metro was named after him in 2002. A street in Volgograd is named for him, as well as a tanker and schools in Baku and Volgograd. A village in Agstafa region carries his name and his house museum functions in Lankaran.

== Gallery ==
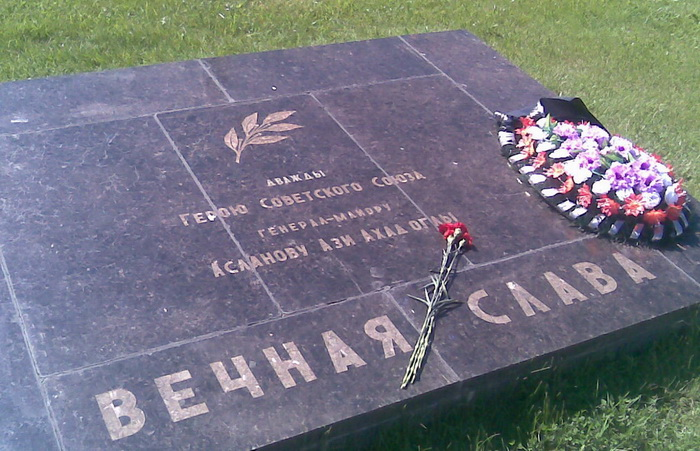
Granite memorial plate in memory of Hazi Aslanov on Mamayev Kurgan

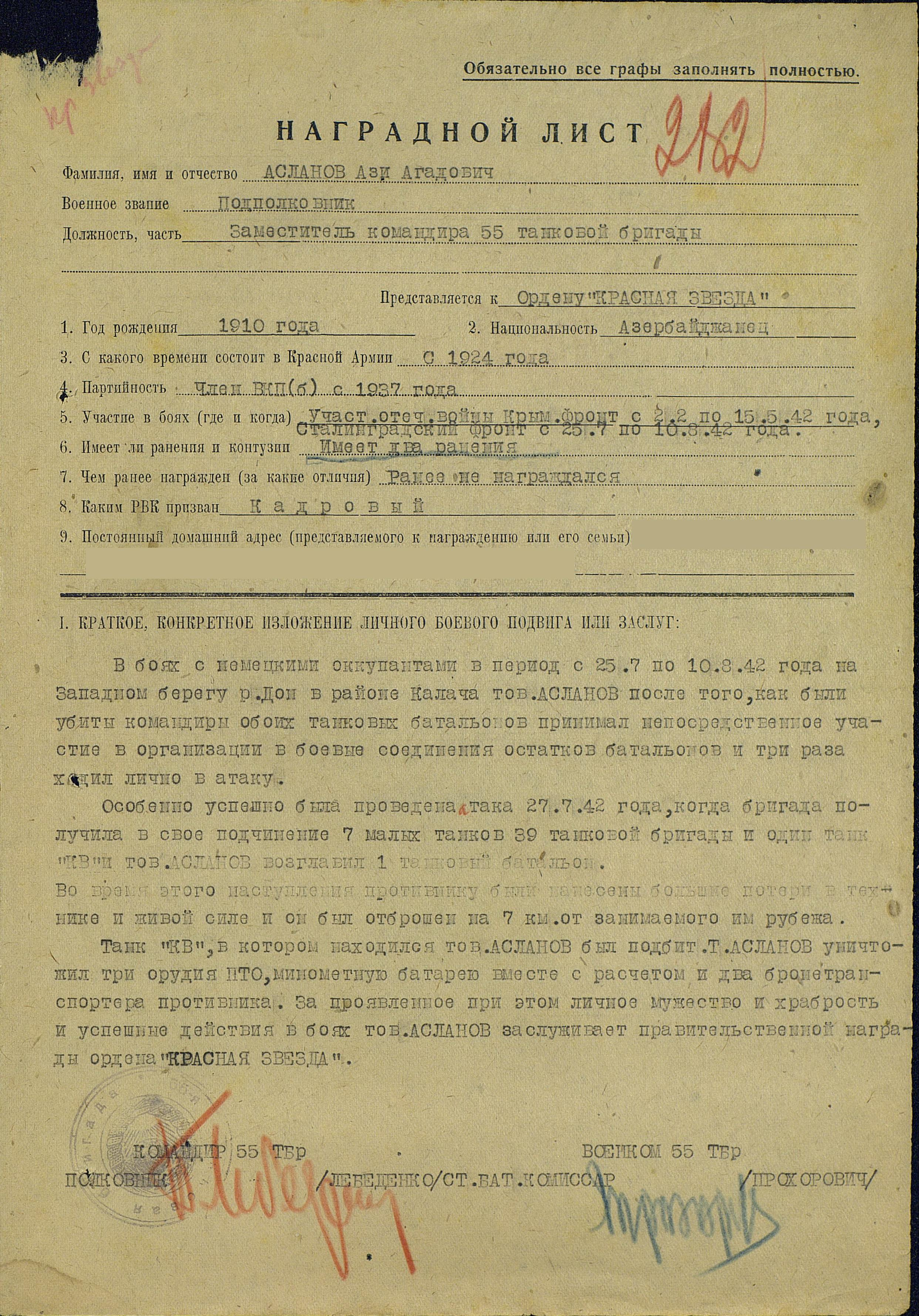
Award sheet for the Order of the Red Star
