= Aghstafa Airport =

- IATA: none; ICAO: UBBA

Summary
- Coordinates: 41°07′24″N 45°25′17″E

Map
- Location of Aghstafa Airport Aghstafa Airport (Europe)

Aghstafa Airport (ICAO: UBBA) is an airport serving the city of Aghstafa in Azerbaijan.
