= Həzi Aslanov, Azerbaijan =

Coordinates: 41°17′N 45°15′E

Həzi Aslanov is a village in the municipality of Köçvəlili in the Agstafa Rayon of Azerbaijan. The village is named after Azi Aslanov, a Soviet military leader.
