= Böyük Kəsik =

- Municipality
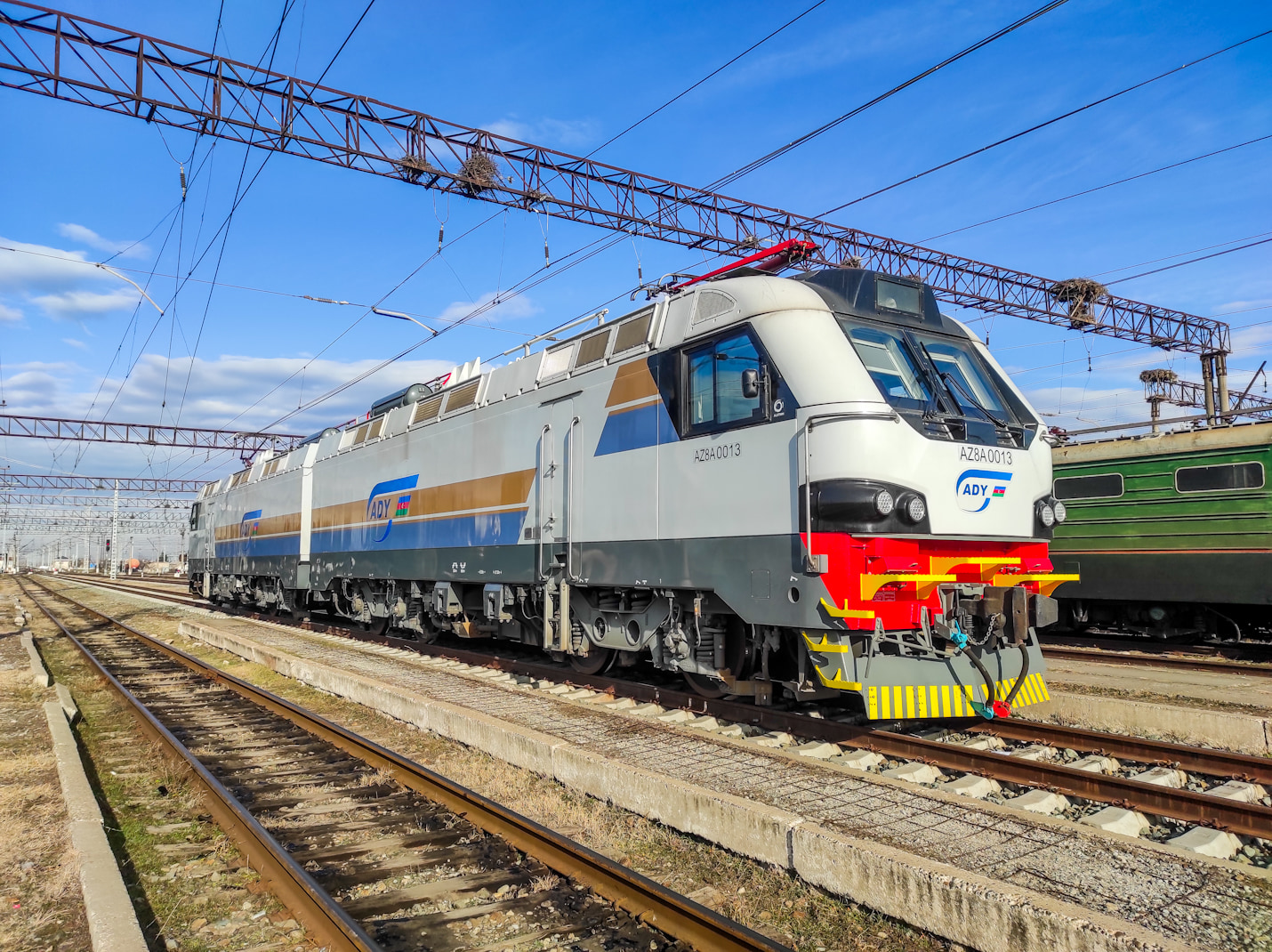

- Location within Azerbaijan
- Coordinates: 41°23′18″N 45°11′22″E
- Country: Azerbaijan
- Rayon: Aghstafa
- Elevation: 268 m (879 ft)

Population
  - Total: 1,791
- Time zone: UTC+4 (AZT)
  - Summer (DST): UTC+5 (AZT)

Böyük Kəsik (formerly, V.İ.Lenin) is a village and municipality in the Aghstafa District of Azerbaijan. It has a population of 1,791.

== Archaeology ==
An important Chalcolithic archaeological site is located near the village. It is known as Boyuk Kesik (Beyuk Kesik), and it is connected with the Leyla-Tepe culture ceramics going back to 4400-3900 BC. According to Catherine Marro (2022), Böyük Kesik represented an earlier development of the Leyla-Tepe culture, similar to the contemporary pottery of Ovçular Tepesi, another Leyla Tepe site located in the Kura basin.

Boyuk Kesik is located very close to Soyuqbulaq, Agstafa, another very important ancient site.

== See also ==
- Galayeri
- Poylu, Agstafa
- Baku–Tbilisi–Kars railway
