= Birinci Quzanlı =

Village in Aghdam District, Azerbaijan

Birinci Quzanlı (Birinji Guzanly) is a village in the municipality of Guzanly in the Aghdam District of Azerbaijan.
