= Poylu, Poylu =

Poylu
- Location within Azerbaijan
- Coordinates: 41°13′53″N 45°26′36″E
- Country: Azerbaijan
- Rayon: Agstafa
- Municipality: Poylu
- Time zone: UTC+4 (AZT)
  - Summer (DST): UTC+5 (AZT)

Poylu (also, Poyli) is a village in the Agstafa Rayon of Azerbaijan. The village forms part of the municipality of Poylu.
