= Bənövşələr =

- Location within Azerbaijan Location within Karabakh Economic Region
- Coordinates: 40°07′44″N 47°03′44″E
- Country: Azerbaijan
- Rayon: Agdam
- Municipality: Əhmədağalı
- Time zone: UTC+4 (AZT)
  - Summer (DST): UTC+5 (AZT)

Bənövşələr (Banovshalar) is a village in the Agdam District of Azerbaijan. The village forms part of the municipality of Əhmədağalı.
