= Qarayazı, Agstafa =

Qarayazı
- Location within Azerbaijan
- Coordinates: 41°18′14″N 45°14′14″E
- Country: Azerbaijan
- Rayon: Agstafa
- Municipality: Köçvəlili
- Time zone: UTC+4 (AZT)
  - Summer (DST): UTC+5 (AZT)

Qarayazı is a village in the Agstafa Rayon of Azerbaijan. The village forms part of the municipality of Köçvəlili.
