= Alibala Hajizade =

Azerbaijani writer (born 1935)

Alibala Hajizade (born 28 August 1935, died on 8 October 2009) was an Azerbaijani writer.

== Bibliography ==
Writer Alibala Hajizade was born in Ağalıkənd, Biləsuvar region. He studied in the Persian department of Azerbaijan State University. He began acting as a junior scientific worker in the Near and Middle East Institute of Azerbaijan National Academy of Sciences. He worked as a translator in Afghanistan in 1966-70s. Furthermore, he is considered one of the best writers whose works were printed with the highest draws. His novels such as "Ayrılıgın sonu yoxmuş"("Endless divergency"), "Dünyanı tanı"("Know the world"), "Vəfalım menim"("My loyal") have been repeatedly published. He died on 8 October 2009.

== Works ==
- "Heykəl gülür" (The monument laughs) (stories), Baku, Uşaqgəncnəşr, 1961, 54 pages
- Unutmaq olmur (Forgetting is impossible) (novelette), Baku, Uşaqgəncnəşr, 1963, 115 pages
- Məhəbbət olmayan evdə (At home without love) (novelette), Baku, Azərnəşr, 1965, 100 pages
- Fərruxi Yəzdinin poeziyası (Farrux Yazdi's poetry), Baku, Eım, 1965, 198 pages
- Cehiz(Dowry) (stories), Baku, Gənclik, 1969, 154 pages
- Pəhləvan (Giant) (stories), Baku, Gənclik, 1974, 31 pages
- Təyyarə kölgəsi (Shadow of plane) (novel), Baku, Gənclik, 1974, 287 pages (repeatedly edition:1992)
- İtkin gəlin (Missed bride) (novel), Baku, Gənclik, 1979, 215 pages
- Əfsanəsiz illər (Years without Afsana) (novel), Baku, Gənclik, 1983,353 pages
- Ayrılığın sonu yoxmuş. (Endless divergency) Baku, Gənclik, 1983, 432 pages
- Vəfalım mənim. (My loyal) Baku, Gənclik, 1985, 344 pages (repeatedly edition:1992)
- Dünyanı tanı. (Know the world ) Baku, Gənclik, 1990, 450 pages
- İtkin gəlin (Missed bride) (novel, trilogy) 1st book. Baku, Azərnəşr, 1992
- İtkin gəlin (Missed bride) (novel, trilogy) 2nd book. Baku, Azərnəşr, 1992
- İtkin gəlin (Missed bride) (novel, trilogy) 3rd book. Baku, Azərnəşr, 1992
- Sevəcəyəm (I shall love) (poems, stories), Baku, Diplomat, 2001, 170 pages
- Əsərləri (Works) (10 volumes), 1st volume, Baku, Nafta-Press, 2004, 501 pages
