= Əhmədağalı =

- Municipality
- Location within Azerbaijan Location within Karabakh Economic Region
- Coordinates: 40°07′05″N 47°04′58″E
- Country: Azerbaijan
- District: Aghdam

Population
  - Total: 2,563
- Time zone: UTC+4 (AZT)

Əhmədağalı (Ahmedaghaly) is a village and municipality in the Aghdam District of Azerbaijan. It has a population of 2,563. The municipality consists of the villages of Əhmədağalı, Mirəşelli, and Bənövşələr.
