= Çullu (İmamqulubəyli), Agdam =

Çullu
- Location within Azerbaijan Location within Karabakh Economic Region
- Coordinates: 40°10′N 47°09′E
- Country: Azerbaijan
- Rayon: Agdam
- Municipality: Quzanlı
- Time zone: UTC+4 (AZT)
  - Summer (DST): UTC+5 (AZT)

Çullu (Chullu) is a village in the Agdam District of Azerbaijan. The village forms part of the municipality of Quzanlı.
