= Mirəşelli =

- Location within Azerbaijan Location within Karabakh Economic Region
- Coordinates: 40°08′18″N 47°02′51″E
- Country: Azerbaijan
- Rayon: Agdam
- Municipality: Əhmədağalı
- Time zone: UTC+4 (AZT)
  - Summer (DST): UTC+5 (AZT)

Mirəşelli (also, Mirəşəlli, Mirashali, Mirasheli, and Mirashelli) is a village in the Agdam Rayon of Azerbaijan. The village forms part of the municipality of Əhmədağalı.
