= Poylu, Samukh =

Poylu
- Municipality
- Location within Azerbaijan
- Coordinates: 41°08′31″N 46°16′06″E
- Country: Azerbaijan
- Rayon: Samukh

Population
  - Total: 568
- Time zone: UTC+4 (AZT)
  - Summer (DST): UTC+5 (AZT)

Poylu is a village and municipality in the Samukh Rayon of Azerbaijan. It has a population of 568.
