= Çullu, Jabrayil =

Çullu
- Location within Azerbaijan
- Coordinates: 39°24′23″N 46°42′50″E
- Country: Azerbaijan
- District: Jabrayil
- Time zone: UTC+4 (AZT)

Çullu (Chullu) is a village situated on Goyan steppe, 27 km west of the city of Jabrayil, within the Dagh Tumas administrative-territorial unit of Jabrayil District, Azerbaijan.

== Toponym ==
According to the "Encyclopaedic Dictionary of Toponyms of Azerbaijan", the village was originally called Chollu. This name was associated with the name of the Chol tribe of Hunnic origin.

== History ==
During the years of the Russian Empire, Chullu village was part of Jabrayil district, Elizavetpol province.

During the Soviet years, the village was part of Jabrayil district, Azerbaijan SSR. The village was captured by Armenian forces in the First Karabakh War and was destroyed.

On 28 October 2020, Azerbaijani President Ilham Aliyev said that Chullu village in Jabrayil district was liberated and returned under the control of the Azerbaijani Armed Forces.

== Population ==
According to the “Code of statistical data of the Transcaucasian region population, extracted from the family lists of 1886”, in the village of Chullu, Kovshutli rural district, Jabrayil district, there were 22 dym and 88 residents Azerbaijanis (listed as “Tatars”), who were Shiites by religion and peasants.

According to the “Caucasian Calendar” for 1912, 165 people lived in the village of Chullu, Karyagin district, mostly Azerbaijanis, listed as “Tatars”.

According to the publication “Administrative Division of the ASSR”, prepared in 1933 by the Department of National Economic Accounting of the Azerbaijan SSR (AzNEA), as of 1 January 1933, in the village of Chullu, which was part of Dagh Tumas village council, Jabrayil district of Azerbaijan SSR, there were 35 farms and 184 residents. The entire population of the village council was formed by Azerbaijanis (in the source - “Turks”).
