= İmamqulubəyli, Agdam =

Imamgulubeyli
- Azerbaijani: İmamqulubəyli
- Location within Azerbaijan Location within Karabakh Economic Region
- Coordinates: 40°11′08″N 47°08′33″E
- Country: Azerbaijan
- District: Aghdam
- Municipality: Guzanly
- Time zone: UTC+4 (AZT)
  - Summer (DST): UTC+5 (AZT)

İmamqulubəyli (Imamgulubeyli) is a town in the Aghdam District of Azerbaijan.
