= Ağalıkənd =

- Municipality
- Location within Azerbaijan
- Country: Azerbaijan
- Rayon: Bilasuvar

Population
  - Total: 3,848
- Time zone: UTC+4 (AZT)

Ağalıkənd is a village and municipality in the Bilasuvar Rayon of Azerbaijan. It has a population of 3,848.
