= Şəkərli, Salyan =

Şəkərli
- Municipality
- Location within Azerbaijan
- Coordinates: 39°41′N 49°04′E
- Country: Azerbaijan
- Rayon: Salyan

Population
  - Total: 2,204
- Time zone: UTC+4 (AZT)
  - Summer (DST): UTC+5 (AZT)

Şəkərli (also, Shekerli and Shakirly) is a village and municipality in the Salyan Rayon of Azerbaijan. It has a population of 2,204.
