= Dağ Kəsəmən =

- Municipality
- Location within Azerbaijan
- Coordinates: 41°07′13″N 45°20′47″E
- Country: Azerbaijan
- Rayon: Agstafa
- Elevation: 508 m (1,667 ft)

Population
  - Total: 6,866
- Time zone: UTC+4 (AZT)
  - Summer (DST): UTC+5 (AZT)

Dağ Kəsəmən (also, Dagkesaman) is a village and the most populous municipality, except for the capital Ağstafa, in the Agstafa Rayon of Azerbaijan. It has a population of 6,866.
