= Qarayazı, Goychay =

Qarayazı
- Municipality
- Location within Azerbaijan
- Coordinates: 40°37′45″N 47°58′55″E
- Country: Azerbaijan
- Rayon: Goychay

Population
  - Total: 2,131
- Time zone: UTC+4 (AZT)
  - Summer (DST): UTC+5 (AZT)

Qarayazı (also, Karayazy) is a village and municipality in the Goychay Rayon of Azerbaijan. It has a population of 2,131.
