= Chullu, Charuymaq =

Chullu چوللو
- Village
- Location within Iran
- Coordinates: 36°53′34″N 47°14′40″E
- Country: Iran
- Province: East Azerbaijan
- County: Charuymaq
- Bakhsh: Shadian
- Rural District: Charuymaq-e Jonubesharqi

Population (2006)
  - Total: 17
- Time zone: UTC+3:30 (IRST)
  - Summer (DST): UTC+4:30 (IRDT)

Chullu (Persian: چوللو, also Romanized as Chūllū; also known as Chollū) is a village in Charuymaq-e Jonubesharqi Rural District, Shadian District, Charuymaq County, East Azerbaijan Province, Iran. At the 2006 census, its population was 17, in 4 families.
