= Muğanlı, Agstafa =

Mughanly
- Municipality
- Azerbaijani: Muğanlı
- Location within Azerbaijan
- Coordinates: 41°20′39″N 45°11′42″E
- Country: Azerbaijan
- Rayon: Agstafa

Population
  - Total: 2,445
- Time zone: UTC+4 (AZT)
  - Summer (DST): UTC+5 (AZT)

Muğanlı (also, Mughanly) is a village and municipality in the Agstafa District of Azerbaijan. It has a population of 2,445.
