= Eyvazlı, Agdam =

Eyvazly
- Azerbaijani: Eyvazlı
- Location within Azerbaijan Location within Karabakh Economic Region
- Coordinates: 40°08′27″N 47°09′09″E
- Country: Azerbaijan
- District: Aghdam
- Municipality: Quzanlı
- Time zone: UTC+4 (AZT)
  - Summer (DST): UTC+5 (AZT)

Eyvazlı (Note: Transliterated as Eyvazly) is a village in the Aghdam District of Azerbaijan. The village forms part of the municipality of Guzanly.
