= Köçəsgər =

- Municipality
- Location within Azerbaijan
- Coordinates: 41°03′33″N 45°31′21″E
- Country: Azerbaijan
- Rayon: Agstafa

Population
  - Total: 5,223
- Time zone: UTC+4 (AZT)
  - Summer (DST): UTC+5 (AZT)

Köçəsgər (also, Köçəskər, Kechasker, and Köçäsgär) is a village and municipality in the Agstafa Rayon of Azerbaijan. It has a population of 5,223.
