= Poylu, Agstafa =

Poylu
- Municipality
- Location within Azerbaijan
- Coordinates: 41°09′36″N 45°27′08″E
- Country: Azerbaijan
- Rayon: Agstafa

Population
  - Total: 4,302
- Time zone: UTC+4 (AZT)
  - Summer (DST): UTC+5 (AZT)

Poylu is a village and municipality in the Aghstafa District of Azerbaijan. It has a population of 4,302. The municipality consists of the villages of Poylu and Şəkərli, and second village called Poylu. The place where the village is has been part of the georgian kingdom of Kartli. Between the years 1919-1920 the municipality of Poylu was part of the Democratic republic of Georgia.

== Archaeology ==
The ancient Poylu II Settlement was discovered during the construction of the Baku–Tbilisi–Ceyhan pipeline.

Excavations revealed several occupational phases. The lowermost layer shows a late Eneolithic period of domestic occupation, dating to the early fourth millennium BC. A multilayer settlement of Leylatepe culture is attested. The Leylatepe deposits start at the natural soil layer. A small amount of Kura–Araxes culture material was also recorded at the depth of between 70 cm and 110 cm. Yet no clearly defined cultural layer is formed by these deposits.

== See also ==
- Galayeri
- Böyük Kəsik
