= Agstafa =

Agstafa Ağstafa
- City and Municipality
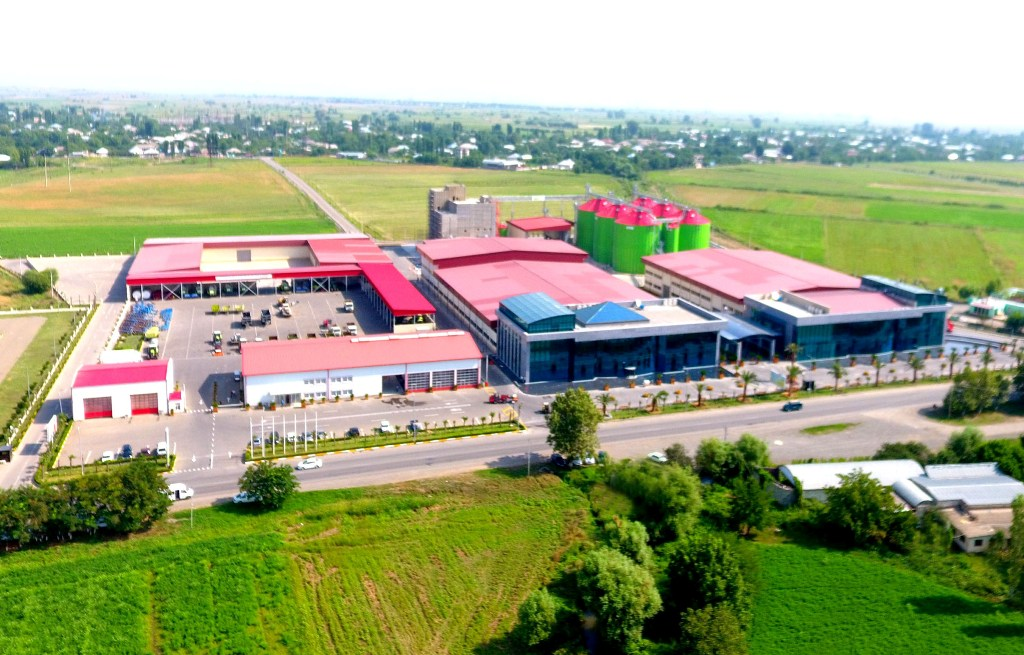
- Agstafa agro-industry complex

- Location within Azerbaijan
- Coordinates: 41°07′08″N 45°27′14″E
- Country: Azerbaijan
- District: Aghstafa
- Elevation: 340 m (1,120 ft)

Population (2010)
  - Total: 20,200
- Time zone: UTC+4 (AZT)
- Area code: +992 244

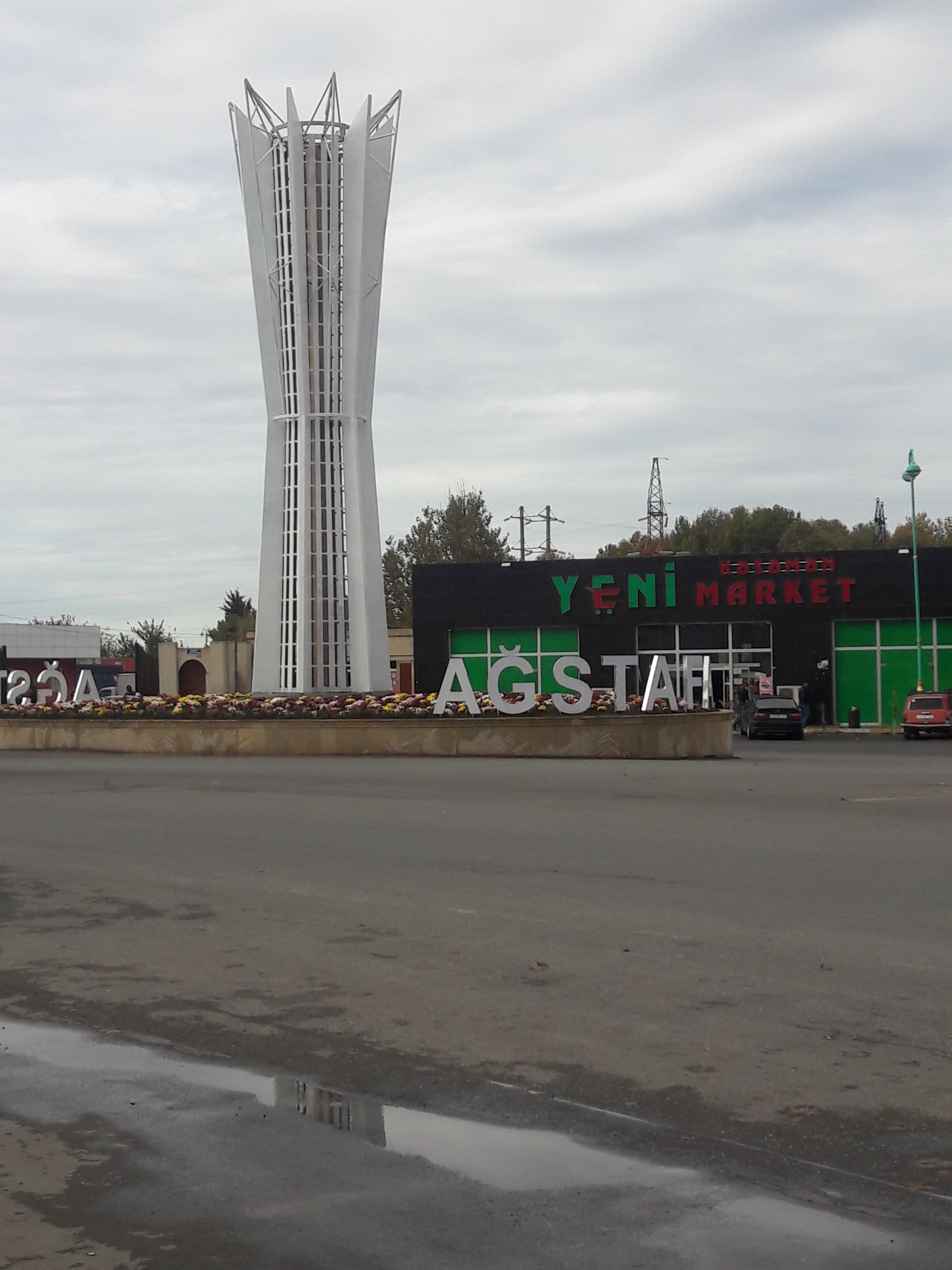
Ağstafa

Agstafa (Azerbaijani: Ağstafa) is a town, municipality (assigned in 1941) and the capital of the Aghstafa District of Azerbaijan. Agstafa district was established in 1939, abolished in 1959 and merged with Gazakh district, and made into an independent district again in 1990.

== History ==
Historical reference books of Agstafa indicate that the city appeared in the second half of the nineteenth century, essentially built as a new town around the construction of the Baku-Tbilisi railway. The town was known initially as Elisavetinka, for the Russian royal, though the station did take its name from a pre-existing small village of Agstafa, which grew more important from 1914 as the junction stop for a new branch line to Yerevan. In 1920, with the region still rocked by the fallout of the 1920 Ganja Revolt, the Treaty of Agstafa was negotiated here between the newly Sovietised Republic of Azerbaijan and the then still-independent Democratic Republic of Georgia.

Agstafa received city status in 1941.

== Geographical position ==
There is one city (Aghstafa), 9 settlements (Vurgun, Poylu, Shekarli, Jeyranchol, Saloglu, Soyugbulag, Soyugbulag, Hazi Aslanov, Garayazy) and 29 villages in the region. These settlements are managed by 29 administrative territorial representations and 29 municipalities.

== Population ==
Of the Agstafa region population of 88,458 as of January 2020, as many as 21,817 people live in the city and 66,562 in villages. 43,562 men and 44,817 women make up the population of the region.

== Transport ==
Agstafa has a large urban transport system, mostly managed by the Ministry of Transportation.

=== Air ===
Aghstafa Airport, is not fully functioninal.

=== Rail ===
Kars–Tbilisi–Baku railway will directly connect the city with Turkey and Georgia.

The city sits on one of the Azerbaijani primary rail lines running east–west connecting the capital, Baku, with the rest of the country. The Kars–Tbilisi–Baku railway runs along the line through the city. The railway provides both human transportation and transport of goods and commodities such as oil and gravel.

Agstafa's Central Railway Station is the terminus for national and international rail links to the city. The Kars–Tbilisi–Baku railway, which will directly connect Turkey, Georgia and Azerbaijan, began to be constructed in 2007 and is scheduled for completion in 2015. The completed branch will connect the city with Tbilisi in Georgia, and from there trains will continue to Akhalkalaki, and Kars in Turkey.
