= Aghstafa District =

District in northwestern Azerbaijan

Coordinates: 41°07′08″N 45°27′14″E

- District
- Map of Azerbaijan showing Aghstafa District
- Country: Azerbaijan
- Region: Gazakh-Tovuz
- Established: 24 April 1990
- Capital: Aghstafa
- Settlements: 39

Government
  - Governor: Seymur Orujov

Area
  - Total: 1,500 km^{2} (580 sq mi)

Population (2020)
  - Total: 88,500
  - Density: 59/km^{2} (150/sq mi)
- Time zone: UTC+4 (AZT)
- Postal code: 0500
- Website: agstafa-ih.gov.az

Aghstafa District (Azerbaijani: Ağstafa rayonu) is one of the 66 districts of Azerbaijan. Located in the northwest of the country, it belongs to the Gazakh-Tovuz Economic Region. The district borders the districts of Qazakh, Tovuz, as well as the Kakheti and Kvemo Kartli regions of Georgia. Its capital and largest city is Aghstafa. As of 2020, the district had a population of 88,500.

== Overview ==
Aghstafa District was created on 24 January 1939 as an independent administrative unit out of the larger Qazakh region of Azerbaijan. On 4 December 1959, the status of the district was abolished and it was incorporated into Qazakh District. On 14 April 1990, by the decree of the Council of Deputies of Azerbaijan SSR, it was split from Qazakh District and was again re-established as a separate district. The regional center of the district is its capital Aghstafa. The district is located in the northwestern part of the country, between Qabirri basin and Lesser Caucasus mountain range, and Ganja-Gazakh lowlands and Ceyrançöl highlands. It is sandwiched by Qazakh District in the west and Tovuz District in east, and borders Armenia on the southern frontier and Georgia on the northern. The area of the district is 1,503.7 km^{2}. There are 36 villages in the district. There are 39 secondary schools, lyceum, musical school, 2 museums, 38 cultural clubs, State Arts Gallery, 49 libraries, 3 city and 10 village hospitals functioning in the district. Ganja, Qazakh and Qarayazi lowlands make up most of the district's area, whilst its southwestern and northeastern parts comprise lesser mountain sites.

=== Etymology ===
The region is named after the Aghstafa river, the hydronym of which comes from ağsu ("drinking water") + tafa ("daf"), meaning "noisy river".

According to various folk etymologies, the area's name comes from the name of the Oghuz Turks, which include mainly the population of Azerbaijan, Turkey and Turkmenistan. Per these folk etymologies, Ağstafa is either a merger of Oğuz + tayfa (Oghuz + tribe) or Oğuz + təpə (Oghuz + hill).

== Economy ==
The region is rich with bentonite, sand, raw cement material (volcanic ash) and other resources which are considered a core of the Aghstafa economy. The Kura River passes through the region. Lower sections of Aghstafa and Həsənsu rivers also flow through the district. Aghstafa has always been in the spotlight because of the historic Silk Way trade which went through the region. Caravans from and to Georgia and Iran would stop in Aghstafa. It was therefore named the "Camel route". In the 1990s, the caravan route was re-established within the TRACECA project initiated by Heydar Aliyev administration. Then Aghstafa gained importance when it became a transit route on the Baku-Tbilisi railroad built in 1881. A railroad junction at Aghstafa was built in 1914 thus creating leading to construction of Aghstafa city. In addition to the existing railway, the geostrategic importance of Aghstafa was enriched by Baku-Gazakh-Tbilisi gas pipeline, Baku–Tbilisi–Ceyhan pipeline, Baku-Tbilisi-Erzurum gas pipeline.

During the first nine months of 2013, the cost of total product output in Aghstafa region was AZN 90.9 million, an increase of 8.0 percent in comparison with the same period last year. During the first nine months of 2017, total volume of total product output on the region of Aghstafa increased by 43.6 percent and reached 143.7 million manat. The total volume of industrial production increased by 38.3 percent, agriculture - by 0.9 percent, transport services - 3.3 percent, communication services - 4.3 percent, trade - 0.4 percent and construction - three times in comparison with the same period last year. The volume of investments directed to fixed assets increased 2.7 times and amounted to more than 68.7 million manat.

== Demography ==
The population of Aghstafa district is 78,983. The most populated villages are Dağ Kəsəmən, Köçəsgər, Muğanlı and Aşağı Kəsəmən and the town of Aghstafa.

- Azerbaijanis - 98.7%
- Meskhetian Turks - 0.6%
- Other - 0.7%

=== Population ===
The territory of Aghstafa district is 1,504 km^{2}, with a population of 83.3 thousand people registered in January 2013. According to the information on January 1, 2017, the population of the district was 86,529, of which 21,205 lived in the city and 65,324 lived in the villages.

The population of the region is 42,651 men and 43,878 women.

The number of people currently employed are 43,481. The number of employees working in the agricultural sector are 17,856 people, employees working in the industry are 330 people, employees working in the education field are 3,726.

Seventy-seven families (223 people) from Nagorno-Karabakh and other territories temporarily settled in Aghstafa region. The total number of refugees settled in the region are 457 families, 1,698 people.

According to the State Statistics Committee, the population of city recorded 87,200 persons as of 2018, which increased by 12,700 persons (approximately 17 percent) from 74,500 persons in 2000. Of the total population, 43,000 are men and 44,200 are women. More than 26.4 percent of the population (about 23,100 persons) consists of young people and teenagers aged 14–29.

The population of the district by the year (at the beginning of the year, thsd. persons)
Territory	2000	2001	2002	2003	2004	2005	2006	2007	2008	2009	2010	2011	2012	2013	2014	2015	2016	2017	2018	2019	2020	2021
Aghstafa region	74,5	75,1	75,5	76,0	76,6	77,3	78,0	78,6	79,3	80,2	80,6	81,4	81,9	82,7	83,6	84,6	85,7	86,6	87,2	87,9	88,5	88,8
urban population	14,7	14,8	14,9	15,0	19,7	19,9	20,1	20,1	20,0	20,2	20,2	20,2	20,3	20,4	20,6	20,8	21,0	21,2	21,3	21,4	21,6	21,6
rural population	59,8	60,3	60,6	61,0	56,9	57,4	57,9	58,5	59,3	60,0	60,4	61,2	61,6	62,3	63,0	63,8	64,7	65,4	65,9	66,5	66,9	67,2

== Education ==
There are 39 libraries, 13 culture houses, a musical school, 3 museums, a painting gallery and 25 clubs in the region. A Central Hospital, a rural hospital, and 15 rural health posts serve the population of the district.

There are 39 schools, 4 preschools and 34 kindergartens in the district.

== Geographical position ==
Aghstafa district was established on January 24, 1939, as one of the administrative districts of Azerbaijan. The Area of Aghstafa district, which is 1.74 of the territory of the Republic, is 1,504 km². The territory of the Aghstafa district joined the Gazakh district on December 4, 1959, and it was separated and became an administrative district from April 14, 1990.

There is one town (Aghstafa town), nine settlements (Vurgun, Poylu, Shakarli, Jeyranchol, Saloglu, Soyuqbulag, Soyuqbulaglar, Hazi Aslanov, Garajazi) and twenty-nine villages in the district.

The administrative center of the district is Aghstafa. The status of the city was given to Aghstafa in 1941. According to the 2017's information, the population of the city where located 300 meters above sea level on the right bank of Aghstafa River, is 86,529 people. The distance from Baku is 450 km.

Forested areas account for 3,510 hectares of the district's territory. The main part of the forests is Tugai forest. Covering a territory of 3,510 hectares, a number of plants and birds are protected in the Garayazi State Reserve, the names of which are listed in the IUCN Red List.

The region is located in the western part of Azerbaijan, on the border with Georgia and Armenia. The Kur River, the largest river in Azerbaijan, and the Kura branch - Aghstafachay, as well as several small rivers flow from this region. Candargol Lake is also located in this region. The surface of the district mainly consists of plain such as Ganja-Gazakh and Garayazi plains. Sediments belonging to the Cretaceous, Paleogene, Quaternary are spread in the region. There are minerals such as saw stone, bentonite clay, pebble, sand, cement raw material, etc.

== Tourism and historical monuments ==
=== Prehistoric monuments ===
- Paleolithic tent settlement(Paleolithic)- village Kochesker
- Open Palaeolithic tent(Paleolithic)- village Tatli
- Toyratepe settlement(neolith(late Stone Age)-Bronze Age)-village Ashagi Goychali
- 1st Shomutepe settlement (neolith)-Aghstafa city
- Gargalar hill settlement (neolith)-village Girili
- Arzamastepe settlement (neolith)-settlement Vurgun
- Molla Nagi hill (Stone Age-neolith)-village Kochesker
- Kichik tepe settlement (Stone Age, neolith and Bronze Age)-village Ashagi Goyjali
- Chapiish settlement (eneolith-Bronze Age)-surrounding of Hasangulu river
- Chinlitepe settlement (eneolith)-village Tatli
- Ancient settlement and graveyard (choban dashi)(Bronze Age-Early Iron Age)-village Dagkesemen
- Jantepe settlement (Bronze Age)-Aghstafa city
- Sari gaznag graveyard (Bronze Age)- village Kochesker
- Alchagtepe settlement (Bronze Age-Iron Age)-village Tatli
- Alchagtepe settlement (Bronze Age)-village Tatli
- Gabagtepe settlement (Bronze Age-Iron Age)- village Pirili
- Yastitepe settlement (late Bronze Age)- Aghstafa city
- Durnatepe settlement (late Bronze Age-early Iron Age)- village Kochesker
- Boyuktepe settlement (Böyük Kəsik) (late Bronze Age-early Iron Age)- village Kochesker
- Hasarlitepe settlement (late Bronze Age-early Iron Age)-village Yukhari Goyjali
- Saritepe settlement (late Bronze Age-early Iron Age)- village Yukhari Goyjali
- Goshatepe settlement (late Bronze Age-Iron Age)-village Yukhari Goyjali
- Hasarligala ancient settlement (late Bronze Age-Iron Age)-village Tatli
- 2nd Shomutepe settlement (Bronze Age-early Iron Age)- village Yukhari Goyjali
- Nadir bey hill settlement (late Bronze Age)-village Hasansu
- Agalig tepesi settlement (late Bronze Age-early Iron Age)- Aghstafa-Gazakh highway
- Aranchi hill settlement (late Bronze Age- Iron Age)- Aghstafa-Dagkesemen highway
- Deyirmantepe settlement (late Bronze Age- early Middle Age)- Dagkesemen highway
- Agtepe settlement (late Bronze Age-antic period)- village Ashagi Goyjali
- Maraltepe settlement (late Bronze Age-antic period)- village Ashagi Goyjali
- Shish Guzey sacred place (Iron Age)- village Kochesker

=== Ancient to modern monuments ===
Several important archaeological sites in Aghstafa District belong to the prehistoric Shulaveri–Shomu culture. Among them are Soyuqbulaq, Agstafa, Poylu, Agstafa, and Böyük Kəsik. Also should be included here Toyra Tepe and Gargalar sites. Research in this area emerged especially in the 21st century. Shomu-Tepe, the type site of the Shulaveri–Shomu culture, is also located in the Agstafa District.

Other ancient archaeological sites in the area include:

- The David Gareja monastery complex (Keşiş Dağ in Azerbaijani) is partially located in this region. However, access is on unpaved roads and, because the site is subject to a border dispute between Georgian and Azerbaijani authorities, visitors are treated with considerable suspicion.
- Nekropol (antic period)-village Pirili
- Tatli Albanian temple (early Middle Ages)-between the villages Yukhari Goychali and Tatli
- Construction forked mountain air(middle age)- village Kochesker
- Settlement (4th-7th centuries)-village Dagkesemen
- Underground water-supply system(19th century)-village Kolkhalafli.

== Notable natives ==
- Sabir Azeri (1938-2010) - Writer, author of best selling books.
- Aslan Aslanov (1926–1995) - Doctor of philosophical sciences, the real member of the NA of the Republic of Azerbaijan, deserved scientific figure, rector of Azerbaijan State University of Arts (1977), the vice-president of the Azerbaijan Academy of Sciences and director of the Institute of Philosophy and Law(1988–1995).
- Baba Mirzayev (1940-2006) - The National artist of the Azerbaijan Republic
- Bayram Bayramov (1935) - Candidate of technical sciences, owner of the order of "Glory", pensioner by the President, deserved rationalizer of Azerbaijan, the deputy of the chairman of Oil and Gas Extraction Office "Neft Dashlari" (from 1987).
- Huseyn Arif (1924-1992) - poet
- Ibrahim Rahimov (1849–1927) - The first psychiatrist-doctor of Azerbaijan.
- Ilyas Abdullayev (1913) the academician of NA of Azerbaijan SSR, the deputy of the chairman of the Council of the Ministers of Azerbaijan SSR (1948–1950), Minister of Agriculture (1950–1953), the first deputy of the chairman of the Council of the Ministers (1954–1958), the chairman of Presidium of the Supreme Council of Azerbaijan SSR (1958–1959), the deputy of the Supreme Councils of USSR and Azerbaijan SSR.
- Isa Huseynov (1928) - writer
- Museyib Allahverdiyev (1909–1969)- Hero of the Soviet Union(1945), commander of detachment.
- Nariman Hasanzade (1931) - poet
- Nizami Jafarov (1954) - philologist
- Nusrat Kasamanli (1946-2003) - poet
- Samed aga Agamalioglu (1867–1930)-famous revolutionary, the first deputy of Azerbaijan CEC (1921), the chairman of CEC of Azerbaijan SSR, one of the chairmen of CEC of TSFSR (1922–1929), the chairman of the committee of All-Union New Turkish alphabet.
- Suleyman Tatliyev (1925)-the chief of the department of the affairs at the Council of the Ministers (1970–1978), the 1st deputy of the chairman of the Council of the Ministers (1978–1985), the chairman of the Presidium of the Supreme Council of the Republic (1985–1989), the president of the House of Commerce and Industry of the Republic of Azerbaijan (from 1994), deputy of the Supreme Council of Azerbaijan SSR.
- Vidadi Babanli (1927) - writer
