= Animated mapping =

Application of animation to add a temporal component to a map displaying change

Animated mapping is the application of animation, either a computer or video, to add a temporal component to a map displaying change in some dimension. Most commonly the change is shown over time, generally at a greatly changed scale (either much faster than real-time or much slower).

Animation of the 2004 Indonesian tsunami

== History ==
The concept of animated maps began in the 1930s but did not become more developed by cartographers until the 1950s. In 1959, Norman Thrower published Animated Cartography, discussing the use of animated maps in adding a new dimension that was difficult to express in static maps: time. These early maps were created by drawing "snap-shots" of static maps, putting a series of maps together to form a scene, and creating animation through photography tricks (Thrower 1959). Such early maps rarely had an associated scale, legends or oriented themselves to lines of longitude or latitude.

With the development of computers in the 1960s and 1970s, animation programs were developed allowing the growth of animation in mapping. Waldo Tobler created one of the first computer-generated map animations, using a 3-D computer-generated map to portray population growth over a specified time in Detroit. Hal Moellering created another animated map in 1976 representing a spatiotemporal pattern in traffic accidents.

Further development in animated maps was stalled until the 1990s due to a lack of animation in academics, financial restrictions on research, and a lack of distribution means. In the 1990s, however, the invention of faster, more efficient computers, compact discs, and the Internet solved such problems. Today, there are many free options for hosting animated maps online, including YouTube and GitHub. Internet GIS and web mapping both make extensive use of animated maps, particularly when showing time. Because of the nature of the Internet, this may lead to the distribution of misinformation and contribute to the infodemic.

== Visual variables ==
With the growth of animated mapping came the development of guidelines for creating animated maps. Visual variables such as spacing, lightness, and shape used for static maps apply. However, in 1991, David DiBiase and colleagues developed visual variables unique to animated maps: duration, rate of change, and order. Duration is the unit of time a frame or scene is displayed, affecting the smoothness of the animation. The shorter a frame is displayed, the smoother the animation will appear. Smoothness of animation is also a function of the rate of change. Order refers to the time sequence in which animation is played out, usually presented in chronological sequence. Alan MacEachren extended these visual variables in 1995 to include display date (time at which change is initiated), frequency (number of times identifiable forms are displayed), and synchronization (correspondence of 2 or more time series).

== Types ==
Animated maps can emphasize the existence of an occurrence at a location, emphasize an attribute of an occurrence, or represent a change in the position or attributes of an occurrence. For instance, a flashing symbol may be used to draw the map-reader's attention to a particular occurrence at one location or multiple locations across the map. Maps on the weather channel use animation to emphasize the current and predicted paths of hurricanes.

The use of the Internet has allowed animated maps to become interactive. By seamlessly combining multiple projector images into a complete image. The user can witness representations of changes over time, while manipulating the direction of view, the pace or the parameters of the map displayed.

Animation on maps can be mainly divided into two types: temporal and non-temporal.

=== Temporal map animation ===
Animated dot density map of COVID-19 cases in Connecticut between March 21, 2020 and May 21, 2020

Temporal map animation shows the ongoing gradual changes over time. Temporal maps can also be termed animated timeline maps and can be a useful reference to examine the changes ongoing on each step and analyze the progression occurring gradually as time passes.

There are many purposes which temporal animation might serve to depict: displaying and analyzing geographic patterns, meteorological events, climate, natural disasters, and other multivariate data.

==== Animated mapping of history ====
Animated mapping is extensively used in the construction of animated maps to depict historical events in a cartographic environment, particularly in the subdiscipline of Historical geographic information system. These were one of the first applications of such maps, documented in Waldo Tobler's 1970 paper. Today, such animations often show the land ownership/occupation of specific groups over time.

=== Importance of legend in temporal maps ===
As in the case of static maps, it would be useful if temporal maps could also be provided with proper legend. Legends for temporal maps should not only tell the time but also let users travel over time. Various manipulations such as traveling to a certain point in time, selecting focus level, etc. should be allowed to enhance user-friendliness.

Using legend in the temporal map will answer important questions related to the entity's existence (if?), the entity's location (when?), time intervals (how long?), temporal texture (how often), the speed at which change takes place (how fast?), and the order of change (what order?).

Depending upon their construction, animated legends may distract the viewer from the animated map. Care must be taken to integrate the legend unobtrusively.

=== Non-temporal map animation ===
Non-temporal map animation shows changes against some other variable other than time. The variable might be a place, position, generalization level, etc. Non–temporal animation also serves when there is a need to show both the data set and the transformation that has been applied to it for its display.

Non-temporal animation can be of many types according to the purpose they serve:

Fly through animation
This type of animation gives the viewer the feeling of flying through the landscape.

Cartographic zoom animation
This type of animation shows maps at different focus levels and viewers can change the scale of the map as desired.

Classification animation
Different methods of data classification are depicted in this animation.

Generalization animation
This type of animation uses a single classification method with multiple classes of data.

Time is an important aspect in both animations. Real-time is depicted in temporal animation and presentation time (time to show the animation) is associated with non-temporal animation.

== See also ==
- Cartography – Study and practice of making maps
- Fantasy cartography – Study and creation of maps of imagined places or events
- Geovisualization – Visualization of geospatial data
- Geographic information system – System to capture, manage, and present geographic data (GIS)
- Geocode – Code that represents a geographic entity (location or object)
- List of cartographers
- Map projection – Systematic representation of the surface of a sphere or ellipsoid onto a plane
- Pictorial map – Map that uses pictures to represent features
- TimeMap – Open-source web mapping application
- Time geography
