= Annexation =

Concept in political science

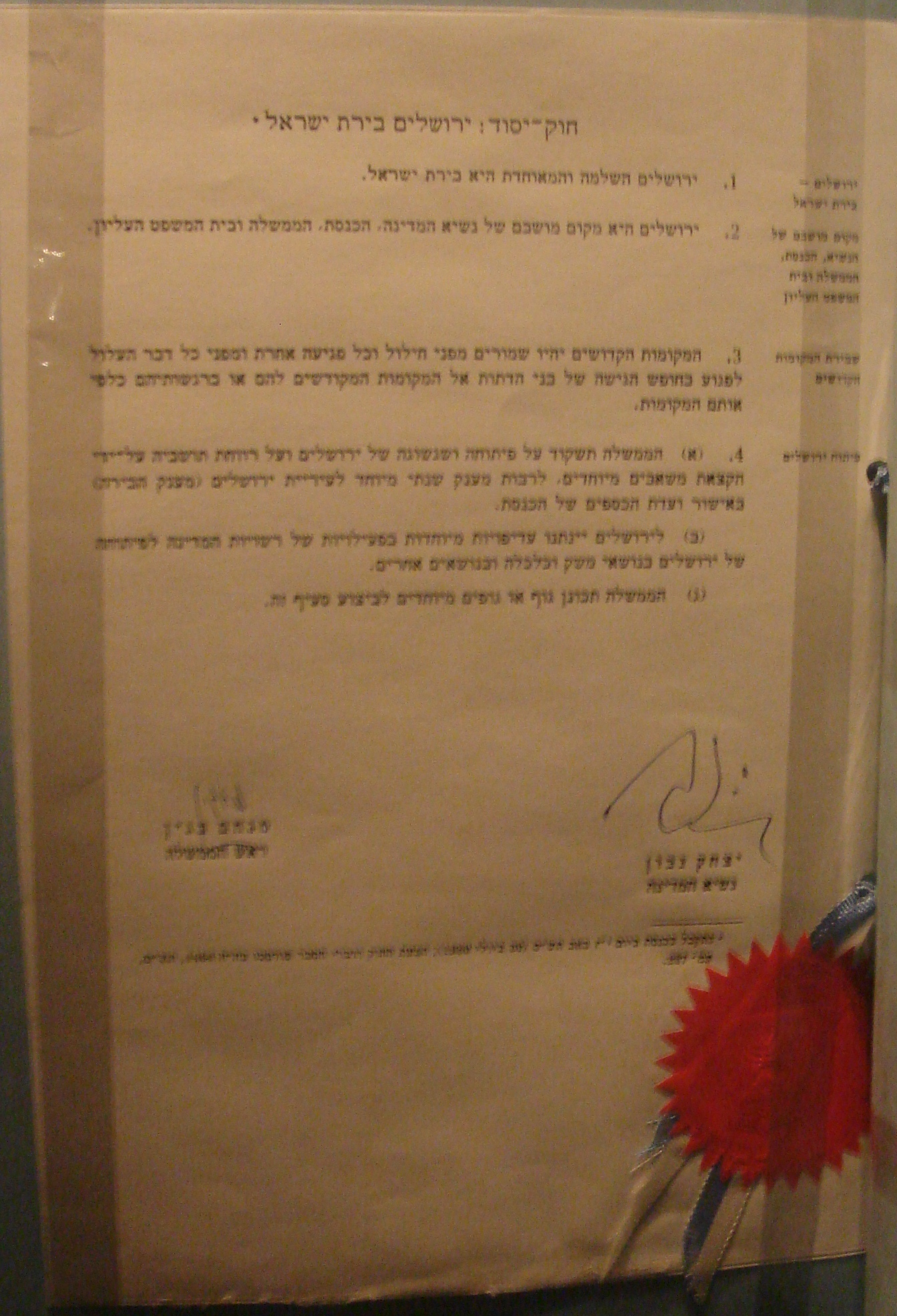
Basic Law: Jerusalem, Capital of Israel, passed by the Knesset on 30 July 1980

Federal Law Admitting to the Russian Federation the Republic of Crimea, passed by the State Duma on 21 March 2014

Two examples of unilateral annexation laws, illegal under international law

Annexation, in international law, is the forcible acquisition and assertion of legal title over one state's territory by another state, usually following military occupation of the territory. In current international law, it is generally held to be an illegal act. It is distinct from the concepts of conquest, (Note: Scholars have debated the existence of a norm against conquest since 1945 but states have continued to pursue annexation of smaller swaths of territory.) which describes the gaining of physical control, and cession, in which territory is given or sold through treaty.

Annexation can be legitimized if generally recognized by other states and international bodies.

The illegality of annexation means that states carrying out such acts usually avoid using the word annexation in describing their actions; in each of the unresolved annexations by Israel, Morocco and Russia, the states have avoided characterizing their actions as such.

== Evolution of international law ==
=== Illegality ===
International law regarding the use of force by states evolved significantly in the 20th century. Key agreements include the 1907 Porter Convention, the 1920 Covenant of the League of Nations and the 1928 Kellogg–Briand Pact, (Note: It is generally held that countries are under obligation to abide by the Stimson Doctrine that a state: "cannot admit the legality of any situation de facto nor... recognize any treaty or agreement entered into between those Governments... not... recognize any situation, treaty or agreement which may be brought about by means contrary to the covenants and obligations of the Pact of Paris of August 27, 1928".) culminating in Article 2(4) of Chapter I of the United Nations Charter, which is in force today: "All Members shall refrain in their international relations from the threat or use of force against the territorial integrity or political independence of any state, or in any other manner inconsistent with the Purposes of the United Nations".

These principles were reconfirmed by the 1970 Friendly Relations Declaration. Since the use of force against territorial integrity or political independence is illegal, the question as to whether title or sovereignty can be transferred in such a situation has been the subject of legal debate. '[A]nnexation by the use of force of the territory of another State or part thereof' is an act of aggression according to the Rome Statute of the International Criminal Court.

=== Occupation and annexation ===
Illegally annexed territory is considered as still occupied under international law and the provisions of international humanitarian law continue to apply. For precision, such territory may be referred to as "occupied and illegally annexed". In a report to the United Nations General Assembly, Michael Lynk contrasted de jure annexation as a formal declaration by a state that it is claiming permanent sovereignty over territory and de facto annexation without the formal declaration as a descriptive term for a state establishing facts on the ground as the prelude to a future claim of sovereignty.

The Fourth Geneva Convention (GCIV) of 1949 amplified the Hague Conventions of 1899 and 1907 with respect to the question of the protection of civilians, and the rules regarding inviolability of rights have "an absolute character", making it much more difficult for a state to bypass international law through the use of annexation. (Note: GCIV Article 47, in the first paragraph in Section III: Occupied territories, restricted the effects of annexation on the rights of persons within those territories: "Protected persons who are in occupied territory shall not be deprived, in any case or in any manner whatsoever, of the benefits of the present Convention by any change introduced, as the result of the occupation of a territory, into the institutions or government of the said territory, nor by any agreement concluded between the authorities of the occupied territories and the Occupying Power, nor by any annexation by the latter of the whole or part of the occupied territory.")

== Annexations since the founding of the United Nations ==
=== Unresolved ===
==== Israeli annexations ====
Israel and the territories Israel occupied in the Six-Day War.

===== East Jerusalem =====
During the 1967 Six-Day War, Israel captured East Jerusalem, a part of the West Bank, from Jordan. While Jordan had annexed the West Bank in 1950, it was considered an illegal occupation and Jordan was recognized as the legal sovereign by the United Kingdom and possibly Pakistan. On 31 July 1988, Jordan relinquished this claim. It has remained occupied until the present day. On 27 June 1967, Israel unilaterally extended its law and jurisdiction to East Jerusalem and some of the surrounding area, incorporating about 70 square kilometers of territory into the Jerusalem Municipality. Although at the time, Israel informed the United Nations that its measures constituted administrative and municipal integration rather than annexation, later rulings by the Israeli Supreme Court indicated that East Jerusalem had become part of Israel. In 1980, Israel passed the Jerusalem Law as part of its Basic Law, which declared Jerusalem the "complete and united" capital of Israel. In other words, Israel purported to annex East Jerusalem. The annexation was declared null and void by United Nations Security Council (UNSC) resolutions 252, 267, 271, 298, 465, 476 and 478.

Jewish neighborhoods have since been built in East Jerusalem, and Israeli Jews have since also settled in Arab neighborhoods there, though some Jews may have returned from their 1948 expulsion after the Battle for Jerusalem. Only Costa Rica recognized Israel's annexation of East Jerusalem, and those countries who maintained embassies in Israel did not move them to Jerusalem. The United States Congress passed the Jerusalem Embassy Act, which recognizes Jerusalem as the united capital of Israel and requires the relocation of the U.S. embassy there in 1995. The act included a provision permitting the president to delay its implementation due to national security concerns. This waiver was used by presidents Clinton, Bush, Obama, and Trump, but was allowed to expire in 2019.

===== West Bank excluding East Jerusalem =====
Law professor Omar M. Dajani and others discuss de facto annexation (also referred to as "creeping annexation"). The debate considers whether, in all the circumstances, there is a pattern of behavior sufficient to conclude that Israel is in violation of the international prohibition against annexation, even absent a formal declaration.

===== Golan Heights =====
Israel occupied two-thirds of the Golan Heights from Syria during the 1967 Six-Day War, and subsequently built Jewish settlements in the area. In 1981, Israel passed the Golan Heights Law, which extended Israeli "law, jurisdiction, and administration" to the area, including the Shebaa farms area. This declaration was declared "null and void and without international legal effect" by United Nations Security Council Resolution 497. The Federated States of Micronesia recognized the annexation and in 2019, the United States joined in recognition.

The vast majority of Syrian Druze in Majdal Shams, the largest Syrian village in the Golan, have held onto their Syrian passports. When Israel annexed the Golan Heights in 1981, 95% of the Majdal Shams residents refused Israeli citizenship, and are still firmly of that opinion, in spite of the Syrian Civil War.

On 29 November 2012, the United Nations General Assembly reaffirmed it was "[d]eeply concerned that Israel has not withdrawn from the Syrian Golan, which has been under occupation since 1967, contrary to the relevant Security Council and General Assembly resolutions," and "[s]tress[ed] the illegality of the Israeli settlement construction and other activities in the occupied Syrian Golan since 1967." The General Assembly then voted by majority, 110 in favour to 6 against (Canada, Israel, Marshall Islands, Federated States of Micronesia, Palau, United States), with 59 abstentions, to demand a full Israeli withdrawal from the Syrian Golan Heights.

On 25 March 2019, the United States recognized the Golan Heights as sovereign Israeli territory. In response, United Nations Secretary-General António Guterres stated "the status of Golan has not changed", and the decision received worldwide condemnation with European members of the United Nations Security Council noting "we raise our strong concerns about the broader consequences of recognizing illegal annexation and also about broader regional consequences" and that "annexation of territory by force is prohibited under international law", adding that unilateral changes to borders violate "the rules-based international order and the UN Charter".

==== Moroccan annexation of Western Sahara ====
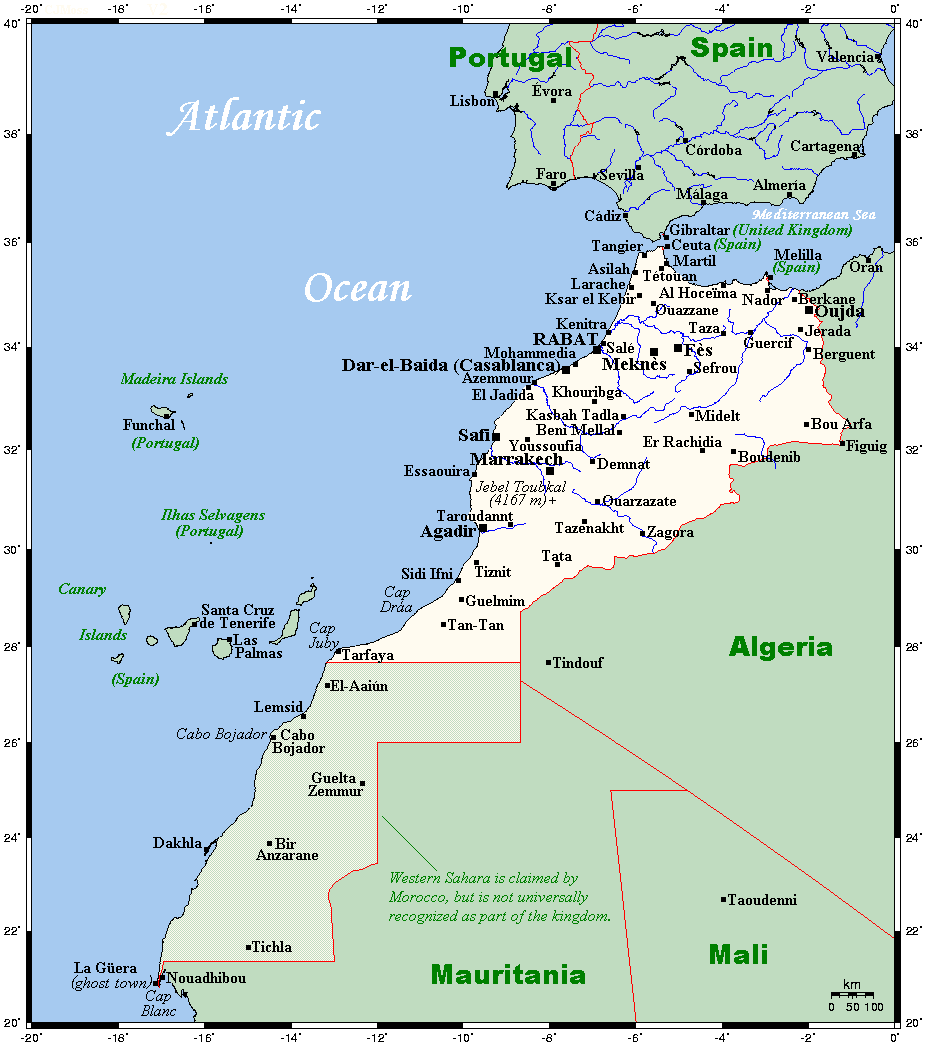
Morocco officially annexed Western Sahara in 1976

The annexation of Western Sahara occurred in two stages: 1976 and 1979.

In 1975, and following the Madrid Accords between Mauritania, Morocco, and Spain, the last Spanish troops withdrew from the territory and ceded the administration to Mauritania and Morocco. On 14 April 1976, the two countries annexed it between themselves via the Western Sahara partition agreement. This was challenged by an independentist movement, the Polisario Front that waged a guerrilla war against both Mauritania and Morocco. On 14 August 1979, after a military putsch, Mauritania renounced all territorial claims to Western Sahara and withdrew its troops. This prompted Morocco to extend its annexation to formerly Mauritanian-controlled areas.

A United Nations peace process was initiated in 1991, but it has been stalled, and as of mid-2012, the UN is holding direct negotiations between Morocco and the Polisario front to reach a solution to the conflict. The Sahrawi Arab Democratic Republic is a partially recognized state that has claimed the entire region since 1976.

==== Russian annexations ====
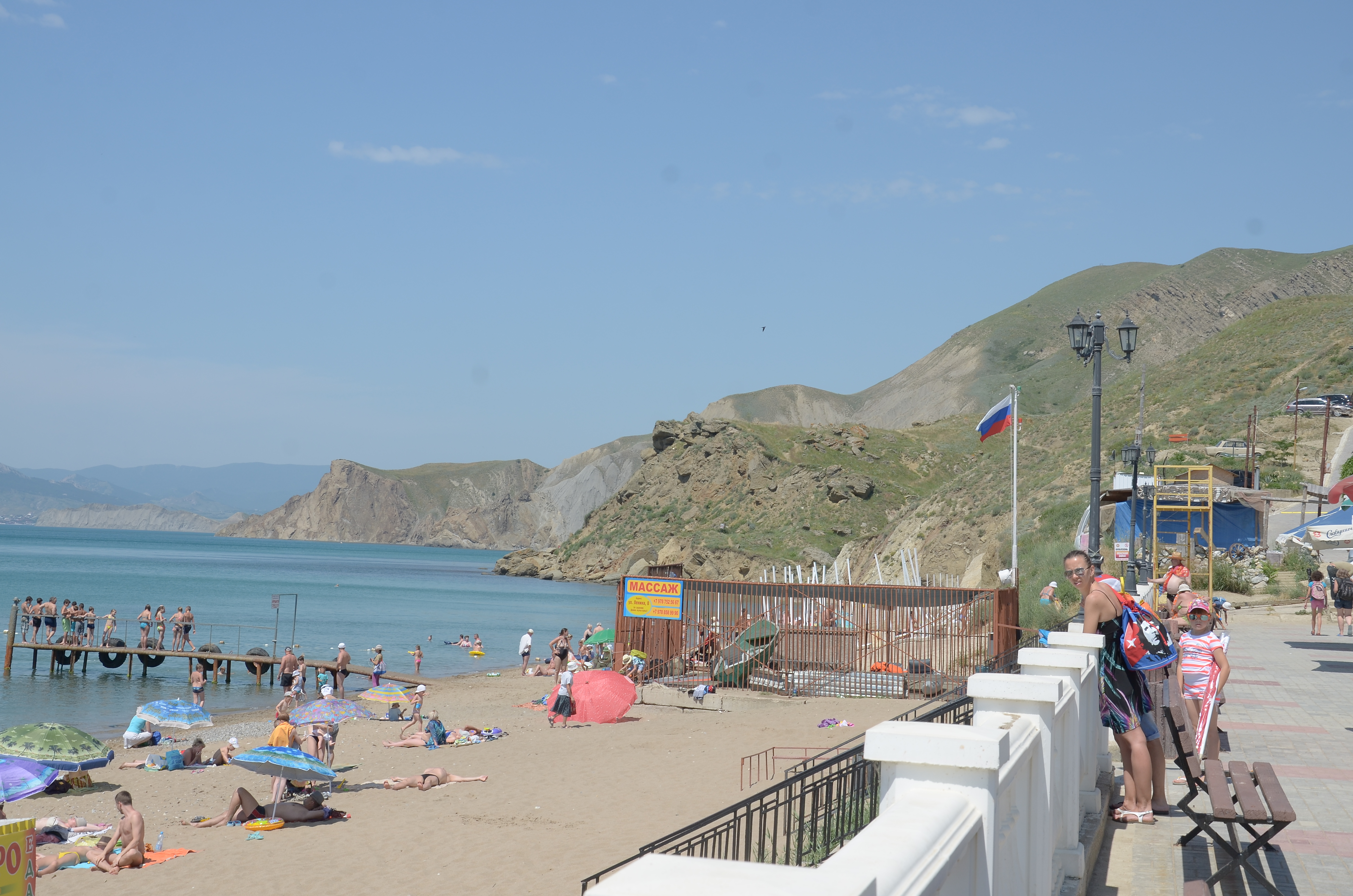
Tourists in Crimea with the Russian flag flying after annexation by Russia (14 June 2015)

In March 2014, Russia annexed the Crimean Peninsula, which had been a part of Ukraine since 1991 and administers the territory as two federal subjects – the Republic of Crimea and the federal city of Sevastopol. The UN General Assembly considers the Russian possession of Crimea and Sevastopol to be an "attempted annexation" and the Russian Federation an "occupying power".

Russia rejects the view that this was an annexation and regards it as an accession to the Russian Federation of a state that had just declared independence from Ukraine following a disputed referendum, and considers it secession as a result of irredentism. A term often used in Russia to describe these events is "re-unification" (воссоединение) to highlight the fact that Crimea was a part of the Russian Empire from 1783 to 1917, and part of the Russian SFSR from 1921 to 1954. Few states recognize this view. Ukraine considers Crimea and Sevastopol its own territory, and oversees the Crimea Platform, an international diplomatic initiative to restore its sovereignty.

Regions of Ukraine annexed by Russia, with a red line marking the area of actual control by Russia on 30 September 2022

In September 2022, during the Russo-Ukrainian war, the Russian Federation, following referendums, declared the annexation of territories in southern and eastern Ukraine. As a result, Russia claimed sovereignty over the territories of five Ukrainian oblasts – Luhansk, Donetsk, Zaporizhzhia, Kherson and Mykolaiv – and recognised as its federal subjects Donetsk People's Republic, Luhansk People's Republic, Zaporizhzhia and Kherson Oblasts.

=== Subsequently withdrawn ===
==== Ethiopian annexation of Eritrea ====
In 1952, Ethiopian Emperor Haile Selassie orchestrated a federation with Eritrea. He dissolved it in 1962 and annexed Eritrea, resulting in the Eritrean War of Independence.

==== Mauritanian annexation of the southern third of Western Sahara ====
In 1979, Mauritania abandoned its claim to the southern third of Western Sahara, disestablishing the short-lived province of Western Tiris.

==== Jordanian annexation of the West Bank ====
The part of former Mandatory Palestine occupied by Jordan during the 1948 Arab–Israeli War was renamed "the West Bank". It was annexed to Jordan in 1950 at the request of a Palestinian delegation. It had been questioned, however, how representative that delegation was, and at the insistence of the Arab League, Jordan was considered a trustee only. Only Pakistan and the United Kingdom recognized the annexation by Jordan. It was not condemned by the United Nations Security Council and it remained under Jordanian rule until 1967 when it was occupied by Israel. Jordan did not officially relinquish its claim to rule the West Bank until 1988. Israel has not taken the step of annexing the territory (except for the part of it that was made part of the Jerusalem Municipality). Rather, there were enacted a complex (and highly controversial) system of military government decrees in effect applying Israeli law in many spheres to Israeli settlements.

==== Indonesian annexation of East Timor ====
Indonesia annexed East Timor in 1976

Following an Indonesian invasion in 1975, East Timor (Timor-Leste) was annexed by Indonesia and was known as Timor Timur. It was regarded by Indonesia as the country's 27th province, but this was never recognised by the United Nations. The people of East Timor resisted Indonesian forces in a prolonged guerrilla campaign.

Following a referendum held in 1999 under a UN-sponsored agreement between the two sides, the people of East Timor rejected the offer of autonomy within Indonesia. East Timor achieved independence in 2002 and is now officially known as Timor-Leste.

==== Iraqi annexation of Kuwait ====
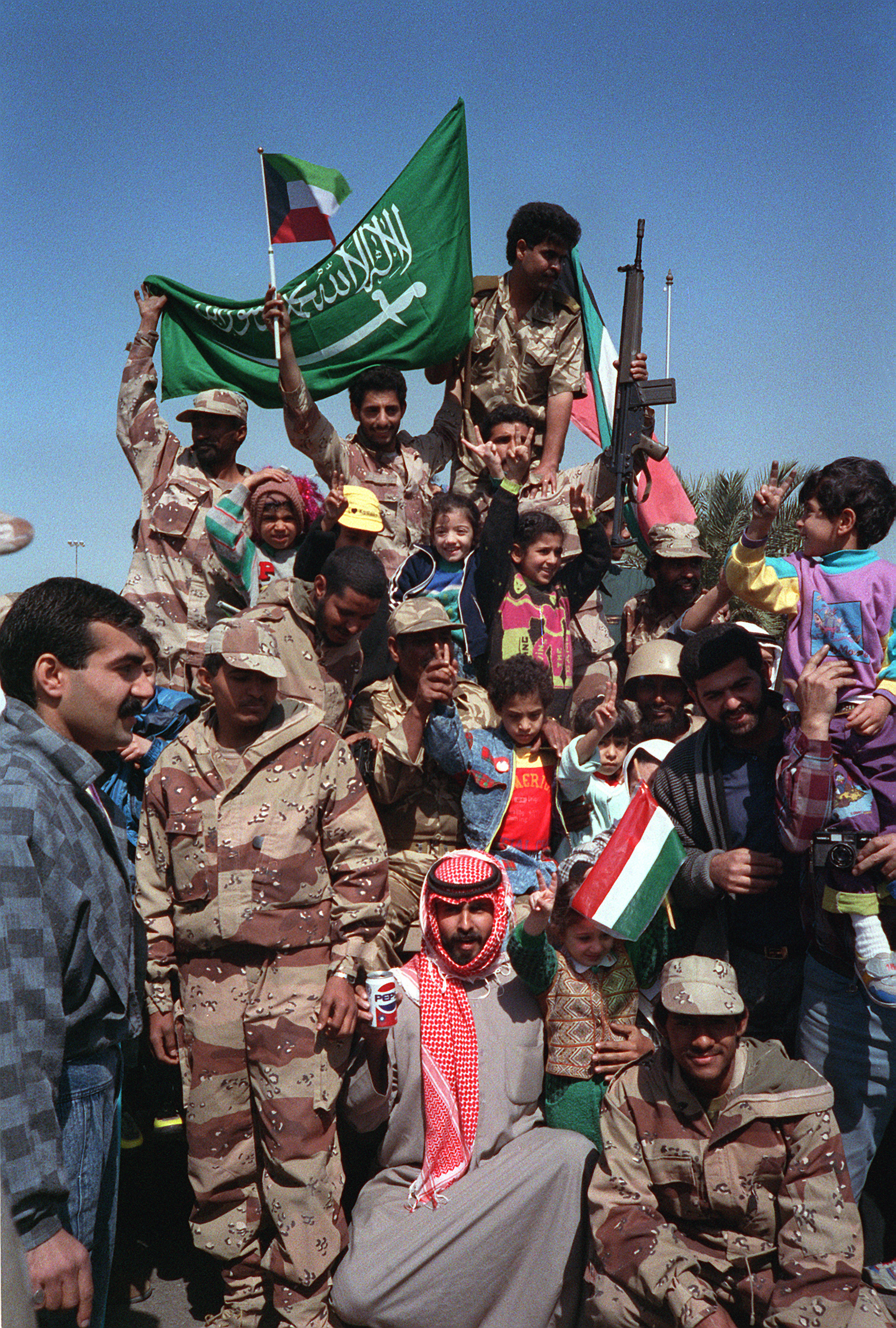
Civilians and coalition military forces wave Kuwaiti and Saudi Arabian flags as they celebrate the reversal of the annexation of Kuwait by Iraq (28 February 1991)

After being allied with Iraq during the Iran–Iraq War (largely due to desiring Iraqi protection from Iran), Kuwait was invaded and annexed by Iraq (under Saddam Hussein) in August 1990. Hussein's primary justifications included a charge that Kuwaiti territory was in fact an Iraqi province, and that annexation was retaliation for "economic warfare" Kuwait had waged through slant drilling into Iraq's oil supplies. The monarchy was deposed after annexation, and an Iraqi governor installed.

United States president George H. W. Bush ultimately condemned Iraq's actions, and moved to drive out Iraqi forces. Authorized by United Nations Security Council resolutions, an American-led coalition of 34 nations fought the Gulf War to reinstate the Kuwaiti Emir. Iraq's invasion (and annexation) was deemed illegal and Kuwait remains an independent nation today.

=== Subsequently legalized ===
==== Chinese annexation of Tibet ====
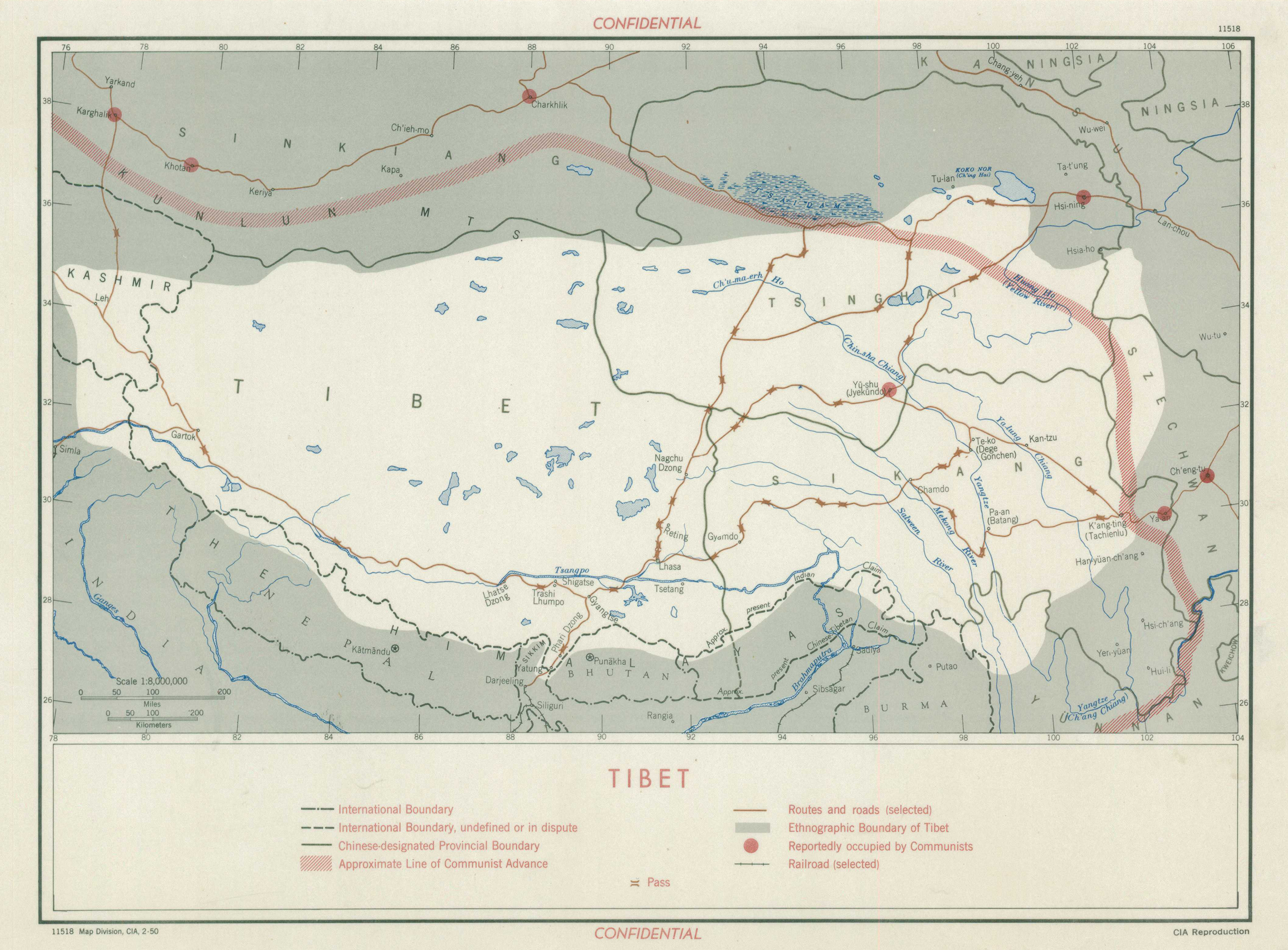
Tibet and approximate line of communist advance in February 1950

The rule of the Qing dynasty over Tibet was established after a Qing expedition force defeated the Dzungar Khanate which had occupied Tibet in 1720, and lasted until the fall of the Qing dynasty in 1912. The Imperial Edict of the Abdication of the Qing Emperor issued in 1912 provided the legal basis for the Republic of China (ROC) to inherit all Qing territories, including Tibet. However, the ROC had no effective control over Tibet from 1912 to 1951; In the opinion of the Chinese government, this condition does not represent Tibet's de jure independence as many other parts of China also enjoyed de facto independence when the Chinese state was torn by warlordism, Japanese invasion, and civil war.

Tibet came under the control of the People's Republic of China (PRC) after attempts by the Government of Tibet to gain international recognition, efforts to modernize its military, negotiations between the Government of Tibet and the PRC, and a military conflict in the Chamdo area of western Kham in October 1950. Many analysts consider the incorporation of Tibet into the PRC an annexation.

If the actions of 1950 constituted an annexation, it was subsequently legalized by the Seventeen Point Agreement by the Government of Tibet in October 1951. From 1959 onwards, claims were made that this agreement was signed under pressure; academics have debated this ever since, but Tibet is recognized internationally as part of China.

==== Indian annexations ====
===== Hyderabad =====
After the withdrawal of the British Empire from India, each of the Princely States of India and Pakistan that had been protectorates of the British Empire were given the choice of either 1. opting to join India, 2. opting to join Pakistan or 3. resume their former status as fully independent states. While most of the princely states opted to join either Pakistan or India, Hyderabad State elected instead to resume full independence. Following the expiration of ultimatums from India, the Indian military launched its Operation Polo on 13 September 1948 and invaded Hyderabad. After conquering most of Hyderabad in five days of warfare, the Nizam signed a treaty on 18 September 1948 that saw Hyderabad annexed by India.

===== Goa, Daman and Diu =====
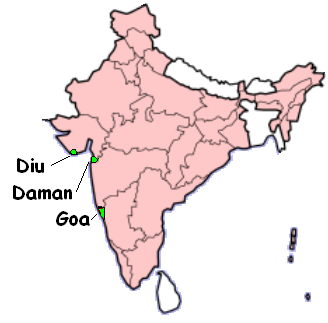
Portuguese India in 1961

In 1954, the residents of Dadra and Nagar Haveli, a Portuguese enclave within India, ended Portuguese rule with the help of nationalist volunteers. From 1954 to 1961, the territory enjoyed de facto independence. In 1961, the territory was merged with India after its government signed an agreement with the Indian government.

In 1961, India and Portugal engaged in a brief military conflict over Portuguese-controlled Goa and Daman and Diu. India invaded and conquered the areas after 36 hours of fighting, thus ending 451 years of Portuguese colonial rule in India. The action was viewed in India as a liberation of historically Indian territory; in Portugal, however, the loss of both enclaves was seen as a national tragedy. A condemnation of the action by the United Nations Security Council was vetoed by the Soviet Union. Goa and Daman and Diu were incorporated into India.

Portugal recognized India's sovereignty over Goa in a treaty in December 1974.

===== Sikkim =====
The strategic importance of Sikkim was realized in the 1960s during the Sino-Indian War. Map in Polish.

During the British colonial rule in India, Sikkim had an ambiguous status, as an Indian princely state or as an Indian protectorate. Prior to Indian independence, Jawaharlal Nehru, acting as the leader of Executive Council, agreed that Sikkim would not be treated as an Indian state. Between 1947 and 1950, Sikkim enjoyed de facto independence. However, Indian independence spurred popular political movements in Sikkim and the ruling Chogyal came under pressure. He requested Indian help to quell the uprising, which was offered. Subsequently, in 1950, India signed a treaty with Sikkim bringing it under its suzerainty, and controlling its external affairs, defence, diplomacy and communications. A state council was established in 1955 to allow for constitutional government under the Sikkimese monarch. Meanwhile, trouble was brewing in the state after the Sikkim National Congress demanded fresh elections and greater representation for the Nepalese. In the 1967 Nathu La and Cho La clashes, Chinese border attacks were repulsed. In 1973, riots in front of the palace led to a formal request for protection from India. The Chogyal was proving to be extremely unpopular with the people. In 1975, the Kazi (prime minister) appealed to the Indian Parliament for a change in Sikkim's status so that it could become a state of India. In April, the Indian Army moved into Sikkim, seizing the city of Gangtok and disarming the Palace Guards. A referendum was held in which 97.5% of the voting people (59% of the people entitled to vote) voted to join the Indian Union. A few weeks later, on 16 May 1975, Sikkim officially became the 22nd state of the Indian Union and the monarchy was abolished.

==== Indonesian annexation of Western New Guinea ====
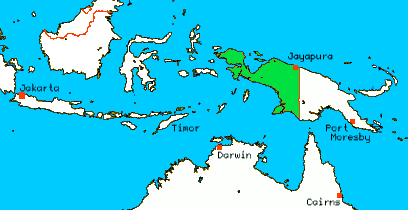
Western New Guinea officially became part of Indonesia in 1969

Western New Guinea officially became part of Indonesia through the Act of Free Choice in 1969, supervised by the UN. Based on the New York Agreement (1962) between Indonesia and the Netherlands, the UN held the Act of Free Choice to determine whether Western New Guinea would join Indonesia or not. Through a deliberation of representatives, the majority voted to join, and this result was accepted by the UN General Assembly in a session in November 1969. This decision was implicitly considered to recognize Western New Guinea as part of Indonesia, because the General Assembly did not reject the report of the UN Secretary General regarding the implementation of Act of Free Choice. West Papua is the western half of the island of New Guinea and smaller islands to its west. The separatist Free Papua Movement (OPM) has engaged in a small-scale yet bloody conflict with the Indonesian military since the 1960s.

==== North Vietnamese annexation of South Vietnam ====
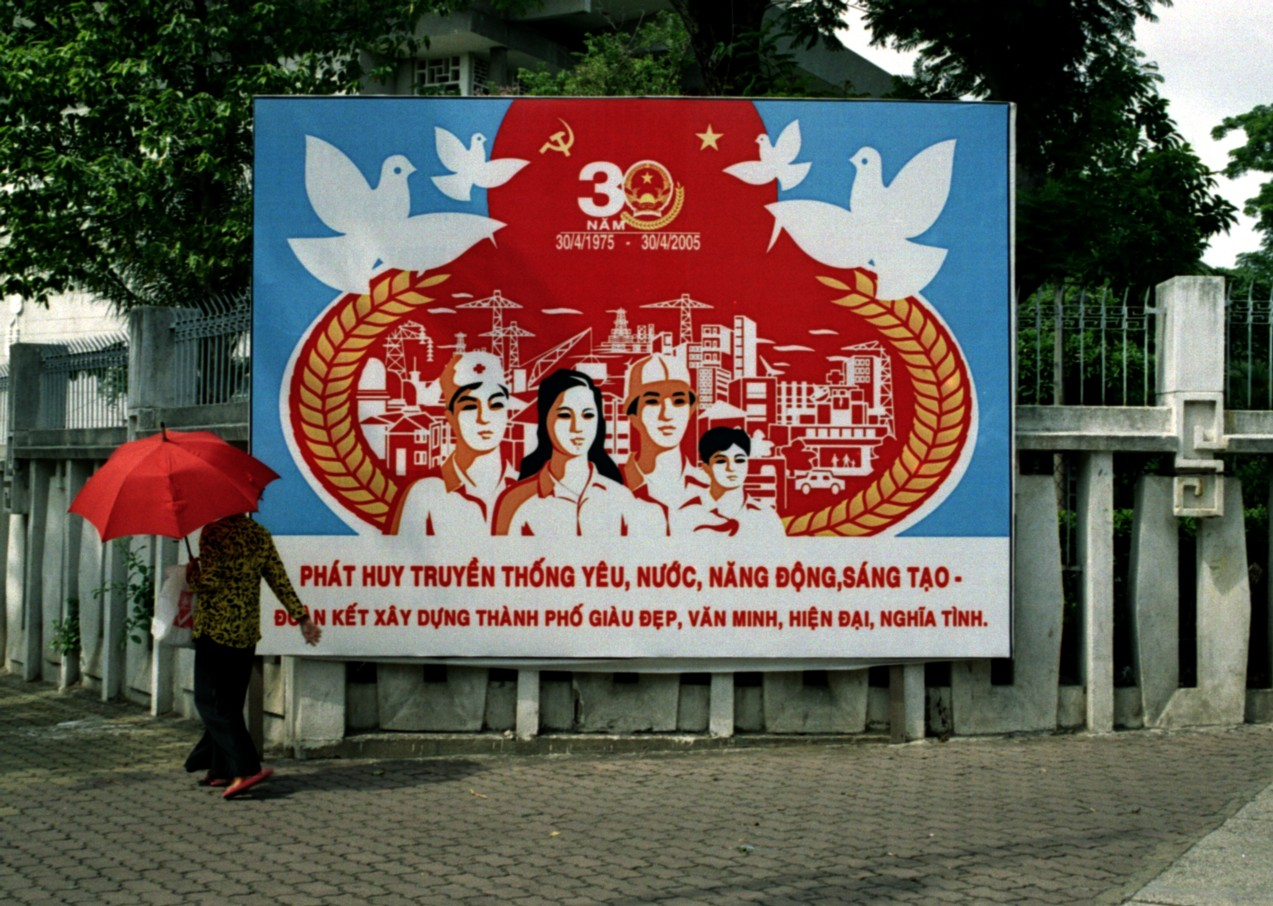
Communist Party of Vietnam billboard marking the 30th anniversary of the reunification of the country in 1975

North Vietnam de facto annexed South Vietnam following the military defeat and effective dissolution of its government system and military on 30 April 1975. Vietnam was officially reunited one year later as the merger of the Provisional Revolutionary Government of the Republic of South Vietnam and North Vietnam.

=== Other ===
==== Queen Maud Land ====
One example of a claimed annexation after World War II is the Kingdom of Norway's southward expansion of the dependent territory Queen Maud Land. On most maps, there had been an unclaimed area between Queen Maud Land's borders of 1939 and the South Pole until 12 June 2015, when Norway formally claimed to have annexed that area.

==== British annexation of Rockall ====
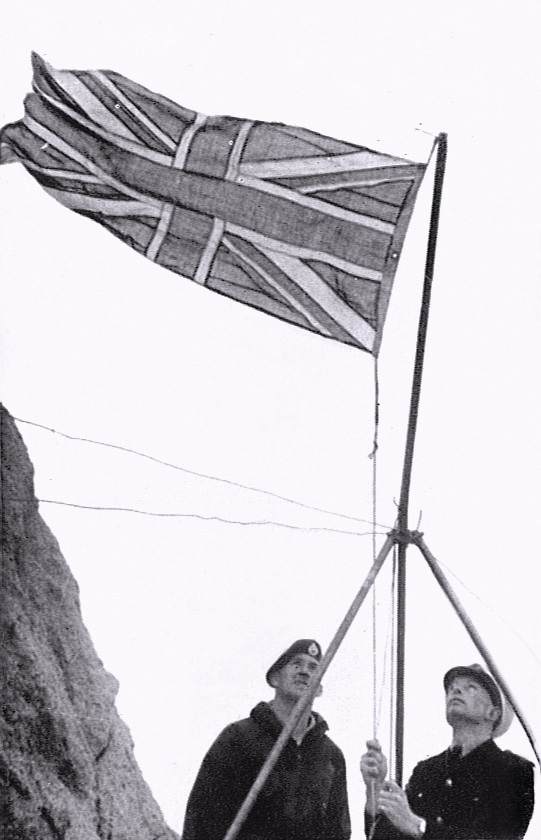
Lieutenant Commander Desmond Scott hoists the Union Flag in 1955

On 18 September 1955 at precisely 10:16 am, Rockall was declared officially annexed by the British Crown when Lieutenant-Commander Desmond Scott RN, Sergeant Brian Peel RM, Corporal AA Fraser RM, and James Fisher (a civilian naturalist and former Royal Marine), were deposited on the island by a Royal Navy helicopter from HMS Vidal (coincidentally named after the man who first charted the island). The team cemented in a brass plaque on Hall's Ledge and hoisted the Union Flag to stake the UK's claim. However, any effect of this annexation on valuable maritime rights claims under UNCLOS in the waters beyond 12 nautical miles from Rockall is neither claimed by Britain nor recognised by Denmark (for the Faroe Islands), Iceland or Ireland.

== See also ==
- Guano Islands Act
- Hard power
- Imperialism
- Irredentism
- List of military occupations
- List of national border changes from 1815 to 1914
- List of national border changes (1914–present)
- Timeline of geopolitical changes
