= Anne Knowles =

Anne Knowles may refer to:

- Anne Kelly Knowles (born 1957), American geographer
- Anne Knollys, pronounced and sometimes spelt Knowles, lady-in-waiting to Elizabeth I of England
