= Anne Kelly Knowles =

American geographer (born 1957)

Anne Kelly Knowles (born 1957) is an American geographer and a specialist in Historical GIS. After teaching for over ten years at Middlebury College in Vermont as a professor of geography, she is now a professor of history at University of Maine.

== Biography ==
She received her MA and PhD from University of Wisconsin–Madison. Her first book, Calvinists Incorporated Welsh Immigrants on Ohio’s Industrial Frontier examined the influence of immigrants’ traditions and social values on their economic behavior during the industrialization of their new region as workers and investors in Welsh-owned charcoal iron companies.

In 2002, she edited the first book ever published with case studies of the use of Historical GIS in various disciplines. She was the guest editor of a special issue of the journal Social Science History about this field.

Her research has included spatial analysis of the role of skilled ironworkers in the transfer of technology in the U.S. iron industry 1800–1868, and the mapping of the Holocaust.

== Awards ==
Guggenheim Fellowship (2015).

John Brinkerhoff Jackson Book Award, Association of American Geographers (2014).

American Ingenuity Award for Historical Scholarship, Smithsonian magazine (2012).

National Science Foundation Collaborative Research Grant, Holocaust Historical GIS, with Alberto Giordano as fellow PI (2008 – 2011).

National Endowment for the Humanities Research Fellowship (2005).

American Council of Learned Societies Research Fellowship (1999).

== Selected works ==
- Knowles, Anne Kelly; Tim Cole; Alberto Giordano (eds.). 2014. Geographies of the Holocaust Bloomington: Indiana University Press. At IU Press. ISBN 978-0-253-01211-1. OCLC 878923847.
- Knowles, Anne Kelly. 2013. Mastering Iron: The Struggle to Modernize an American Industry. University of Chicago Press. OCLC 777327548
- Placing History: How Maps, Spatial Data, and GIS Are Changing Historical Scholarship (2008), edited Knowles, digital supplement edited by Amy Hillier. Redlands, Cal.: ESRI Press.
- Knowles, Anne Kelly ed. 2005. Emerging Trends in Historical GIS. In Historical Geography, Baton Rouge, LA: Geoscience Publications.
- Knowles, Anne Kelly, 2002. Past Time, Past Place: GIS for History. ESRI press ISBN 1-58948-032-5
- Knowles, Anne Kelly ed. 2000. Historical GIS: The Spatial Turn in Social Science History, Social Science History 24 (3).
- Knowles, Anne Kelly. 1997. Calvinists Incorporated: Welsh Immigrants on Ohio’s Industrial Frontier. ISBN 0-226-44853-3 OCLC 34965590
