= HistoAtlas =

- Company type: Nonprofit
- Website type: Historical Geographical Information System
- Headquarters: Leuven, Belgium
- Creator: Stefaan Desender
- Website: HistoAtlas
- Commercial: No
- Registration: Optional
- Launched: March 27, 2008
- Current status: perpetual work-in-progress

HistoAtlas is a free collection of historical geographic information of human culture all over the world. This is achieved as a time enabled geographic information system (GIS) on the web. All information can be used and edited freely and is intended to be a resource for education, archaeologists, historians and others.

== Introduction ==
HistoAtlas provides a system to actively maintain historical information derived from historical records and check if it is consistent. It is not meant for the discovery of new historical facts but to put everything together so it can be presented as one whole story.

Anyone can use the information and collaborate on the project. Its main audience is the general public but it should also contain enough historical details that historians should be able to use it.

HistoAtlas is not only able to visualize the changes in extent of different countries, but also the events that caused this change.

The atlas has information about different aspects of history. A few examples.

- Political boundaries based on antique historical records or archeological research.
- Historical events like wars, disasters, discoveries, treaties and journeys that shaped the course of time.
- Facts about historical figures and their families that played an important role in history.
- The evolution of cultural aspects like languages and religions.

== Licensing ==
All data published under the project is put under a Creative Commons Attribution-ShareAlike License.

== See also ==
- Table of Historical Maps
