= TimeMap =

Open-source web mapping application

- Developers: Digital Innovation Unit (DIU) at The University of Sydney
- Available in: English
- Type: Geographic Information System (GIS), Historical geographic information system (Historical GIS), Interactive Maps and Animated Mapping
- Website: TimeMap

TimeMap Java is an open-source web mapping application, which was one of the first such applications to introduce generic time filtering and map animation on the web. TMJava is a comprehensive Java mapping applet which can run as a standalone application with local data, on a web site or as a two tier application with a backend server and independent metadata clearinghouse, supporting distributed data sources.

TimeMap developed out of work on mapping historical and archaeological data, starting with animated maps in 1995, a Windows mapping tool in 1997, and TMJava from 2001. Funding came from numerous sources but in particular from the Australian Research Council (Sydney TimeMap project, 2000–2002) and from the Electronic Cultural Atlas Initiative (1998–2005). TimeMap is available as open-source on SourceForge.

TimeMap's Windows tool, TMWin, is a metadata development and map building tool which publishes interactive maps to a website using data referenced in the Electronic Cultural Atlas Initiative's metadata clearinghouse.

== Capabilities ==
TMJava can be used to develop interactive maps for web sites, for intranet enquiry systems, for museum and visitor kiosks, and for standalone CD-ROM products. In addition to static datasets, TMJava can connect with databases which are being actively updated or with live data feeds.

TMJava includes legend and layer management features designed to handle complex maps and large datasets, with incremental loading that provides additional levels of detail as users zoom in.

== Applications ==
TimeMap's is used as the core technology to number of applications, including:

- Electronic Cultural Atlas Initiative Clearinghouse Search

TMJava provides map-based spatial searching of the ECAI clearinghouse of cultural datasets and background geographic data. The search includes the Rumsey Map Collection, one of the largest digitised collections of historical maps in the world. Search results can be overlaid and displayed in the TMJava map interface, as well as through WMS and Macromedia Flash (.swf) views.

- MacquarieNet Atlas of Indigenous Australia

TMJava is used by MacquarieNet's Atlas of Indigenous Australia (free access) and Explore Australia (subscription) interactive maps. Users can display and overlay the many thematic maps of the Atlas.

- UNHCR refugee resources mapping

A TMJava-based CDROM was developed in 2006 by UNHCR to map refugee resources and refugee camps in Liberia. Poster 2006 by Yann Rebois, UNHCR and CartoONG, Simplified web map version

- Community Adversity and Resilience

A TMJava-based CD-ROM accompanying Professor Tony Vinson's important 2004 Community Adversity and Resilience report on behalf of Jesuit Social Services to the NSW and Victorian governments.
