= Norman J. W. Thrower =

American scholar (1919–2002)

- Born: October 23, 1919; Crowthorne, England.
- Died: September 2, 2020 (aged 100); Pacific Palisades, Los Angeles, U.S.
- Occupations: Historian, professor, writer, cartographer
- Writing career
- Genres: History, geography
- Subjects: mapping, surveying, European history

Norman J. W. Thrower (1919–2020) was an American scholar noted for his work in history, geography, and surveying practices. His areas of expertise included mapping, surveying, Sir Francis Drake, Isaac Newton, Edmond Halley. He was also a professor at the University of California, Los Angeles and authored several books.

== Personal life ==
Norman Thrower was born in England in 1919 and died in 2020. He was a veteran of World War II and served in India. After the war, Thrower became involved with the Directorate of Colonial Surveys which was later renamed the Directorate of Overseas Surveys.

== Professional life ==
In 1953, Thrower was awarded his Bachelor of Arts in geography from the University of Virginia. Subsequently, he attended the University of Wisconsin and earned his Ph.D. in 1958, also in geography. The subject of Thrower's dissertation was cadastral surveying, and in 1966 the dissertation was published by the Association of American Geographers.

In 1957, Thrower began working at the University of California, Los Angeles as a professor and retired from the university in 1990. While at UCLA, Thrower specialized in cartography, remote sensing, and Europe. He was associated with the director of the UCLA Center for Medieval and Renaissance Studies and directed the Christopher Columbus Quincentenary Programs at the UCLA Center for Medieval and Renaissance Studies. He was also the director of UCLA's William Andrews Clark Memorial Library. Thrower has notes, papers, and correspondence archived at UCLA.

In addition to his work at UCLA, Thrower was also involved with other organizations. From 1973 to 1975, he was President of the Society for the History of Discoveries. Thrower held the position as the founding President of the California Map Society in 1979. And from 1975 to 1981 Thrower served as president for the State of California's Sir Francis Drake Commission.

== Selected bibliography of Thrower’s works ==
- Thrower, Norman J.W. (1972). Maps & Man: An Examination of Cartography in Relation to Culture and Civilization. Englewood Cliffs: Prentice-Hall.
- Thrower, Norman J.W. (1981). The Three Voyages of Edmond Halley in the Paramore, 1698-1701. London: Hakluyt Society.
- Thrower, Norman J.W. (1990). Standing on the Shoulders of Giants: A Longer View of Newton and Halley. Berkeley: University of California Press.
- Thrower, Norman J.W. (1996). Maps and Civilization: Cartography in Culture and Society. Chicago: University of Chicago Press.
- Thrower, Norman J.W. (1999). Maps and Civilization: Cartography in Culture and Society (2nd ed.). Chicago: University of Chicago Press. {Review}
- Thrower, Norman J.W. (2008). Maps and Civilization: Cartography in Culture and Society (3rd ed.). Chicago: University of Chicago Press.
