= Electronic Cultural Atlas Initiative =

US-based humanities initiative

The dynamic map selection page from the ECAI website.

The Electronic Cultural Atlas Initiative (ECAI) is a digital humanities initiative involving numerous academic professors and institutions around the world with the stated goal of creating a networked digital atlas by creating tools and setting standards for dynamic, digital maps.

ECAI was established in 1997 by Emeritus Prof. Lewis Lancaster of the University of California, Berkeley, and has held two meetings per year most years from 1998 - 2009 (ongoing), one of which is often in conjunction with the Pacific Neighbourhood Consortium. The initiative is based at UC Berkeley.

The ECAI 'clearinghouse' of distributed digital datasets was developed from 1998 by the Archaeological Computing Laboratory at the University of Sydney, and uses the ACL's TimeMap software.

== See also ==
- GIS
