= The Penguin Atlas of World History =

- 2004 English Editions
- Author: Hermann Kinder
- Original title: Atlas zur Weltgeschichte
- Illustrator: Werner Hilgemann
- Language: English
- Genre: Historical atlas
- Publisher: Penguin Books
- Publication date: 1964 (German), 1974, 2004
- Publication place: United States
- Media type: Paperback
- ISBN: 978-0-14-101263-6

The Penguin Atlas of World History is a two-volume, paperback-sized historical atlas first published by Penguin Books in 1974, with the latest edition published in 2004. It was translated from a German atlas, dtv-Atlas Weltgeschichte by Hermann Kinder and Werner Hilgemann, originally published by Deutsche Taschenbuch Verlag ten years prior to the first English edition, in 1964.

Volume 1 encompasses pre-history to the eve of the French Revolution, and Volume 2 includes the Revolution itself and extends to the Iraq War. The book is formatted such that maps appear on the left-hand page with accompanying textual notations on the right, as opposed to most larger-format atlases that feature irregular and mixed formatting of text and maps. However, time lines, such as one tracing the development of life, and organizational charts, such as a graphic depicting the workings of the United Nations according to its charter, are occasionally featured as well.

The Atlas is also notable for Werner Hilgemann's unique cartographical style, which treats city and state names on maps as political/governing entities, allowing them to be graphically linked with other labels to show alliances and treaties, thereby adding an extra informational dimension.

== See also ==
- Timeline
- Thematic map
- Cartography
