= Historical geographic information system =

GIS tracking temporal changes

A historical geographic information system (also written as historical GIS or HGIS) is a geographic information system that may display, store and analyze data of past geographies and track changes in time. It is a tool for historical geography.

== Techniques ==
Historical geographic information systems are built from a variety of sources and techniques. An especially prominent method is the digitization and georeferencing of historical maps. Old maps may contain valuable information about the past. By adding coordinates to such maps, they may be added as a feature layer to modern GIS data. This facilitates comparison of different map layers showing the geography at different times. The maps may be further enhanced by techniques such as rubbersheeting, which spatially warps the data to fit with more accurate modern maps. Large map collections, such as the David Rumsey Historical Map Collection, have digitized and georeferenced their maps and published them on the Internet, making them accessible for a variety of projects.

Georeferencing historical microdata, such as census or parish records, allows researchers to conduct spatial analysis of historical data. Comparisons between statistical areas can require reconstructing former political boundaries and other types of borders and tracking their evolution.

== Notable historical GIS projects ==
- The Atlas of Historical County Boundaries tracks the evolution of U.S. counties.
- China Historical Geographic Information System is a project on Imperial China developed by Harvard University and Fudan University.
- Electronic Cultural Atlas Initiative (ECAI) is a clearinghouse for the exchange of metadata of Historical GIS. Maintained by the University of California, Berkeley.
- Euratlas History Maps is a historical atlas of Europe from year 1 to present days with one map per century. The maps depict sovereign states as well as administrative divisions and dependent territories.
- Great Britain Historical GIS is a GIS-enabled database holding diverse geo-referenced maps, statistics, gazetteers and travel writing, especially for the period 1801–2001 covered by British censuses. Created and maintained by Portsmouth University.
- HistoAtlas is an open historical geographical information system that tries to build a free historical atlas of the world.
- National Historical Geographic Information System (NHGIS) is a system for displaying and analyzing Census tracts and tract changes in the United States.
- OpenHistoricalMap is an open-source historical world atlas based on OpenStreetMap technology and practices.

== Software or web services developed for Historical GIS ==
- Google Earth added a time line feature in version 4 (2006) that enables simple temporal browsing of spatial data.
- TimeMap is a Java open-source applet (or program) for browsing spatial-temporal data and ECAI data sets. Developed by the department of archaeology University of Sydney.

== See also ==
- Digital history
- Geographic information system § Adding the dimension of time
- GIS in archaeology
- Landscape history
- Rephotography
- Spatiotemporal database
- Time geography
