= List of national border changes (1815–1914) =

The list of national border changes from 1815 to 1914 refers to the changes in international borders since the end of the Napoleonic Wars until World War I. This period of time saw the fall of the Spanish colonial empire to the United States and the progression of European colonial efforts. This period also saw the reshaping of Europe with the rise of the German Empire and Italy as unified states, while the Ottoman Empire's territory in Europe steadily dissolved. This was the time of continued colonisation of Africa during the age of New Imperialism. In Asia, the Mughal Empire fell to the British, while the French colonised Indochina. In North America, the United States, as well as the new nation of Canada, expanded their territories. Over 40% of the world's borders today were drawn as a result of British and French imperialism.

As a result of New Imperialism, the European countries with the most colonies throughout history were: the United Kingdom (130), France (90), Portugal (52), Spain (44), the Netherlands (29), Germany (20), Russia (17), Denmark (9), Sweden (8), Italy (7), Norway (6), and Belgium (3).

== Africa ==
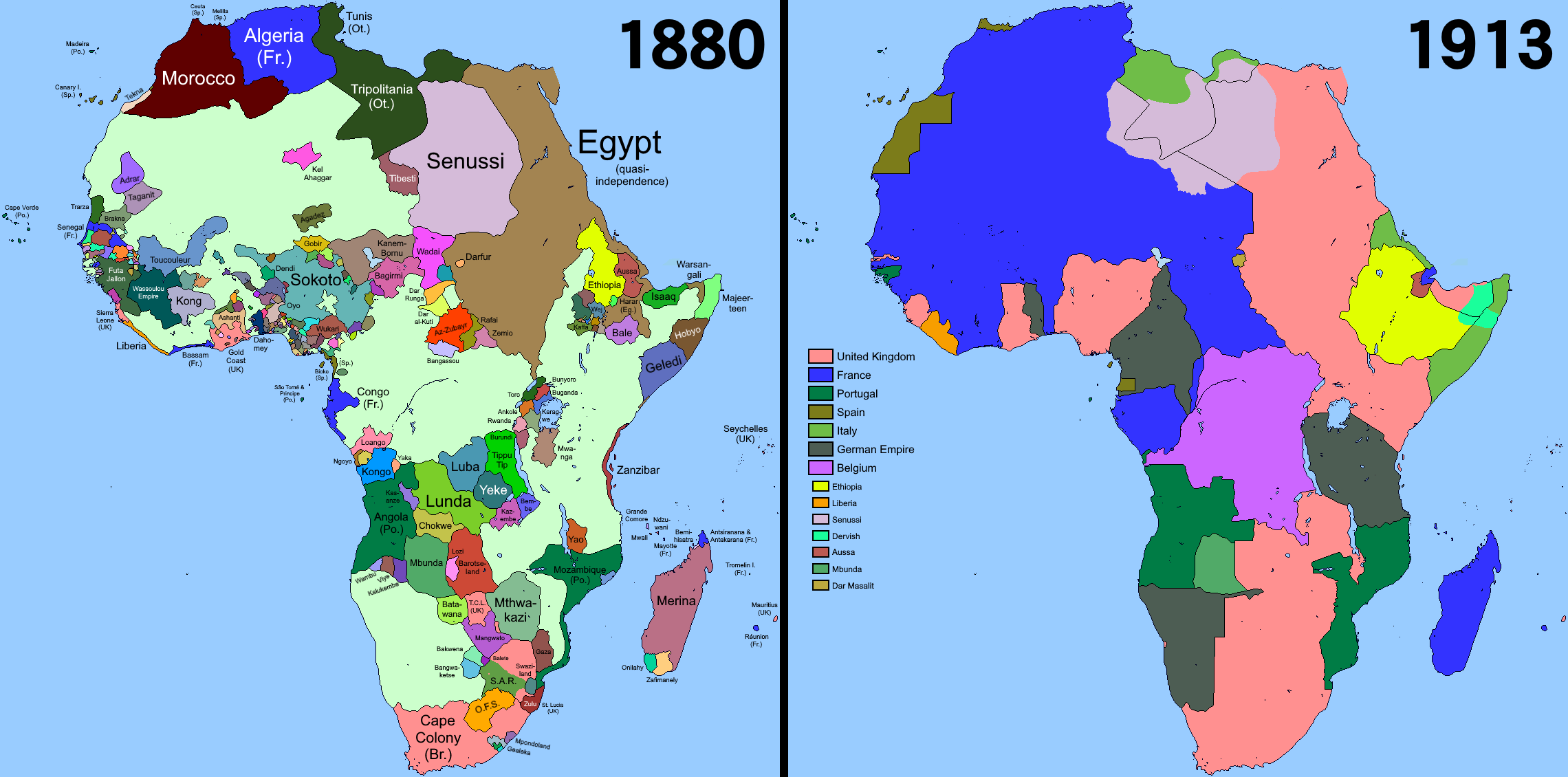
Comparison of Africa in the years 1880 and 1913.

- 1820–1821 – The colony of Liberia is founded by former slaves from the United States.
- 1834 – The colony of French Algeria is formally established.
- 1852 – The state of Transvaal is founded following the Sand River Convention.
- 1854 – The Orange Free State is founded in what is today South Africa.
- 1877 – Transvaal is dissolved after the First Boer War.
- 1881 – France creates the colony of Brazzaville. Tunisia is made a French protectorate. Transvaal is recreated with the agreement at the Pretoria Convention, which gives the local Boer population self-rule.
- 1882 – Egypt is occupied by the United Kingdom and becomes a de facto protected state.
- 1884 – The colony of British Somaliland is created. Germany creates the colonies of Kamerun and German South West Africa.
- 1885 – The colony of German East Africa is created. The Belgian Congo is created (then officially called the Congo Free State).
- 1889–1890 – Italy establishes its first two colonies, the colony of Eritrea in 1889 and the colony of Italian Somaliland, which is created in 1889 and quickly expands until 1890.
- 1894 – Dahomey (now named Benin) is annexed by France as a colony.
- 1899–1902 – The Second Boer War occurs in which two independent, self-governed Boer Republics, known as the Orange Free State and the South African Republic, created by the Dutch-speaking inhabitants of the Cape Colony, are occupied by the British Empire and become the Orange River Colony and Transvaal Colony.
- 1910 – The Cape Colony, Natal Colony, Transvaal Colony and Orange River Colony are united to form the Union of South Africa. French Equatorial Africa is founded, uniting the territories of Gabon, Middle Congo (now the Republic of the Congo), and Oubangui-Chari (or Ubangi-Shari, now the Central African Republic).
- 1911 – France cedes territory to German Cameroon.
- 1912 – The Ottoman Empire loses Libyan provinces to Italy. Morocco becomes a French colony.

== Asia ==
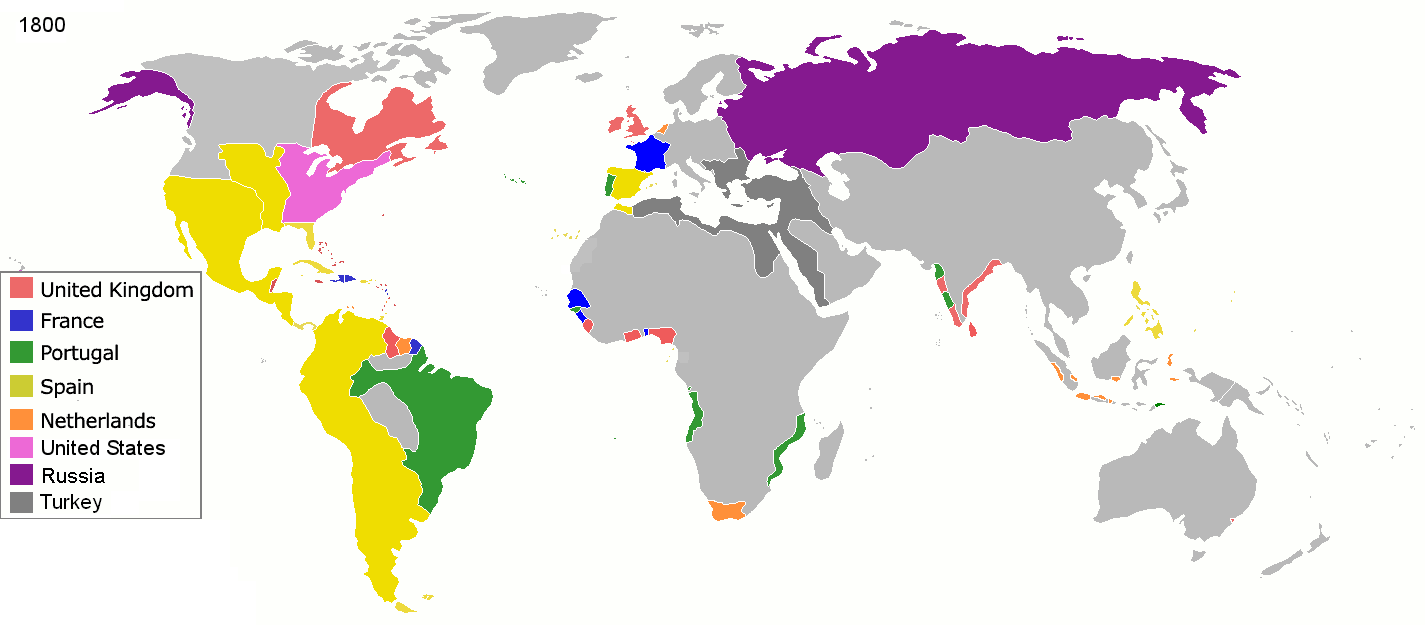
Imperial powers in 1800

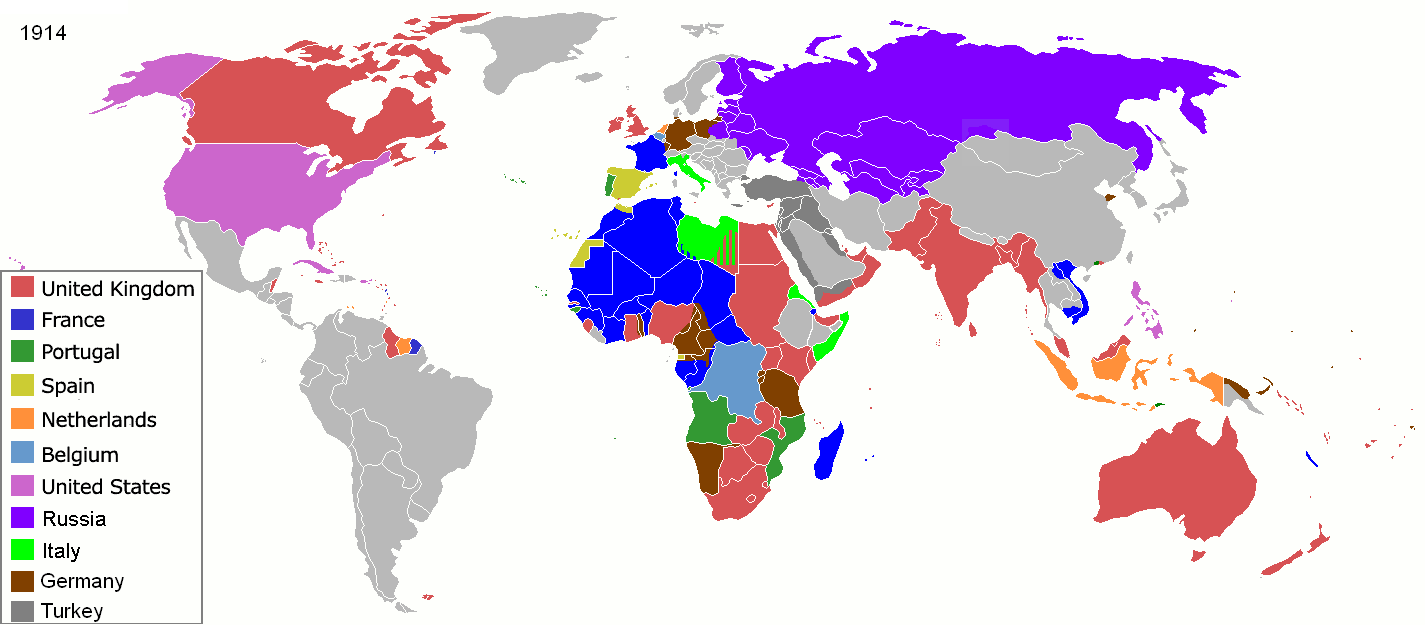
Imperial powers in 1914

- 1816 – Nepal ceded 1/3 of its territory to the East India Company as part of the Sugauli Treaty.
- 1818 – The occupation of Dutch settlements in India by the British is ended; Malabar is annexed to British India, while Coromandel is ceded to the Netherlands.
- 1825 – Coromandel is ceded back to British India.
- 1839 – Serampore is sold from Denmark to British India.
- 1845 – Tranquebar, Frederiksnagore, and most other Danish Indian settlements are sold to British India.
- 1853 – Darjeeling district and Morang of Sikkim are annexed to British India.
- 1857 – The remainder of the Mughal Empire dissolves and becomes part of British India.
- 1858–1860 – Outer Manchuria is ceded to the Russian Empire by the Qing Empire (Manchu) of China.
- 1869 – Denmark cedes the Nicobar Islands to the United Kingdom.
- 1895 – After China loses the First Sino-Japanese War, China is forced to concede Formosa (now called Taiwan) to Japan.
- 1898 – With the end of the Spanish–American War, Spain cedes the Philippines to the United States. The Sultanate of Sulu is annexed.
- 1902, June 7 – China cedes 0.46 km^{2} of land in the city of Tianjin to Italy. This was one of a significant number of territorial concessions to a number of countries in the city of Tianjin for trade and political purposes.
- 1913 – Al-Hasa is transferred from the Ottoman Empire to the Kingdom of Nejd.

== Europe ==
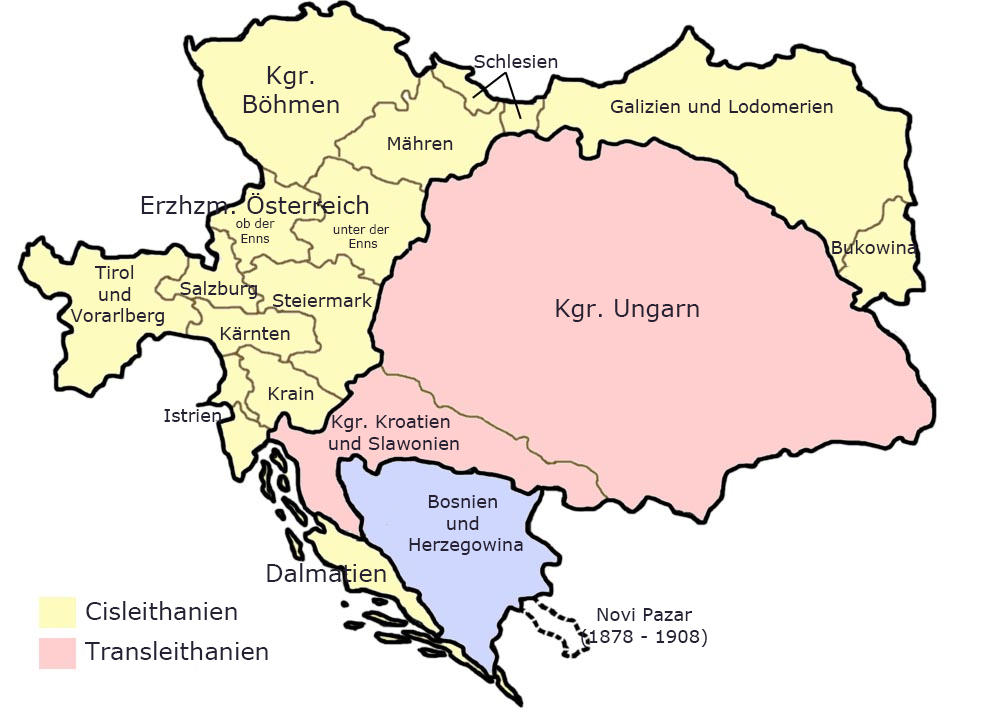
The Austro-Hungarian annexation of Bosnia (blue) in 1908 was a crucial turning point in European diplomacy that produced many of the conditions that contributed to World War I.

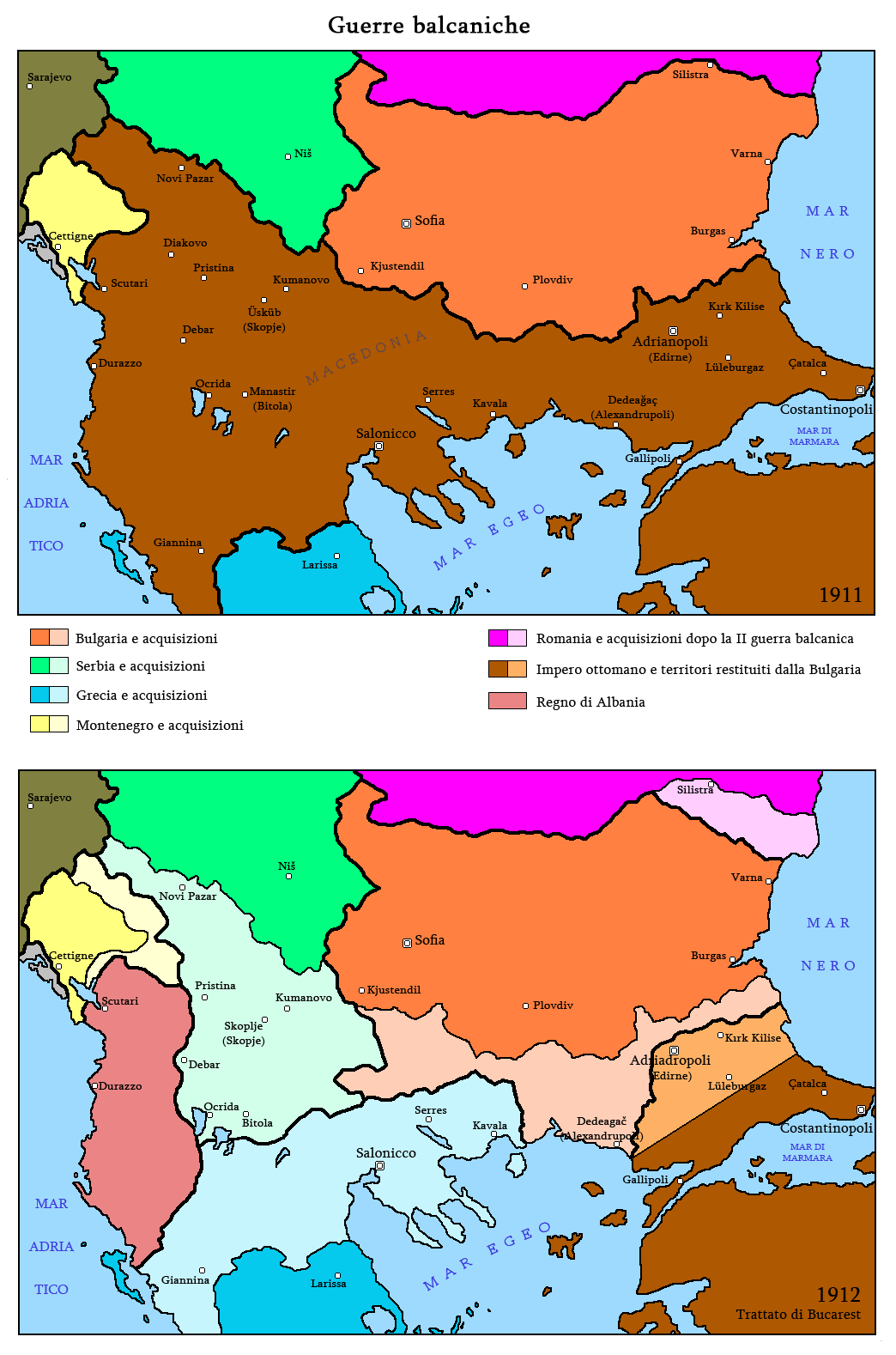
The territorial gains of the Balkan states after the Balkan Wars.

- 1815 – Congress of Vienna: With the defeat of Napoleon in 1814, Europe is substantially reorganised, with France losing large amounts of territory and the reorganisation of the German states.
- 1829 – Treaty of Adrianople: The Ottoman Empire returns Brăila, Giurgiu and Turnu Măgurele to Wallachia.
- 1830 – London Protocol: Greece attains independence from the Ottoman Empire.
- 1839 – Treaty of London: Belgium separates from the Netherlands; a major part of the Grand Duchy of Luxembourg becomes the Belgian Province of Luxembourg; the Duchy of Limburg separates from the Netherlands and joins the German Confederation.
- 1846 – The Free City of Cracow is annexed by the Austrian Empire.
- 1850 – The German principalities of Hohenzollern-Sigmaringen and Hohenzollern-Hechingen are ceded by their rulers to the Kingdom of Prussia.
- 1856 – Southern Bessarabia is ceded to Moldavia by the Treaty of Paris.
- 1859 – Moldavia unites with Wallachia to form the United Principalities of Moldavia and Wallachia (later renamed as the Principality of Romania). As a result of the Second Italian War of Independence, the Austrian Empire cedes Lombardy to the Kingdom of Piedmont-Sardinia. The Duchy of Parma, Duchy of Modena and Reggio, Grand Duchy of Tuscany, and the Papal Legations combine to form the United Provinces of Central Italy.
- 1860 – Parma, Tuscany, Modena, and Romagna vote in referendums to join the Kingdom of Sardinia. France forces the Kingdom of Sardinia to cede Savoy and Nice to France. Sardinia occupies most of the Papal States, with the exception of a narrow strip of land comprising Rome.
- 1861 – The Kingdom of Italy is founded by the unification of the Kingdom of Sardinia, the United Provinces of Central Italy (a Sardinian client state), and the Kingdom of the Two Sicilies.
- 1864 – Denmark is forced to concede Schleswig to Prussia and Holstein to Austria.
- 1864 - Treaty of Lisbon: Spain and Portugal agree to share the Couto Mixto, which will go to Spain, and the "promiscuous towns", which will go to Portugal.
- 1866 – Austria cedes Holstein to Prussia and Lombardy-Venetia to Italy, a Prussian ally, after Austria loses the Austro-Prussian War. Prussia annexes the Kingdom of Hanover.
- 1867 – Prussia and the North German states unite to form the North German Federation.
- 1870 – Rome joins Italy.
- 1871 – The North German Federation and the South German states, with the exception of the Austrian Empire, join together to form the German Empire, the state that is considered the beginning of modern-day Germany. Alsace–Lorraine is ceded by France to Germany.
- 1878 – The Russo-Turkish War (1877–1878) ends with the Treaty of San Stefano. The Principality of Bulgaria is established. The Ottoman Empire recognises Montenegro and cedes Nikšić, Podgorica, and Antivari. The Principality of Serbia gains independence and annexes Niš and Leskovac. Romanian independence is recognised by the Ottoman Empire. The Russian Empire cedes Northern Dobruja to Romania, and Romania cedes Southern Bessarabia to Russia. The Ottoman Empire cedes Ardahan, Artvin, Batum, Kars, Olti, Beyazit, and Alashkert. The Vilayet of Bosnia becomes an autonomous province. However, with the Treaty of Berlin, the territories are changed, the Principality of Bulgaria's borders are reduced, Eastern Rumelia is created as an autonomous province of the Ottoman Empire, and Bosnia vilayet is occupied by Austria-Hungary.
- 1881 – The Kingdom of Romania supersedes the Principality of Romania.
- 1882 – The Kingdom of Serbia supersedes the Principality of Serbia.
- 1885 – The Principality of Bulgaria annexes Eastern Rumelia.
- 1890 – Personal union between the Kingdom of the Netherlands and the Grand Duchy of Luxembourg ends.
- 1905 – Norway separates from Sweden, dissolving the Union between Sweden and Norway.
- 1908 – Austria-Hungary annexes occupied Bosnia, and the Condominium of Bosnia and Herzegovina is established.
- 1912–1913 – The two Balkan Wars occur and end with the Ottoman Empire being forced to concede more territory during the Treaty of Bucharest (1913). This included allowing the creation of the state of Albania. Serbia expands to Vardar Macedonia, gaining regions including Ohrid, Bitola, Kosovo, Štip, and Kočani. Greece gains Epirus, southern Macedonia, Thessaloniki, Kavala, and parts of the Aegean Littoral. Bulgaria gains Strumica, Western Thrace, and a section of the Aegean Littoral. Romania first gains from Bulgaria the port of Silistra with the Protocol of St. Petersburg of 1913 and then the region of Southern Dobruja following the Second Balkan War. With these losses, the Ottoman Empire is almost completely cut off from Europe.

== North America ==
- 1815 – With the end of the War of 1812, the borders between British North America and the United States return to their pre-war borders.
- 1818 – The borders between British North America and the United States during the Treaty of 1818 are established at the 49th parallel north, west of the Lake of the Woods. The Oregon Country is established by both the United States and Britain, which hold it in condominium.
- 1821, July 10 – The borders between Oregon Country and Mexico are changed, as well as Spain ceding Florida, after Spain ratifies the Adams–Onís Treaty, which was drafted in 1819.
- 1822–1823 – The First Mexican Empire annexes Central America, but Central America declares independence in July 1823 following the fall of the Mexican monarchy.
- 1836, March 2 – The Republic of Texas is declared after it separates from Mexico, but its western territory remains disputed with Mexico.
- 1845, December 29 – Texas is annexed by the United States.
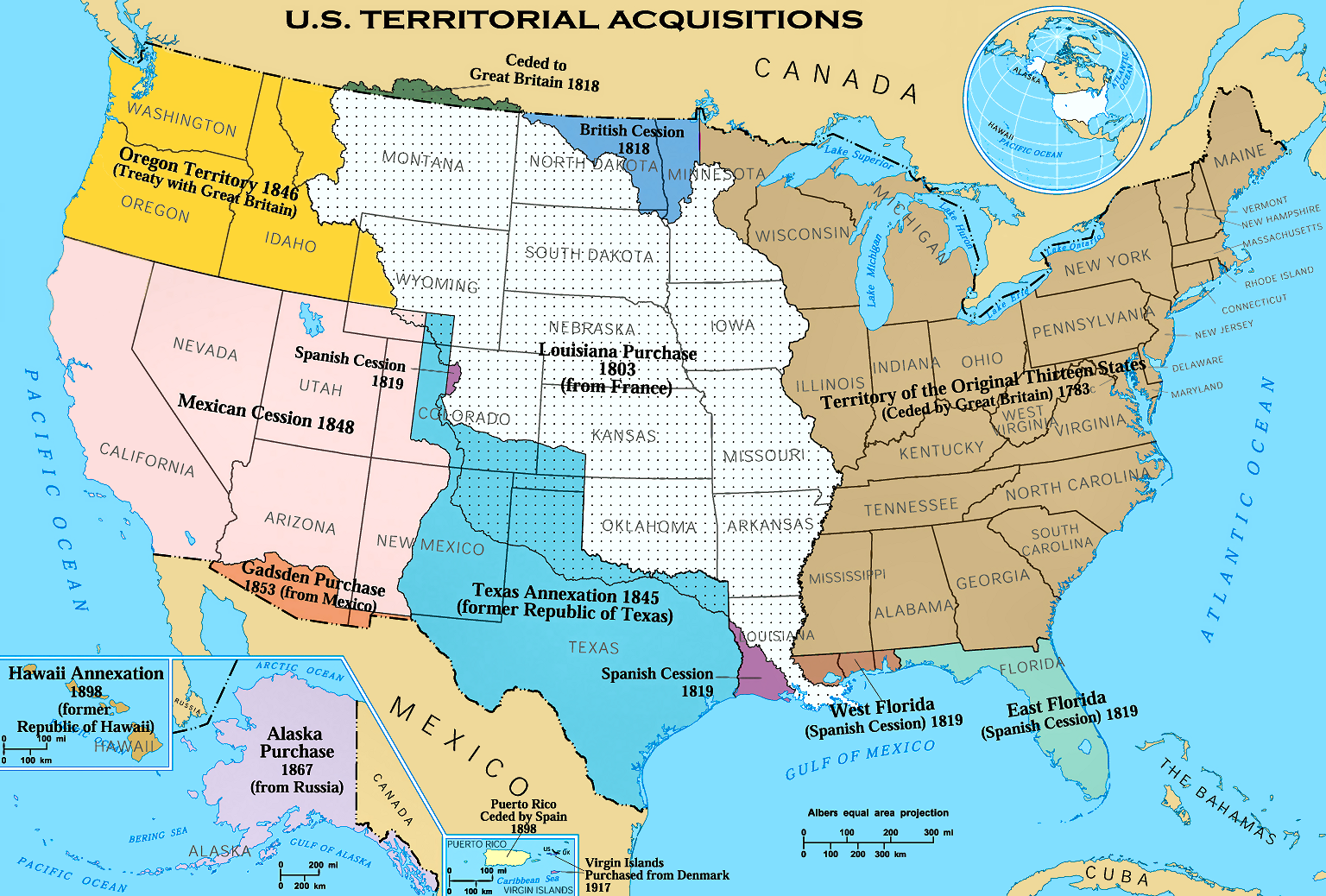
  Territorial acquisitions of the United States between 1783 and 1917.
- 1846, June 18 – The Oregon Treaty ends the sharing of the Oregon Country, with the territory north of the 49th parallel going to British Columbia and the territory south of the 49th parallel becoming an unorganised territory of the United States.
- 1846–1848 – The Mexican–American War occurs and ends with the Treaty of Guadalupe Hidalgo, in which Mexico cedes territories consisting of all of present-day California, Nevada, Utah, most of Arizona, and portions of Colorado, New Mexico, and Wyoming.
- 1853, December 30 – The Gadsden Purchase gives territory from Mexico to the United States, establishing the present-day border with Mexico.
- 1861–1865 – The American Civil War happens. After the Confederate States of America (CSA) is founded in February of the year, war breaks out in April between the Unionists and the Confederates of the CSA, as well as rebel CSA-supporting governments in some southern states. The war ended with the CSA being defeated and the southern states readmitted into the United States.
- 1867, July 1 – Canada is created after the British North American provinces of Ontario, Quebec, New Brunswick, and Nova Scotia join during the Canadian Confederation.
- 1867, October 11 – The United States annexes Alaska after it is sold from Russia in the Alaska Purchase.
- 1870, July 15 – The United Kingdom formally cedes the North-Western Territory and Rupert's Land and its interests there to Canada, and the province of Manitoba joins Canada.
- 1871, July 20 – The British colony of British Columbia joins Canada.
- 1873, July 1 – Prince Edward Island joins Canada.
- 1880, September 1 – The United Kingdom cedes its remaining Arctic Islands to Canada.
- 1903, October 20 – The Hay-Herbert Treaty is signed by Britain and the United States, which settles the Alaska boundary dispute between Canada and the United States, which gives the United States more territory.

== Oceania ==
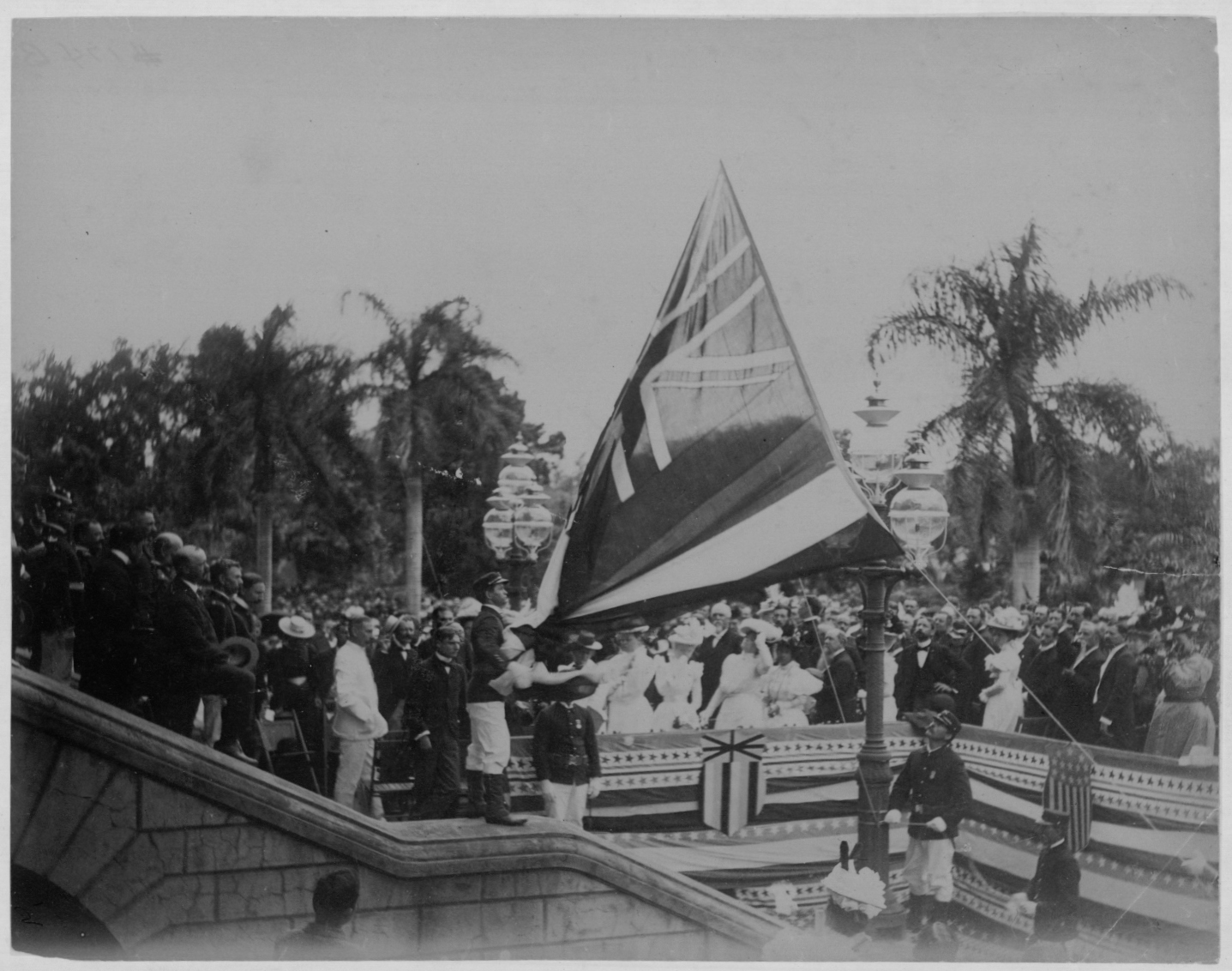
The Flag of Hawaii over ʻIolani Palace is lowered following the Annexation of Hawaii by the United States (12 August 1898).

- 1857 – Baker Island is annexed by the United States.
- 1860, February 8 – Kingman Reef is informally taken by the United States (it would not be formally annexed until May 10, 1922).
- 1867, August 28 – Midway Atoll is annexed by the United States.
- 1856, September 28 – Howland Island is annexed by the United States.
- 1858 – The modern-day Cook Islands unite to form the Kingdom of Rarotonga. February 27 – Jarvis Island is annexed by the United States.
- 1888 – The United Kingdom annexes the Kingdom of Rarotonga, whose territory later becomes known as the Cook Islands. Nauru is annexed by Germany.
- 1889, June 3 – Jarvis Island is annexed by the United Kingdom after the United States abandons it.
- 1898, August 12 – The Republic of Hawaii is annexed by the United States. Guam is ceded from Spain to the United States.
- 1899, January 17 – Wake Island is annexed by the United States. September 16 – Johnston Atoll is annexed by the United States. The Tripartite Convention divides the Samoan archipelago between Germany and the United States, respectively, creating American Samoa and German Samoa. With the end of the Spanish–American War, Spanish colonies in Oceania are divided: Germany gains the Mariana Islands (except Guam) and the Caroline Islands; Spain cedes Guam to the United States.
- 1901, January 1 – The state of Australia is formed from six British colonies.
- 1912, February 21 – Palmyra Atoll is annexed by the United States.

== South America ==
Bolivia's territorial losses (1867–1938)

- 1819 – Gran Colombia (Greater Colombia) is created from New Granada, the Royal Audience of Quito, and former Spanish territories, composed of modern-day Colombia, Ecuador, Panama, Venezuela and other territories.
- 1831 – Gran Colombia is dissolved and the following states are created: the Republic of New Granada (Colombia), Ecuador, and Venezuela.
- 1836–1839 – The War of the Confederation, which is fought between the recently formed Peru–Bolivian Confederation versus Chile and its ally Argentina as well as anti-confederate Peruvians. The war ended with Chile winning the war and the re-creation of the separate states of Peru and Bolivia.
- 1872 – The Loizaga–Cotegipe Treaty established the boundaries between Paraguay and Brazil after Paraguay's defeat in the Paraguayan War.
- 1884 – Bolivia signed a truce, the Treaty of Valparaiso, that ended the War of the Pacific and accepted the military occupation of the entire Bolivian coast. The Treaty of Peace and Friendship (1904) ceded the complete region of Antofagasta to Chile.
- 1899–1900 – The breakaway state of the Republic of Acre is formed after Acre (state) separates from Bolivia and is annexed by Brazil three years later.
- 1903 – Panama separates from Colombia.

== See also ==
- Territorial evolution of the British Empire
- Timeline of geopolitical changes
