= Timeline of geopolitical changes =

Timeline of geopolitical changes may refer to:

Geopolitical changes:

- Timeline of geopolitical changes (before 1500)
- Timeline of geopolitical changes (1500–1899)
- Timeline of geopolitical changes (1900–1999)
- Timeline of geopolitical changes (2000–present)

National border changes:

- List of territory purchased by a sovereign nation from another sovereign nation
- List of national border changes (1815–1914)
- List of national border changes (1914–present)
