= List of playwrights =

Playwright list

This is a list of notable playwrights. See also Literature; Drama; List of playwrights by nationality and date of birth; Lists of authors.

== A ==
=== Ab–An ===
- George Francis Abbott (1887–1995, United States)
- Catherine Obianuju Acholonu (1951–2014, Nigeria)
- Kjeld Abell (1901–1961, Denmark)
- Paul Ableman (1927–2006, England)
- Marcel Achard (1899–1974, France)
- Herbert Achternbusch (1938–2022, Germany)
- J. R. Ackerley (1896–1967, England)
- Rodney Ackland (1908–1991, England)
- Adam de la Halle (c. 1237 – c. 1288, France)
- Arthur Adamov (1908–1970, France)
- Arthur Henry Adams (1872–1936, New Zealand/Australia)
- Francis Adams (1862–1893, England)
- Marion Adams-Acton (1846–1928, Scotland)
- Joseph Addison (1672–1719, England)
- George Ade (1866–1944, United States)
- Mirza Adeeb (1914–1999, Pakistan)
- David Adjmi (born 1973, United States)
- Aeschylus (c. 525–456 BCE, Ancient Greece)
- Max Afford (1906–1954, Australia)
- Aleksandr Nikolayevich Afinogenov (1904–1941, Russia)
- Agathon (c. 448 – c. 400 BCE, Athens)
- Bola Agbaje (born c. 1981, England)
- Ama Ata Aidoo (1940–2023, Gold Coast, now Ghana)
- George L. Aiken (1830–1876, United States)
- Ayad Akhtar (born 1970, United States)
- Zoë Akins (1886–1958, United States)
- Vasily Pavlovich Aksyonov (1932–2009, Russia/Soviet Union)
- Juan Ruiz de Alarcón (c. 1581–1639, New Spain, now Mexico)
- Edward Albee (1928–2016, United States)
- Rafael Alberti (1902–1999, Spain)
- James Albery (1838–1889, England)
- Vasile Alecsandri (1821–1890, Romania)
- Grace Alexander (1872–1951, United States)
- Vittorio Alfieri (1749–1803, Italy)
- William Alfred (1922–1999, United States)
- Edward M. Alfriend (1837–1901, United States)
- Jay Presson Allen (1922–2006, United States)
- Jim Allen (1926–1999, England)
- Woody Allen (born Allan Stewart Konigsberg 1935, United States)
- Viscount of Almeida Garrett (1799–1854, Portugal)
- Robert Altman (1925–2006, United States)
- Alejandro Rodriguez Alvarez (1903–1965, Spain)
- Serafin and Joaquin Alvarez Quintero (1871–1938 and 1873–1944, Spain)
- Mark Ambient (1860–1937, England)
- Franco Ambriz (living, Brooklyn, New York)
- Angelo Ambrogini {redirect to Angelo Poliziano}
- Freddie Anderson (1922–2001, Ireland/Scotland)
- Jane Anderson (born c. 1954, United States)
- Maxwell Anderson (1888–1959, United States)
- Robert W. Anderson (1917–2009, United States)
- Stefan Andres (1906–1970, Germany)
- Leonid Andreyev (1871–1919, Russia)
- Lucius Livius Andronicus (c. 284 – c. 205 BCE, Ancient Rome)
- Maya Angelou (1928–2014, United States)
- Innokenty Fyodorovich Annensky (1856–1909, Russia)
- Jean Anouilh (1910–1987, France)
- S. Ansky (1863–1920, Russia) in Russian and Yiddish
- Ludwig Anzengruber (1839–1889, Austria)

=== Ap–Ay ===
- Guillaume Apollinaire (1880–1918, France)
- Jacob Appel (born 1973, United States)
- Manuel José Arce (1787–1847, Federal Republic of Central America)
- William Archibald (1917–1970, United States)
- Jane Arden (1927–1982)
- John Arden (1930–2012, England)
- Reinaldo Arenas (1943–1990, Cuba)
- Pietro Aretino (1492–1556, Italy)
- Ludovico Ariosto (1474–1533, Italy)
- Aristophanes (c. 446–385 BCE, Ancient Greece)
- Reginald Arkell (1881–1959, England)
- Michael Arlen (1895–1956, England)
- Roberto Arlt (1900–1942, Argentina)
- Robert Armin (c. 1563–1615, England)
- Simon Armitage (born 1963, England)
- Georges Arnaud (1917–1987, France)
- Carlos Arniches (1866–1943, Spain)
- Fernando Arrabal (born 1932, Spain)
- Francisco Arriví (1915–2007, Puerto Rico)
- Jorge Arroyo (born 1959, Costa Rica)
- Antón Arrufat (1935–2023, Cuba)
- Antonin Artaud (1896–1948, France)
- Sholem Asch (1880–1957, Poland/United States) in Yiddish
- Oscar Asche (1871–1936, Australia)
- Werner Aspenström (1918–1997, Sweden)
- Marie Aspioti (1909–2000, Corfu)
- Leilah Assunção (born 1943, Brazil)
- Aubignac {redirect to François Hédelin, abbé d'Aubignac}
- David Auburn (born 1969)
- Jacques Audiberti (1899–1965, France)
- Émile Augier (1820–1889, France)
- Alois Außerer (1876–1950, Austria)
- Arkady Averchenko (1881–1925, Russia/Czechoslovakia)
- George Axelrod (1922–2003, United States)
- Rachel Axler (living, United States)
- Alan Ayckbourn (born 1939, England)
- Marcel Aymé (1902–1967, France)
- Jakob Ayrer (c. 1543–1605 or 1625, Germany)
- Leslie Ayvazian (living, United States)

== B ==
=== Ba–Be ===
- Georges Baal (György Balassa, 1938–2013, Hungary/France)
- Isaak Emmanuilovich Babel (1894–1941, Russia), in Russian and Yiddish
- Ingeborg Bachmann (1926–1973, Austria)
- Phanuel Bacon (1700–1783, England)
- Enid Bagnold (1889–1981, England)
- Hermann Bahr (1863–1934, Austria)
- Paul Bailey (1937–2024, England)
- Annie Baker (born 1981, United States)
- George Pierce Baker (1866–1935, United States)
- John Roman Baker (born 1944, England)
- John Lloyd Balderston (1889–1954, United States)
- James Baldwin (1924–1987, United States)
- John Bale (1495–1563, England)
- Honoré de Balzac (1799–1850, France)
- Banabhatta (7th century CE, India, in Sanskrit)
- Francisco Antonio Bances y López-Candamo (1662–1704, Spain)
- Théodore de Banville (1823–1891, France)
- John Banks (c. 1650–1706, England)
- Imamu Amiri Baraka (1934–2014, United States)
- Maurice Baring (1874–1945, England)
- Howard Barker (born 1946, England)
- James Nelson Barker (1784–1858, United States)
- Meredydd Barker (living, Wales) in Welsh and English
- Ernst Barlach (1870–1938, Germany)
- Peter Barnes (1931–2004, England)
- Jeff Baron (living, United States)
- J. M. Barrie (1860–1937, Scotland)
- Desmond Barry (born 1954, Wales) in English
- Philip Barry (1896–1949, United States)
- Mike Bartlett (born 1980, England)
- Gabriel Barylli (born 1957, Austria)
- Peter Basch (1921–2004, Germany/United States)
- Ada Lee Bascom (unknown – 1928, United States)
- Todd Bash (born 1965, United States)
- Henri Bataille (1872–1922, France)
- Wolfgang Bauer (1941–2005, Austria)
- L. Frank Baum (1856–1919, United States)
- Terry Baum (born 1946, United States)
- Clifford Bax (1886–1962, England)
- Peter Bayley (1778–1823, England)
- Thomas Haynes Bayly (1797–1839, England)
- Richard Bean (born 1956, England)
- Pierre de Beaumarchais (1732–1799, France)
- Francis Beaumont (1584/1585–1616, England)
- Jim Beaver (born 1950, United States)
- Samuel Beazley (1786–1851, England)
- Ulrich Becher (1910–1990, Germany)
- Jürgen Becker (born 1959, Germany)
- Jurek Becker (1937–1997, Poland/Germany)
- Francis Beckett (born 1945, England)
- Samuel Beckett (1906–1989, Ireland) in English and French
- Henry Becque (1837–1899, France)
- Richard Beer-Hofmann (1866–1945, Austria)
- George Beeby (1869–1942, Australia)
- Chad Beguelin (born 1969, United States)
- Brendan Behan (1923–1964, Ireland)
- Aphra Behn (1640–1689, England)
- S. N. Behrman (1893–1973, United States)
- David Belasco (1853–1931, United States)
- T. James Belich (pseudonym: Colorado Tolston) (born 1976, United States)
- Florence Bell (1851–1930, England)
- Mary Hayley Bell (1911–2005, England)
- Luis de Belmonte y Bermúdez (c. 1590 – c. 1650, Spain)
- Jacinto Benavente (1866–1954, Spain)
- Victoria Benedictsson (1850–1888, Sweden)
- Sem Benelli (1877–1949, Italy)
- Ramvriksh Benipuri (1902–1968, India, in Hindi)
- Gottfried Benn (1886–1956, Germany)
- Alan Bennett (born 1934, England)
- Arnold Bennett (1867–1931, England)
- Angelo Beolco (1502–1542, Italy)
- Hjalmar Bergman (1883–1931, Sweden)
- Ingmar Bergman (1918–2007, Sweden)
- Reginald Berkeley (1890–1935, England)
- Steven Berkoff (born 1937, England)
- Alois Berla (1826–1896, Austria)
- Tess Berry-Hart (1978, England)
- Jean-Jacques Bernard (1888–1972, France)
- Tristan Bernard (1866–1947, France)
- William Bayle Bernard (1807–1875, England)
- Thomas Bernhard (1931–1989, Austria)
- Henri Bernstein (1876–1953, France)
- Rudolph Besier (1878–1942, England)
- György Bessenyei (1747–1811, Hungary)
- Eva Best (1851–1925, United States)
- Ugo Betti (1892–1953, Italy)
- Bahram Beyzai (1938–2025, Iran)

=== Bi–By ===
- Bernardo Dovizio da Bibbiena (1470–1520, Italy)
- Isaac Bickerstaffe (1735–1812, Ireland)
- Sieur de Bigot {redirect to Jean Palaprat}
- François Billetdoux (1927–1991, France)
- André Birabeau (1890–1974, France)
- Caroline Bird (born 1986, England)
- Robert Montgomery Bird (1806–1854, United States)
- Lajos Bíró (1880–1948, Hungary/England)
- Alexandre Bisson (1848–1912, France)
- Bjørnstjerne Bjørnson (1832–1910, Norway)
- Lewis Black (born 1948, United States)
- Helen Blakeman (born 1971, England)
- August Blanche (1811–1868, Sweden)
- Lee Blessing (born 1949, United States)
- Dharamvir Bharati (1926–1997, India) in Hindi
- Suessa Baldridge Blaine (1860–1932, United States)
- Marc Blitzstein (1905–1964, United States)
- Alexander Blok (1880–1921, Russia)
- James Boaden (1762–1839, England)
- Augusto Boal (1931–2009, Brazil)
- Janka Boga (1886–1963, Hungary)
- Eric Bogosian (born 1953, United States)
- George H. Boker (1823–1890, United States)
- Robert Bolt (1924–1995, England)
- Louise Bombardier (born 1953, Canada)
- Valentino Bompiani (1898–1992, Italy)
- Edward Bond (1934–2024, England)
- Leslie Bonnet (1902–1985, Wales)
- Massimo Bontempelli (1878–1960, Italy)
- Clare Boothe (1903–1987, United States)
- Wolfgang Borchert (1921–1947, Germany)
- Péter Bornemisza (c. 1535 – 1584, Hungary)
- Dion Boucicault (1820/1822–1890, Ireland/United States)
- Édouard Bourdet (1887–1945, France)
- Lucien Bourjeily (living, Lebanon)
- Edmé Boursault (1638–1701, France)
- John Griffith Bowen (1924–2019, India/England)
- Charles Boyle (1674–1731, England)
- Roger Boyle (1621–1679, Ireland/England)
- William Boyle (1853–1923, Ireland)
- Oskar Braaten (1881–1931, Norway)
- Roberto Bracco (1861–1943, Italy)
- Vitaliano Brancati (1907–1954, Italy)
- Barbarina Brand (1768–1854, England)
- Hannah Brand (1754–1821, England)
- George Brant (living, United States)
- Thomas Brasch (1945–2001, England/Germany)
- Volker Braun (born 1939, Germany)
- Bertolt Brecht (1898–1956, Germany)
- Gerbrand Adriaensz Bredero (1585–1618, Dutch Republic)
- Howard Brenton (born 1942, England)
- Manuel Bretón de los Herreros (1796–1873, Spain)
- James Bridie (1888–1951, Scotland)
- Eugène Brieux (1858–1932, France)
- Anna Beecroft Briggs (1860s–1949, Canada/United States)
- Harold Brighouse (1882–1958, England)
- Hermann Broch (1886–1951, Austria-Hungary/Austria)
- Max Brod (1884–1968) (Austria-Hungary/Czechoslovakia/Israel) in German
- Richard Brome (c. 1590–1652/1653, England)
- Arnolt Bronnen (1895–1959, Austria)
- Peter Brook (1925–2022, England)
- Kent R. Brown (living, United States)
- Robert Browning (1812–1889, England)
- Ferdinand Bruckner (1891–1958, Austria)
- Christine Brückner (1921–1996, Germany)
- David-Augustin de Brueys (1640–1723, France)
- Giordano Bruno (1548–1600, Italy)
- Georg Büchner (1813–1837, Germany)
- Leicester Silk Buckingham (1825–1867, England)
- Duke of Buckingham (1628–1687, England)
- Antonio Buero Vallejo (1916–2000, Spain)
- Mikhail Bulgakov (1891–1940, Russia)
- Edward Bullins (1935–2021, United States)
- Edward Bulwer-Lytton, 1st Baron Lytton (1803–1873, England)
- John Burgoyne (1722–1792, England)
- Frances Burney (Frances, Mme d'Arblay, 1752–1840, England)
- Frances Burney (1776–1828, England)
- Sophia Burrell (1753–1802, England)
- Leo Butler (born 1974, England)
- Jez Butterworth (born 1969, England)
- George Gordon Byron (1788–1824, England)
- Henry James Byron (1835–1884, England)

== C ==
- Gaston de Caillavet (1869–1915, France)
- Hall Caine (1853–1931, England)
- Pedro Calderón de la Barca (1600–1681, Spain)
- Sheila Callaghan (born 1973, United States)
- Callias (5th century BCE, Ancient Greece)
- Richard Cameron (born 1948, England)
- Marc Camoletti (1923–2003, France)
- Bartley Campbell (1843–1888, United States)
- David Campton (1924–2006, England)
- Albert Camus (1913–1961, France)
- Hall Caine (1853–1931, Isle of Man)
- Elias Canetti (1905–1994, Bulgaria/England) in German
- José de Cañizares (1676–1750, Spain)
- Denis Cannan (1919–2011, England)
- Cao Yu (1910–1996, China)
- Karel Čapek (1890–1938, Austria-Hungary/Czechoslovakia) in Czech
- Luigi Capuana (1839–1915, Italy)
- Alfred Capus (1858–1922, France)
- Ion Luca Caragiale (1852–1912, Romania)
- Emilio Carballido (1925–2008, Mexico)
- Louis Carette {redirect to Félicien Marceau}
- Henry Carey (1687–1743, England)
- Annibale Caro (1507–1566, Italy)
- Harriet Frances Carpenter (1868/75 – 1956, United States)
- Paul Vincent Carroll (1900–1968, Ireland/Scotland)
- R. C. Carton (1853–1928, England)
- Jim Cartwright (born 1958, England)
- William Cartwright (1611–1643, England)
- Elizabeth Cary (1585–1639, England)
- John Caryll (1625–1711, England)
- Alejandro Casona (1903–1965, Spain)
- Guillén de Castro y Bellvís (1569–1631, Spain)
- Jane Cavendish (1621–1669, England)
- Margaret Cavendish (1623–1673, England)
- Susanna Centlivre (c. 1667–1723, England)
- Miguel de Cervantes (1547–1616, Spain)
- Linda Chambers (born 1954, United States)
- George Chapman (c. 1560–1634, England)
- Katharine Hopkins Chapman (1870/72/73–1930, United States)
- Charlotte Charke (1713–1760, England)
- Mary Coyle Chase (1907–1981, United States)
- Paddy Chayefsky (1923–1981, United States)
- Anton Pavlovich Chekhov (1860–1904, Russia)
- Matilde Cherner (1833–1880, Spain)
- Andrew Cherry (1762–1812, Ireland)
- William Rufus Chetwood (died 1766, England/Ireland)
- Luigi Chiarelli (1880–1947, Italy)
- Chikamatsu Monzaemon (1653–1725, Japan)
- Jerome Chodorov (1911–2004, United States)
- Agatha Christie (1890–1976, England)
- Eugenia Chuprina (born 1971, Ukraine)
- Caryl Churchill (born 1938, England)
- Colley Cibber (1671–1757, England)
- Giovanni Battista Cini (c. 1525–1586, Italy)
- Henry Savile Clarke (1841–1893, England)
- Roy Clarke (born 1930, England)
- John Clavell (1601–1643, England)
- Paul Claudel (1868–1955, France)
- Dick Clement (born 1937, England)
- Rick Cleveland (living, United States)
- Lucy Clifford (1846–1929, England)
- Kitty Clive (1711–1785, England)
- D. L. Coburn (1938–2025, United States)
- Aston Cockayne (1608–1684, England)
- Catharine Trotter Cockburn (1679–1749, England)
- Jean Cocteau (1889–1963, France)
- Antonio Coello y Ochoa (1611–1652, Spain)
- George M. Cohan (1878–1942, United States)
- Catrin Collier (born 1948, Wales) in English
- George Colman the Elder (1732–1794, England)
- John Colton (1889–1946, United States/England)
- Padraic Colum (1881–1972, Ireland/United States)
- Rosina Conde (born 1954, Mexico)
- Pat Condell (born 1949, Ireland/England)
- William Congreve (1670–1729, England)
- Richard Conlon (born 1965, England)
- Marc Connelly (1890–1980, United States)
- Tony Connor (born 1930, England)
- Robert Taylor Conrad (1810–1858, United States)
- Michael Cook (1933–1994, Canada)
- Thomas Cooke (1703–1756, England)
- Ray Cooney (born 1932, England)
- Jacques Copeau (1879–1949, France)
- François Coppée (1842–1908, France)
- Simon Corble (living, England)
- Pierre Corneille (1606–1684, France)
- Thomas Corneille (1625–1709, France)
- Joe Corrie (1894–1968, Scotland)
- Jorge Ignacio Cortiñas (United States)
- Pietro Cossa (1830–1881, Italy)
- Georges Courteline (1858–1929, France)
- Noël Coward (1899–1973, England)
- Hannah Cowley (1743–1809, England)
- Louis O. Coxe (1918–1993, United States)
- Elizabeth, Princess Berkeley (1750–1828, England)
- Henry Thornton Craven (1818–1905, England)
- Prosper Jolyot de Crébillon (1674–1762, France)
- Martin Crimp (born 1956, England)
- Michael Cristofer (born 1945, United States)
- Francis de Croisset (1877–1937, France)
- Fernand Crommelynck (1885–1970, Belgium/France) in French
- A. J. Cronin (1896–1981, Scotland)
- A. F. Cross (1863–1940, England)
- Rachel Crothers (1878–1958, United States)
- Russel Crouse (1893–1966, United States)
- Catherine Crowe (1803–1876, England)
- Mart Crowley (1935–2020, United States)
- John Crowne (1641–1712, England)
- Nilo Cruz (born 1960, Cuba/United States) in English
- Ramón de la Cruz (1731–1794, Spain)
- Gergely Csíky (1842–1891, Hungary)
- Franz Theodor Csokor (1885–1969, Austria)
- Álvaro Cubillo de Aragón (1596–1661, Spain)
- Juan de la Cueva (c. 1550–1610, Spain)
- Tom Cullen (born 1985, Wales/England) in English
- Richard Cumberland (1732–1811, England)
- E. E. Cummings (1894–1962, United States)
- François de Curel (1854–1928, France)

== D ==
- Robert Daborne (1580?–1628) England)
- Stig Dagerman (1923–1954, Sweden)
- Andrew Dallmeyer (1945–2017, Scotland)
- Augustin Daly (1838–1899, United States)
- Clemence Dane (1888–1965, England)
- George Landen Dann (1904–1977, Australia)
- Florent Carton Dancourt (1661–1725, France)
- Clemence Dane (1888–1965, England)
- Sarah Daniels (born 1956, England)
- Gabriele d'Annunzio (1863–1938, Italy)
- Bill Dare (living, England)
- Florence Henrietta Darwin (1864–1920, England)
- Alphonse Daudet (1840–1897, France)
- William Davenant (1606–1668, England)
- Robert Davenport (fl. 1623–1639, England)
- James Kitchener Davies (1902–1952, Wales) in Welsh
- Robertson Davies (1913–1995, Canada)
- Jack Davis (1917–2000, Australia)
- Ossie Davis (1917–2005, United States)
- Owen Davis (1874–1956, United States)
- Roxann Dawson (born 1958, United States)
- Frederic Lansing Day (1886–1982) (United States)
- April De Angelis (born c. 1960, England)
- Swadesh Deepak (born 1942, India) in Hindi
- Eduardo De Filippo (1900–1984, Italy)
- Paul Dehn (1912–1976, England)
- Nalini Prava Deka (1944–2014, India)
- Thomas Dekker (c. 1572–1632, England)
- Shelagh Delaney (1939–2011, England)
- Casimir-Jean-François Delavigne (1793–1843, France)
- Barbu Delavrancea (1858–1918, Romania)
- R. F. Delderfield (1912–1972, England)
- Giambattista della Porta (1535–1615, Italy)
- Merrill Denison (1893–1975, Canada)
- Catalina D'Erzel (1897–1950, Mexico)
- Lucien Descaves (1861–1949, France)
- Jean Desmarets (1595–1676, France)
- Sugathapala de Silva (1928–2002), Ceylon/Sri Lanka) in Sinhala
- Philippe Néricault Destouches (1680–1754, France)
- Jacques Deval (1894–1972, France)
- Edward de Vere (1550–1604, England)
- Laxmi Prasad Devkota (1909–1959, Nepal)
- Juan Bautista Diamante (1625–1687, Spain)
- Lydia R. Diamond (born 1969, United States)
- Charles Dibdin (1745–1814, England)
- Thomas John Dibdin (1771–1841, England)
- Joaquín Dicenta (1863–1917, Spain)
- Denis Diderot (1713–1784, France)
- Steven Dietz (born 1958, United States)
- Salvatore Di Giacomo (1860–1934, Italy)
- Joe DiPietro (born 1961, United States)
- Robert Dodsley (1703–1764, England)
- Lodovico Dolce (1508 – c. 1568, Italy)
- Maurice Donnay (1859–1945, France)
- Ariel Dorfman (born 1942, Argentina/Chile/United States) in Spanish and English
- Earl of Dorset {redirect to Thomas Sackville, 1st Earl of Dorset}
- Tankred Dorst (1925–2017, Germany)
- Louise Doughty (born 1963, England)
- William Missouri Downs (born 1965, United States)
- Stuart Draper (born 1967, England)
- Michael Drayton (1563–1631, England)
- John Drinkwater (1882–1937, England)
- William Price Drury (1861–1949, England)
- John Dryden (1631–1700, England)
- Marin Držić (1508–1587, Republic of Ragusa) in Croatian
- Marcel Dubé (1930–2016, Canada) in French
- Charles Rivière Dufresny (1654–1724, France)
- Edmund Duggan (playwright) (1862–1938, Australia)
- Roger Martin du Gard {redirect to Martin du Gard, Roger}
- Ashley Dukes (1885–1959, England)
- Alexandre Dumas, père (1802–1870, France)
- D Underbelly (born late 1990s, United States)
- Govind Purushottam Deshpande (1938–2013, India) in Marathi
- Andrea Dunbar (1961–1990, England)
- William Duncombe (1690–1769, England)
- William Dunlap (1766–1839, United States)
- Antony Dunn (born 1973, England)
- Marc Dunn (born 1978, United States)
- Nell Dunn (born 1936, England)
- Philip Dunning (1891–1957, United States)
- Lord Dunsany (1878–1957, England/Ireland)
- Christopher Durang (1949–2024, United States)
- Marguerite Duras (1914–1996, France)
- Thomas d'Urfey (1653–1723, England)
- Friedrich Dürrenmatt (1921–1990, Switzerland) in German
- Pierre du Ryer (1606–1658, France)
- Jean Dutourd (1920–2011, France)
- Utpal Dutta (living, India) in Assamese
- Henri Duvernois (1875–1937, France)

== E ==
- Mary Emma Ebsworth (1794–1881, England)
- José Echegaray (1832–1916, Spain)
- David Edgar (born 1948, England)
- Helen Edmundson (born 1964, England)
- Margaret Edson (born 1961, United States)
- Richard Edwardes (1525–1566, England)
- Dic Edwards (born 1953, Wales) in English
- Erik Ehn (living, United States)
- Günter Eich (1907–1972, Germany
- Baron Joseph von Eichendorff (1788–1857, Germany)
- Jesse Eisenberg (born 1983, United States)
- Menna Elfyn (born 1952, Wales) in Welsh
- T. S. Eliot (1888–1965, United States/England)
- Lizzie May Elwyn (fl. 1888–1904, American)
- Juan del Encina (c. 1469–1529/1530, Spain)
- Will Eno (born 1965, United States)
- Per Olov Enquist (1934–2020, Sweden)
- Nick Enright (1950–2003, Australia)
- Eve Ensler (born 1953, United States)
- Hans Magnus Enzensberger (1929–2022, Germany)
- Epicharmus of Kos (late 6th – early 5th c. BCE, Ancient Greece)
- Paul Ernst (1866–1933, Germany)
- St. John Ervine (1883–1971, Ireland/England)
- Louis Esson (1878–1943, Australia)
- George Etherege (c. 1635–1691, England)
- Solomon Ettinger (1800/1803–1856, Poland) in Hebrew and Yiddish
- Eupolis (c. 446–411 BCE, Ancient Greece)
- Euripides (c. 485 – c. 406 BCE, Ancient Greece)
- Don Evans (1938–2003, United States)
- Charles Evered 1964-, United States)

== F ==
- Diego Fabbri (1911–1980, Italy)
- Émile Fabre (1869–1955, France)
- Jan Fabricius (1871–1964, Netherlands)
- Mildmay Fane, 2nd Earl of Westmorland (1602–1666, England)
- Herbert Farjeon (1887–1945, England)
- Joseph Jefferson Farjeon (1883–1955, England)
- George Farquhar (1677/1678–1707, England)
- Simon Farquhar (living, Scotland)
- Florence Farr (1860–1917, England)
- Graham Farrow (living, England)
- Rainer Werner Fassbinder (1945–1982, Germany)
- René Fauchois (1882–1962, France)
- Jules Feiffer (1929–2025, United States)
- Elaine Feinstein (1930–2019, England)
- Edna Ferber (1887–1968, United States)
- Lucas Fernández (1474–1542, Spain)
- Leandro Fernández de Moratín (1760–1828, Spain)
- Nicolás Fernández de Moratín (1737–1780, Spain)
- Paolo Ferrari (1822–1889, Italy)
- Lion Feuchtwanger (1884–1958, Germany)
- Georges Feydeau (1862–1921, France)
- Nathan Field (1587–1620, England)
- Henry Fielding (1707–1754, England)
- Joseph Fields (1895–1966, United States)
- Graeme Fife (living, England)
- Alex Finlayson (born 1951, United States)
- Ronald Firbank (1886–1926, England)
- Clyde Fitch (1865–1909, United States)
- George Fitzmaurice (1877–1963, Ireland)
- Gustave Flaubert (1821–1880, France)
- Martin Flavin (1883–1967, United States)
- Harvey Fierstein (born 1952, United States)
- Tim Firth (born 1964, England)
- Peter Flannery (born 1951, England)
- James Elroy Flecker (1884–1915, England)
- Richard Flecknoe (c. 1600–1678, England)
- Marieluise Fleißer (1901–1974, Germany)
- Justin Fleming (born 1953, Australia)
- Robert de Flers (1872–1927, France)
- John Fletcher (1579–1625, England)
- Lucille Fletcher (1912–2000, United States)
- Dario Fo (1926–2016, Italy)
- Ladislas Fodor (1898–1978, Hungary/West Germany)
- Antonio Fogazzaro (1842–1911, Italy)
- Denis Ivanovich Fonvizin (1744/1745–1792, Russia)
- Horton Foote (1916–2009, United States)
- Samuel Foote (1720–1777, England)
- John Ford (c. 1586 – post-1639, England)
- María Irene Fornés (1930–2018, Cuba/United States) in English
- Lars Forssell (1928–2007, Sweden)
- Ugo Foscolo (1778–1827, Italy)
- Jon Fosse (born 1959, Norway)
- Norm Foster (born 1949, Canada)
- Paul Foster (1937–2021, United States)
- Paul Foucher (1810–1875, France)
- Tim Fountain (born 1967, England)
- Charles J. Fourie (born 1965, South Africa)
- Amy Fox (born 1975, United States)
- Bruno Frank (1887–1945, Germany)
- Leonhard Frank (1882–1961, Germany/United States)
- Ian Fraser (South Africa/United States)
- Michael Frayn (born 1933, England)
- Aleksander Fredro (1793–1876, Poland)
- David French (1939–2010, Canada)
- Gustav Freytag (1816–1895, Germany)
- Erich Fried (1921–1988, Austria/England) in German
- Gertrude Friedberg (died 1989, United States)
- Bruce Jay Friedman (1930–2020, United States)
- Brian Friel (1929–2015, Ireland)
- Ketti Frings (1909–1981, United States)
- Max Frisch (1911–1991, Switzerland)
- Christopher Fry (1907–2005, England)
- Franz Fühmann (1922–1984, Germany)
- Athol Fugard (1932–2025, South Africa)
- Ulpian Fulwell (1545/1546–1584/1586, England)
- Milán Füst (1888–1967, Hungary)

== G ==
- Jeremy Gable (born 1982, United States)
- Ram Ganesh Gadkari (1885–1919, India)
- Zona Gale (1874–1938, United States)
- Ferdinando Galiani (1728–1787, Italy)
- John Galsworthy (1867–1933, England)
- Vicente Antonio García de la Huerta (1734–1787, Spain)
- Antonio García Gutiérrez (1813–1884, Spain)
- Federico García Lorca (1898–1936, Spain)
- David Garnett (1892–1981, England)
- Robert Garnier (1544–1590, France)
- David Garrick (1717–1779, England)
- George Gascoigne (1535–1577, England)
- Armand Gatti (1924–2017, France)
- Natalie Gaupp (born 1967, United States)
- John Gay (1685–1732, England)
- Michael V. Gazzo (1923–1995, United States)
- Larry Gelbart (1928–2009, United States)
- Jack Gelber (1932–2003, United States)
- Gratien Gélinas (1909–1999, Canada) in French
- Pam Gems (1925–2011, England)
- Jean Genet (1910–1986, France)
- Joel Gersmann (1942–2005, United States)
- Alice Gerstenberg (1885–1972, United States)
- Franz Xaver Karl Gewey (1764–1819, Austria)
- Michel de Ghelderode (1898–1962, Belgium) in French
- Henri Ghéon (1875–1944, France)
- Paolo Giacometti (1816–1882, Italy)
- Giuseppe Giacosa (1847–1906, Italy)
- Donato Giannotti (1492–1573, Italy)
- Melissa James Gibson (living, Canada)
- William Gibson (1914–2018, United States)
- W. S. Gilbert (1836–1911, England)
- D. B. Gilles (living, United States)
- William Gillette (1855–1937, United States)
- Frank D. Gilroy (1925–2015, United States)
- Antonio Gil y Zárate (1793–1861, Spain)
- Gina Gionfriddo (living, United States)
- Jean Giono (1895–1970, France)
- Giambattista Giraldi Cinthio (1504–1573, Italy)
- Giovanni Giraud (1776–1834, Italy)
- Jean Giraudoux (1882–1944, France)
- Lesley Glaister (born 1956, England/Scotland)
- Susan Glaspell (1876–1948, United States)
- Josef Alois Gleich (1772–1841, Austria)
- Richard Glover (1712–1785, England)
- Janusz Głowacki (1938–2007, Poland/United States) in Polish and English
- John Godber (born 1956, England)
- Johann Wolfgang von Goethe (1749–1832, Germany)
- Nikolay Vasilyevich Gogol (1809–1852, Russia)
- Abraham Haim Lipke Goldfaden (1840–1908) (Russia/United States) in Hebrew and Yiddish
- James Goldman (1927–1998, United States)
- Carlo Goldoni (1707–1793, Italy)
- Oliver Goldsmith (1728/1730–1774, Ireland/England)
- Witold Gombrowicz (1904–1969, Poland/Argentina) in Polish
- Prince Gomolvilas (born 1972, United States)
- Jeff Goode (living, United States)
- Jules Eckert Goodman (1876–1962, United States)
- Frances Goodrich (1890–1984, United States)
- Jacob Gordin (1853–1909, Ukraine/United States) in Russian and Yiddish
- Ruth Gordon (1896–1985, United States)
- Charles Gordone (1925–1995, United States)
- Catherine Gore (1798–1861, England)
- Maxim Gorky (1868–1936, Russia)
- Stephen Gosson (1554–1624, England)
- Staffan Göthe (born 1944, Sweden)
- Abraham Dov Ber Gottlober (1811–1899, Russia) in Hebrew and Yiddish
- Johann Christoph Gottsched (1700–1766, Germany)
- Olympe de Gouges (1748–1793, France)
- Carlo Gozzi (1720–1806, Italy)
- Christian Dietrich Grabbe (1801–1836, Germany)
- Ed Graczyk (born 1941/1942, United States)
- Ray Harrison Graham (born 1962, England)
- David Marshall Grant (born 1955, United States)
- George Granville, 1st Baron Lansdowne (1666–1735, England)
- Harley Granville-Barker (1877–1946, England)
- Jörg Graser (born 1951, Germany)
- Günter Grass (1927–2015, Germany)
- Jacinto Grau Delgado (1877–1958, Spain)
- Nicholas Stuart Gray (1922–1981, England)
- Simon Gray (1936–2008, England)
- Antonio Francesco Grazzini (1503–1584, Italy)
- Julien Green (1900–1998, France/United States) in French
- Paul Eliot Green (1894–1981, United States)
- Richard Greenberg (1958–2025, United States)
- Frances Nimmo Greene (1867–1937, United States)
- Graham Greene (1904–1991, England)
- Robert Greene (1558–1592, England)
- Elana Greenfield (United States)
- David Greenspan (born 1956, United States)
- Lady Augusta Gregory (1852–1932) (Ireland)
- Martin Greif (1839–1911, Germany)
- David Greig (Scotland)
- Jean-Baptiste Louis Gresset (1709–1777, France)
- Tom Griffin (1946–2018, United States)
- Trevor Griffiths (1935–2024, England)
- Franz Grillparzer (1791–1872, Austria)
- Angelina Grimké (1805–1879, United States)
- David Grimm (born 1965, United States)
- Rinne Groff (living, United States)
- Philip Gross (born 1952, England)
- Sydney Grundy (1848–1914, England)
- Andreas Gryphius (1616–1664, Germany)
- John Guare (born 1938, United States)
- Stephen Adly Guirgis (born 1965, United States)
- Sacha Guitry (1885–1957, France)
- Yesim Ozsoy Gulan (born 1972, Turkey)
- Sachin Gupta (born 1978, India) in Hindi
- Danai Gurira (born 1978, United States)
- A. R. Gurney (1930–2017, United States)
- Karl Ferdinand Gutzkow (1811–1878, Germany)

== H ==
- Peter Hacks (1928–2003, Germany)
- Ruth Hale (1908–2003, United States)
- Roger Hall (born 1939, New Zealand)
- Steven Hall (born 1975, England)
- Adam de la Halle (c. 1237 – c. 1288, France)
- Cicely Hamilton (1872–1952, England)
- Cosmo Hamilton (1871–1942, England)
- Patrick Hamilton (1904–1962, England)
- Christopher Hampton (born 1946, England)
- W. David Hancock (living, United States)
- Peter Handke (born 1942, Germany)
- William Hanley (1931–2012, United States)
- Lorraine Hansberry (1930–1965, United States)
- Haseena Moin (1941–2021, Pakistan)
- Ernst Hardt (1876–1947, Germany)
- Edward W. Hardy (born 1992, United States)
- David Hare (born 1947, England)
- Johann Hari (born 1979, Scotland)
- Tony Harrison (1937–2025, England)
- Moss Hart (1904–1961, United States)
- Bharatendu Harishchandra (1850–1885, India)
- Jonathan Harvey (born 1968, England)
- Ronald Harwood (1934–2020, South Africa/England)
- Walter Hasenclever (1890–1940, Germany)
- Christopher Hassall (1912–1963, England)
- Michael Hastings (1938–2011, England)
- Jeffrey Hatcher (living, United States)
- Richard Hathwaye (died 1604, England)
- Gerhart Hauptmann (1862–1946, Germany)
- Václav Havel (1936–2011, Czechoslovakia/Czech Republic)
- Walter Hawkesworth (c. 1573–1606, England)
- Gyula Háy (Stefan Faber, 1900–1975, Hungary/Switzerland)
- William Hayley (1745–1820, England)
- Eliza Haywood (c. 1693–1756, England)
- Colin Henry Hazlewood (1823–1875, England)
- Friedrich Hebbel (1813–1863, Germany)
- Peter Hedges (born 1962, United States)
- Herman Heijermans (1864–1924, Netherlands)
- Lillian Hellman (1905–1984, United States)
- Beth Henley (born 1952, United States)
- Karl Friedrich Hensler (1759–1825, Austria)
- John Abraham Heraud (1799–1887, England)
- A. P. Herbert (1890–1971, England)
- George Herman (1928–2019, United States)
- Amy Herzog (living, United States)
- Nigel Heseltine (1916–1995, England)
- Dorothy Hewett (1923–2002, Australia)
- John Heywood (c. 1497 – c. 1580, England)
- Thomas Heywood (early 1570s – 1641, England)
- Robert Hichens (1864–1950, England)
- Tomson Highway (born 1951, Canada)
- Wolfgang Hildesheimer (1916–1991, Germany)
- Aaron Hill (1685–1750, England)
- John Hippisley (1696–1748, England)
- Robert Hitchcock (died 1809, England)
- Prince Hoare (1755–1834, England)
- John Oliver Hobbes (Pearl Craigie, 1867–1906, United States/England)
- Rolf Hochhuth (1931–2020, Germany)
- Fritz Hochwälder (1911–1986, Austria)
- Hugo von Hofmannsthal (1874–1929, Austria)
- Ludvig Holberg (1684–1754, Norway)
- Thomas Holcroft (1745–1809, England)
- Margaret Holford (1757–1834, England)
- Arthur Holitscher (1869–1941, Hungary/Germany)
- Michael Hollinger (born 1962, United States)
- Constance Holme (1880–1955, England)
- Rupert Holmes (born David Goldstein, 1947, England/United States)
- Tom Hood (1835–1874, England)
- C. J. Hopkins (born 1961, United States)
- Frederick William Horner (1854–1933, Wales) in English
- Roy Horniman (1874–1930, England)
- Ödön von Horváth (1901–1938, Austria-Hungary)
- Laurence Housman (1865–1959, England)
- Edward Howard (1624–1712, England)
- Frederick Howard, 5th Earl of Carlisle (1748–1825, England)
- Robert Howard (1626–1698, England)
- Sidney Howard (1891–1939, United States)
- Tina Howe (1937–2023, United States)
- Frank Howson (1952–2024, Australia)
- John-Michael Howson (born 1936, Australia)
- Hroswitha of Gandersheim (c. 935 – post-973, Germany) in Latin
- Dusty Hughes (born 1947, England)
- Langston Hughes (1902–1967, United States)
- Richard Hughes (1900–1976, England)
- Victor Hugo (1802–1885, France)
- Maureen Hunter (born 1948, Canada) in English
- Samuel D. Hunter (born 1981, United States)
- Sándor Hunyady (1890–1942, Hungary)
- Angela Huth (born 1938, England)

== I ==
- Henrik Ibsen (1828–1906, Norway)
- Victor Ido (1869–1948, Netherlands)
- Elizabeth Inchbald (1753–1821, England)
- William Inge (1913–1973, United States)
- Thomas Ingelend (fl. 1560, England)
- Eugène Ionesco (1909–1994, Romania) in French and Romanian
- William Henry Ireland (1775–1835, England)
- David Ives (born 1950, United States)
- Naomi Iizuka (born 1965, United States)
- Branislava Ilić (born 1970, Serbia)

== J ==
- Donald Jack (1924–2003, England/Canada)
- Luigi Jannuzzi (born 1952, United States)
- Alfred Jarry (1873–1907, France)
- Elfriede Jelinek (born 1946, Austria)
- Ann Jellicoe (1927–2017, England)
- Ida Jenbach (fl. 1920s – 1930s, Hungary/Germany)
- Jerome K. Jerome (1859–1927, England)
- Douglas William Jerrold (1803–1857, England)
- Pamela Hansford Johnson (1912–1981, England)
- Terry Johnson (born 1955, England)
- Denis Johnston (1901–1984, Ireland)
- Arthur M. Jolly (born 1969, England)
- Henry Arthur Jones (1851–1929, England)
- Patrick Jones (born 1965, Wales) in English
- Ben Jonson (1572–1637, England)
- Rajiv Joseph (born 1974, United States)
- James Joyce (1882–1941, Ireland)

== K ==
- Georg Kaiser (1878–1945, Germany
- Kālidāsa (4th–5th c. CE, India) in Sanskrit
- Sarah Kane (1971–1999, England)
- Girish Karnad (1938–2019, India) in Kannada and English
- József Katona (1791–1830, Hungary)
- Lally Katz (born 1978, United States)
- George S. Kaufman (1889–1961, United States)
- Moisés Kaufman (born 1963, United States)
- John B. Keane (1928–2002, Ireland)
- Barrie Keeffe (1945–2019, England)
- Dennis Kelly (born 1969, England)
- Fanny Kemble (1809–1893, England)
- János Kemény (1903–1971, Romania) in Hungarian
- Adrienne Kennedy (born 1931, United States)
- Margaret Kennedy (1896–1967, England)
- James Kenney (1780–1849, England)
- William Kenrick (c. 1725–1779, England)
- Josephine Kermode (pseudonym Cushag, 1852–1937, Isle of Man)
- Joseph Kesselring (1902–1967, United States)
- Lyle Kessler (living, United States)
- Stanley Keyes (born 1948, United States)
- Henry Killigrew (1613–1700, England)
- Thomas Killigrew (1612–1683, England)
- William Killigrew (1606–1695, England)
- Thomas Kilroy (1934–2023, Ireland)
- Sidney Kingsley (1906–1995, United States)
- Julius Leopold Klein (1810–1875, Hungary/Germany) in German
- Heinrich von Kleist (1777–1811, Germany)
- Friedrich Maximilian Klinger (1752–1831, Germany)
- Václav Kliment Klicpera (1792–1859, Austria-Hungary) in Czech
- Kevin Kling (living, United States)
- Alexander Kluge (1932–2026, Germany)
- Frederick Knott (1916–2002, England)
- Oskar Kokoschka (1886–1980, Austria-Hungary, England, Switzerland) in German
- Bernard-Marie Koltès (1948–1989, France)
- Harry Kondoleon (1955–1994, United States)
- Bernard Kops (1926–2024, England)
- Apollo Korzeniowski (1820–1869, Poland)
- August von Kotzebue (1761–1819, Germany)
- Zygmunt Krasiński (1812–1859, Poland)
- Karl Kraus (1874–1936, Austria)
- Helmut Krausser (born 1964, Germany)
- Franz Xaver Kroetz (born 1946, Germany)
- Nestor Kukolnik (1809–1868, Russia)
- Hanif Kureishi (born 1954, England)
- Tony Kushner (born 1956, United States)
- Kusumagraj (1912–1999, India) in Marathi
- Thomas Kyd (1558–1594, England)

== L ==
- Neil LaBute (born 1963, United States)
- Thomas Hailes Lacy (1809–1873, England)
- Pär Lagerkvist (1891–1974, Sweden)
- Jun Lana (born 1972, Philippines)
- Robert Eyres Landor (1781–1869, England)
- Mary Lewis Langworthy (1872–1949, United States)
- Maeve Larkin (fl. 2026, England)
- Jonathan Larson (1960–1996, United States)
- Stig Larsson (born 1955, Sweden)
- Kirke La Shelle (1862–1905, United States)
- Else Lasker-Schüler (1869–1945, Germany/Palestine/Israel)
- Miklós László (1903–1973, Hungary/United States)
- Francis Lathom (1774–1832, England)
- Walter Learning (1938–2020, Canada)
- Hermine Lecomte du Noüy (1854–1915, France)
- Mary Theresa Ledóchowska (1863–1922, Austria)
- Harriet Lee (1757–1851, England)
- Kang Baek Lee (born 1947, South Korea)
- Nathaniel Lee (c. 1653–1692, England)
- Richard Nelson Lee (1806–1872, England)
- Robert E. Lee (1918–1994, United States)
- Sophia Lee (1750–1824, England)
- Mark Lemon (1809–1870, England)
- Wayne Lemon (living, United States)
- Melchior Lengyel (1880–1974, Hungary)
- Sue Lenier (born 1957, England)
- Rebecca Lenkiewicz (born 1968, England)
- Jakob Michael Reinhold Lenz (1751–1792, Russia/Livonia) in German
- Conchi León (born 1973, Mexico)
- Gotthold Ephraim Lessing (1729–1781, Germany
- Reinhard Lettau (1929–1996, Germany/United States)
- Tracy Letts (born 1965, United States)
- Ira Levin (1929–2007, United States)
- Caleb Lewis (born 1978, Australia)
- David Lewis (1682–1760, England)
- Leopold David Lewis (1828–1890, England)
- Saunders Lewis (1893–1985, Wales)
- Nell Leyshon (living, England)
- George Lillo (1691–1739, England)
- David Lindsay-Abaire (born 1969, United States)
- Romulus Linney (1930–2011, United States)
- Liz Lochhead (born 1947, Scotland)
- Oliver W. F. Lodge (1878–1955, England)
- Thomas Lodge (c. 1558–1625, England)
- Kenneth Lonergan (born 1962, United States)
- George William Lovell (1804–1878, England)
- Stephen Lowe (born 1947, England)
- William Lower (c. 1610–1662, England)
- Mina Loy (1882–1966, France/United States)
- Craig Lucas (born 1951, United States)
- Clare Boothe Luce (1903–1987, United States)
- Charles Ludlam (1943–1987, United States)
- Ken Ludwig (living, United States)
- Otto Ludwig (1813–1865, Germany)
- Joseph Lunn (1784–1863, England)
- John Lyly (c. 1553 or 1554–1606, England)

== M ==
- Ewan MacColl (James Henry Miller, 1915–1989, Scotland)
- Michael MacLennan (born 1968, Canada)
- Joseph Macleod (1903–1984, England)
- Wendy MacLeod (born 1959, United States)
- George Macropedius (1487–1558, Netherlands) in Latin
- Imre Madách (1823–1864, Hungary)
- Rosie Malek-Yonan (born 1965, Iran/United States)
- Karen Malpede (living, United States)
- David Mamet (born 1947, United States)
- Henning Mankell (1948–2015, Sweden)
- Delarivier Manley (c. 1663/1670–1724, England)
- Klaus Mann (1906–1949, Germany)
- Mona Mansour (living, United States)
- Francis Marbury (1555–1611, England)
- Frank Marcus (1928–1996, England)
- William Marchant (1923–1995, United States)
- Donald Margulies (born 1954, United States)
- Pierre de Marivaux (1688–1763, France)
- Christopher Marlowe (1564–1593, England)
- Derek Marlowe (1938–1996, England)
- Anthony Marriott (1931–2014, England)
- James Henry Marriott (1799–1886, New Zealand)
- Christabel Marshall (1871–1960, England)
- John Marston (1576–1634, England)
- John Westland Marston (1819–1890, England)
- Jane Martin, pseudonym of unknown (United States)
- Steve Martin (born 1945, United States)
- Bruce Mason (1921–1982, New Zealand)
- Paul Nicholas Mason (born 1958, Canada)
- Philip Massinger (1583–1640, England)
- Mustapha Matura (1939–2019, Trinidad)
- Robin Maugham (1916–1981, England)
- W. Somerset Maugham (1874–1965, England)
- Vladimir Mayakovsky (1893–1930, Russia/Soviet Union)
- Marius von Mayenburg (born 1972, Germany)
- Henry Mayhew (1812–1887, England)
- Jasper Mayne (1604–1672, England)
- Cary Mazer (living, United States)
- Deborah McAndrew (born 1967, England)
- Dick McBride (1928–2012, United States)
- Ellen McLaughlin (born 1957, United States)
- Tarell Alvin McCraney (born 1980, United States)
- Martin McDonagh (born 1970, Ireland)
- Greg McGee (born 1950, New Zealand)
- John McGrath (1935–2002, England)
- Reginald James MacGregor (1887–1961, England)
- Frank McGuinness (born 1953, Ireland)
- Robert McLellan (1907–1985, Scotland)
- Scott McMorrow (living, United States)
- Terrence McNally (1938–2020, United States)
- Scott McPherson (1959–1992, United States)
- Mark Medoff (1940–2019, United States)
- Charles L. Mee (born 1938, United States)
- Karl Meisl (1775–1853, Austria)
- Leonard Melfi (1932–2001, United States)
- Alex Melrose (1865–1944, Australia)
- Menander (342–291 BCE, Ancient Greece)
- David Mercer (1928–1980, England)
- Thomas Meriton (born 1638, England)
- Paul Meritt (1843–1895, England)
- William Mew (1602 – c. 1669, England) in Latin
- Adam Mickiewicz (1798–1855, Poland)
- George Middleton (1880–1967, United States)
- Thomas Middleton (1580–1627, England)
- Arthur Miller (1915–2005, United States)
- James Miller (1704–1744, England)
- Nellie Burget Miller (1875–1952, United States)
- Willy Millowitsch (1909–1999, Germany)
- Henry Hart Milman (1791–1868, England)
- Jane Milmore (1955–2020, United States)
- A. A. Milne (1882–1956, England)
- Anthony Minghella (1954–2008, England)
- Octave Mirbeau (1848–1917, France)
- Meg Miroshnik (living, United States)
- Adrian Mitchell (1932–2008, England)
- Julian Mitchell (born 1935, England)
- Mary Russell Mitford (Miss Mitford, 1787–1855, England)
- Vilhelm Moberg (1898–1973, Sweden)
- Narendra Mohan (1935–2002, India) in Hindi and Punjabi
- Caroline Moir (living, England)
- Molière (1622–1673, France)
- Ferenc Molnár (1878–1952, Hungary/United States)
- Natyaguru Nurul Momen (1908–1990, Bangladesh)
- William Thomas Moncrieff (1794–1857, England)
- Thomas Sturge Moore (1870–1944, England)
- Jose Zorrilla y Moral (1817–1893, Spain)
- Charles Langbridge Morgan (1894–1958, England)
- Elaine Morgan (1920–2013, Wales)
- Peter Morgan (born 1963, England)
- Félix Morisseau-Leroy (Moriso Lewa, 1912–1998, Haiti)
- Michael Morpurgo (born 1943, England)
- Melvyn Morrow (born 1942, Australia)
- John Mortimer (1923–2009, England)
- John Maddison Morton (1811–1891, England)
- Thomas Morton (1764–1838, England)
- Tom Morton-Smith (born 1980, England)
- Tad Mosel (1922–2008, United States)
- Itamar Moses (born 1977, United States)
- Peter Anthony Motteux (1663–1718, England)
- Dimitrios Mpogris (1890–1964, Greece)
- Sławomir Mrożek (1930–2013, Poland/France)
- Clara Mulholland (1849–1934, Ireland/England)
- Heiner Müller (1929–1995, Germany)
- Brighde Mullins (living, United States)
- Anthony Munday (c. 1560–1633, England)
- Kaj Munk (1898–1944, Denmark)
- Jimmy Murphy (living, Ireland)
- Tom Murphy (1935–2018, Ireland)
- Tommy Murphy (born 1979, Australia)
- Robert Musil (1880–1942, Austria)

== N ==
- Thomas Nabbes (1605–1641, England)
- Bill Naughton (1910–1992, England)
- John Neal (1793–1876, United States)
- Richard Nelson (born 1950, United States)
- László Németh (1901–1975, Hungary)
- Johann Nestroy (1801–1862, Austria)
- Anthony Neilson (born 1967, Scotland/England)
- Beverley Nichols (1898–1983, England)
- Peter Nichols (1927–2019, England)
- William Nicholson (born 1948, England)
- János Nyíri (1932–2002, Hungary/France)
- Jeff Noon (born 1957, England)
- Lars Norén (1944–2021, Sweden)
- Marsha Norman (born 1947, United States)
- Bruce Norris (born 1960, United States)
- Richard Norton-Taylor (born 1944, England)
- Lynn Nottage (born 1964, United States)
- Alden Nowlan (1933–1983, Canada)
- János Nyíri (1932–2002, Hungary)

== O ==
- Dan O'Brien (born 1974, United States)
- Sean O'Brien (born 1952, England)
- Seán O'Casey (1880–1964, Ireland)
- Eugene O'Neill (1888–1953, United States)
- Gerlinde Obermeier (1942–1984, Austria)
- Thomas Odell (1681–1749, England))
- Clifford Odets (1906–1963, United States)
- Aya Ogawa (born 1974, Japan/United States) in English
- Bolaji Odofin (living, Nigeria) in English
- Toshiki Okada (born 1973, Japan)
- Reggie Oliver (born 1952, England)
- Han Ong (born 1968, Philippines/United States) in English
- Onyeka (Onyeka Nubia, living, England)
- Valantina Abu Oqsa (born 1967), Palestine
- Emma Orczy (Baroness Orczy, 1865–1947, England)
- Dael Orlandersmith (living, United States)
- Joe Orton (1933–1967, England)
- John Osborne (1929–1994, England)
- Peter Oswald (born 1965, England)
- Thomas Otway (1652–1685, England)
- Gary Owen (born 1972, Wales) in English
- Rochelle Owens (born 1936, United States)
- William Henry Oxberry (1808–1852, England)
- Helen Oyeyemi (born 1984, England)

== P ==
- Jean Palaprat (1650–1721, France)
- Morris Panych (born 1952, Canada)
- Ralph Pape (died 2016, United States)
- Suzan-Lori Parks (born 1963, United States)
- Stewart Parker (1941–1988, Northern Ireland)
- Angelo Parra (living, United States)
- Gwenlyn Parry (1932–1991, Wales) in Welsh
- John Patrick (1905–1995, United States)
- Robert Patrick (1937–2023, United States)
- Nick Payne (born 1984, England)
- George Peele (1556–1596, England)
- Borislav Pekić (1930–1992, Yugoslavia/England) in Serbian
- Charles Reece Pemberton (1790–1840, Wales/England)
- Joachim Perinet (1763–1816, Austria)
- Matthew Perry (born 1969, United States)
- Tyler Perry (born 1969, United States)
- Stephen Phillips (1864–1915, England)
- Eden Phillpotts (1862–1960, England)
- Arthur Wing Pinero (1855–1934, England)
- Harold Pinter (1930–2008, England)
- Luigi Pirandello (1867–1936, Italy)
- Mary Pix (1666–1709, England)
- Safet Plakalo (1959–2015, Yugoslavia/Bosnia and Herzegovina)
- James Planché (1796–1880, England)
- Alan Plater (1935–2010, England)
- Plautus (c. 254–184 BCE, Ancient Rome)
- Ulrich Plenzdorf (1934–2007, Germany)
- Isaac Pocock (1782–1835, England)
- Suman Pokhrel (born 1967, Nepal)
- Elizabeth Polack (fl. 1830s, England)
- Ernő Polgár (1954–2018, Hungary)
- Alan Pollock (born 1962, England)
- Sharon Pollock (1936–2021, Canada)
- Elizabeth Polwheele (c.1651–c.1691, England)
- John Poole (1786–1872, England)
- Cora Scott Pond Pope (1856–?, United States)
- Henry Porter (died 1599, England)
- Gordon Porterfield (living, United States)
- Suzanne Portnoy (born 1961, England)
- Dennis Potter (1935–1994, England)
- Reinaldo Povod (1960–1994, United States)
- Samuel Jackson Pratt (1749–1814, England)
- Lucy Prebble (born 1980, England)
- Otto Prechtler (1813–1881, Austria)
- Thomas Preston (1537–1598, England)
- Nancy Price (1880–1970, England)
- J. B. Priestley (1894–1984, England)
- Bryan Procter (Barry Cornwall, 1787–1874, England)
- Stanisław Przybyszewski (1868–1927, Poland)
- Alexander Pushkin (1799–1837, Russia)

== Q ==
- Abu Khalil Qabbani (1835–1902, Syria)
- Philippe Quinault (1635–1688, France)

== R ==
- David Rabe (born 1940, United States)
- Jean Racine (1639–1699, France)
- Akbar Radi (1939–2007, Iran)
- Ferdinand Raimund (1790–1836, Austria
- Nina Raine (living, England)
- Mohan Rakesh (1925–1972, India) in Hindi
- Adam Rapp (born 1968, United States)
- Nina Rapi (born 1962, Greece)
- John Rastell (John Rastall, c. 1475–1536, England)
- Lutz Rathenow (born 1952, Germany)
- Terence Rattigan (1911–1977, England)
- Simon Raven (1927–2001, England)
- Edward Ravenscroft (c. 1654–1707, England)
- James Reaney (1926–2008, Canada)
- Keith Reddin (born 1956, United States)
- Frederic Reynolds (1764–1841, England)
- Renée (1929–2023, New Zealand)
- Yasmina Reza (born 1959, France)
- William Barnes Rhodes (1772–1826, England)
- Alfred Bate Richards (1820–1876, England)
- Erwin Riess (1957–2023, Austria)
- Arnold Ridley (1896–1984, England)
- Philip Ridley (born 1964, England)
- Lawrence Riley (1896–1974, United States)
- Rainer Maria Rilke (1875–1926, Austro-Hungarian Empire/Switzerland)
- José Rivera (born 1955, Puerto Rico) in English
- Eigra Lewis Roberts (born 1939, Wales) in Welsh
- Thomas William Robertson (1829–1871, England)
- Lennox Robinson (1886–1958, Ireland)
- Rony Robinson (born 1940, England)
- David Robson (born 1966, United States)
- Isaac Rosenberg (1890–1918, England)
- Jack Rosenthal (1931–2004, England)
- Bert V. Royal (born 1977, United States)
- Hossein Rajabian (born 1984, Iran)
- Kenneth G. Ross (born 1941, Australia)
- Edmond Rostand (1868–1918, France)
- Friederike Roth (born 1948, Germany)
- Samuel Rowley (died c. 1633, England)
- William Rowley (c. 1585–1626, England)
- Gillian Rubinstein (Lian Hearn, born 1942, England/Australia)
- David Rudkin (born 1936, England)
- Paul Rudnick (born 1957, United States)
- John Ruganda (1941–2007, Uganda)
- Sarah Ruhl (born 1974, United States)
- Katherine Rundell (born 1967, England)
- Willy Russell (born 1974, England)
- Nelson Rodrigues (1912–1980, Brazil)
- Royce Ryton (1924–2009, England)

== S ==
=== Sa–Se ===
- Suhayl Saadi (born 1961, England/Scotland)
- Hans Sachs (1494–1576, Germany)
- Nelly Sachs (1891–1970, Sweden)
- Peter Sagal (born 1965, United States)
- Bhisham Sahni (1915–2003, India) in Hindi
- Balkrishna Sama (1903–1981, Nepal)
- Tori Sampson (born 20th century, United States)
- Florencio Sánchez (1875–1910, Uruguay)
- Francesca Sanders (living, United States)
- Sally Sara (born 1971, Australia)
- William Saroyan (1908–1981, United States)
- Jean-Paul Sartre (1905–1980, France)
- Geneviève Savalette (1735–1795, France)
- Mark Scharf (born 1956, United States)
- Georges Schehadé (1905–1989, Lebanon) in French
- Robert Schenkkan (born 1953, United States)
- Friedrich Schiller (1759–1805, Germany)
- Guillermo Schmidhuber (born 1943, Mexico)
- Arno Schmidt (1914–1979, Germany)
- Éric-Emmanuel Schmitt (born 1960, Belgium/France) in French
- Arthur Schnitzler (1862–1931, Austria)
- Werner Schwab (1958–1994, Austria)
- György Schwajda (1943–2010, Hungary)
- William Matthew Scott (1893–1964, England)
- Sandra Seaton (living, United States)
- David Sedaris (born 1956, United States)
- Seneca the Younger (c. 4 BCE – CE 65, Ancient Rome) in Latin
- Ferhan Şensoy (1951–2021, Turkey)

=== Sg–Sr ===
- Anthony Shaffer (1926–2001, England)
- Peter Shaffer (1926–2016, England)
- William Shakespeare (1564–1616, England)
- Ntozake Shange (1948–2018, United States)
- John Patrick Shanley (born 1950, United States)
- Partap Sharma (1939–2011, India)
- Harriette Lucy Robinson Shattuck (1850–1937, United States)
- Lionel Shave (1888–1954, Australia)
- George Bernard Shaw (1856–1950, Ireland/England)
- Wallace Shawn (born 1943, United States)
- Rob Shearman (born 1970, England)
- Owen Sheers (born 1974, Wales) in English
- Edward Sheldon (1886–1946, United States)
- Jane Shepard (born 1958, United States)
- Sam Shepard (1943–2017, United States)
- Richard Brinsley Sheridan (1751–1816, Ireland/England)
- Jonathan Marc Sherman (born 1968, United States)
- R. C. Sherriff (1896–1975, England)
- Robert E. Sherwood (1896–1955, United States)
- George Shiels (1881–1949, Ireland)
- Christopher R. Shimmin (1870–1933, Isle of Man)
- Christopher Shinn (born 1975, United States)
- Rick Shiomi (born 1947, Canada)
- Dora Adele Shoemaker (1873–1962, United States)
- Del Shores (born 1957, United States)
- Larry Shue (1946–1985, United States)
- Nicky Silver (living, United States)
- Lazarre Seymour Simckes (born 1937, United States)
- Neil Simon (1927–2018, United States)
- Eric Simonson (born 1960, United States)
- Libby Skala (1967–2019, United States)
- Bernard Slade (1930–2019, Canada)
- Juliusz Słowacki (1809–1849, Poland)
- Roy Smiles (living, England)
- Anna Deavere Smith (born 1950, United States)
- Evan Smith (living, United States)
- Amelia Solar de Claro (1836–1915, Chile)
- Sophocles (c. 497/496–406/405 BCE, Ancient Greece)
- Aaron Sorkin (born 1961, United States)
- Alfred Soultan (born 1946, Hungary/United States)
- Gabrielle Soumet (1814–1886, France)
- Wole Soyinka (born 1934, Nigeria)
- Ron Sparks (born 1977, Canada)
- Biljana Srbljanović (born 1970, Yugoslavia/Serbia)

=== St–Sz ===
- Adrian Consett Stephen (1894–1918, Australia)
- Simon Stephens (born 1971, England)
- Shelagh Stephenson (born 1955, England)
- Polly Stenham (born 1986, England)
- Christopher Stollery (living, Australia)
- Tom Stoppard (1937–2025, Czechoslovakia/England)
- David Storey (1933–2017, England)
- August Stramm (1874–1915, Germany)
- John Strand (living, United States)
- Botho Strauß (born 1944, Germany)
- August Strindberg (1849–1912, Sweden)
- Sara Stridsberg (born 1972, Sweden)
- Kelly Stuart (living, United States)
- Preston Sturges (1898–1959, United States)
- Abhi Subedi (born 1945, Nepal)
- Robert B Suda (born 1978, Hungary/England)
- Patrick Süskind (born 1949, Germany)
- András Sütő (1927–2006, Romania) in Hungarian
- Alfred Sutro (1863–1933, England)
- Caridad Svich (born 1963, United States)
- Robin Swados (born 1953, United States)
- Jeffrey Sweet (born 1950, United States)
- John Millington Synge (1871–1909, Ireland)
- Dezső Szomory (Moshe Weisz, 1869–1944, Hungary)

== T ==
- George Tabori (1914–2007, Hungary/England/United States/Germany) in English and German
- Rabindranath Tagore (1861–1941, India) in English
- Habib Tanvir (1923–2009, India) in Urdu
- Jean Tardieu (1903–1995, France)
- Henry Taylor (1800–1886, England)
- Bernard J. Taylor (living, South Africa/United States)
- Samuel Taylor (1912–2000, United States)
- Telecleides (fl. 440s BCE, Ancient Greece)
- Vijay Tendulkar (1928–2008, India) in Marathi
- Terence (c. 195/185 – c. 159 BCE, Ancient Rome)
- Tian Han (1898–1968, China)
- Louie Myfanwy Thomas (1908–1968, Wales) in Welsh
- Ernest Thompson (born 1949, United States)
- Judith Thompson (born 1954, Canada)
- A. A. Thomson (1894–1968, England)
- Ludwig Tieck (1773–1853, Germany)
- Harry Tighe (1887–1946, Australia)
- Dion Titheradge (1889–1934, Australia/England/United States)
- Lily Tobias (1887–1984, Wales) in English
- Stephen Tobolowsky (born 1951, United States)
- Franz Xaver Told (1792–1849), Austria
- Ernst Toller (1893–1939, Germany)
- Francis Tolson (died 1745/1746, England)
- Colorado Tolston, pseudonym of T. James Belich (born 1976, United States)
- Zlatko Topčić (born 1955, Bosnia and Herzegovina)
- Bartolomé de Torres Naharro (c. 1485 – c. 1530, Spain/Italy)
- Miles Tredinnick (born 1955, England)
- Catherine Tregenna (living, Wales/England) in English
- Kurt Tucholsky (1890–1935, Germany)

== U ==
- Anne Undeland (United States)
- Nicholas Udall (1504–1556, England)
- Alfred Uhry (born 1936, United States)
- Rodolfo Usigli (1905–1979, Mexico)
- Ken Urban (born 1974, United States)
- Tracie Chima Utoh (fl. 2008, Nigeria)

== V ==
- Alfonso Vallejo (1943–2021, Spain)
- Alexander Vampilov (1937–1972, Soviet Union)
- Jaco Van Dormael (born 1957, Belgium)
- John Vanbrugh (1664–1726, England)
- John William Van Druten (1901–1957, England)
- Jean-Claude van Itallie (1936–2021, Belgium/United States)
- Billy Van Zandt (born 1957, United States)
- Johann von Vásáry (1899–1963, Hungary)
- Lope de Vega (1562–1635, Spain)
- Richard Vennar (1564–1615, England)
- Gil Vicente (c. 1465 – c. 1536, Portugal)
- Gore Vidal (1925–2012, United States)
- András Visky (born 1957, Romania) in Hungarian
- Paula Vogel (born 1951, United States)
- François-Marie Voltaire (1694–1788, France)
- Joost van den Vondel (1587–1679, Netherlands)

== W ==
- Heinrich Leopold Wagner (1747–1779, Germany)
- Stephen Wakelam (living, England)
- Derek Walcott (1930–2017, Saint Lucia)
- Craig Walker (born 1960, Canada)
- George F. Walker (born 1947, Canada)
- Naomi Wallace (born 1960, United States)
- Martin Walser (1927–2023, Germany)
- Robert Walser (1878–1956, Switzerland) in German
- Agnes Walsh (born 1950, Canada)
- Saadallah Wannous (1941–1997, Syria)
- Anne Washburn (living, United States)
- Dale Wasserman (1914–2008, United States)
- Wendy Wasserstein (1950–2006, United States)
- Keith Waterhouse (1929–2009, England)
- John Webster (1580 – c. 1634, England)
- Frank Wedekind (1864–1918, Germany)
- Peter Weiss (1916–1982, Germany)
- Louise Welsh (born 1965, England/Scotland)
- Franz Werfel (1890–1945, Austrian Empire/Germany/United States)
- Henri van Wermeskerken (1882–1937, Netherlands)
- Timberlake Wertenbaker (born 1951, United States/England)
- Arnold Wesker (1932–2016, England)
- Patricia Wettig (born 1951, United States)
- Peter Whelan (1931–2014, England)
- John Whiting (1917–1963, England)
- Adolf von Wilbrandt (1837–1911, Germany)
- Oscar Wilde (1850–1900, Ireland/England)
- Thornton Wilder (1897–1975, United States)
- Adolfo Wilhelmy (1887–1958, Mexico)
- Emlyn Williams (1905–1987, Wales) in English
- Heathcote Williams (1941–2017, England)
- Richard Bryn Williams (1902–1981, Wales) in Welsh
- Roger Williams (born 1974. Wales) in English and Welsh
- Tennessee Williams (1911–1983, United States)
- David Williamson (born 1942, Australia)
- Arthur Wilson (1595–1652, England)
- August Wilson (1945–2005, United States)
- Laurence Wilson (born 1970, England)
- Lanford Wilson (1937–2011, United States)
- Tracey Scott Wilson (born 1966, United States)
- Leah Nanako Winkler (born 1985, Japan/United States)
- Nicholas Wright (born 1940, United Kingdom)
- Stanisław Ignacy Witkiewicz {Witkacy} (1885–1939, Poland)
- Karol Wojtyła {Pope John Paul II} (1920–2005, Poland)
- Charles Wood (1932–2020, Guernsey/England)
- Linda Woolverton (born 1952, United States)
- William Wycherley (c. 1641–1716, England)
- Stanisław Wyspiański (1869–1907, Poland)
- Laurence Mark Wythe (born 1974, England)

== Y ==
- Maya Arad Yasur (born 1976, Israel)
- William Butler Yeats (1865–1939, Ireland)
- Benjamin Yeoh (born 1978, England)
- Chay Yew (謝耀, living, Singapore/United States)
- Dinara Yuldasheva (born 1952, Uzbekistan)

== Z ==
- Gabriela Zapolska (1860–1921, Poland)
- Berhanu Zerihun (1933/1934–1987, Ethiopia)
- Paul Zindel (1936–2003, United States)
- Émile Zola (1840–1902, France)
- José Zorrilla (1817–1893, Spain)
- Carl Zuckmayer (1896–1977, Germany/United States/Austria)
- Jerzy Żuławski (1874–1915, Poland)
- Stefan Zweig (1881–1942, Austria)

== See also ==
- List of Azerbaijani dramatists and playwrights
- List of Bosnian playwrights
- List of British playwrights since 1950
- List of Canadian playwrights
- List of French playwrights
- List of German playwrights
- List of Irish dramatists
- List of Jewish American playwrights
- List of Romanian playwrights
- List of Slovenian playwrights
- List of playwrights from the United States
- List of early-modern British women playwrights
