= Dinara (given name) =

Dinara دينارا
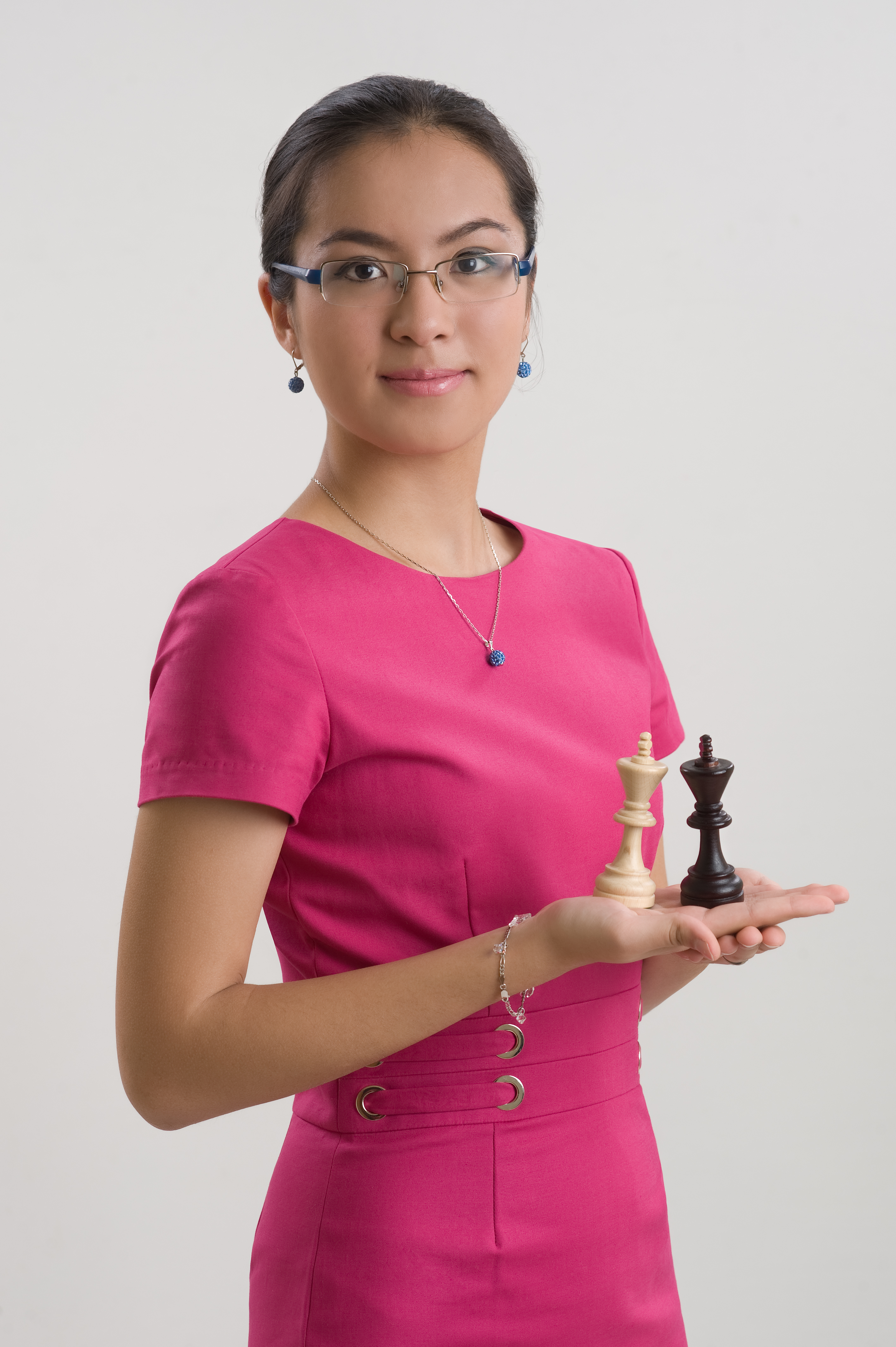
- Kazakh chess player Dinara Saduakassova
- Gender: Female
- Language: Kazakh

Origin
- Meaning: «expensive»
- Region of origin: Turkic

Other names
- Related names: Dinora

Dinara (or Arabic: دينارا) is a Kazakh and Kyrgyz feminine given name, which means «expensive».

== Given name ==
- Dinara Aidarova (born 1963), Azerbaijani volleyball player
- Dinara Akulova (born 1964), Kyrgyzstani singer
- Dzinara Alimbekava (born 1996), Kazakhstan-born Belarusian biathlete
- Dinara Alieva (born 1980), Azerbaijani and Russian soprano
- Dinara Asanova (1942–1985), Kyrgyzstani-Soviet film director
- Dinara Dikambayeva (born 1982), Kazakhstani ice hockey player
- Dinara Drukarova (born 1976), Russian actress
- Dinara Gimatova (born 1986), Azerbaijani gymnast
- Dinara Kasko (born 1988), Ukrainian baker and media figure
- Dinara Khaziyeva (born 1986), Canadian chess player
- Dinara Kulibaeva (born 1967), Kazakh billionaire heiress, businesswoman
- Dinara Nurdbayeva (born 1976), Uzbekistani ice dancer
- Dinara Rakhimbaeva (born 1995), Kazakh model and blogger
- Dinara Ravshanbekova (born 1999), Uzbekistani gymnast
- Dinara Sadretdinova (born 1976), Russian actress and TV presenter
- Dinara Saduakassova (born 1996), Kazakh chess player
- Dinara Safina (born 1986), Russian tennis player
- Dinara Uzbekova (1933–2020), Russian pharmacologist and professor
- Dinara Wagner (born 1999), Kalmyk-born German chess player
- Dinara Yuldasheva (born 1952), Uzbek playwright
- Dinara Zhorobekova, Kyrgyzstani student
