= 1691 in literature =

This article contains information about the literary events and publications of 1691.

== Events ==
- March 17 – The Athenian Mercury begins twice-weekly publication in London.
- May 5 – Bernard Le Bovier de Fontenelle becomes a member of the Académie française.

== New books ==
=== Prose ===
- Adrien Baillet – La vie de monsieur Descartes
- Barbara Blaugdone – An Account of the Travels, Sufferings & Persecutions of Barbara Blaugdone. Given forth as a testimony to the Lord's power, and for the encouragement of Friends
- Gerard Langbaine – An Account of the English Dramatic Poets
- Maximilien Misson – Nouveau voyage d'Italie
- Sir Dudley North – Discourses upon Trade
- The Kingdom of Ireland
- Sor Juana Inés de la Cruz – Respuesta a Sor Filotea de la Cruz

=== Drama ===
- Anonymous – The Braggadocio, or Bawd Turn'd Puritan
- John Bancroft – Edward III, with the Fall of Mortimer, Earl of March
- Pedro Calderon de la Barca – Céfalo y Pocris
- David-Augustin de Brueys & Jean Palaprat – Le Muet
- John Dryden – King Arthur, or the British Worthy (a "semi-opera" with music by Henry Purcell)
- Thomas d'Urfey – Love for Money
- Joseph Harris – The Mistakes
- William Mountfort – Greenwich Park
- Archibald Pitcairne and others – The Phanaticks (first published as The Assembly, or Scotch Reformation, posthumously as "by a Scots Gentleman", 1722)
- Jean Racine – Athalie
- John Smith (probable author – issued anonymously) – Win Her and Take Her, or Old Fools will be Medling: a comedy
- Thomas Southerne – The Wives Excuse
- John Wilson – Belphegor, or the Marriage of the Devil published

== Births ==
- February 3 – George Lillo, English dramatist and actor (died 1739)
- February 27 – Edward Cave, English printer and publisher (died 1754)
- April 9 – Johann Matthias Gesner, German classicist (died 1761)
- October 18 – John Leland, English theologian (died 1766)

== Deaths ==
- June 26 – John Flavel, English Presbyterian religious writer (born 1627)
- July 30 – Daniel Georg Morhof, German writer and critic (born 1639)
- October 8 – Thomas Barlow, English religious writer and bishop (born 1609)
- October 10 – Isaac de Benserade, French poet (born 1613)
- December 8 – Richard Baxter, English Puritan religious leader and writer (born 1615)
- Probable year of death – Samuel Pordage, English poet and cleric (born 1633)
