= James Belich =

James Belich may refer to:

- James Belich (historian) (born 1956), New Zealand historian
- Sir Jim Belich (1927–2015), mayor of Wellington
- T. James Belich (born 1976), American playwright and actor
