= Gerlinde Obermeir =

Austrian writer

Gerlinde Obermeir (1942–1984) was an Austrian feminist writer known for her critiques on mental health care.

She wrote I Will Not and San Francisco, of Course (or Positively San Francisco as she herself translated the title).

Obermeir has been credited by some critics with mystical insights in her writing. This perhaps makes too much of a visit to India. In 1976 she spent three weeks in India with Swami Paramananda Saraswati. This visit is detailed in Malachi O'Doherty's memoir, I Was A Teenage Catholic. It seems more appropriate to read her explorations of madness as relating to a celebration of anarchic thinking than as grounded in Eastern religion.

She died by suicide in her early forties in Vienna in 1984.

== See also ==
- List of dramatists
