= 1739 in literature =

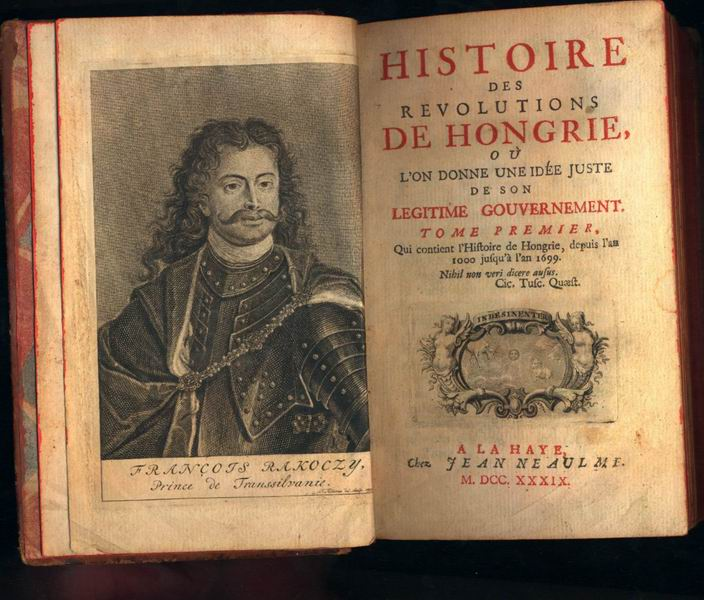
History of the Revolutions in Hungary, 1739

This article contains information about the literary events and publications of 1739.

== Events ==
- January 16 – George Frideric Handel's oratorio Saul is first performed at the King's Theatre, Haymarket, London.
- February 9 – The Scots Magazine first appears.
- February 17 – George Whitefield first preaches in the open air, to miners at Kingswood, South Gloucestershire, England.
- March 16 – Henry Brooke's drama Gustavus Vasa becomes the first play banned under the Licensing Act 1737.
- April – John Wesley first preaches in the open air, at Whitefield's invitation.
- November – The Champion (periodical) is launched, with Henry Fielding (under the name Captain Hercules Vinegar) as editor.
- unknown date – The first Bible in the Estonian language, Piibli Ramat, translated by Anton thor Helle, is published.

== New books ==
=== Prose ===
- Penelope Aubin – A Collection of Entertaining Histories and Novels
- John Campbell – The Travels and Adventures of Edward Bevan, Esq., formerly a merchant in London
- Elizabeth Carter
  - Examination of Mr. Pope's Essay on Man (translation of De Crousaz's Examen de l'essai de Monsieur Pope sur l'homme)
  - Sir Isaac Newton's Philosophy Explain'd for the Use of Ladies (translation of Algarotti's Newtonianismo per le donne)
- Philip Doddridge – The Family Expositor
- Richard Glover – London
- David Hume (anonymously) – A Treatise of Human Nature (issued late 1738 but dated this year)
- William Law – The Grounds and Reasons of Christian Regeneration
- John Mottley (as Elijah Jenkins) – Joe Miller's Jests; or, the Wits Vade-Mecum
- Robert Nugent (attributed) – An Epistle to Sir Robert Walpole
- John Oldmixon – The History of England during the Reigns of Henry VIII, Edward VI, Queen Mary, Queen Elizabeth
- Laetitia Pilkington – The Statues
- Samuel Richardson – Aesop's Fables
- Elizabeth Singer Rowe – Miscellaneous Works
- Thomas Sheridan – The Satires of Juvenal Translated
- Joseph Trapp – The Nature, Folly, Sin, and Danger, of Being Righteous Over-much (against George Whitefield)
- Voltaire
  - De la Gloire, ou entretien avec un Chinois
  - Conseils a M. Helvetius
- Isaac Watts – The World to Come
- George Whitefield – A Continuation of the Reverend Mr. Whitefield's Journal
- Paul Whitehead – Manners

=== Drama ===
- Daniel Bellamy – Miscellanies in Prose and Verse
- Henry Brooke – Gustavus Vasa
- Anthony Brown – The Fatal Retirement
- Henry Carey – Nancy (opera)
- Thomas Cooke – The Mournful Nuptials (not acted)
- David Mallet – Mustapha
- James Miller – An Hospital for Fools
- Edward Phillips – Britons, Strike Home
- William Shirley – The Parricide
- James Thomson – Edward and Eleonora

=== Poetry ===
- Moses Browne – Poems
- Mary Collier – The Woman's Labour: an epistle to Mr Stephen Duck
- Mikhail Lomonosov – Ode on the Taking of Khotin from the Turks
- Robert Nugent
  - An Ode on Mr. Pulteney
  - An Ode, to His Royal Highness on His Birthday
  - Odes and Epistles
- Jonathan Swift – Verses on the Death of Dr. Swift
- John Wesley – Hymns and Sacred Poems

== Births ==
- January – Twm o'r Nant, Welsh playwright and poet (died 1810)
- August 31 – Johann Augustus Eberhard, German theologian and philosopher (died 1809)
- November 20 – Jean-François de la Harpe, French critic (died 1803)
- Unknown dates
  - Hugh Kelly, Irish-born dramatist and poet (died 1777)
  - Sophronius of Vratsa, Bulgarian writer and clergyman, early figure in the Bulgarian National Revival (died 1813)

== Deaths ==
- June 20 – Edmond Martène, French historian (born 1654)
- July 25 – Johann Christoph Wolf, German Hebrew scholar and bibliographer (born 1683)
- September 4 – George Lillo, English dramatist and actor (born 1691)
- October 18 – António José da Silva, Brazilian dramatist (born 1705)
- probable – Liu Zhi (劉智), Chinese Muslim scholar (born c. 1660)
