= Yeşim Özsoy Gülan =

Turkish actress, director and playwright

- Born: 28 February 1972 (age 54); Istanbul, Turkey
- Occupations: actress, director and playwright
- Years active: 1998-present

Yeşim Özsoy Gülan (born in Istanbul 1972) is a Turkish actress, director and playwright. She is the founder and artistic Director of VeDST Theatre at GalataPerform located in Galata, Istanbul.

She studied at Robert College and then at Bogazici University. She got her master from Northwestern University. Ozsoy Gulan has written, directed and produced ten different productions in Istanbul, New York and in Europe all of which were mostly written and directed by Özsoy Gülan. Her piece “House-a Cacophonic Play”, has been presented at New Plays from Europe Theatre Biennale New Plays from Europe (Neue Stücke aus Europa) is the only large-scale international festival dedicated exclusively to productions of contemporary plays in their original languages.

== Plays ==
Yesim Ozsoy Gulan's play are: ”Play Alla Turca” (2000), “Year 2084″ (2001), “House-a Cacophonic Play” (2003), “Limping Tales from İstanbul” (2004), “Playback”(2005), “Last World”(2006), “The Notary”(2008), “Third Universe”, “Turkiye-Almanya 0-0″ (2010) for which Özsoy Gülan resided in and worked for Wiesbaden State Theaters in Germany for the repertoire.

== Awards ==
“Century’s Love” was nominated in 5 different categories for 2011 Theatre Awards of Istanbul and won “Best Female Performer”. Some other awards include: 2006 Afife Jale Theatre Awards for Best Playwright for “Limping Tales from İstanbul”, Lions Public Jury Award for Most Original Play for “Third Universe”.

Her theater group is called: "...and the Other Things" with initials in Turkish VEDST was formed in 2002 in Istanbul. It was called Home Works Theater when it was first founded in New York City in 2000. Her last play “It was a Calm and Chilly Morning the Day I Started my Journey” premiered at the 18th Istanbul International Theatre Festival. Ozsoy Gulan is currently teaching Contemporary Theater at Bogazici University Istanbul.
