= Ralph Pape =

American playwright

Ralph Pape (1946/1947 – March 27, 2016) was an American playwright best known for Say Goodnight, Gracie (1978), Soap Opera (1984) and Hearts Beating Faster (1997).

== Theater ==
Say Goodnight, Gracie was produced by Douglas Urbanski and ran off-Broadway for 400 performances in 1978 and was staged in 1979 by Chicago's Steppenwolf Theatre Company, also produced by Douglas Urbanski with Austin Pendleton directing a cast headed by John Malkovich, Joan Allen and Glenne Headly. The comedy-drama captures a generation at a turning point in 1976. Five members of the first Television Generation plan to attend their high school reunion. In New York, they gather in an East Village apartment where they discuss their dreams, insecurities, past events and favorite TV shows. As they head toward age 30. they attempt to figure out what to do with their lives.

The first draft of Hearts Beating Faster was commissioned by the Steppenwolf Theatre as part of their new plays project in 1991. His other plays include Girls We Have Known (1984), Warm and Tender Love (1984) and Beyond Your Command (1988). Gracie, Soap Opera and Girls We Have Known have each had over 200 productions in the United States, Canada and Australia. Mel Gussow, in The New York Times, reviewed the 1992 New York production of Soap Opera, directed by Elizabeth Franzen:

In Soap Opera, Ralph Pape's one-act play, the actress Julienne Greer looks directly at the audience and says with total conviction, "I could have just about any man I want these days," and adds, "It's great." Formerly ignored by her office mates, the character has forcibly changed her image. She is proof that self-confidence is the first step to altering the attitude of others. Ms. Greer exudes sensual awareness as she tells the story of her new life of carnality. That story is the first of three interwoven narratives in Mr. Pape's play. The others in this so-called triologue are delivered by her lover and another woman. As the three take turns addressing the audience -- and never make contact with one another onstage -- a romance unfolds. At first, the play seems straightforward. Gradually it becomes devious and finally it veers toward melodrama. In a play in which every earlier step is carefully plotted and orchestrated, the end is too wide a leap. But until that point, Mr. Pape (author of the play Say Goodnight, Gracie) is, like his heroine, in sure command of himself, leading theatergoers deeper into his playwright's snare. The cast and the director, Elizabeth Franzen, are his knowing accomplices in this tale of desire gone awry, with Shannon Malone as an artist attracted to both sexes; Gerard J. Schneider as a mechanic who finds himself the center of womanly attention, and, particularly, Ms. Greer. She creates a corrosive portrait of a wallflower turned black widow spider, playing upon male self-doubts and luxuriating in her own vanity. In this Soap Opera, all appearances are deceptive.

== Television ==
In 1983, Say Goodnight, Gracie was adapted by the author for a 90-minute teleplay which was seen on Chicago's PBS affiliate WTTW with the original Steppenwolf cast of Joan Allen, Jeff Perry, Glenne Headly, Francis Guinan and John Malkovich.

== Awards ==
Pape received a 1994 Emmy for his TV adaptation of Say Goodnight, Gracie.

Girls We Have Known was a runner-up in Actors Theatre of Louisville's Great American Play Contest. As a result, the theatre commissioned Warm and Tender Love and Soap Opera. Hearts Beating Faster prompted New York's Berrilla Kerr Foundation to honor Pape with a five-figure award "to acknowledge the contribution made to the contemporary American theatre."

In 2007, Pape was selected as one of America's top 50 playwrights to watch. This was featured in a cover story by The Dramatist, the bi-monthly magazine published by the Dramatists Guild of America.

== Books ==
Scenes and monologues extracted from Pape's plays have been published in the following books:

- Great Scenes And Monologues For Actors (St. Martin's Press, 1998)
- Duo!: Best Scenes for the 90's (Applause Theatre Books, 1995)
- The Actor's Book of Contemporary Stage Monologues (Penguin Books, 1987)
- The Actor's Scenebook (Bantam Books, 1984)

== Plays ==
- Say Goodnight Gracie (1979)
- Girls We Have Known (1984)
- Warm And Tender Love (1984)
- Soap Opera (1984)
- Beyond Your Command (1988)
- Hearts Beating Faster (1997)

== Death ==
Ralph A. Pape died at the age of 69 on Sunday, March 27, 2016, at his New York home.

== See also ==
- List of playwrights
