= Dinara Zhorobekova =

Kyrgyzstan Student

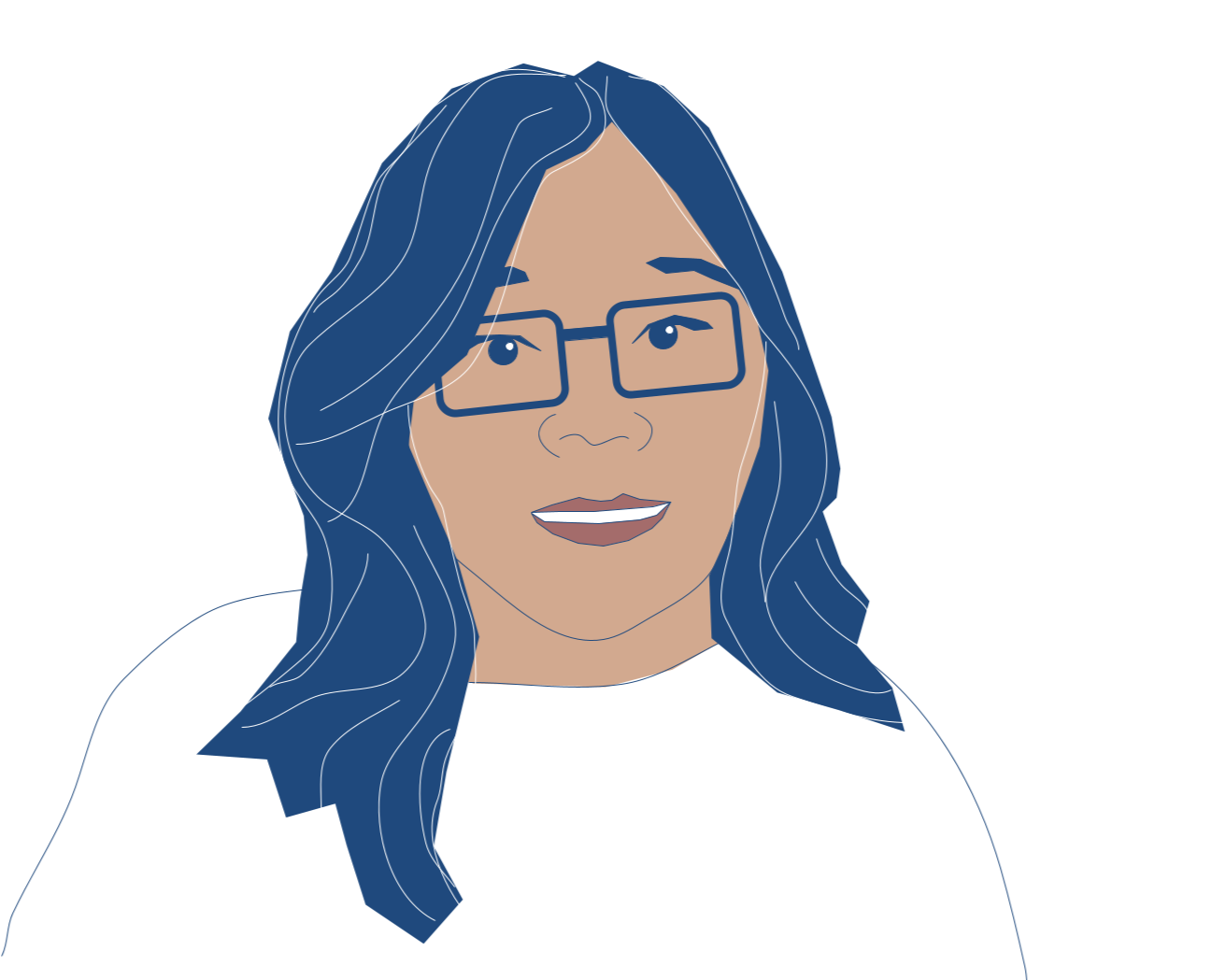

Dinara Zhorobekova (Kazakh: Динара Жоробекова) is a Kyrgyz student who represented Turkey at the 2013 G20 Summit.

She is honoured in BBC'S 100 Women in 2013.
