= Maximilien Misson =

French writer and traveller

Nouveau Voyage d'Italie, 1724

Francis Maximilian Misson, originally François Maximilien Misson (c.1650 – 12 January 1722), was a French writer and traveller. Born in Lyon, he fled France at the revocation of the Edict of Nantes in 1685 and settled in Britain. He travelled through Italy during 1687 and 1688, and in 1691 published the Nouveau voyage d'ltalie, which was to be the standard travel guide to Italy for the following fifty years. In 1698 he published his second work Mémoires et observations faites par un voyageur en Angleterre, and in 1708 his final book A new voyage to the East-Indies.
