= Valantina Abu Oqsa =

Palestinian actor, poet and theater director (born 1967)

Valantina Abu Oqsa is a Palestinian actress, theater director, poet and playwright. She was awarded the 2012 Etel Adnan Award for Women Playwrights announced for her play I Am Free,

== Early life ==
Abu Oqsa was born in Mi'ilya village, in the Upper Galilee, in the north of Israel, on 3 December 1967. She lives in Haifa, Israel, with her husband and children.

== Career ==
Abu Oqsa is a member of the Managing Committee of the Tenth International Women Playwrights Conference (WPIC) in Cape Town. In 1986, she started her career in theater with Al Hakawati Theater Group in Jerusalem after a year and a half of studying theater in Tel Aviv and Jerusalem. At the theater, she is an editor, writer, director and producer. She participated in theatrical productions in Palestine, and performed in cities in Europe, the United States and Arab countries, in several languages. She is one of the co-founders of the Palestinian Theater League in Jerusalem.

On 9 April 2002, during the Battle of Jenin, a group of Palestinian activists tried to deliver supplies and medicine to the Jenin Refugee Camp. Abu Oqsa was among them and was shot in the left arm by an Israeli soldier, and as a result completely lost the use of her left elbow. She became known as the "Struggler artist" to Palestinians.

== Plays ==
Her play I Am Free was described as "poignant, realistic and cruel, it is a dramatic political statement. Her enchanting language, her full-fledged characters of unusual depth and her unique approach to a very important theme, arouse - or should arouse - the admiration of other playwrights, regardless of class, gender, taste and ethnicity."

=== Actress ===
- The Youbeel
- I Am Free/I'm Free...
- Kofr Shamma
- Natreen Faraj (Waiting for Godou)
- Kharbasheh fi Mahatta (A Mess in a Station)
- Al Aydi Al Qathera (The Dirty Hands)
- Bait As Sayyeda” (The House of Bernarda Alba)
- La…Lam Yamot” (No... He Did Not Die)
- The musical theater play “Gilgamesh did not die” (adapted from the Greek legend Gilgamesh)
- Blood Wedding
- Mahatta

=== Writer and director ===
- Co-directed and co-wrote Kharbasheh fi Mahatta (A Mess in a Station)
- Wrote and directed The Dream.
- Adapted and directed Shababeek Al-Ghazala (Windows of The Deer)
- Wrote and Directed puppet show Nus Nseis
- Established and managed the Project “Child Artist” in Haifa 2001-2005

=== Theater festivals ===
- the first Palestinian theater Festival (Kharbasheh fi Mahatta)
- Rooted Moon International theater Festival (The Dream)
- Amman International theater Festival - Amman, Jordan (Mahataa)
- Qirtaj International theater Festival - Qirtaj, Tunisia. (Blood Wedding)
- International Women Playwrights Conference (WPIC) in Stockholm

== Poetry ==
Abu Oqsa has written poetry since 1981. Her first poem was published in 1984, in Al Etihad. She had ten of her poems published in various Palestinian newspapers and in 1999 she published her first poetry book, فالنتينا أبو عُقصة.

== Film and television ==
Year	Title	Role	Note
2005	Mazeh Fee Jad	Umm Sami	TV series
2008	Laila’s Birthday	Woman in the queue	
2008	Pomegranates and Myrrh	Mariam	
2008	My Simple Story	The mother	
2015	Love, Theft & Other Entanglements	A blind woman	
