= János Nyíri =

Hungarian journalist (1932–2002)

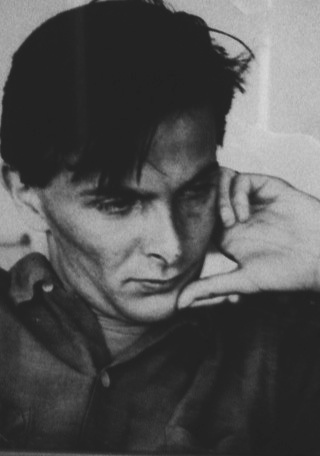
- János Nyíri, Paris, 1970.
- Born: 9 November 1932; Budapest, Hungary
- Died: 23 October 2002 (aged 69); London, England
- Occupations: Theatre Director, novelist, playwright, journalist
- Spouse: Jenny Hippisley (1960–2002)
- Children: Daniel J. Nyiri, Polly Nyiri
- Writing career
- Years active: 1952–2002
- Notable works: Battlefields and Playgrounds, If Winter Comes

János Nyíri (9 November 1932 – 23 October 2002) was a theatre director, journalist and writer. He wrote several highly acclaimed plays and novels, including Battlefields and Playgrounds (London: Macmillan, 1990), recognized by The Observer as the most important novel written by a survivor of the Holocaust.

== Early life ==
János Nyíri was born in Budapest, Kingdom of Hungary, in 1932. His parents were Tibor Nyíri and Julia Spitz, respected Hungarian Jewish writers. His father's most famous work was the novel Katona, Karácsony and the screenplay of the Hungarian film Díszmagyar ("Gala Suit") (Budapest, 1949). Nyíri's parents divorced when he was a small boy, and János went to live on his grandparents' vineyard in rural Tokaj. During World War II and the Holocaust in Hungary, he went into hiding from the Nazi SS and the Hungarian Arrow Cross Party, with his mother and his older brother, András Nyíri. While most of his family and classmates were murdered in the Auschwitz and Mauthausen-Gusen concentration camps, Nyiri survived and was liberated by the Red Army in May 1945. After his military service and officer training as a 2nd Lieutenant in the Hungarian People's Army, Nyíri completed his studies at the Színház- és Filmművészeti Főiskola, the Academy of Cinema and Dramatic Art in Budapest in 1954, and rose to fame as a theatre director, in Kecskemét, Szeged, and Budapest.

== Move to France ==
Shortly after the failed Hungarian Uprising against Soviet occupation in 1956, Nyíri decided to escape to Vienna, and later to Paris, instead of staying in Hungary and facing a probable death sentence, which was the fate of many of his fellow revolutionaries. Nyíri was forbidden to return to Hungary until the amnesty of 1973, when he was commissioned by the New Statesman to return to his native country and write an article, which was published under the title A Chilly Spring in Budapest.

During the 1950s, Nyíri settled in Paris and started working in the theatre again, with such respected dramatists as Eugène Ionesco, Jean Anouilh and Jean Genet. Nyíri also taught at the Conservatoire and studied at the Comédie-Française. Having secured a position as assistant director to Jean-Louis Barrault at the Odéon, he met his future wife, Jenny Hippisley, the daughter of British actors Lindisfarne Hamilton and Christopher Quest, and the great–granddaughter (on her mother's side of the family) of Heinrich Simon, the Jewish scientist, social democrat and leader of the Frankfurt revolutionary parliament of 1848. The Nyíris founded their first theatre company together, Le Jeune Théâtre de Marseille, in 1960. For several years, Nyíri directed successful stage productions of classic French and English plays by Molière, Beaumarchais, Jean Racine and Oscar Wilde, and went on to adapt David Copperfield in Marseille and The Imaginary Invalid at the Vaudeville Theatre in London's West End. (Note: The Imaginary Invalid (Theatre Programme), Vaudeville, London, 1968) He also directed The Marriage of Figaro, Phèdre, The Prime of Miss Jean Brodie and his own works, all over Europe. During this time he and his wife established their family home in southwest London. He and his wife continued to spend time in their homes in England, Ireland and France until his death.

== Life as a playwright ==
If Winter Comes, a love story set "somewhere behind the iron curtain", was Nyíri's first outing as a playwright. He personally directed the first few productions of all his plays, and dedicated If Winter Comes to his "comrades of Budapest and Prague", which caused some controversy, in the sensitive political climate, coming so soon after the Paris riots of 1968. The original Paris production was entitled Le Ciel est en bas, and presented at the Théâtre de l'Athénée in 1970, starring Jean Servais (Note: Le Ciel est en bas (Theatre Programme), L'Athénée, Paris, 1970) The play was both a critical and commercial success, with subsequent stage productions in major theatres as far afield as Austria, Germany, England, Scotland, Wales, Australia, the United States, and even in Hungary, over the following thirty years. Nyíri's work was often adapted for the screen, in England, Germany, and Hungary. (Note: Ha már itt a tél (Film), Magyar Televízió/MaFilm, Budapest, 1985) In 1980 If Winter Comes was turned into a television film for BBC Films, starring Paul Scofield, Denis Lawson and Cherie Lunghi. (Note: If Winter Comes (Film), BBC, London, 1980)

== Novels ==
Nyíri's first novel to be published in English, Streets (London: Wildwood House), (Note: Streets (Book), London: Wildwood House, 1979.) was widely praised in the British press, for its depiction of the Hungarian Revolution against the Soviet occupation of the 1950s. Streets was on most book of the year lists for 1979 and quickly attracted critical success. His second novel Battlefields and Playgrounds, was ten years in the writing. Battlefields and Playgrounds (London: Macmillan, and New York: Farrar, Straus and Giroux), (Note: Battlefields and Playgrounds (Book), Macmillan, London, 1989; Farrar, Straus and Giroux, New York, 1992) has been published in several languages, all over the world. (Note: Madárország (Book), Makkábi Könyvkiadó-Téka Könyvkiadó, Budapest, 1990; Corvina Kiadó, Budapest, 2014; Awakening The Day (Book), Tel Aviv, 1993; Die Juden Schule (Book), Fischer Verlag, Frankfurt, 1993, 2018) His third novel, Curtain Up!, is set in Spain, France and England during the 1960s. It was completed in 2002, shortly before his death.

It was his second novel, of which the Wall Street Journal wrote: "Although hardly a month passes without some new account surfacing about a writer’s childhood during the Holocaust, nothing in recent memory approaches the greatness — the narrative beauty, the sublime character portraits and the cliff-hanging tension and drama — of Battlefields and Playgrounds". The Boston Globe praised the book as: "a panorama of historic events, a cross-section of society’s attitudes at the point of an ultimate test of its values, an exploration of a growing child’s consciousness, a story of a family’s struggle to survive, a dramatic novel of suspense, is also, perhaps most importantly, a treatise on the nature and limits of liberty… At the same time, it is a gigantic portion of what we all… secretly dream of finding in any novel: a riveting story, an engaging protagonist, an enthralling narrative, a convincing portrayal of a human predicament". Battlefields and Playgrounds was also Book of the Year in the Financial Times and chosen by Publishers Weekly as one of the best books of 1995 in the USA.

== Legacy ==
János Nyíri is survived by his wife, Jenny, a brother and sister, a son and daughter and six grandchildren.

== Works ==
- The Imaginary Invalid (theatre production), Vaudeville Theatre, London, 1968
- Le Ciel est en bas (theatre production), L'Athénée, Paris, 1970
  - If Winter Comes (film), BBC, London, 1980
  - Ha már itt a tél (film), Magyar Televízió/MaFilm, Budapest, 1985
- "A Chilly Spring in Budapest" (magazine article), New Statesman, London, 8 June 1973
- Streets (book), London: Wildwood House, 1979
- Battlefields and Playgrounds (book), London: Macmillan, 1989; New York: Farrar, Straus and Giroux, 1992. Review: "Battlefields and Playgrounds, by Janos Nyiri". Kirkus Reviews. 1 November 1995.
  - Madárország (book), Budapest: Makkábi Könyvkiadó-Téka Könyvkiadó, 1990; Budapest: Corvina Kiadó, 2014
  - Awakening The Day (כוכבים של יום) (book), Tel Aviv, 1998
  - Die Juden-Schule (book), Frankfurt: Fischer Verlag, 1992; Frankfurt: S. Fischer Verlag, 2018

== Other reading ==
- Biography for János Nyíri at IMDb
- Biography for Daniel Nyiri at IMDb (János Nyíri's son)
- Books by Janos Nyiri, Amazon.com
- Die Juden-Schule, S. Fischer Verlag, 2018
