= Dinara Uzbekova =

Russian pharmacologist (1933–2020)

Dinara Galievna Uzbekova
- Born: August 22, 1933; Almetyevsk, Tatarstan, Soviet Union
- Died: October 13, 2020 (aged 87)
- Education: Ryazan State Medical University
- Known for: Russian apitherapy courses
- Awards: Honored Worker of Higher School of the Russian Federation (2012)
- Scientific career
- Fields: pharmacology
- Workplaces: Ryazan State Medical University
- Academic advisors: A. A. Nikulin

Dinara Galievna Uzbekova (Russian: Динара Галиевна Узбекова; August 22, 1933 – October 13, 2020) was a Russian pharmacologist, Doctor of Medical Sciences, professor at the Ryazan State Medical University, Chairman of the Ryazan Branch of the All-Russian Society of Pharmacologists, Honored Worker of Higher School of the Russian Federation (2012).

== Biography ==
Uzbekova was born in Almetyevsk, Tatarstan, Soviet Union on August 22, 1933. She graduated with Honors from Ryazan State Medical University in 1957.

From 1959, Uzbekova worked at Ryazan State Medical University:

- From 1978 to 1983, Uzbekova headed the Central Research Laboratory.
- From 1983 to 1993, Uzbekova headed the Department of Clinical pharmacology.
- From 2008 to 2010, Uzbekova headed the Department of Pharmacology.
- From 1994, Uzbekova was curator of apitherapy courses.
- She was later a professor Department of Pharmacology at Ryazan State Medical University.

Uzbekova defended her doctoral dissertation in 1974. She was also a biographer of Nikolai Kravkov.

Uzbekova died on October 13, 2020, at the age of 87.

== Works ==
- D.G. Uzbekova (2003). Evaluation of bee-collected pollen influence on lipid peroxidation, antioxidant system and liver function in old animals
- D.G.Uzbekova (2010). One Hundredth Anniversary of the intravenous anesthesia creation
- DG Uzbekova. At the Origin of the Development of Russian Angiology (Dedicated to the 150 Birthday of Academician N.P. Kravkov). Angiol Sosud Khir 21 (4), 52–55. 2015.
- DG Uzbekova. Nicolai Kravkov's Pancreotoxine. J Med Biogr. 2016 Jul 13.
