= Francesca Sanders =

American dramatist

Francesca Piantadosi is a playwright from Portland, Oregon, publishing under the name Francesca Sanders.

In 2003, she was the recipient of the Oregon Literary Fellowship for Drama. In 2008–2009, she received a $1,013 professional development grant from Portland's Regional Arts & Culture Council.

In 2007/2008, Integrity Productions performed her play "8 Views Towards Center".

Her plays Celeste and Starla Save Todd and Win Back the Day and I Become A Guitar were performed at the Bartell Theatre in Madison, Wisconsin and the Kitchen Theatre in Ithaca, New York, respectively.

== Works ==
- Lilac Samba
- Rising From The Sugar Bowl
- Urashima Taro
- 8 Views Towards Center
- I Become A Guitar
- Ride The Rustling Wheat
- If You Take One Elf Off The Shelf
- Celeste and Starla Save Todd And Win Back The Day
