= Luis Belmonte Bermúdez =

Spanish playwright

Luis Belmonte Bermúdez (c. 1598 – c. 1650) was a playwright of the Spanish Golden Age.

His best known works include the plays:

- El diablo predicador (The Preacher Devil)
- El gran jorge de Castrioto (Great George of Castrioto)
- El sastre del Campillo (The Tailor from Campillo)
