= Dinara Kasko =

Baker

- Born: 1988 (age 37–38)
- Culinary career
- Cooking style: 3D Printing, Cake Baking

Dinara Kasko is a Ukrainian baker, pastry chef and media figure notable for her usage of 3D printing in cake baking.

== Biography ==
Kasko was born in Krasnograd, in the Kharkiv region of Ukraine. She studied to be an architect but chose to retire from her career as a 3D visualizer and take up baking. Kasko's main method of baking involves using a 3D printer to construct a silicone mould that is then used to shape a cake. Her works of confectionery art employ the mathematical principles of the Voronoi diagram and biomimicry. The cakes have been compared to the art of several artists, and Kasko has collaborated with pastry magazine Sogood on a series of cake designs.

Kasko’s main pastry studio in Kharkiv was closed during the 2022 Russian invasion of Ukraine. Kasko, a native of Kharkiv, fled the country to the UK in the early months of the conflict. Her bakery and silicone mould business continue to operate from Ukraine, China and Poland.
