= Ada Lee Bascom =

American novelist, playwright and actress

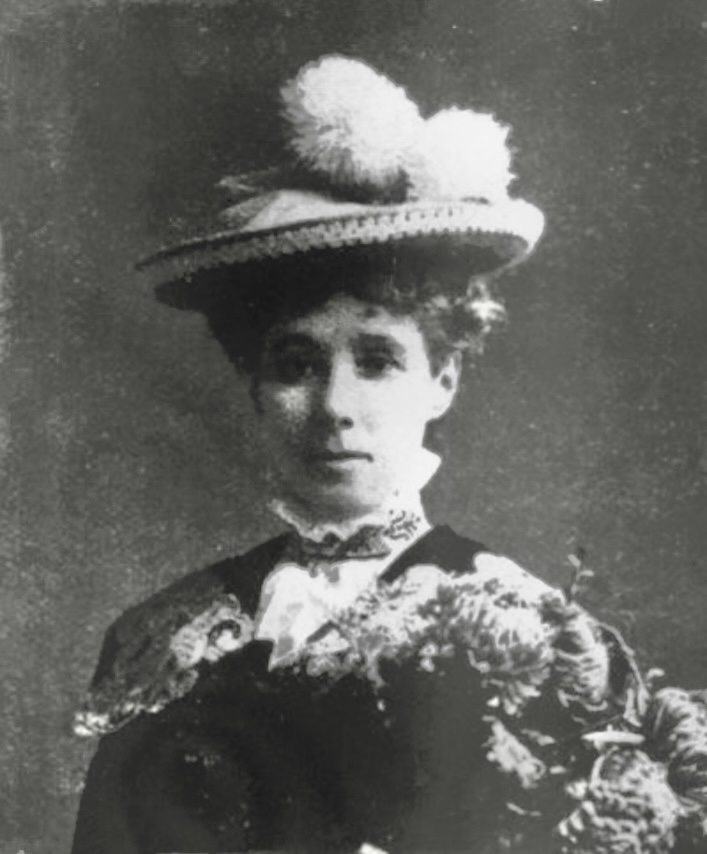
- Ada Lee Bascom, circa 1904
- Born: 1862 or 1863
- Died: July 19, 1928 (aged 65)
- Spouse: George Hamilton Marsden

Ada Lee Bascom Marsden was an American novelist, playwright and actress. She wrote under her mother's maiden name, using the pen names Lee Bascom and Ada Lee Bascom, and sometimes performed under the name Henrie Bascom.

During her life, she wrote short stories, plays, musicals and novels. She and Jack London co-wrote the play The Great Interrogation.

== Biography ==
=== Early life and acting ===
Ada Lee Bascom Swasey was born in San Francisco, California, to William Swasey, a captain. Her grandfather, Henry Bascom, was a chaplain. She had a brother named Henry Street Swasey and a sister later known as Lady Trevor Correy.

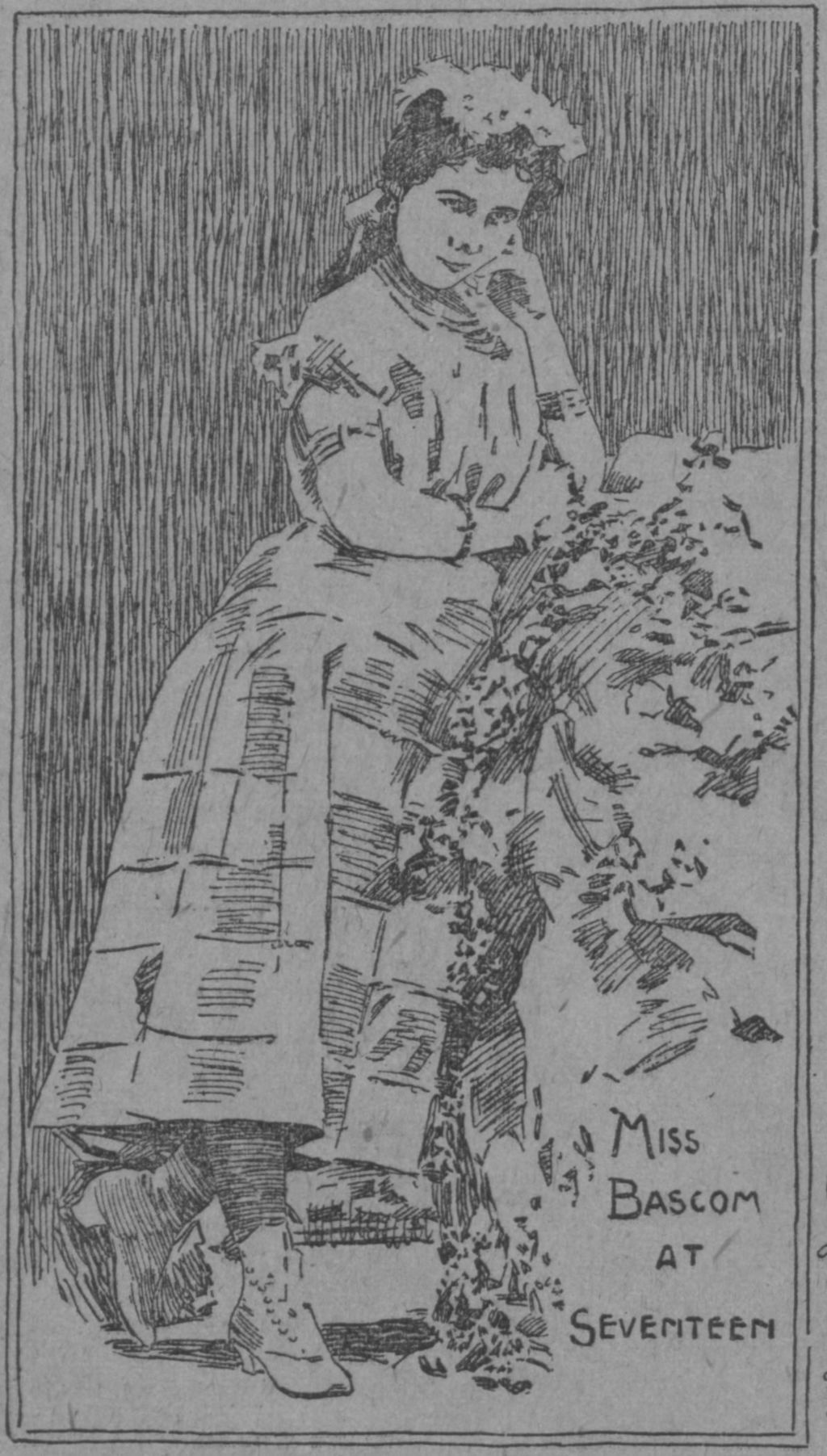
Bascom at seventeen years old, published in The Journal newspaper

As an actor, Bascom was known as a recitationist and dramatic reader, and she used her mother's maiden name of "Bascom" as her stage name. She grew up and began acting in San Francisco. In the city, she played a child's part in Miss Moulton, starring Clara Morris. After that part, she worked her way east through the United States by performing recitations; she then used her proceeds to travel to New York, where she acted alongside Frank Mayo.

In New York, Bascom became close friends with actress Laura Don. Don cast Bascom in a part of her play, A Daughter of the Nile, but the play could not be produced due to Don suddenly becoming ill from tuberculosis. During Don's illness, Bascom traveled with her to Europe to help with her recovery, but Don later died. While in London, Bascom recited at two performances organized by "Mrs. Mackay"; the events also contained performances by Emma Nevada and members of Comedie Francaise.

In 1893, Bascom acted in the play, "A Lady in Venice", which starred Katherine Clemmons as the main actor. For a period of time, she was a supporting actor for Grace Hawthorne in the productions of Camille and East Lynne.

=== Writing career ===
Bascom wrote novels alongside her acting. After returning to New York around 1890, a publisher accepted her melodrama book, A God of Gotham, for print. The book was "a romance from the life of a well-known actress", and although the actress was not explicitly named, the main character "Donita Lorraine" was said to be based on the life of her late friend, Laura Don. The book was published in 1891 by G. W. Dillingham. In an interview about the book, Bascom stated that she intended to leave her acting career behind, saying, "I have given up the stage for good. I never did like the profession much. I prefer writing." In 1892, it was announced she wrote a curtain-raiser farce titled The Little Jade.

When her health started to decline, Bascom switched from acting to writing plays. Her first play was A Daughter of Uncle Sam, and in 1894, the play was brought to theatre manager and producer Charles Frohman for consideration, but she was unable to get a manager to accept the work and produce it.

Her first produced play was A Bowery Girl, written in 1894 and bought by manager Harry Williams that year for production. The play debuted in 1895 at the Grand Opera House in New York City. It received widespread critical praise from New York newspapers; the New York Journal called the play "a melodrama of the purest dye", while the New York Herald stated, "That the 'Bowery Girl' continues to throw a spell about many West Side as well as East Side hearts..." After A Bowery Girl, Bascom wrote the play The Queen of Spades, which featured a female main character. She first produced the play in the United States, and then brought it to Europe.

By 1899, Bascom had moved to England. While living there, she wrote the three-act farce Three Men In A Flat, and her play The Habits of Hamilton was produced in London. Three Men In A Flat was scheduled to be produced in London at the Opera Comique in 1899. In 1900, she filed a copyright for the drama play, Vengeance Is Mine.

Bascom returned from Europe to San Francisco in 1902. In 1904, Bascom's fantasy one-act Bacchante was produced in San Francisco. The year after, Bascom's play Three Men In A Flat ran at the Burbank Theatre. In 1905, Bascom collaborated with Jack London on his first attempt at play-writing. They wrote the play The Great Interrogation based on his story of the same name. The work premiered in San Francisco at the Alcazar Theatre.

== Personal life and death ==
Bascom married George Hamilton Marsden around 1898 in the Church of the Holy Trinity, Stratford-upon-Avon. He was president of the Marsden Publishing Company.

Bascom was a member of the Professional Women's League, the Society of American Dramatists and Composers of New York City, the Daughters of the American Revolution, the Dramatists Club of New York, and the Pioneers of California.

After becoming ill with heart disease, Bascom died at her home in New York on July 19, 1928, at the age of 65.

== Works ==
- A God of Gotham (1891)
- The Little Jade (c. 1892)
- A Daughter of Uncle Sam (c. 1894)
- A Bowery Girl (1894)
- The Queen of Spades
- Three Men In A Flat (c. 1899)
- Vengeance Is Mine (1900)
- The Habits of Hamilton (c. 1904)
- A Japanese Bride (c. 1904)
- Bacchante
