= Adolfo Wilhelmy =

Mexican writer and cultural promoter

Adolfo Wilhelmy was a writer and cultural promoter. He became the first playwright in Baja California. Born in Mazatlán, Sinaloa in 1887, and died in Mexicali in 1958.

He arrived to Baja California and established in Mexicali in 1918 to promote theatrical spectacles (including opera and zarzuela) and the building of the Teatro Municipal (Municipal Theatre). Adolfo Wilhelmy also worked as a journalist. He was president of the Cámara de Comercio de Mexicali (Mexicali Chamber of Commerce) and particular secretary for Mexican president Abelardo L. Rodríguez.

He published "Periodismo, teatro y revolución" and "La expedición armada a la Baja California", among several chronicles, plays and poems.
