= Anne Undeland =

American playwright

Anne Undeland is an American playwright. She is based in the Berkshires of Western Massachusetts.

Undeland graduated from Wesleyan University with a degree in Medieval Studies.

== Plays ==
- Lady Randy (2019)
- Mr. Fullerton (2021)
- Wharton Between the Sheets (2021)
- Madame Mozart, the Lacrimosa (2025)
