= John Smith (English poet) =

English poet and playwright (1662–1717)

John Smith (1662–1717) was an English poet and playwright.

== Life ==
He was the son of John Smith of Barton, Gloucestershire, and in 1676 became a chorister of Magdalen College, Oxford, matriculating on 10 July 1679. He graduated B.A. in 1683, M.A. in 1686; in 1682 he became a clerk of the college, in 1689 usher of the college school.

Smith died at Oxford on 16 July 1717, and was buried in the college chapel.

== Works ==
Smith was the author of:

- Odes Paraphras'd and imitated, in Miscellany Poems and Translations by Oxford Hands, London, 1685.
- Scarronides, or Virgil Travesty: a Mock-Poem on the second Book of Virgil's Æneis, in English Burlesque, London, 1691. It followed the style of Charles Cotton's version of Book I of The Aeneid.
- Poems upon Several Occasions (1713), containing evidence of Smith's dramatic writing, including prologues.

It is generally thought that Smith was the author of Win her and take her, or Old Fools will be Medling: a Comedy, as it is acted at the Theatre Royal by their Majesties Servants, London, 1691. This play, which was issued anonymously, was dedicated Peregrine, Earl of Danby by Cave Underhill the actor, for whom the part of Dulhead may have been written. It contains an epilogue by Thomas D'Urfey. John Genest considered that the plot resembled that of The Virtuoso from 1676, and that the character of Waspish might have been modelled on Snarl in the earlier comedy. The dedicatee of the work is shared with Poems upon Several Occasions.
