= Tracie Chima Utoh =

Nigerian playwright

Professor Tracie Chima Utoh
- Other name: Tracie Utoh-Ezeaguh
- Citizenship: Nigerian
- Occupations: Playwright and Lecturer
- Employer: Nnamdi Azikiwe University
- Notable work: Our Wives Have gone mad again

Tracie Chima Utoh, also known as Tracie Utoh-Ezeajugh, is a Nigerian playwright and Professor of Film and Theatre Design at Nnamdi Azikiwe University.

She has also executed projects and carried out researches in the areas of migration and gender studies. She studied theatre/ dramatic arts at the Universities of Ife, Jos, and Port Harcourt, all in Nigeria. Utoh-Ezeajugh holds many post-doctoral fellowship awards.

She is a Bellagio Residency Rockefeller Fellow (2008) and a fellow of the African Humanities Program of the American Council of Learned Societies 2009/2010, a scheme which invites "outstanding Africa-based scholars" to attend the African Studies Association annual conference and spend a week in an American institution before the conference.

She is an assessor, adviser and mentor for the African Humanities Program and for many other award-giving bodies.

Her academic specialty is the study of the use of costume, makeup and body art, "both as art and as aids to characterization on stage and in films".

She was appointed a member of the NUC National Technical Committee on Nigerian Universities Arts and Culture Festival in 2010. She led the team of scholars in the Bilateral Academic Exchange Program held in the Chinese University of Communication Beijing; Xiamen University; Huaqiao University and University of Education-College of Chinese Language and Culture (2016).

She was awarded the Firebird Foundation for Anthropological Research Fellowship for 2018/2019, and the Endangered Materials Knowledge Programme Large Grant Award of the British Museum for a documentation/documentary project for the period 2021-2024. She also executed research projects for International Labour Organization and Deutsche Gesellschaft Für Internationale Zusammenarbeit.

She is a member of the Society of Nigeria Theater Artists and she served the association in various capacities for 13 years.

Other professional bodies/associations where she belongs include: International Association of Theatre Critics; Association of Nigerian Authors, National Association of Women Academics, Women Writers of Nigeria, Pan African Circle of Artists, African Theatre Association, International Theatre Institute, African Studies Association, Civil Society Forum on Migration and Development, The Review Committee for the National Migration Policy of 2015 and Technical Working Group (TWG) on Migration and Development.

N.E. Izuu, writing in Creative Artist: A Journal of Theatre and Media Studies said that Utoh "exhibits a profound proclivity towards the reiteration of humanist agitation (rather than feminist) which aims at rechannelling literary emphasis to more debilitating phenomena in contemporary society other than the re-inscription of gendered disputations".

== Selected publications ==
=== Plays ===
- Who owns this coffin? : and other plays (1999, Jos, Nigeria: Sweetop Publications)
- Our wives have gone mad again! and other plays (2001, Awka, Anambra State [Nigeria]: Valid Pub. Co. (Nig.) Ltd; ISBN 9789780490355)
- Nneora: an African doll's house (2005, Awka: Valid Publishing Co; ISBN 9789780667153)

=== Other writings ===
- The humanities and globalisation in the 3rd millennium edited by A B C Chiegboka, Tracie Chima Utoh, and G I Ukechukwu (2010, Nimo, Nigeria: Rex Charles & Patrick; ISBN 9789784993234)
