= Cary Mazer =

American playwright and academic

Cary M. Mazer is a contemporary American playwright and academic. He is a Professor Emeritus of Theatre Arts and English at the University of Pennsylvania. He was educated at Princeton University (AB 1974) and Columbia University (MA 1976 and PhD 1980). Among his scholarly writings are Double Shakespeares: Emotional-Realist Acting and Contemporary Performance and Shakespeare Refashioned: Elizabethan Plays on Edwardian Stages. Among his plays are Wounds Invisible, Family Trust, Giraffes, and Talkback. At various times he has served as a member of the Editorial Board of the Shakespeare Bulletin and of advisory or governance bodies relating to White Pines Productions, the Mint Theatre, and the Red Heel Theatre.
