= New Plays from Europe =

New Plays from Europe Theatre Biennale "New Plays from Europe" / Neue Stücke aus Europa is a large-scale international festival dedicated exclusively to productions of contemporary plays in their original languages. They are presented with a simultaneous translation into German. The focus is on authors and texts.

The festival program aims to provide a reflection of the most pressing topics facing Europe: conflicting national characteristics and idiosyncrasies, diverse interpretations of European identity as well as questions of isolation and self-assertion. Being exposed to different views on familiar occurrences and gaining new perspectives on the concept of European identity ideally lead to an improved understanding of the cultural differences unique to each European country. This festival aspires to pave the way towards a united, multifaceted and heterogeneous European cultural area – challenging, critical and tolerant. Expectations are disrupted and viewing habits are challenged: it is a “continuous attack against stereotyped thinking” as Christine Wahl wrote in the magazine Theatre Heute.

== Patrons ==
New Plays From Europe relies on a network of “patrons”, including playwrights from 41 European countries, including Biljana Srbljanović (Serbia), Özen Yula (Turkey) and Bernhard Studlar (Austria), Gianina Carbunariu (Romania), Simona Semenić (Slovenia), Mark Ravenhill (Great Britain), Paul Pourveur (Belgium), Hristo Boytchev (Bulgaria), Laura Ruohonen (Finland), Akos Németh (Hungary), and Tena Štivičić (Croatia). They propose productions to the Artistic Director and inform the network about current theatre events in their countries. Their advice and appraisals guarantee that the plays presented in Wiesbaden and Mainz are relevant in their countries of origin.

== Forums ==
Since it was founded in 1992, New Plays from Europe has considered itself as a developmental festival for theatre professionals from all disciplines. In 5 fora, young talents pair up with experienced professionals to work together collaboratively: up-and-coming authors from throughout Europe, budding theatre critics and bloggers, dramaturgy students, the patron playwrights and theatre translators.

== Artistic direction ==
The New Plays from Europe 2012 team of artistic directors consists of: Manfred Beilharz, artistic director of Hessisches Staatstheater Wiesbaden, the author Tankred Dorst, a frequently staged German playwright, his co-author Ursula Ehler and the dramaturg Maya Schöffel, who has served as festival organizational director since 2007. Head dramaturge Marie Luise Rötzer curates on behalf of the Staatstheater Mainz.
