= Robert B Suda =

Hungarian-British playwright (born 1978)

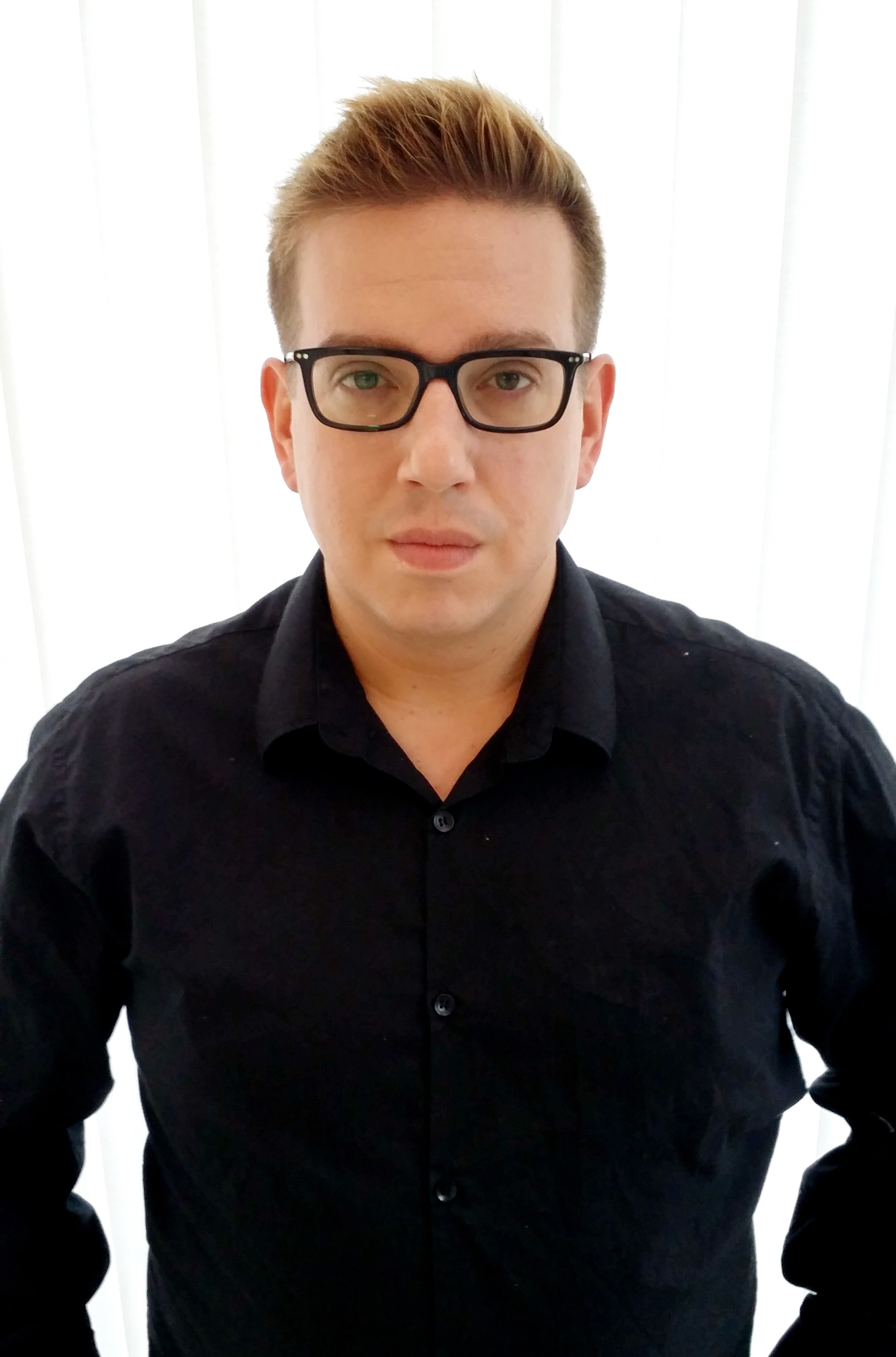
- Born: 16 June 1978 (age 48); Budapest, Hungary
- Occupations: Director, Producer
- Years active: 1997–

Robert B Suda (a.k.a. Suda Balázs Róbert, born 16 June 1978) is a London-based theatre director, playwright and producer who has a BA and two MAs in cultural management (Janus Pannonius University of Pecs - 2000), theatre project management (University of Pecs 2002) and advanced theatre studies (Theatrology – University of Pannonia 2006). Since 1997, he has directed and produced numerous shows on stage, which have been highly acclaimed by both critics and audiences. He also has significant experience in producing for stage and for TV. He was both educated in and employed Constantin Stanislavski's method of psychological realism Theatrical realism and the directing technique of Bertold Brecht Epic theatre. His works are also highly influenced by neo-expressionism, constructivism and minimalism. In his productions he has combined these techniques with elements of physical theatre, dance, pantomime and minimalist architectural set design both in prose and musical productions. He worked in long-term artistic collaboration with Veronika Karsai pantomime artist and physical-theatre director. During their teamwork they developed and staged two productions (Cursed Cows, richard2nixon) establishing their own theatrical form of expression. Suda's another long-term collaborative artistic colleague was Attila Galambos with whom they not only have written mainstream musicals (That's Enough!, Covershow, Better Than Sex), but Galambos, as an actor, was a part of many of Suda's productions (The Dumb-waiter, Cursed Cows, Covershow, moNOporno). In 2005, he was selected as one of the best young playwrights of the year by the Young Writers’ Association, Hungary, (FISz) for his play Cursed Cows, which he both wrote and directed. The script was published by the Association in 2006.

== Theatre works ==
=== Director ===
Dates	Type of production	Title of production	Position	Company / Venue
November 2011 – 2013	musical	Confusion – The Musical	Director (in Development)	Chateau d'If Productions and Entertainment, USA
June–August 2011	comedy	Who Does She Think She Is?	Director	Beez Works Etcetera Theatre, London
September 2010	Tour	Better Than Sex (Jobb, Mint a Szex)	Director	PostMinArt Productions Pince Theatre, Budapest
July–August 2010	musical comedy	Better Than Sex – The Musical	Director	PostMinArt Productions Courtyard Theatre, London
May–June 2009	musical show	Halloween Musical Madness (revival)	Director	Musicalitas Theatrical Ltd. FMK, Budapest
May–June 2009	drama	Beyond Flesh and Blood	Director	JC Theatre productions, Tabard Theatre, London
December 2008–June 2009	drama	MoNOporno (Based on Strindberg's Miss Julie)	Director	Strindberg 2009 Production RS9 Theatre, Budapest
October 2008–February 2009	Tour, musical show	Halloween Musical Madness (Rocky Horror Show, Little Shop Of Horror)	Director	Musicalitas Theatrical Ltd. FMK, Budapest, Austria, Slovakia
September 2008–February 2009	choir concert series	JazzAndMore's Night	Director	SoundCulture Foundation, Budapest
December 2006–June 2007	musical	COVERSHOW - the musical	Director	EXau Theatre Ent. Belvarosi Theatre, Budapest
October 2005–June 2006	drama	richard2nixon (based on Shakespeare's King Richard II)	Director	Melange Cultural Ltd. Thalia Theatre, Budapest
October 2004–June 2005	drama	Cursed Cows	Director	Melange Cultural Ltd. RS9 Theatre, Budapest
May 2000–June 2000	drama	Nicholas Wright's Mrs. Klein	Director	Musico Theatre Art Foundation Kolibri Studio Theatre, Budapest
October 2001–June 2002	drama	The Duchess of Malfi	Second Assistant to the director Tim Carroll, UK	Barka Theatre, Budapest
1999–2001	drama	The Dumb-waiter	Director	Musico Theatre Art Foundation Mezei Maria Theatre, Budapest
1997–1999	musical comedy	That's Enough!	Director	Musico Theatre Art Foundation Pataky Arts Centre – Budapest
1997	drama	Maxim Gorky's The Lower Depths (На дне)	Trainee director, Director: Tamas Adam, Hungary	GNM Theatre Productions Jozsefvarosi Chamber Theatre, Budapest

=== Producer ===
Dates	Type of production	Title of production	Position	Company / Venue
July – August 2010	musical comedy	Better Than Sex – The Musical	Co-Producer	PostMinArt Productions Courtyard Theatre, London; Pinceszinhaz, Budapest
December 2008–June 2009	drama	MoNOporno (Based on Strindberg's Miss Julie)	Producer	Strindberg 2009 Production RS9 Theatre, Budapest
December 2006–June 2007	musical	COVERSHOW – The musical	Co-Producer	EXau Entertainment Belvarosi Theatre, Budapest
October 2005–June 2006	drama	richard2nixon (based on Shakespeare's King Richard II)	Co-Producer	Melange Cultural Ltd. Thalia Theatre, Budapest
October 2004–June 2005	drama	Cursed Cows	Co-Producer	Melange Cultural Ltd. RS9 Theatre, Budapest

=== Dramaturge ===
Dates	Type of production	Title of production	Position	Company / Venue
October 2003 – June 2006	drama	Goodrich—Hackett—Kesselman's Diary of Anne Frank	Dramaturge	Budapest Chamber Theatre Tivoli Theatre
2000	TV-documentary	The Life of Bela Bartok	Dramaturge	Honved Art Ensemble, Budapest

== Critical reaction ==
- “With an impressive use of multimedia and a strong all-female cast delivering witty lines, Who Does She Think She Is? captures the fickleness of females and the trials we often face when trying to fit in.”
- “...the show does have originality on its side and a big, beating heart thanks to an enthusiastic six-strong cast”
- ″Well, to be fair, it was quite entertaining.″
- "The result is bold, madcap chaos, as if a GCSE history teacher, undergoing a nervous breakdown, was giving the final lesson of his life. Original, impossible to forget and almost too ridiculous to recommend, this is one of the most bamboozling nights we’ve ever spent at the theatre."
- “Expect the unexpected, leave some prejudices behind and you'll have a rewarding eighty minutes.”
- “...who make a trip here, could catch some twenty minutes of red-hot music, sectioned into lively mini-concerts, and in addition, will get a great minimal-drama without pomposity .”
- “Julie’ll rock you!”
- “The ending praises the prodigious talent of Robert B Suda. Even after the many twists and turns it surprises the audience, whose attention is not let to wander for a second.”

== Awards ==
While he was working on different stage productions, Mr Suda was a theatre columnist of Musical&Operetta magazine between2003 and 2005 where he published many articles and interviews regarding Hungarian and international musical productions. Mr Suda was commissioned by MUSICALITAS School for Musical and Drama (Budapest) to undertake the role of the drama, musical and theatre history teacher of school for a year term from 2008.

The Young Writers' Association(FISz) published his first collection of dramas in 2007 including the award-winner play Cursed Cows (ÁtkozottTehenek) and the highly successful political play, richard2nixon, co-written by Elod P Csirmaz for the Thalia Theatre, Budapest.
