= Dinara Rakhimbaeva =

Kazakh model and blogger (born 1995)

- Born: January 27, 1995 (age 31); Almaty
- Modeling information
- Height: 177 cm (5 ft 10 in)

Dinara Rakhimbaeva (Kazakh: Dinara Vitalievna Rahimbaeva, born January 27, 1995, in Almaty) is a Kazakh model and blogger.

== Biography ==
Dinara Rakhimbaeva was born on January 27, 1995, in Almaty to a Russian father and a Kazakh mother. Dinara is the eldest of three children. She has a sister, Islana, and a brother, Zhangir. Rakhimbaeva graduated from the Lyceum Number 134 of Almaty. In 2017 she graduated from the University of Nottingham with a degree in Finance.

Since creating an Instagram profile in August 2015, Rakhimbaeva has become a popular social media influencer, gaining over 487,000 followers.

Rakhimbaeva became known for her appearance and figure, especially her narrow waist, for which she has been labelled the "Barbie Of Kazakhstan" in the media.

The model is 5-foot 9-inch with a 22-inch waist and weighing 7 stone.

In 2017, her photoshoot for the Kazakh underwear brand Bite Me Lingerie, published in the pages of L'Officiel Kazakhstan magazine, received harsh criticism from the Muslim population and was intensely covered in the media of Kazakhstan and several other countries.

Rakhimbaeva later hit out at critics saying "Why are you so mean? There is so much hate directed towards me but I did not do nothing to you. I would like to wish you all happiness and love."

In 2018, Rakhimbaeva posed for the Men's Health Kazakhstan magazine. She also played in the Christmas Comedy "Kelinka is also a human 2".

In March 2019, she was posted a nude photoshoot on her Instagram.
