= David-Augustin de Brueys =

French theologian (1641–1723)

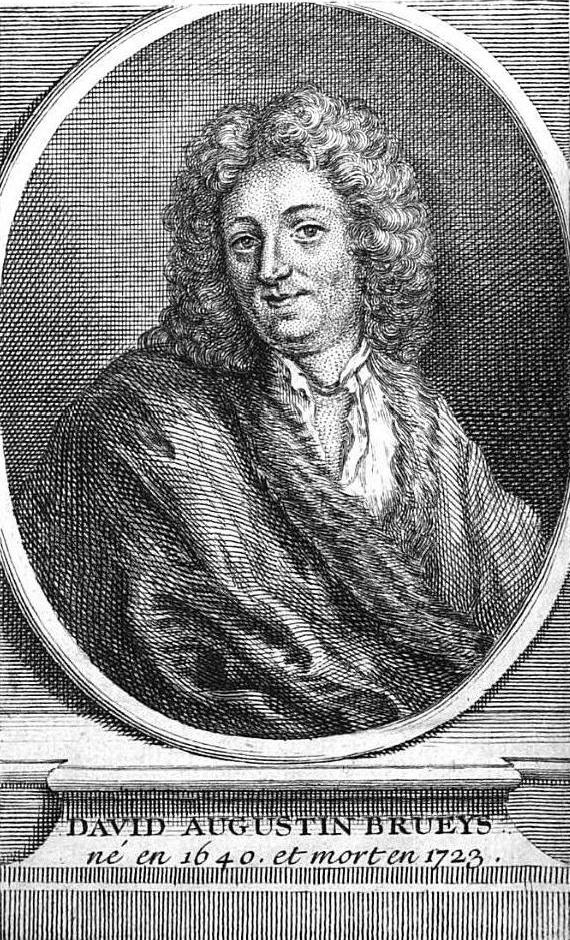
- Born: 18 September 1641; Aix-en-Provence
- Died: 25 November 1723 (aged 82); Montpellier
- Occupations: Theologian; Playwright

David-Augustin de Brueys (18 September 1641 – 25 November 1723) was a French theologian and playwright. He was born in Aix-en-Provence. His family was Calvinist, and he studied theology. After writing a critique of Jacques-Bénigne Bossuet's work, he was in turn converted to Catholicism by Bossuet in 1681, and later became a priest.

After his conversion, he was actively engaged in propagating the faith. He also managed to be joint editor with Palaprat in the production of plays. He died in Montpellier.

== Publications ==
- 1682: Réponse au livre de Mr de Condom, intitulé « Exposition de la doctrine de l'Église catholique sur les matières de controverse »
- 1683: Examen des raisons qui ont donné lieu à la séparation des Protestans
- 1686: Défense du culte extérieur de l'Eglise catholique, avec la réfutation des deux réponses faites à l'examen des raisons qui ont donné lieu à la séparation des Protestants et aux nouveaux convertis
- 1686: Réponse aux plaintes des Protestans contre les moyens que l'on employe en France pour les réunir à l'Église, où l'on réfute les calomnies qui sont contenuës dans le livre intitulé « La Politique du clergé de France », et dans les autres libelles de cette nature
- 1686: Traité de l'Eucharistie, en forme d'entretiens
- 1687: Traité de l'Église, en forme d'entretiens, ce qui sert de réfutation aux derniers livres de Messieurs Claude et Jurieu
- 1690: Action de grâces pour remercier Dieu des prospéritez de la France
- 1692: Histoire du fanatisme de nostre temps, et le dessein que l'on avoit de soulever en France les mécontens des calvinistes
- 1700: Traité de la sainte messe
- 1709: Traité de l'obéissance des chrétiens aux puissances temporelles
- 1727: Traité du légitime usage de la raison, principalement sur les objets de la foy Read online

Theatre

- 1691: Le Grondeur, comedy in 3 acts and in prose, Paris, Comédie-Française, 3 February
- 1691: Le Muet, comedy in 5 acts and in prose, Paris, Théâtre-Français, 22 June
- 1692: La Fille de bon sens, comedy in three acts, with Jean de Palaprat, Paris, Hôtel de Bourgogne, 2 November
- 1694: L'Important de cour, comedy, with Jean de Palaprat
- 1698: Les Empiriques, comedy in 3 acts
- 1699: Gabinie, Christian tragedy
- 1706: L'Avocat Patelin, comedy in 3 acts, with Jean de Palaprat, Paris, Comédiens français ordinaires du Roi, 4 June
- 1721: La Force du sang, ou le Sot toujours sot, comedy in three acts, Paris, Théâtres Français et Italien, 21 April
- 1725: L'Opiniâtre, comedy in three acts

Collected works

- 1712: Œuvres choisies de Brueys et de Palaprat, preface by Louis-Simon Auger (2 volumes) Read online 1 2
