= Jean de Palaprat =

French lawyer and playwright

Jean de Palaprat (May 1650 – 14 October 1721), was a French lawyer and playwright.

Palaprat was born in Toulouse, Languedoc. He mostly co-authored plays with David-Augustin de Brueys; many were premièred at the Comédie-Française and Théâtre-Français in Paris. Their plays were published posthumously in Les Œuvres de théâtre de Messieurs Brueys et de Palaprat in 1755. Palaprat died in Paris.
