= T. James Belich =

American dramatist (born 1976)

T. James Belich (born 1976, also known by the pseudonym of Colorado Tolston) is an American playwright and actor. He is the author of a dozen plays in genres that include mystery, fantasy, religious, and children's. His works have been performed not only in the United States, but also around the world in places such as Africa, the United Kingdom, the Philippines and New Zealand.

Belich has been heavily influenced by the works of such authors as C. S. Lewis, J. R. R. Tolkien, and Madeleine L'Engle.

In 2002, Belich helped found the Critical Mass Playwrighting Fellowship in the Twin Cities, Minnesota, which led to creation of the Hodge-Podge Players (now the Hodge-Podge Theatre Company), a theatre group which focuses on presenting theatre for youth and family audiences. The Hodge-Podge Theatre Company primarily produces original work by Critical Mass members.

In addition to his career as a playwright, Belich also has a background in the sciences, having studied physics at the University of Minnesota where he earned a PhD under his advisor, Dr. James Kakalios.

Belich has also been active in the theatre in other capacities. He has acted in a wide range of roles, and has worked behind the scenes in positions ranging from lighting designer to producer. In 2006 he brought his own play, Illinois Jane and the Pyramid of Peril, to the Minnesota Fringe Festival with his new company, The Pauper's Theater. Belich currently resides in Saint Paul, Minnesota, with his wife Kelly.

== List of works ==
- The Captain's Treasure, A Commedia Heuer Publishing
- Eponine (Contemporary) Heuer Publishing
- A Slip in Time (Murder mystery)
- World That Never Was (Science-fiction)
- Light Never Dies (Fantasy epic)
- Rexque Futurus (Arthurian)
- Ace of Diamonds (Murder mystery) – Big Dog Plays
- ReFUSION: Tale of the Oracle (Storytelling fantasy)
- Twilight of the King (Christmas comedy) – Playscripts, Inc.
- Forgotten Fire: Tale of the Burning Sword (Storytelling fantasy)
- Illumination: A New Tenebrae (with AvaLynn Nadine Grant)
- The Tiger, the Brahmin and the Jackal (Folk tale) – Heuer Publishing
- Masterminds (with K. Thomas Whitby and Corey Mills)
- The Wind in the Willows (Children's) – Playscripts, Inc.
- Illinois Jane and the Rainforest of Retribution (Adventure comedy) – Playscripts, Inc.
- The Princess and the Moon (Fairytale comedy)
