= Dinara Yuldasheva =

Uzbek playwright and theatre director (born 1952)

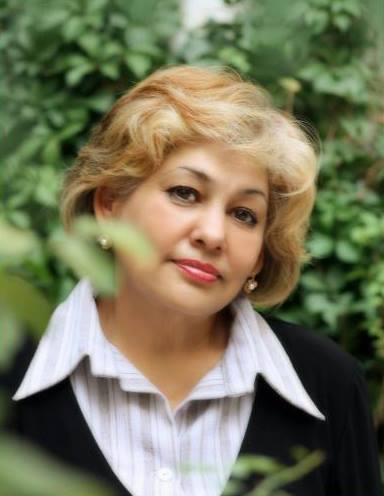
- Born: Dinara Alidzhanovna Yuldasheva; 11 January 1952 (age 74); Tashkent, Uzbekistan
- Occupations: Playwright and director

Dinara Yuldasheva (Uzbek: Dinara Yoʻldosheva/Динара Йўлдошева, Russian: Динара Юлдашева) (born 11 January 1952 in Tashkent) is an Uzbek playwright and theatre director.

== Biography ==
Dinara Yoldosheva was born on 1 November 1952, in the city of Tashkent, into a family of artists. Her mother was Nazira Aliyeva, an honored artist of Uzbekistan and a professor of stage speech at the Uzbekistan State Institute of Arts and Theater.

In 1974, she graduated from the Faculty of Theater Criticism at the Tashkent Theater and Art Institute. From 1983 to 1988, she received specialized education in the field of teaching methods at the Tashkent State Pedagogical Institute.

From 1976 to 1986, she served as the head of the literary department at the Youth Theater. In 1991, she became the head of the literary department at the Republic Drama Theater, and from 2008, she worked as a director and a stage director. Starting in 2019, she held the position of chief director at the State Drama Theater.

== Staged performances ==
- "Quvnoq Balagʻanchiq" (1997-year)
- "Kichik gugurtchi qiz"(2001– year)
- "Yana Andersen" (2002– year)
- "Kim mushuk boʻldi?" (2002– year)
- "Shelkunchik" (2008– year)
- "Qizil qalpoqcha"(2008– year)
- "Yulduzli bola" (2008– year)
- "Semurg" (2009– year)
- "Soya" (2010– year)
- "Eh, bu Xoʻja Nasriddin" (2011– year)
- "Baxram merosi" (2012– year)
- "Dyumcha" (2014– year)
- "Oʻyinqaro quyoncha" (2015– year)
- "Quyosh va qor odamlari" (2016– year)
- "Soya" (2017-yil)
- "Qani olgʻa Misik!" (2017– year)
- "Mazl va Shlimazl" (2019– year)

== Family ==
Dinara's husband, the theater enthusiast Tohir Yoldoshev, began his career at the Institute of Arts in Uzbekistan and defended his academic degree in 1984. He held several prominent positions, including being the first secretary of Bernard Kariyev, the head of the Theater Workers' Union, and the head of the department of creative work. He worked as a director at the Uzbek Youth Theater, served as the director of the Republic National Cultural Center, and later returned to the Institute of Arts. From 2007, he worked part-time at the High National School of Dance and Choreography. After retiring, he assumed the role of the head of the Department of Art Theory and History. Dinara's father, Tahir Ismoilovich Yoldoshev was a theater specialist and teacher. She has two granddaughters Renata and Dinara.
