= Ministry of Foreign Affairs (Azerbaijan) =

Government ministry of Azerbaijan

Ministry of Foreign Affairs of Azerbaijan
- Azərbaycan Respublikasının Xarici İşlər Nazirliyi
- Coat of arms of Azerbaijan

Agency overview
- Formed: May 28, 1918
- Jurisdiction: Government of Azerbaijan
- Headquarters: 4 Shikhali Gurbanov St., Baku, Azerbaijan 1009
- Minister responsible: Jeyhun Bayramov
- Deputy Ministers responsible: Mahmud Mammad-Guliyev; Araz Azimov; Fariz Rzayev; Elnur Mammadov; Yalchin Rafiyev
- Website: www.mfa.gov.az

Ministry of Foreign Affairs of Azerbaijan (Azerbaijani: Azərbaycan Respublikasının Xarici İşlər Nazirliyi) is a Cabinet-level governmental agency of the Republic of Azerbaijan in charge of conducting and designing the country's foreign policy.

The ministry was first established in 1918. In the Soviet era it largely lost its sovereign authority which was restored after Azerbaijan's independence in 1991.

== History ==
The Ministry of Foreign Affairs of Azerbaijan was established in 1918, during the first Republic of Azerbaijan. In that period, Azerbaijan gained international recognition and built diplomatic relations with several countries. In 1918–1920 there were representatives in Armenia, Georgia, Turkey, Turkistan, with embassy and authorized representative offices. Azerbaijan also had an authorized representative office at Paris Peace Conference under the leadership of Alimardan Topchubashov.

After the Bolsheviks occupied Azerbaijan in April, 1920, the Ministry of Foreign Affairs was abolished and was replaced by Azerbaijan SSR People's Foreign Affairs Commissariat (PFAC). People's Foreign Affairs Commissariat, despite having the relevant authority, implemented certain bilateral relations in foreign countries in 1920-1922, including Turkey, where Azerbaijan SSR had its own ambassador, Ibrahim Abilov. People's Foreign Affairs Commissioners of Azerbaijan were Nariman Narimanov and Mirza Davud Huseynov. But upon incorporation of Azerbaijan SSR into Transcaucasian SFSR PFAC was abolished.

Towards the end of World War II, in 1944, the Soviet government restored Azerbaijani PFAC. In 1946 PFAC was transformed into Ministry of Foreign Affairs (MFA). But MFA still lacked relevant authority inside the Soviet Union. The last Foreign Minister of Azerbaijan SSR was Huseynaga Sadigov who led MFA also during seven months of independent Azerbaijan Republic.

After Azerbaijan gained its independence in 1991, MFA was transformed into a complex Cabinet-level agency, responsible for designing and conducting Azerbaijani foreign policy.

== Mission ==
The Ministry of Foreign Affairs is operated in accordance with the Azerbaijani constitution, legislation, regulations, decrees and the main missions are:

- Implementation of the foreign policy of Azerbaijan
- Support for protection of international peace and security through the diplomatic way
- Providing sovereignty, security, territorial integrity of Azerbaijan and its political, economic interests throughout the diplomatic way
- Protection of rights and interests of Azerbaijanis and legal entities abroad
- Ensuring diplomatic and consular relations of Azerbaijan with other states and international organizations
- Providing the state protocol of Azerbaijan
- Diplomatic support and coordination of international, political, economic, scientific, technical, cultural and humanitarian relations of Azerbaijan and its separate state bodies

== Structure and organization ==
As of 2020:

- Minister - Jeyhun Bayramov
  - Office of the Minister
  - Ambassadors at Large
  - Department of State Protocol
  - Azerbaijan International Development Agency (AIDA)
  - Department of Consular Affairs
  - Secretariat of the UNESCO National Commission of Azerbaijan
  - Translation Section
  - Information Technologies Section
  - Department of the Ministry of Foreign Affairs in Nakhchivan Autonomous Republic - By decree of president Ilham Aliyev on 31 October 2005, the department was established in order to govern the foreign policy of Azerbaijan with the participation of Nakhchivan Autonomous Republic.
- Deputy Minister - Hafiz Pashayev
  - Diplomatic Academy of MFA
- Deputy Minister - Araz Azimov (multilateral and security affairs)
  - Department of Security Affairs
  - Department of Foreign Policy Planning and Strategic Studies
- Deputy Minister - Khalaf Khalafov (bilateral and legal affairs)
  - First (West) Territorial Department
  - Second (East) Territorial Department
  - Department of International Law and Treaties
- Deputy Minister - Mahmud Mammed-Guliyev (economic and humanitarian affairs)
  - Department of Economic Cooperation and Development
  - Department of Human Rights, Democratization and Humanitarian Affairs
- Deputy Minister - Nadir Huseynov (general affairs)
  - General Secretariat
  - Department of Press and Information Policy
  - Department of Human Resources
  - Department of Finance Department of Administrative Affairs

== Diplomacy Day ==
Day of the Diplomatic Service, also known as Diplomacy Day, is an official professional holiday in Azerbaijan. Since 2017, according to the Ilham Aliyev's order on the establishment of a professional holiday for employees of the diplomatic services of Azerbaijan, it is celebrated on July 9 each year.

== Diplomatic Academy ==
Azerbaijan Diplomatic Academy (ADA) was launched in 2006 in order to prepare global leaders and politicians. In 2014, by the decree of president, it was transformed into university.

== Azerbaijani representation abroad ==
In order to increase its diplomatic missions abroad, Azerbaijani government in the middle of 2000 launched the related strategy. In 2018 the Ministry of Foreign Affairs maintained the following missions abroad:

- 71 diplomatic representations
- 5 representatives at international organizations
- 8 consulates
- 3 honorary consulates
- 2 embassies’ representations

The Ministry of Foreign Affairs also cooperates with a number of international and regional organizations. Close relations are maintained with Organization of Islamic Conference (OIC), United Nations (UN), European Union (EU), Commonwealth Independent States (CIS), GUAM, North Atlantic Treaty Organization (NATO), UNESCO, Council of Europe, TURKPA and the Cooperation Council of Turkic Speaking States.

== List of ministers ==
=== Azerbaijan Democratic Republic ===
Ministers	Years
Mammadhasan Hajinsky	28 May – 6 October 1918
Alimardan Topchubashov	6 October - 26 December 1918
Fatali Khan Khoysky	26 December 1918 – 14 April 1919
Mammadyusif Jafarov	14 April – 12 December 1919
Fatali Khan Khoysky	12 December 1919 – 1 April 1920

=== Azerbaijan Soviet Socialist Republic ===
Ministers	Years
Nariman Narimanov	1 April 1920 – May 1921
Mirza Huseynov	May – December 1921
Mahmud Aliyev	1944 – 1958
Tahira Tahirova	1959 – 1983
Elmira Gafarova	1983 – 1987
Huseynaga Sadiqov	23 January 1988 – 18 October 1991

=== Republic of Azerbaijan ===
Ministers	Years
Huseynaga Sadiqov	18 October 1991 – 29 May 1992
Tofiq Gasimov	4 July 1992 – 26 June 1993
Hasan Hasanov	2 September 1993 – 16 February 1998
Tofig Zulfugarov	5 Mart 1998 – 26 October 1999
Vilayet Guliyev	26 October 1999 – 2 April 2004
Elmar Mammadyarov	2 April 2004 – 16 July 2020
Jeyhun Bayramov	16 July 2020 –

== See also ==
- List of Foreign Ministers of Azerbaijan
- Azerbaijan–European Union relations
- Azerbaijan and GUAM relations
- Azerbaijan and the United Nations
- Azerbaijan–NATO relations
- Azerbaijan–OIC relations
