= Tofig Zulfugarov =

Azerbaijani politician (born 1959)

- Tofiq Zülfüqarov
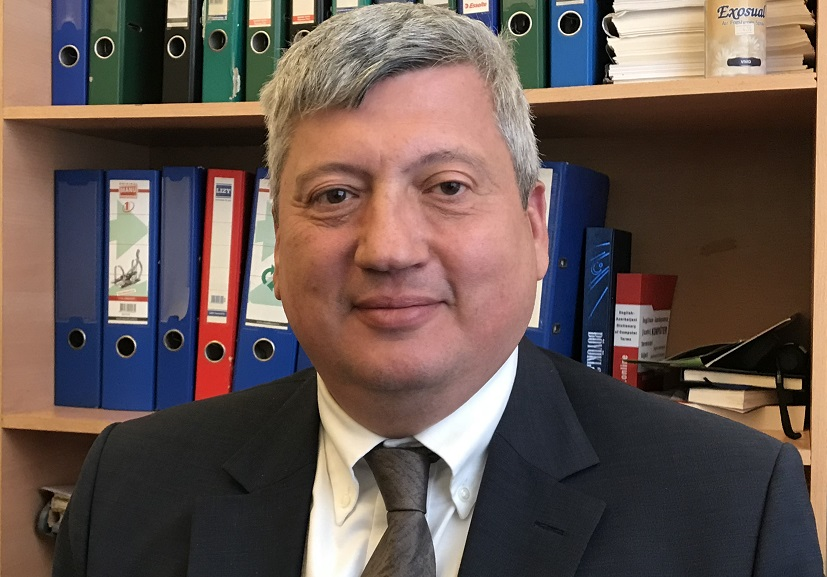

Minister of Foreign Affairs
- In office 5 March 1998 – 26 October 1999
- President: Heydar Aliyev
- Preceded by: Hasan Hasanov
- Succeeded by: Vilayat Guliyev

Ambassador of Azerbaijan to Estonia
- In office 10 April 2007 – 25 November 2015
- Preceded by: Position established
- Succeeded by: Murad Najafbayli

Ambassador of Azerbaijan to Latvia
- In office 27 June 2005 – 11 October 2010
- Preceded by: Position established
- Succeeded by: Elman Zeynalov

Personal details
- Born: November 1, 1959 (age 67) Rostov, Russian SFSR, USSR

Tofig Nadir oglu Zulfugarov (Azerbaijani: Tofiq Nadir oğlu Zülfüqarov; born 1959) also spelled as Tofiq Zulfuqarov, is a politician from Azerbaijan. He was Minister of Foreign Affairs of Azerbaijan under Heydar Aliyev from March 1998 until October 1999 when he was replaced by Vilayat Guliyev.

== Early life ==
Zulfugarov was born on November 1, 1959, in a Russian town of Rostov. His family moved to Baku, Azerbaijan in 1961. He studied at Baku school No. 93 in 1966-1976. Zulfugarov was admitted to in 1976 and graduated from Azerbaijan State University with a degree in Oriental studies (Eastern studies) in 1981. In 1981-1984, he served in Soviet Navy. From 1984 through 1985, Zulfugarov worked at the Komsomol committee. From 1985 on, he worked at the Department of Arabic studies at the Azerbaijan National Academy of Sciences. In 1988, Zulfugarov started working on resolution of the Nagorno-Karabakh conflict. In 1991, he worked at the Political Science department of Institute of History of National Academy of Sciences.

== Political career ==
In 1992, Zulfugarov started working at the Ministry of Foreign Affairs of Azerbaijan. During his career at the ministry, he served as head of department, office director, deputy minister and eventually, from March 5, 1998, as the Minister of Foreign Affairs of Azerbaijan Republic. In October 1999, Zulfugarov resigned along with Vafa Guluzade and Eldar Namazov as a sign of protest for unacceptable plan for resolution of Nagorno-Karabakh conflict which included a territorial swap between Azerbaijan and Armenia with Azerbaijan recognizing de facto rule of Armenia of Nagorno-Karabakh and Armenia ceding Meghri corridor allowing the physical link between Azerbaijan's exclave of Nakhichevan with Azerbaijan proper. Zulfugarov has been a proponent of granting Armenians of Nagorno-Karabakh the highest degree of self-rule and autonomy within Azerbaijan claiming it would be "less than independence but more than autonomy". During his term as Minister of Foreign Affairs, Zulfugarov signed a number of important state documents including the Weapons of mass destruction (WMD) Counter Proliferation Agreement with the United States, as a result of which the US Department of Defense in partnership with US Customs Service trained and equipped the Azerbaijani counterparts in techniques preventing, deterring and investigating incidents related to proliferation of WMDs (nuclear, chemical and biological weapons).

In 2005, he was appointed Ambassador of Azerbaijan Republic to Latvia. Under the same mandate, Zulfugarov is also the Ambassador to Estonia. Zulfugarov is often credited for his extensive work on Karabakh problem, peacemaking initiatives and restoration of territorial integrity of Azerbaijan Republic.

Tofig Zulfugarov is fluent in Russian, Arabic and English.

== See also ==
- Elmar Mammadyarov
- Ministers of Foreign Affairs of Azerbaijan Republic
