= Eldar Namazov =

Azerbaijani politician

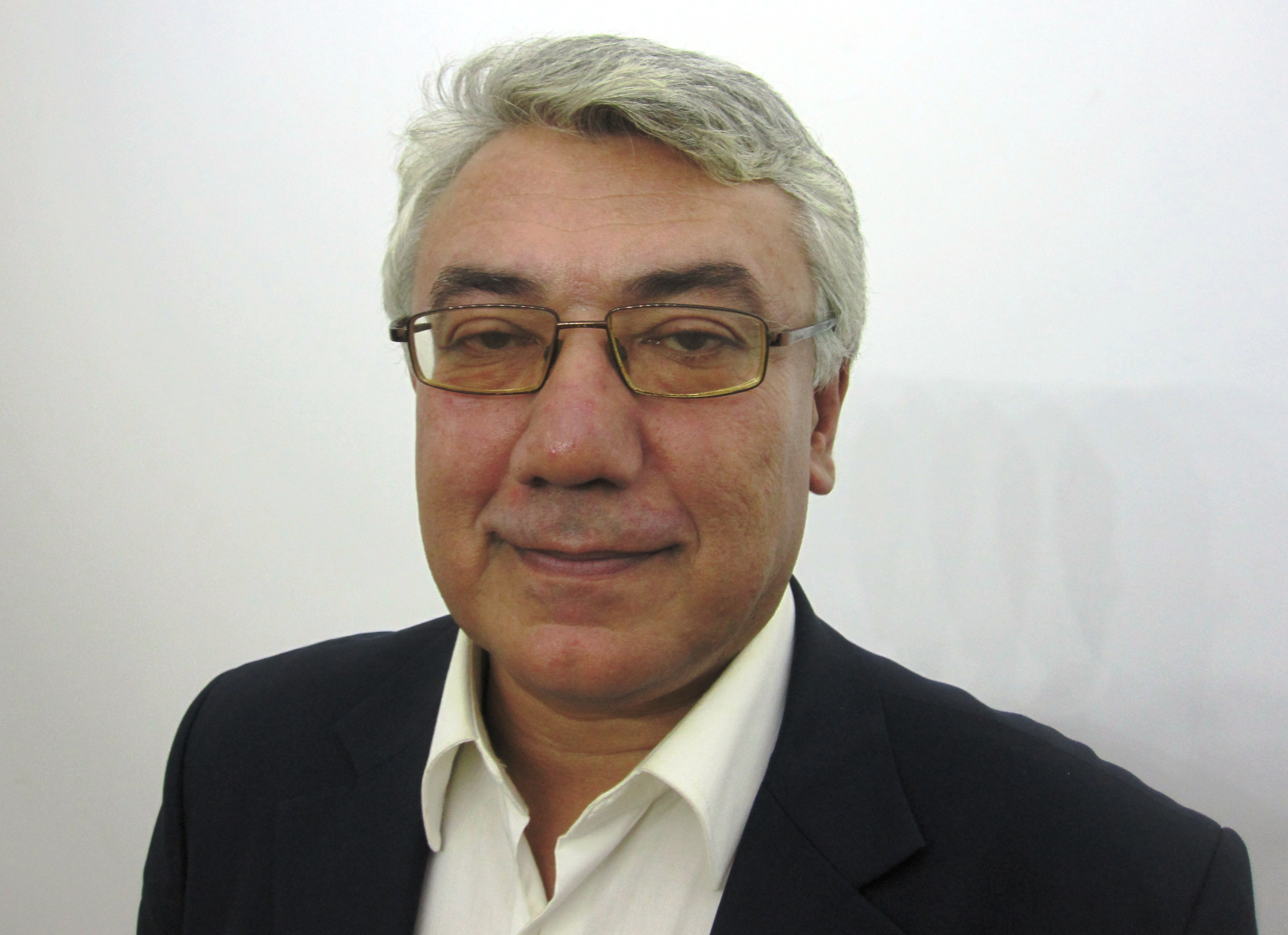

Aide to President of Azerbaijan
- In office 1993 – October 26, 1999
- President: Heydar Aliyev

Personal details
- Born: December 23, 1956 (age 69) Agstafa District, Azerbaijan SSR

Eldar Namazov Sagif oglu (Azerbaijani: Eldar Namazov Saqif oğlu; born on December 23, 1956) is a politician from Azerbaijan. He served as the head of the Presidential Administration of Azerbaijan Republic and the Presidential aide to Heydar Aliyev.

== Early life ==
Namazov was born on December 23, 1956, in Agstafa District of Azerbaijan. In 1974-1979, he studied at the Azerbaijan Pedagogical University in Baku. He then studied at the Institute of Anthropology and Ethnography in Moscow from 1981 through 1985, obtaining PhD in History.

== Political career ==
In late 1980s, he became more involved in political activities in Azerbaijan. Since 1993, he served as the head of the Presidential Administration and Presidential Aide to President Heydar Aliyev. In October 1999, Namazov resigned along with Presidential Advisor Vafa Guluzade and Minister of Foreign Affairs Tofig Zulfugarov as a sign of protest for unacceptable plan of resolution of Nagorno-Karabakh conflict which included a territorial swap between Azerbaijan and Armenia with Azerbaijan recognizing de facto rule of Armenia of Nagorno-Karabakh and Armenia ceding Meghri corridor allowing the physical link between Azerbaijan's exclave of Nakhichevan with Azerbaijan proper.

Starting from 2001, he's been serving as the President of social forum In the name of Azerbaijan, conducting political analysis for foreign policy of Azerbaijan, research on national security issues, conflict resolution, political and economic reforms in the country. He is also the founder of Center for International and Strategic Studies and had served as a deputy of National Assembly of Azerbaijan.

In April 2005 before Azerbaijani parliamentary elections, Namazov co-founded an opposition bloc called New Politics (Yeni Siyasət - YeS) along with Etibar Mammadov, leader and former chairman of the Azerbaijan National Independence Party, Lala Shevket, the leader of Azerbaijan Liberal Party, Ali Masimov, Prime Minister of Azerbaijan under the late President Abulfaz Elchibey and Eldeniz Guliyev, chairman of the Intelligentsia Movement. The bloc was to be an alternative to traditional opposition presenting other options to voters dissatisfied with usual opposition candidates.

Namazov is fluent in English, Russian and Turkish.

== See also ==
- Politics of Azerbaijan
