= Araz Azimov =

Azerbaijani diplomat (born 1962)

Araz Azimov Azerbaijani: Araz Əzimov
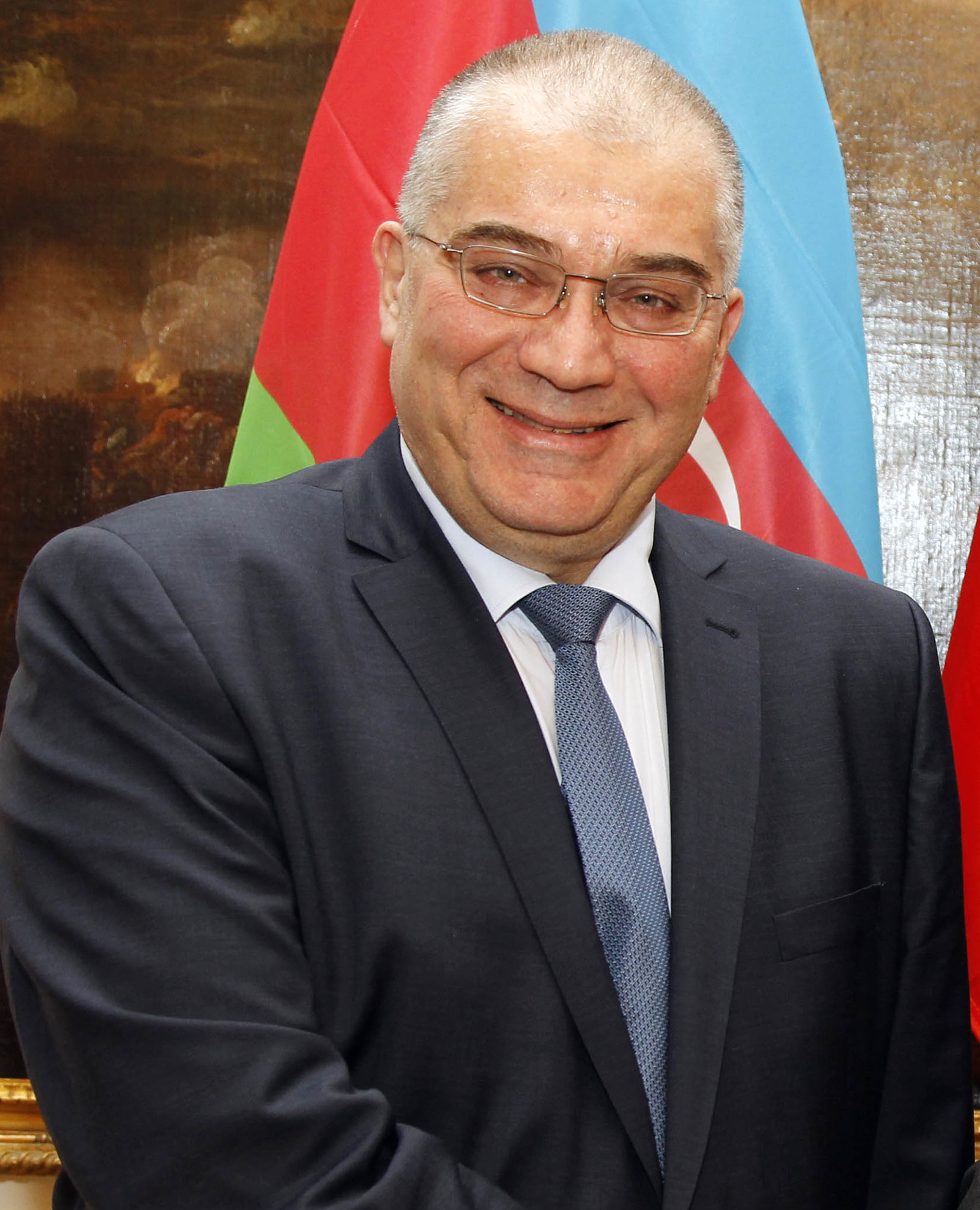

Deputy Minister of Foreign Affairs of Azerbaijan
- Incumbent
- Assumed office 1994
- President: Heydar Aliyev (1994-2003), Ilham Aliyev (2003-present)

Personal details
- Born: 13 June 1962 (age 63) Baku, Azerbaijan SSR, Soviet Union (now Azerbaijan)

Araz Boyukagha oghlu Azimov (Azerbaijani: Araz Böyükağa oğlu Əzimov, born 13 June 1962, Baku), is the Deputy Minister of Foreign Affairs of the Government of Azerbaijan, a position he has held since 1994.

== Early life ==
Azimov was born in Baku, Azerbaijan on 13 June 1962. From 1978 to 1984, he studied at the Oriental Studies faculty of Azerbaijan State University, now Baku State University, where he majored in Persian language studies. After graduation, he was an announcer in the Foreign Service department of the Azerbaijan State Teleradio Company, where he served until 1989, during which time he was also a military translator in Afghanistan.

== Political career ==
Azimov started his diplomatic career in the Ministry of Foreign Affairs of the Azerbaijani SSR in 1989. He served there as a second and first secretary at the Department of Information until 1991. In 1991 and 1992, Azimov was deputy director at the same department. In 1992, he was appointed director of the Department of International Organizations in the Ministry. From 1994 until the present, he has been Deputy Foreign Minister in the Ministry of Foreign Affairs of Azerbaijan. His diplomatic rank is Ambassador Extraordinary and Plenipotentiary. He was awarded the For service to the Fatherland Order (2nd class) of Azerbaijan by President Ilham Aliyev in July 2019.

== Personal life ==
Azimov is married and has one child. In addition to his native Azerbaijani, he speaks fluent English, Russian, Persian and Turkish.

== Attention in American media ==
Azimov received attention in the American media in 2011 in a Forbes magazine article. The article asserts that Samir Sharifov and George Soros were engaging in political activity that could "push the region toward war." Mr. Azimov is quoted in the article as saying that Soros' involvement with Sharifov might push the region toward war: "Armenia is interested in war, more so than Azerbaijan. They want to gain further justification of the occupation in Karabakh, so they would be looking for an opportunity to provoke. So war is a possibility but it will only start with a provocation."
