= Arif Heydarov =

Soviet Azerbaijani government and law enforcement official

- Arif Heydərov

Minister of Internal Affairs
- In office 24 March 1970 – 29 June 1978
- Preceded by: Mammad Alizade
- Succeeded by: Jafar Valiyev

Personal details
- Born: 28 June 1926 Aghdash, Azerbaijan SSR, USSR
- Died: 29 June 1978 (aged 52) Baku, Azerbaijan SSR, USSR
- Resting place: Alley of Honor
- Party: CPSU
- Parent: Nazar Heydarov

Arif Nazar oglu Heydarov (Azerbaijani: Arif Nəzər oğlu Heydərov, 28 June 1926 – 29 June 1978) was a Soviet Azerbaijani government and law enforcement official. He held the rank of General-Lieutenant and served as the Minister of Internal Affairs of the Azerbaijan SSR from 1970 until his assassination in office on 29 June 1978.

== Biography ==
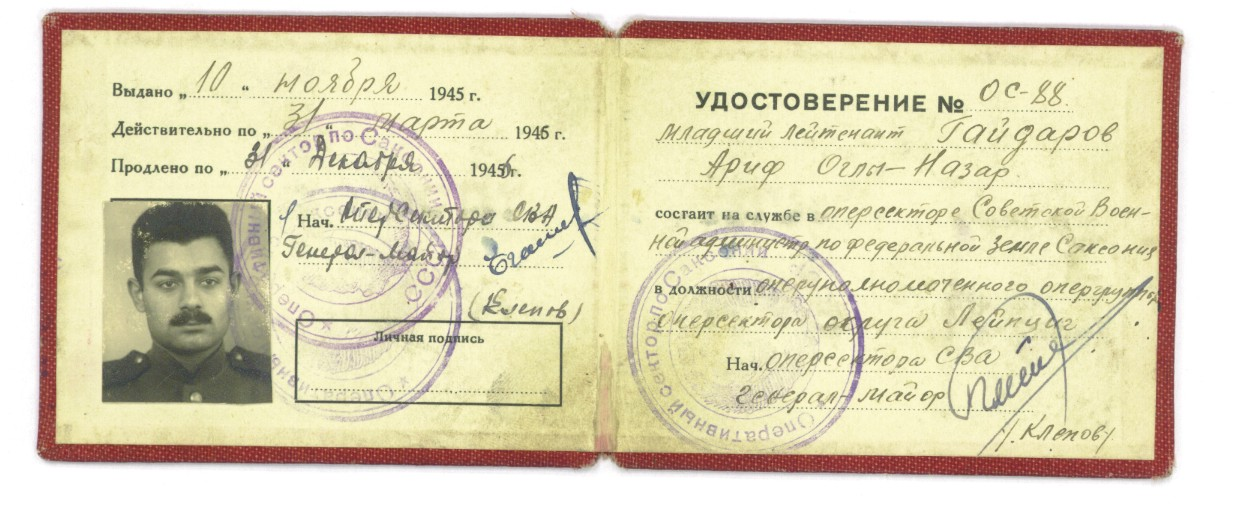
Service ID of Junior Lieutenant Arif Heydarov in the Soviet Military Administration, 1945.

Arif Heydarov was born on 28 June 1926. He began his career in law enforcement in 1943, at the age of 17, when he joined the Intelligence Unit of the People's Commissariat for State Security of the USSR. After completing training at the Special Tasks State Security School in Moscow, he volunteered for combat operations in World War II, serving in field intelligence units in Poland and Germany. After the end of the war, Arif Heydarov worked for the operational department of the Soviet military in Leipzig until September 1946, and then in Saxony until 1947.

Unconfirmed reports suggest that he was nominated for the title of Hero of the Soviet Union for his role in the Vistula–Oder offensive of 1945, though he ultimately received the Order of the Red Banner.

From 1944 to 1970, Heydarov worked in various positions as operative officer in the intelligence units in State Security Committee Azerbaijan (then KGB). His last operative position was reportedly deputy chief of station in Turkey, where he was allegedly responsible for foreign counterintelligence activities. In March 1970, he was appointed Minister of Internal Affairs of the Azerbaijan SSR by the then-leader of Azerbaijan, Heydar Aliyev.

== Assassination ==
On June 29, 1978, Arif Heydarov was fatally shot in his office in Baku by Ziya Muradov, a prison officer from Shusha, who also critically wounded the Deputy Minister of Internal Affairs, Major General Salahaddin Kazimov. According to the investigation, Muradov had originally intended to target Kazimov due to a reportedly prolonged delay in the consideration of his promotion request. Before entering Heydarov’s office, where an internal meeting was underway, Muradov killed the minister’s assistant, Colonel Aziz Safikhanov. Kazimov happened to be present at the meeting when Muradov opened fire, reportedly shooting him three times. One of the participants, Colonel Ibrahimov, fled the scene without attempting to intervene. He later testified about the sequence of shots but was unable to provide further details, having escaped immediately. According to some sources, Heydarov attempted to disarm Muradov and was shot during the confrontation. Muradov then fatally shot himself. Heydarov, gravely wounded, was taken to a hospital but died later that day. He was buried in the Alley of Honor in Baku, next to the grave of his father.

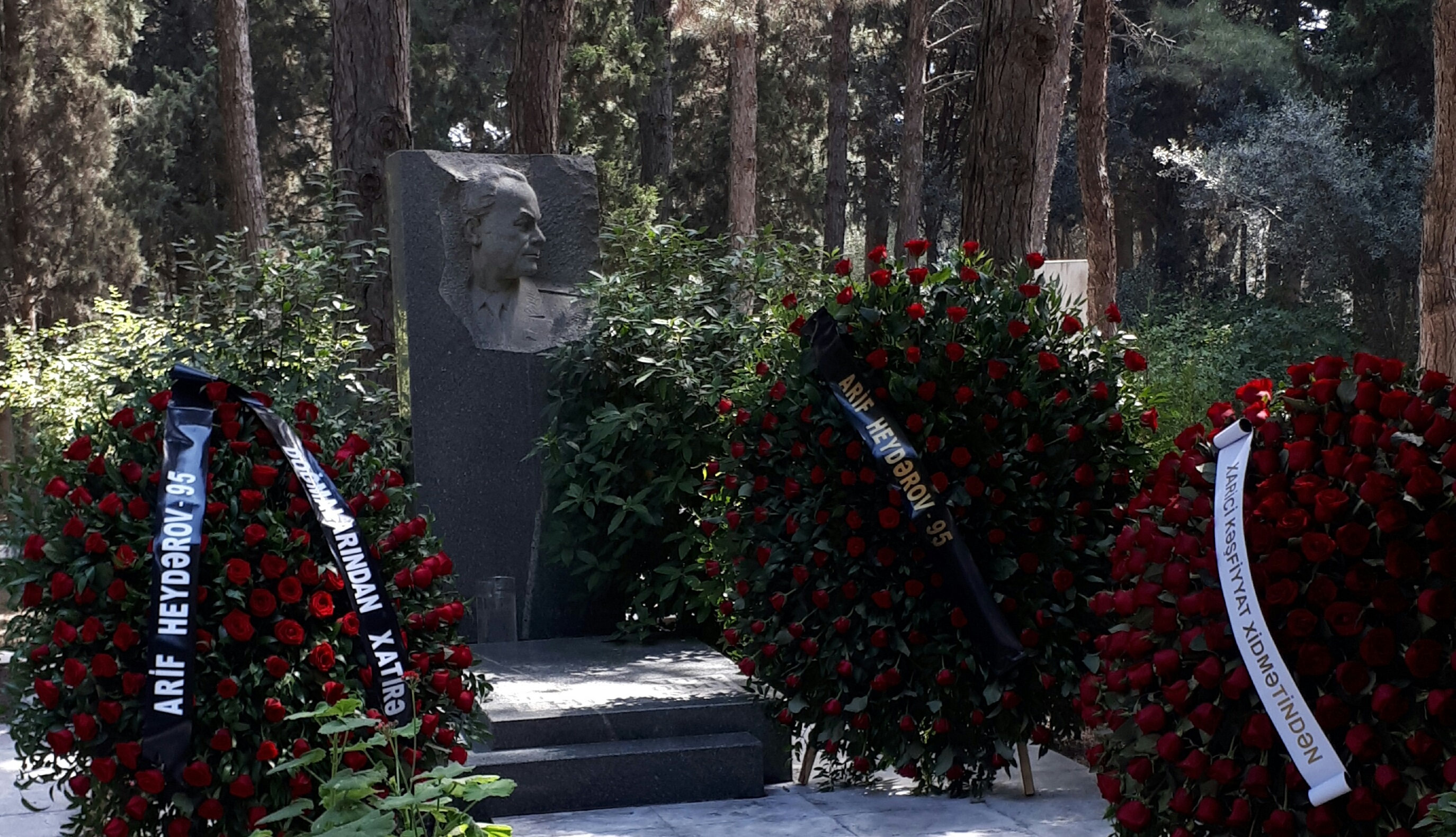
The Alley of Honor cemetery in Baku, monument to Arif Heydarov

== Personal life ==
Arif Heydarov maintained a close personal and professional relationship with Heydar Aliyev, with whom he studied at Azerbaijan State University from 1951–1957 and collaborated within the security services in 1950–1960s. The promotion of Arif Heydarov to the Minister position was initiated and realized by Heydar Aliyev.

His father, Nazar Heydarov, served as Chairman of the Presidium of the Supreme Soviet of the Azerbaijan SSR from 1949 to 1954. In 1963, Arif Heydarov married Adila Heydarova (1935–2015). They had three children: daughter Leyla and sons Murad and Magsud.

He was fluent in German, Russian, Turkish, and Persian, with working knowledge of English. In the 1950s, he became a two-time champion of Azerbaijan in rowing.

== Legacy ==
A number of institutions and locations in Azerbaijan are named in Arif Heydarov's honor, including a street in Baku, the Ministry of Internal Affairs Hospital, the Police Academy, and a frontier post in Astara operated by the State Border Service.

While speaking at the ceremony devoted to the 70th anniversary of Arif Heydarov on June 28, 1996, Heydar Aliyev called him "the General of the people of Azerbaijan" and noted that "his death became a big loss for our people, our republic and my personal loss. On the day of his death entire Azerbaijan was on a deep mourning".

== See also ==
- Minister of Internal Affairs of Azerbaijan

== Sources ==
- Azerbaijani Soviet Encyclopedia
- (in Russian)MIA.gov.az

Preceded by Mammad Alizade	Head of Ministry of Internal Affairs of Azerbaijan; 1970 – 1978	Succeeded by Jafar Valiyev
