= Maharram Mammadyarov =

Azerbaijani chemist (1924–2022)

Maharram Mammadyarov Məhərrəm Məmmədyarov
- Born: 17 October 1924; Yayji, Julfa District, Nakhichivan ASSR, Azerbaijan SSR, Soviet Union
- Died: 2 January 2022 (aged 97); Baku, Azerbaijan
- Citizenship: Azerbaijan
- Spouse: Izida Ibrahimbeyova
- Children: Ayaz Mammadyarov, Elmar Mammadyarov
- Awards: Sharaf Order
- Scientific career
- Fields: Oil Chemistry
- Institutions: Azerbaijan National Academy of Sciences

Maharram Ali oghlu Mammadyarov (Azerbaijani: Məhərrəm Əli oğlu Məmmədyarov; 17 October 1924 – 2 January 2022) was an Azerbaijani scientist, doctor of chemistry, real member of Azerbaijan National Academy of Sciences.

== Biography ==
Maharram Mammadyarov was born in Yayji, Julfa District, Nakhichivan ASSR, Azerbaijan SSR. In 1941, he graduated from Nakhchivan Pedagogical Technical School. He participated in WWII, serving in the Army. Mammadyarov graduated from Azerbaijan State University in 1949, and in 1953 from Leningrad Technical University by obtaining PhD. During 1953–1955, he worked as scientific secretary at Institute of Chemistry of Azerbaijan of National Academy of Sciences of Azerbaijan Soviet Socialist Republic. In 1955–1959 he was Senior Research Fellow at the Institute of Organic Chemistry named after N. Zelinski of the USSR Academy of Sciences. In 1959–1969 Mammadyarov worked at the Institute of Petrochemical Processes named after Y.H. Mammadaliyev. In 1973–1979 he was the head of Nakhchivan regional scientific center of ANAS. For his work on the use of carbon dioxide in the industry, he was awarded the State Prize of the Republic of Azerbaijan. In 1975–1978 Mammadyarov worked as teacher at the Nakhchivan State Pedagogical Institute (present Nakhchivan State University). From 1981 to 1994 he worked as the head of the department, and from 1994 to 2002 he worked as director of the Microbiology Institute of ANAS. Since 1969 he had been working at the Institute of Petrochemical Processes named after Y.H. Mammadaliyev as the Head of Synthesis and Technology of Synthetic Fats laboratory until his death in 2022.

Mammadyarov died on 2 January 2022, at the age of 97. He was the father of Minister of Foreign Affairs of Azerbaijan, Elmar Mammadyarov.

== Awards ==
- 1st degree order of the Great Patriotic War
- State Prize of the Republic of Azerbaijan (1980)
- Y. Mammadaliyev medal (1995)
- Shohrat Order (2005)
- "OGS" golden medal and diploma (2006)
- Honorary title of Honored Scientist (2009)
- Y. Mammadaliyev prize (2014)
- Sharaf Order (2014)
