= Khalaf Khalafov =

Azerbaijani diplomat

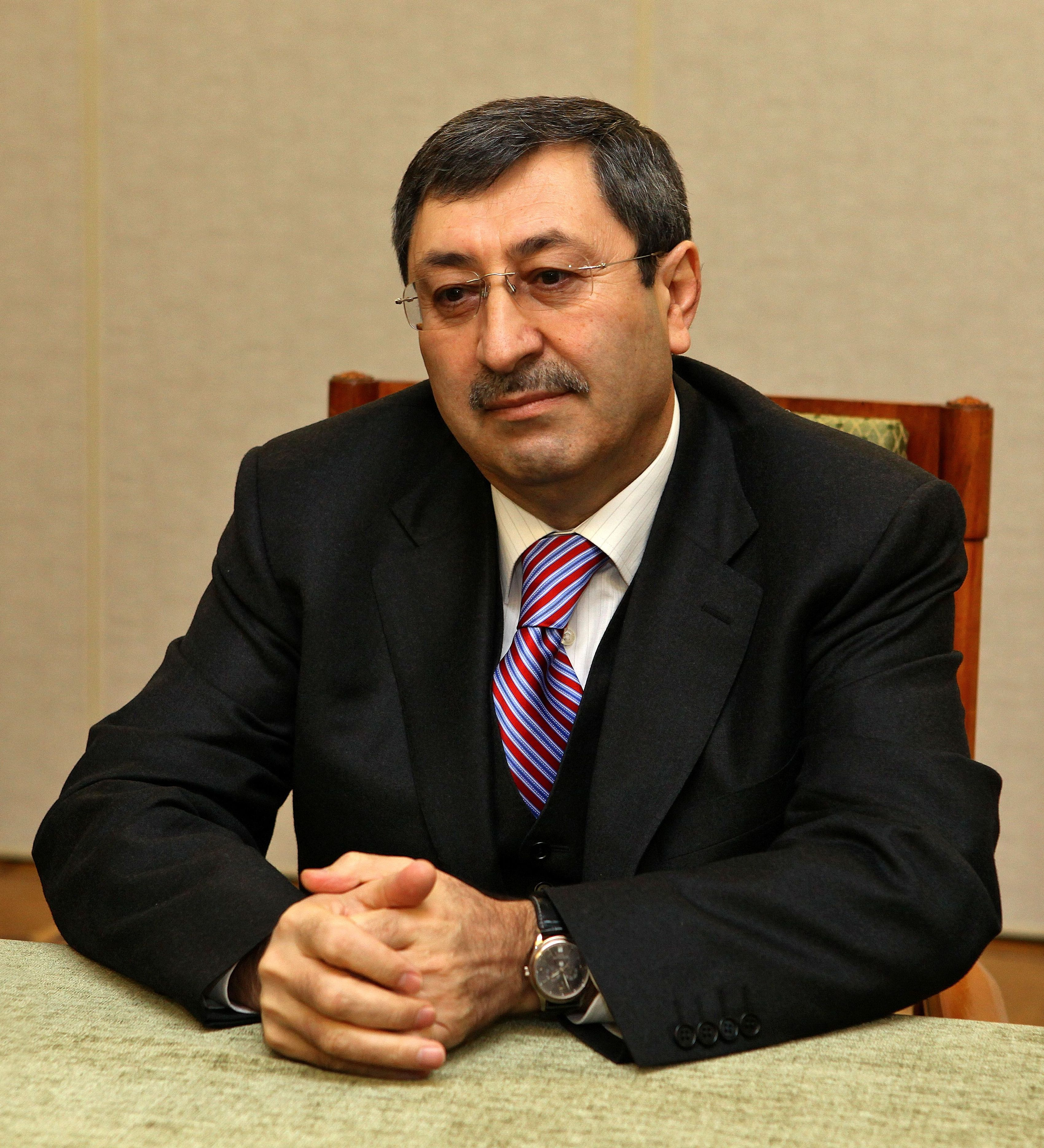
Khalaf Khalafov

Khalaf Khalafov (Azerbaijani: Xalaf Xalafov) is an Azerbaijani diplomat who has been serving as the Representative of the President of the Republic of Azerbaijan on Special Assignments since 2023. Previously, he served as Deputy Foreign Minister of Azerbaijan from 1997 to 2018 and from 2019 to 2023.

== Life ==
Khalaf Khalafov was born on September 21, 1959, Armenia SSR. He studied International law at Taras Shevchenko National University of Kyiv in 1977–1982. He continued his education at the Diplomatic Academy of the Ministry of Foreign Affairs of the USSR in 1990–1991. He is married and has two children. He speaks German and Russian.

== Career ==
Khalafov worked in the Ministry of Internal Affairs of Azerbaijani SSR as an Inspector, Head of Division in 1983–1990. He started his diplomatic career at the Ministry of Foreign Affairs of Azerbaijan in 1991. He served there as Second secretary of the Consular Department in 1991–1992, Head of the Treaty and Legal Department in 1992–1997, and Deputy Minister of Foreign Affairs of Azerbaijan in the period of 1997–2018. In 2018–2019, he served as the Chief of Office of the Cabinet of Ministers of the Republic of Azerbaijan. On May 3, 2019, Khalaf Khalafov was appointed the Special Representative of the President of Azerbaijan for border and the Caspian Sea issues. Since May 2019, he served as the Deputy Minister of Foreign Affairs of Azerbaijan. On July 24, 2023, he was appointed the Representative of the President of Azerbaijan on Special Assignments.

== Awards ==
- Azerbaijan – Ambassador Extraordinary and Plenipotentiary of Azerbaijan (2002);
- Azerbaijan – Honored Lawyer of the Republic of Azerbaijan (2009);
- Poland – Officer's Cross of the Order of Merit (2009).
- Azerbaijan – First degree State Counselor (2018);
- Azerbaijan – Order "For Service to the Fatherland" of the second degree (2019);
- Russia – Badge "For contribution to international cooperation" of MFA of RF (2019)
