= Nehrəxəlil =

Nehrakhalil
- Municipality
- Azerbaijani: Nehrəxəlil
- Location within Azerbaijan
- Coordinates: 40°34′45″N 47°27′10″E
- Country: Azerbaijan
- District: Agdash

Population
  - Total: 1,262
- Time zone: UTC+4 (AZT)
  - Summer (DST): UTC+5 (AZT)

Nehrəxəlil (also, Nehrakhalil) is a village and municipality in the Agdash District of Azerbaijan. It has a population of 1,262.

== Notable natives ==
- Fariz Safarov — Hero of the Soviet Union.
