= Salahaddin Kazimov =

Soviet Azerbaijani major general of Internal Troops and politician

- Salahəddin Həsən oğlu Kazımov
- Born: December 22, 1920; Zaqatala, Azerbaijan SSR
- Died: July 2, 1978 (aged 57); Baku, Azerbaijan SSR, Soviet Union
- Burial place: Alley of Honor
- Military career
- Allegiance: Soviet Union
- Branch: Red Army (1941–1945); Internal Troops (1945–1978)
- Service years: 1941–1978
- Rank: Major general (Internal Troops)
- Nickname: Kakagha (by Kurds)
- Unit: 8th Rifle Division
- Conflicts: World War II; Battle of Kursk; Battle of the Dnieper; Prague Offensive
- Awards: Hero of the Soviet Union Order of Lenin; Order of the Red Banner; Order of Alexander Nevsky Order of the Red Star (2)

Deputy Minister of Internal Affairs of the Azerbaijan SSR
- In office 1970 – 2 July 1978
- Minister: Arif Heydarov

Salahaddin Hasan oglu Kazimov (Azerbaijani: Salahəddin Həsən oğlu Kazımov; 22 December 1920 – 2 July 1978) was a Soviet Internal Troops Major general and a Hero of the Soviet Union. Kazimov was awarded the title Hero of the Soviet Union on 16 October 1943 for his leadership of an artillery battalion during the Battle of the Dnieper. In a twelve-day period during the battle, his battalion's guns were reported to have killed up to 180 German soldiers and destroyed eleven tanks. Postwar, Kazimov served in the Internal Troops and became Deputy Minister of Internal Affairs of the Azerbaijan SSR. Kazimov and Minister of Internal Affairs Arif Heydarov were shot by an officer of the Shusha prison. He was wounded in an armed attack on the Ministry of Internal Affairs of the Azerbaijan SSR and died on July 2, 1978.

== Early life ==
Kazimov was born on 22 December 1920 in either Zaqatala or the village of Kaas to a teacher's family. His ethnicity is given as either Tsakhur, Azerbaijani, or Kurdish. He graduated from the Physics and Mathematics department of the Azerbaijan Pedagogical Institute in Baku.

== World War II ==
In 1941, Kazimov was drafted into the Red Army. In 1942 he graduated from an accelerated course at the Tbilisi Artillery School. He fought in combat from April 1942. In 1943 he joined the Communist Party of the Soviet Union. He became a battery commander in the 8th Rifle Division's 62nd Artillery Regiment. Kazimov fought in the Battle of Kursk and was awarded the Order of the Red Banner on 14 July for his actions.

During the crossing of the Dnieper on the night of 22 September, near the village of Navozy, Kazimov's battery destroyed German firing points, enabling the crossing. On 23 September the battery crossed the Dnieper near the village of Verkhniye Zhary, where it fought in the expansion of the bridgehead. In a twelve-day battle for the bridgehead his guns reportedly destroyed eleven German tanks and killed up to 180 soldiers. On 16 October 1943, Kazimov was awarded the title Hero of the Soviet Union and the Order of Lenin.

In early 1944, Kazimov was appointed commander of a division (artillery battalion). By this time he had reached the rank of captain. He fought in battles in Poland. Kazimov transferred to the 256th Artillery Regiment of the 9th Rifle Division By late spring, he fought in the Prague Offensive. On 9 May, Kazimov was wounded and evacuated to a hospital. On 10 June he was awarded the Order of Alexander Nevsky.

== Postwar ==
Postwar, Kazimov served in the Internal Troops. Between 1956 and 1960 he was chief of staff of a convoy escort division of the Internal Troops. On 30 December 1956 he was awarded the Order of the Red Star. Kazimov reached the rank of Major general and became Deputy Minister of Internal Affairs of the Azerbaijan SSR. On June 29, 1978, he and Minister of Internal Affairs Arif Heydarov were shot in Heydarov's office by Shusha prison officer Zia Muradov. Kazimov was wounded and died on July 2. Kazimov was buried in the Alley of Honor in Baku.

== Memorial ==
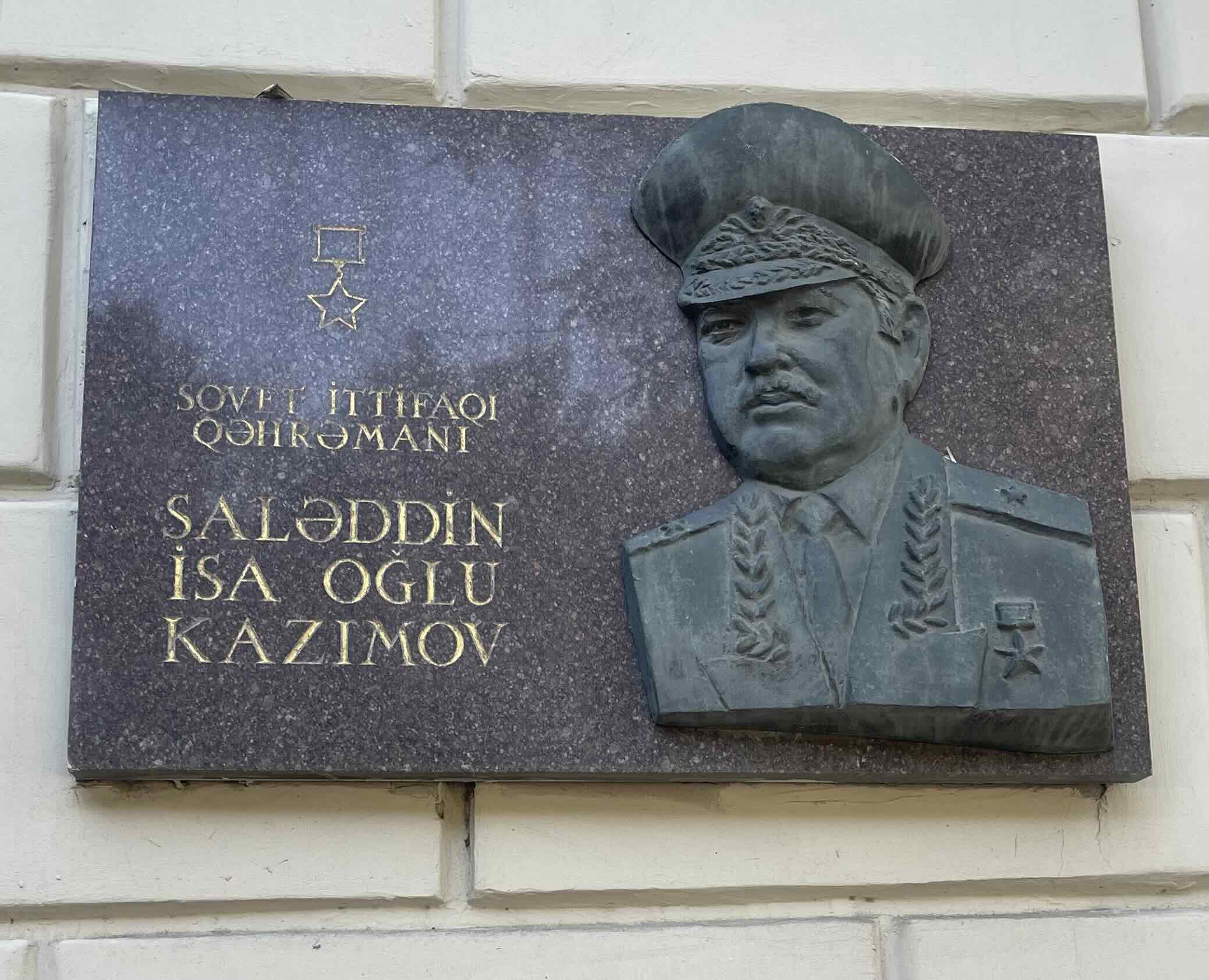

In Baku, a plaque honoring Kazimov is located on a building side at the intersection of Samad Vergun and Ənvər Qasımzadə. It is located one block from the Monument to Richard Sorge, another Hero of the Soviet Union.
