= Ləki =

- Municipality
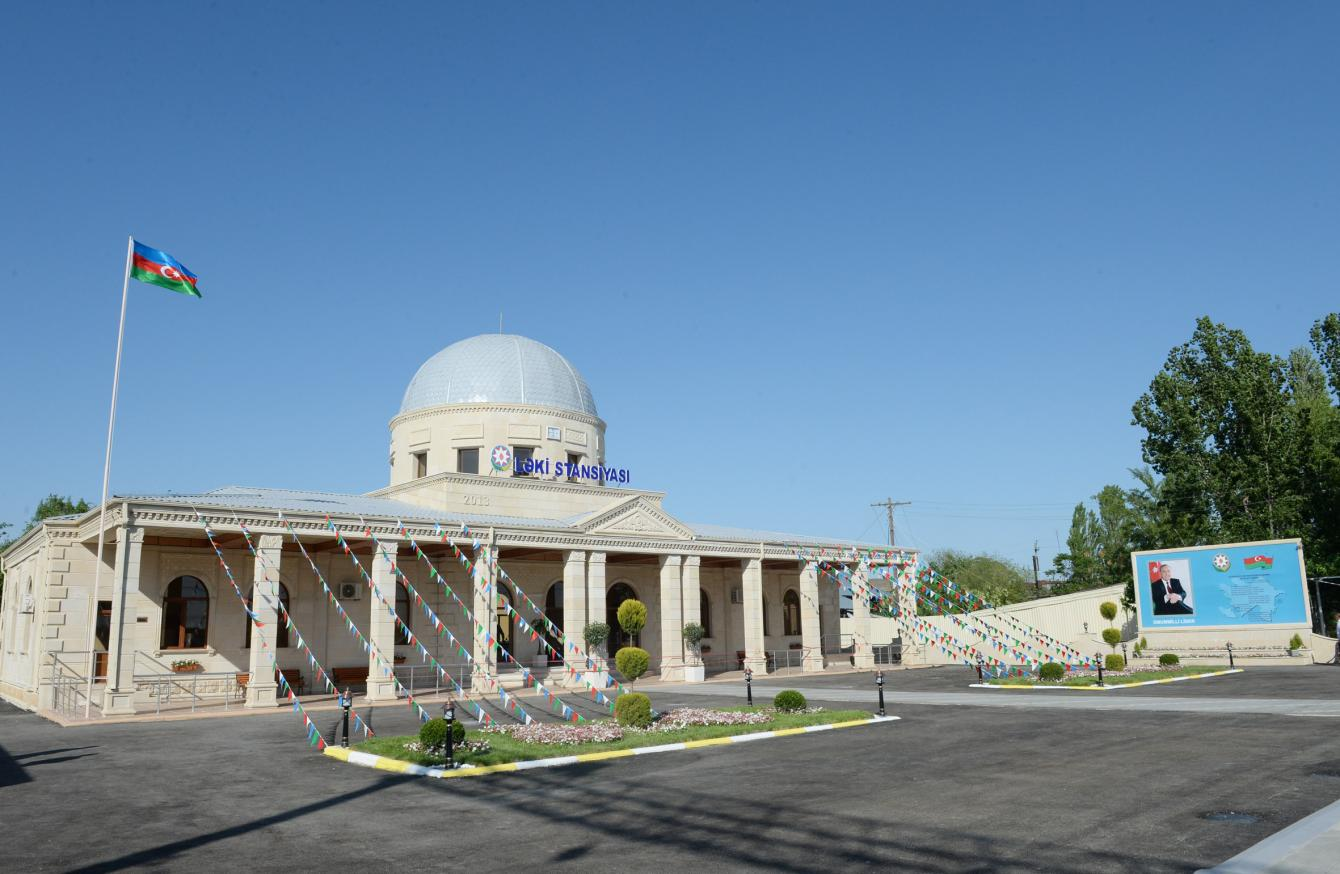
- Laki Railway Station

- Location within Azerbaijan
- Coordinates: 40°33′15″N 47°25′34″E
- Country: Azerbaijan
- Rayon: Agdash

Population (2008)
  - Total: 3,941
- Time zone: UTC+4 (AZT)
  - Summer (DST): UTC+5 (AZT)

Ləki (also, Lyaki) is a village and municipality in the Agdash Rayon of Azerbaijan. It has a population of 3,941.

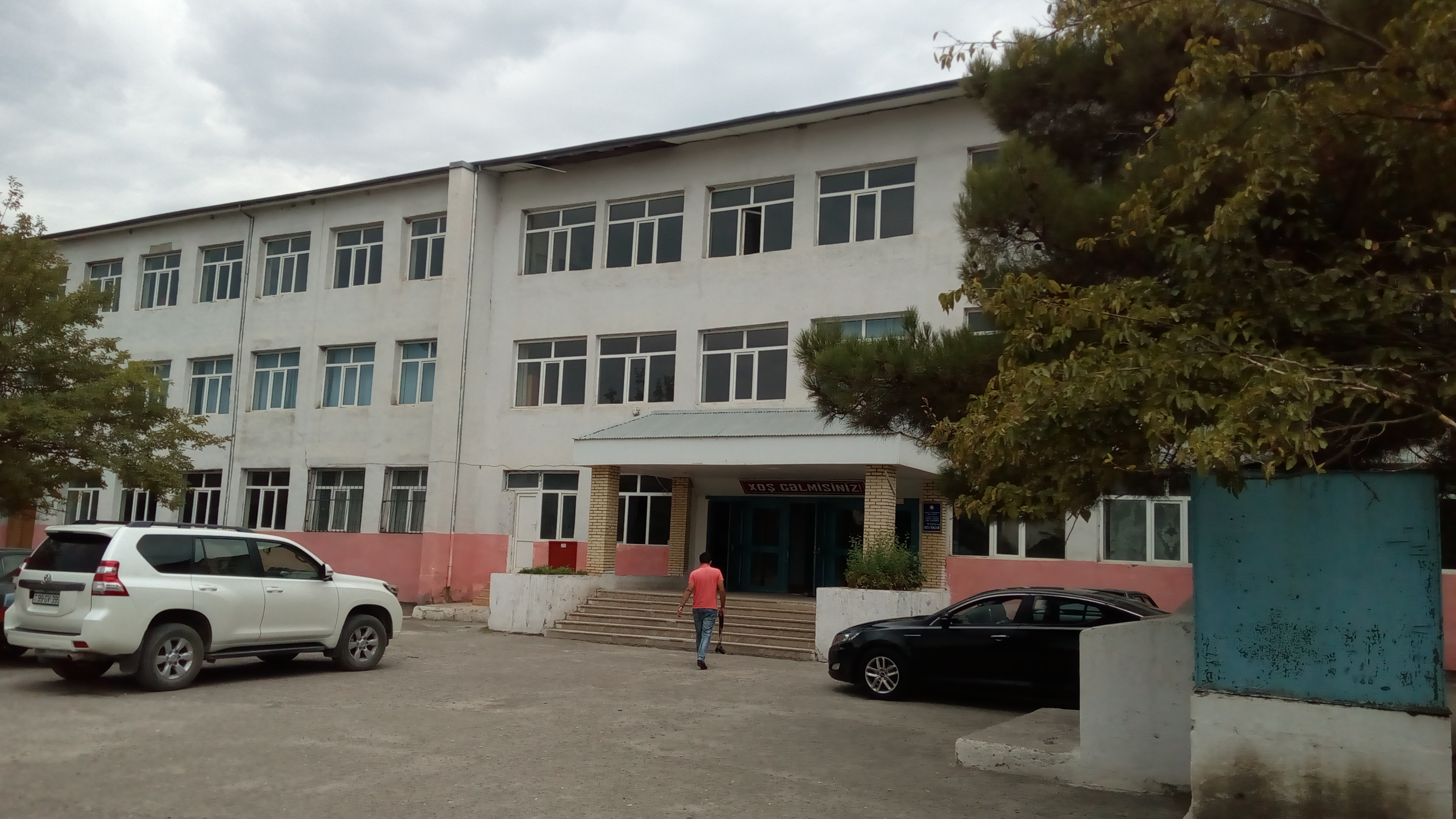
School in Laki

== Notable natives ==
- Tofig Gasimov — Minister of Foreign Affairs of Azerbaijan (1992-1993).

== See also ==
- Aşağı Ləki
- Yuxarı Ləki
