= Fariz Safarov =

Azerbaijani Soviet Army major (1920–1946)

- Born: 20 June 1920; Nehrakhalil, Areshsky Uyezd, Ganja Governorate, Azerbaijan SSR
- Died: 27 August 1964 (aged 44); Baku, Azerbaijan SSR, Soviet Union
- Military career
- Allegiance: Soviet Union
- Branch: Soviet Army
- Service years: 1939–57
- Rank: Major
- Unit: 25th Guards Rifle Division
- Conflicts: World War II; Battle of the Dnieper
- Awards: Hero of the Soviet Union

Fariz Majid oghlu Safarov (Azerbaijani: Fariz Məcid oğlu Səfərov; 20 June 1920 – 27 August 1964) was an Azerbaijani Soviet Army Major and Hero of the Soviet Union. Drafted into the Red Army in 1939, Safarov fought in combat from 1942. He reached the rank of Senior Sergeant by September 1943 and led a machine gun crew in the Battle of the Dnieper. For his reported actions, including taking command of his company after the commander was wounded, Safarov received the title Hero of the Soviet Union. He continued to serve postwar and retired in 1957 with the rank of major. He worked in Baku and died in 1964.

== Early life ==
Safarov was born on 20 June 1920 in Nehrəxəlil to a peasant family. He received secondary education and graduated from a training course for Russian language teachers in Baku. He then worked as a teacher. In 1939, Safarov was drafted into the Red Army.

== World War II ==
Safarov fought on the front from 1942. In 1942, he joined the Communist Party of the Soviet Union. He was a senior sergeant leading a machine gun crew of the 78th Guards Rifle Regiment in the 25th Guards Rifle Division by September 1943. Safarov fought in the Battle of the Dnieper.

On the night of 26 September, he crossed the river with a small detachment at the village of Voyskovoye in Solone Raion. The group captured a bridgehead. In the morning German troops counterattacks and during one attack Safarov ran out of ammunition for his machine gun. When a German machine gunner reportedly approached the Soviet trench Safarov shot him and turned the machine gun around. To relieve Safarov's group, a rifle company was sent over the Dnieper. When the whole company had been landed, a stray bullet struck its commander. Safarov reportedly took command of the company itself and asked for reinforcements. The reinforcements encircled the German troops, who committed tanks in an effort to break out. Safarov's company reportedly destroyed five tanks. In this action, he was wounded but reportedly did not leave the battlefield. Safarov was awarded the Order of the Red Banner on 5 October. On 19 March 1944 he was awarded the title Hero of the Soviet Union and the Order of Lenin.

In 1944, Safarov graduated from the Krasnodar Machine Gun-Mortar School.

== Postwar ==
Safarov continued to serve in the military after the end of the war. In 1957 he retired with the rank of major. He lived in Baku. Safarov died on 27 August 1964 and was buried in the Alley of Honor.
