= Elmira Gafarova =

Azerbaijani politician and diplomat

- Elmira Qafarova

Chairwoman of the Supreme Soviet of Azerbaijan
- In office 18 May 1990 – 5 March 1992
- President: Ayaz Mutallibov
- Preceded by: Suleyman Rustam
- Succeeded by: Yaqub Mammadov

Chairwoman of the Presidium of the Supreme Soviet of the Azerbaijan SSR
- In office 22 June 1989 – 18 May 1990
- Preceded by: Suleyman Tatliyev
- Succeeded by: Position abolished

Deputy Chairwoman of the Council of Ministers of the Azerbaijan SSR
- In office 22 December 1987 – 22 June 1989
- Premier: Hasan Seyidov; Ayaz Mutallibov

Minister of Foreign Affairs of Azerbaijan SSR
- In office 1 December 1983 – 22 December 1987
- Preceded by: Tahira Tahirova
- Succeeded by: Huseynagha Sadigov

Minister of Education of the Azerbaijan SSR
- In office 13 February 1980 – 1 December 1983
- Preceded by: Mehdi Mehdizade
- Succeeded by: Kamran Rahimov

Personal details
- Born: 1 March 1934 Baku, Azerbaijan SSR, Soviet Union
- Died: 1 August 1993 (aged 59) Baku, Azerbaijan

Elmira Mikayil gizi Gafarova (Note: Azerbaijani: Elmira Mikayıl qızı Qafarova / Елмира Микајыл гызы Гафарова, also spelled as Elmira Qafarova (Azerbaijani: Elmira Qafarova / Елмира Гафарова) (1 March 1934 – 1 August 1993) was an Azerbaijani politician and diplomat.

== Early life ==
Gafarova was born on 1 March 1934 in Baku, Azerbaijan. In 1952, she completed her secondary education and was admitted to Azerbaijan State University in 1953. In 1958, she graduated from the university with a degree in Philology and continued with her postgraduate studies until 1961 when she obtained her PhD in Philology. Gafarova was the deputy of the Komsomol committee of the university. In 1958, she was admitted to Azerbaijan Communist Party. In 1962, she was appointed the chairwoman of the Organization Committee Center of Azerbaijani Komsomol and served as the first secretary of the organization from 1966 to 1970.

== Political career ==
In 1970–1971, Gafarova worked as the director of the Department of Culture of the Central Committee of Azerbaijan Communist Party and from 1971 until 1980, she was the Secretary of the Party Committee of Baku. In 1980, she was appointed Minister of Education of Azerbaijan SSR, a position she held until 1983. In 1983–1987, Gafarova served as the Minister of Foreign Affairs of the Azerbaijan SSR. While in foreign service, she participated in UN General Assembly sessions in October 1984 on issues of racism and discrimination. She was also elected to the Supreme Soviet of Azerbaijan. From 1987 through 1991, she was the Speaker of Supreme Soviet of the Azerbaijan SSR and was elected deputy to the Supreme Soviet of the Soviet Union. In 1987–89, she also served as Deputy Prime Minister of the Azerbaijan SSR. When she was the speaker of parliament, Gafarova played a significant role in restoring the historic name of Ganja on 30 December 1989, and made the Nowruz, celebrated throughout Azerbaijan, an official public holiday on 13 March 1990. She is also credited with passing a law on restoration of independence of Azerbaijan on 18 October 1991 and admission of the Azerbaijan Republic to the United Nations on 2 March 1992.

=== Black January ===
Gafarova has been of the first leaders to convene the extraordinary session of the Azerbaijani Supreme Soviet on January 21–22 and condemn the Soviet authorities for massacre of civilians in Baku on the night of 19–20 January 1990. The session of 160 deputies issued a statement of condemnation of the massacre and appealed to Supreme Soviet of USSR, Supreme Soviets of union republics, all parliaments of the world and United Nations mentioning military aggression against civilians in disregard of Geneva and Vienna Conventions. As a result, Azerbaijani General Prosecutor's Office launched a criminal investigation on paragraphs 4 and 6 of article 94 (premeditated murder in aggravating circumstances), 149 (deliberately destroying or damaging the property), 168 (abuse of power) and 225 (abuse of authority) of the Criminal Code that was effective at that time. The ongoing investigation has not yet been closed.

== Awards ==
Gafarova has been awarded with various orders and medals of the USSR.[1She's been awarded with Order of the Red Banner of Labour and Order of Honor during her career.

Elmira Gafarova died on 1 August 1993 in Baku, Azerbaijan. She was buried in the Alley of Honor.

== See also ==
- Ministry of Foreign Affairs of Azerbaijan
