= Huseynagha Sadigov =

Azerbaijani politician and diplomat

Huseynagha Sadigov Hüseynağa Sadıqov
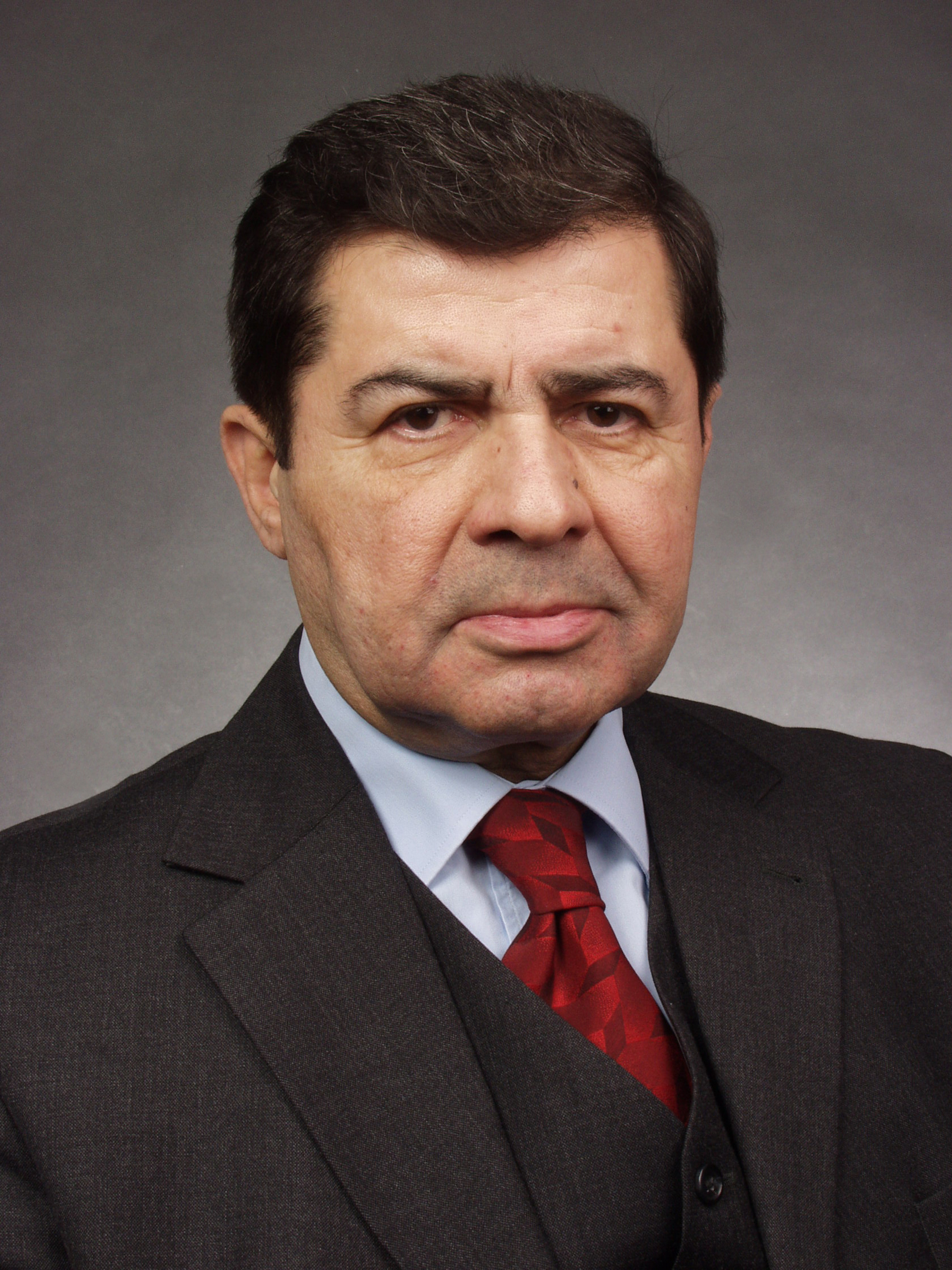

Minister of Foreign Affairs of Azerbaijan
- In office 23 January 1988 – 29 May 1992
- President: Kamran Bagirov (First Secretary of Azerbaijan Communist Party), Abdurrahman Vazirov (First Secretary of Azerbaijan Communist Party), Ayaz Mutalibov, Yagub Mammadov (acting), Abulfez Elchibey
- Preceded by: Elmira Qafarova
- Succeeded by: Tofig Gasimov

Personal details
- Born: 14 March 1940 (age 86) Baku, Azerbaijan SSR, USSR

Huseynagha Musa oghlu Sadigov (Azerbaijani: Hüseynağa Musa oğlu Sadıqov; born in 1940), also spelled as Huseynaga Sadikhov is an Azerbaijani politician and diplomat.

== Early life ==
Sadigov was born on 14 March 1940 in Baku, Azerbaijan. In 1963, he graduated from Azerbaijan University of Languages named after Mirza Fatali Akhundov with a degree in European languages. He continued his post graduate studies at the same university. At the same time, Sadigov worked as a translator and assistant director of the All Soviet Intourist Joint Stock Organization as well as the director of the Azerbaijani hotel complex which was being built at the time. In 1968, he completed international tourism courses at the Council of Ministers of the USSR.

== Political career ==
Starting from 1971, he worked in managerial positions at the Cabinet of Ministers of Azerbaijan SSR and Central Committee of Azerbaijan Communist Party. From 1974 until 1988, Sadigov joined the diplomatic service and worked at the embassy of USSR in Berlin (East Germany) and the consulates-general in Leipzig and Rostock (East Germany). From 1988 through 1991, he served as the Minister of Foreign Affairs of Azerbaijan SSR. After the declaration of independence of Azerbaijan in 1991, Sadigov was appointed the Minister of Foreign Affairs of Azerbaijan Republic. In 1989, he received the status of Advisor to Ambassador Extraordinary and Plenipotentiary of the 1st rank of USSR and in 1992 - the diplomatic status of Ambassador Extraordinary and Plenipotentiary of Republic of Azerbaijan. During his term in office, Sadigov was strong proponent of Azerbaijan cooperation with and eventual joining of NATO. The pro-western position of the country was declared by him on 4 December 1991, weeks before the official dissolution of Soviet Union. Mr. Sadigov headed the Azerbaijani delegation to the United Nations' forty-sixth plenary meeting of the General Assembly in March 1992, during which the Azerbaijan Republic became a member of the United Nations. He is the first Azerbaijani who has held a speech to the United Nations General Assembly. In 1992, he was replaced by Tofig Gasimov and appointed the ambassador to Germany, Switzerland, Belgium, the Netherlands, Luxembourg and Austria. His term ended in 2005.

== Works and awards ==
Sadigov authored more than 50 political articles in German and Azerbaijani media. In 2007, Huseynagha Sadigov was awarded with German Federal Cross of Merit for his service in developing the Azerbaijan-Germany relations.

== Personal life ==
Sadigov has two children. He is fluent in German, Arabic, Turkish and Russian.

== See also ==
- Ministry of Foreign Affairs of Azerbaijan
