= Alley of Honor =

Cemetery in Baku, Azerbaijan

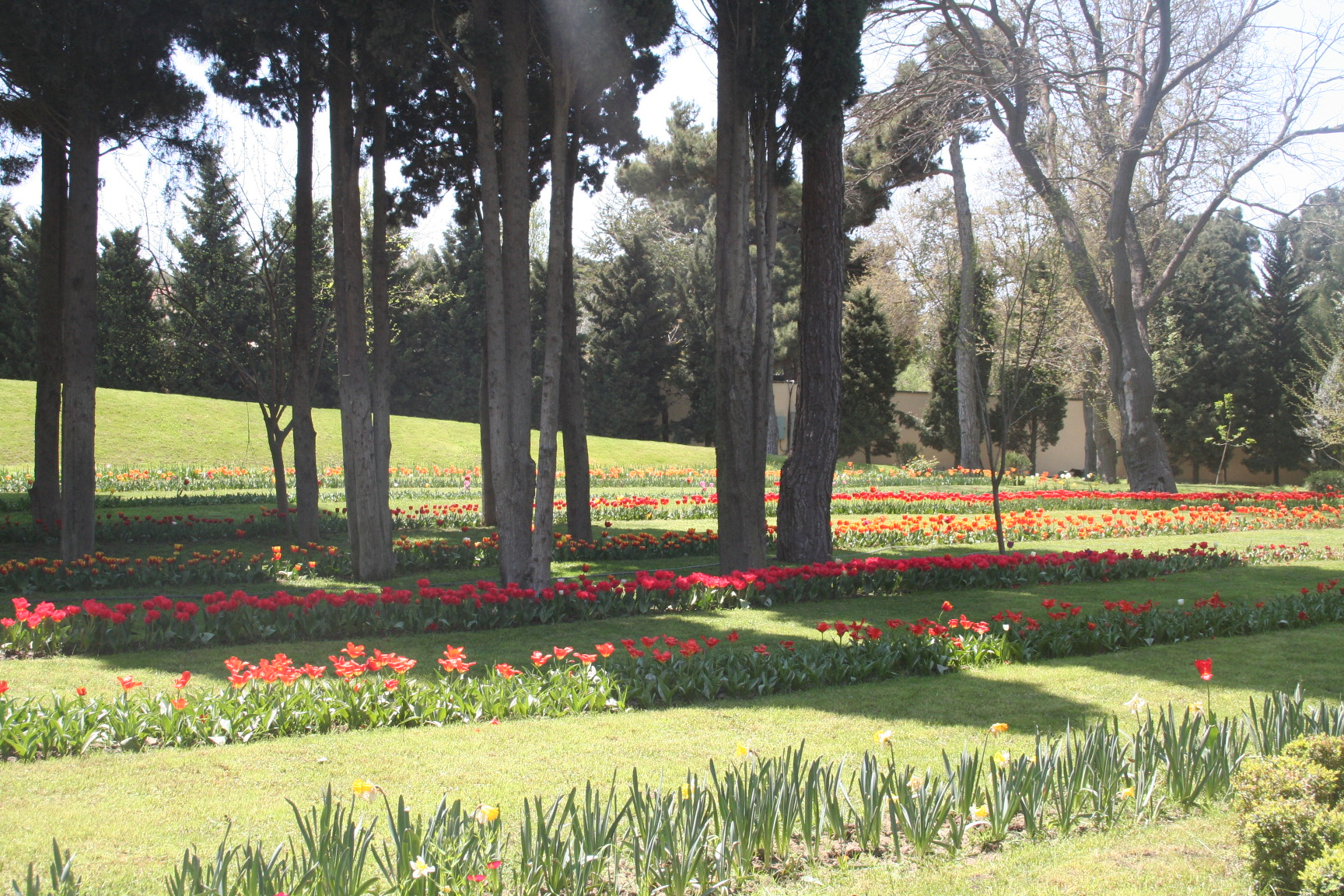
- Grave of Azerbaijani President Heydar Aliyev
- Interactive map of Alley of Honor

Details
- Established: 27 August 1948
- Location: Baku
- Country: Azerbaijan
- Coordinates: 40°21′42″N 49°49′15″E
- Type: Public
- No. of graves: 280+

The Alley of Honor (Azerbaijani: Fəxri Xiyaban, Honorary Allée) is a public cemetery and memorial in Baku, Azerbaijan. The Alley includes burials of famed Azerbaijanis and Azerbaijan-affiliated expatriates, including several Presidents, scientists, artists and members of the Aliyev family. There are over 280 burials in total.

== History ==
The Alley was established by the order of the Council of Ministers of Azerbaijan SSR on August 27, 1948. According to the list enclosed to the order, the burials of prominent Azerbaijani figures Jalil Mammadguluzade, Abdurrahim bey Hagverdiyev, Najaf bey Vazirov, Hasan bey Zardabi, Huseyn Arablinski, Suleyman Sani Akhundov, Ali Nazmi, Jabbar Garyagdioglu, Rustam Mustafayev, Azim Azimzade and Huseyngulu Sarabski had to be moved to the Alley of Honor and gravestones set to them.

== Notable interments ==
- Vasif Adigozalov (1935–2006), composer
- Mahmud Aliyev (1908–1958), Minister of Foreign Affairs
- Heydar Aliyev (1923–2003), 3rd President
- Alasgar Alakbarov (1910–1963), actor
- Shovkat Alakbarova (1922–1993), singer
- Fikret Amirov (1922–1984), composer
- Azim Azimzade (1880–1943), painter
- Leyla Badirbeyli (1920–1999), actress
- Ziya Bunyadov (1923–1997), Scholar and Parliamentarian
- Abulfaz Elchibey (1938–2000), 2nd President
- Valeh Barshadly (1927–1999), general and first Minister of Defense
- Rashid Behbudov (1915–1989), singer
- Bulbul (1897–1961), singer
- Vugar Gashimov (1986–2014), chess grandmaster
- Tofig Guliyev (1917–2000), composer
- Jafar Jabbarly (1899–1934), poet
- Uzeyir Hajibeyov (1885–1948), composer
- Elmira Qafarova (1934–1993), Minister of Foreign Affairs, Speaker of National Assembly
- Muslim Magomayev (1885–1937), composer
- Muslim Magomayev (1942–2008), Soviet singer
- Tahira Tahirova (1913–1991), diplomat and Minister of Foreign Affairs
- Rasul Rza (1910–1981), writer
- Khalil Rza Uluturk (1932–1994), poet
- Vagif Samadoghlu (1939–2015), poet
- Tofig Safaraliyev (1932–1983), statesman, Minister of Industrial Construction of the Azerbaijan SSR
- Abdulla Shaig (1881–1959), poet
- Seyid Shushinski (1889–1965) khananda
- Ismayil Shykhly (1919–1995) Azerbaijani writer
- Lotfi Zadeh (1921–2017), creator of Fuzzy Logic
- Hasan bey Zardabi (1842–1907), publicist

== Gallery ==
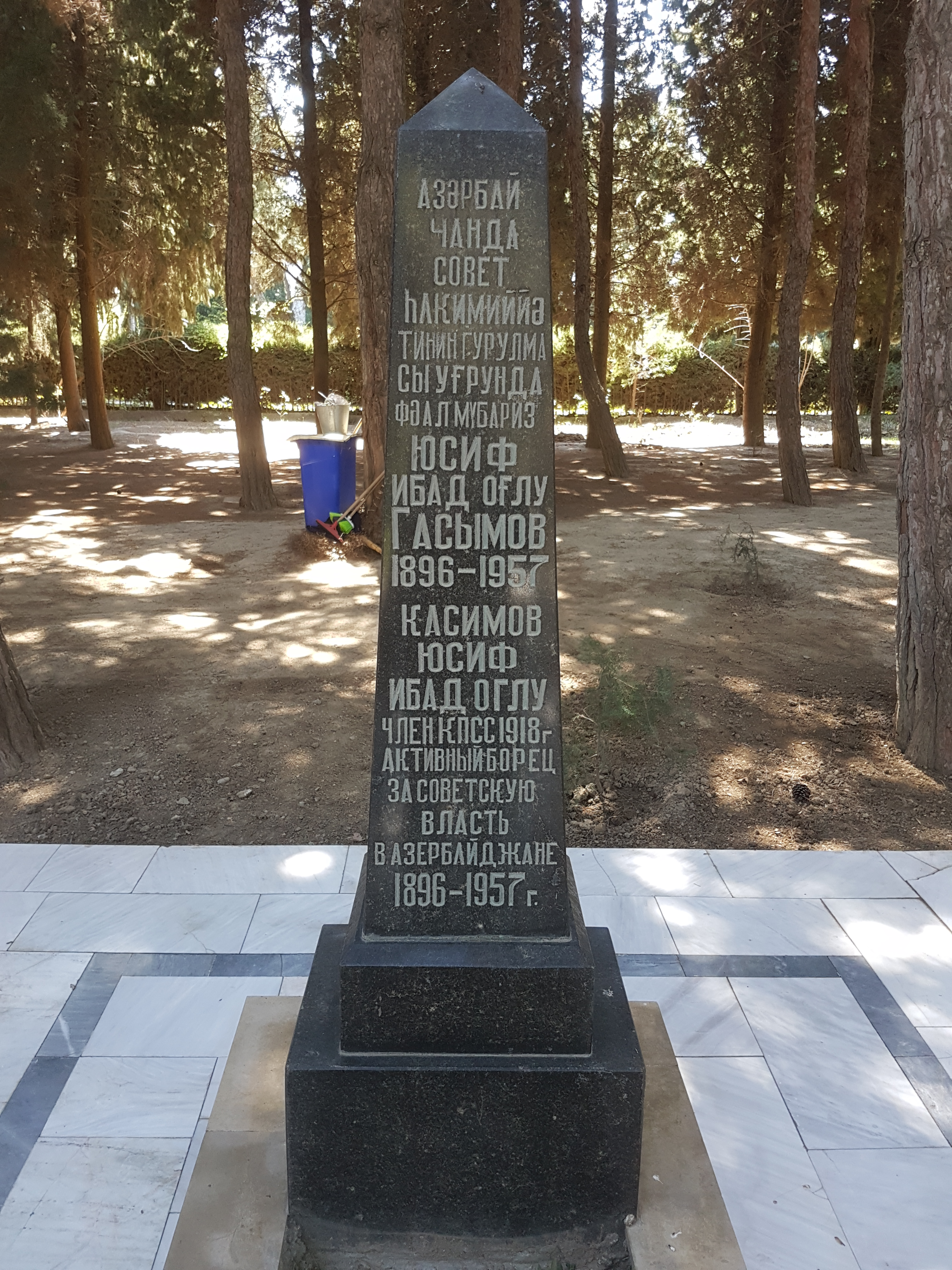
Tomb of Yusif Gasimov in the Alley of Honors

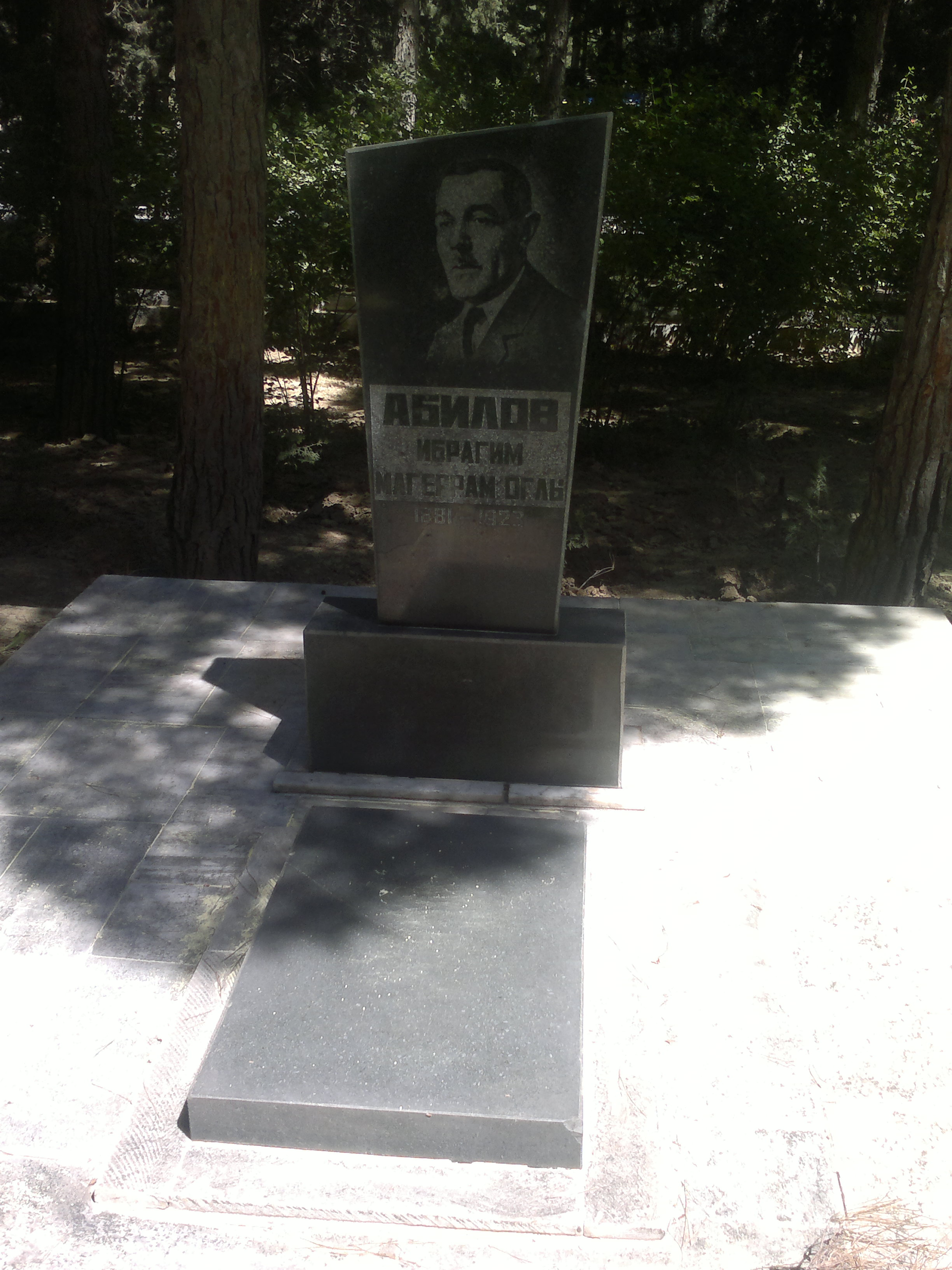
Tomb of Ibrahim Abilov in the Alley of Honors

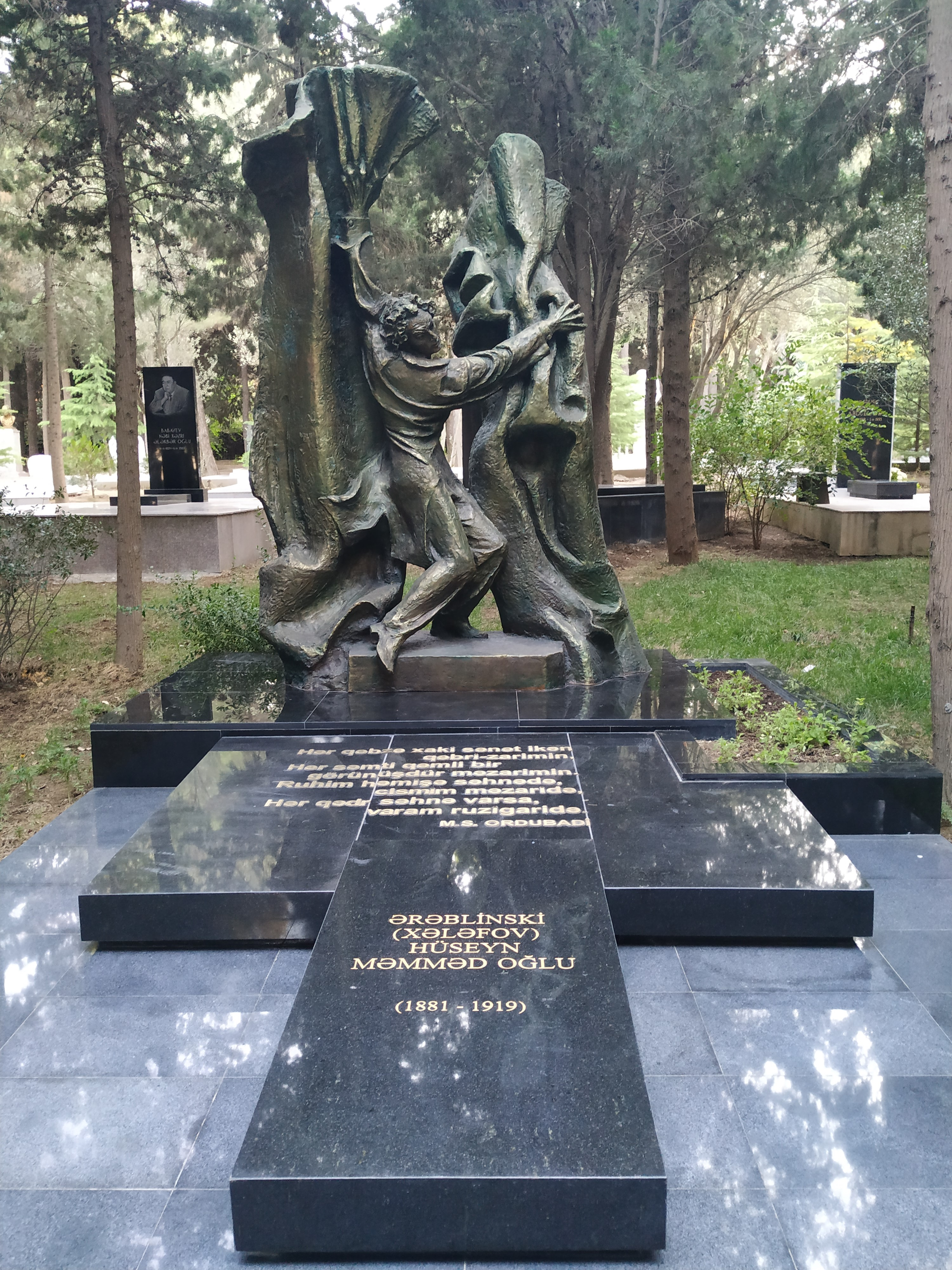
Tomb of Huseyn Arablinski in the Alley of Honors

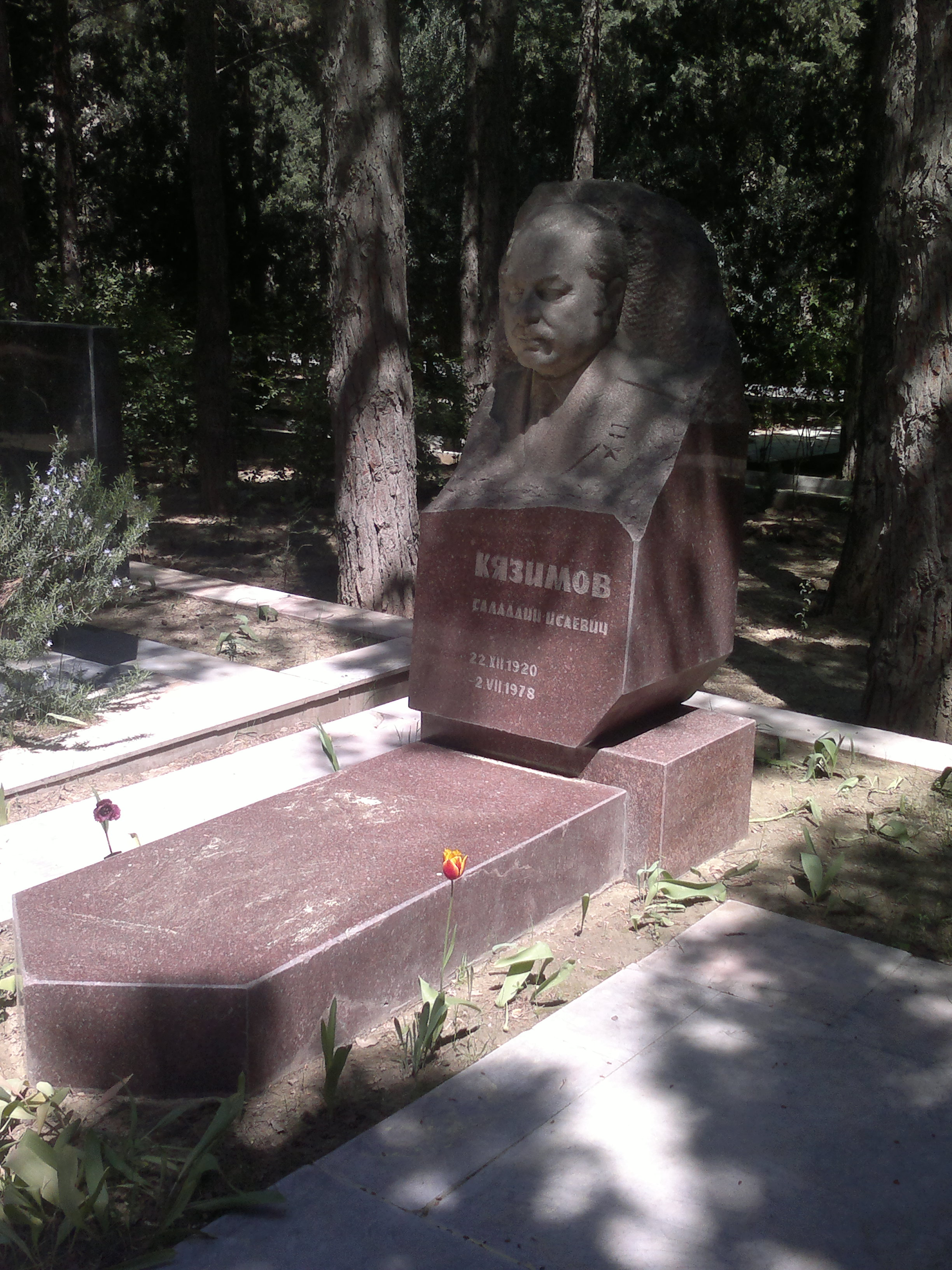
Tomb of Salahaddin Kazimov in the Alley of Honors

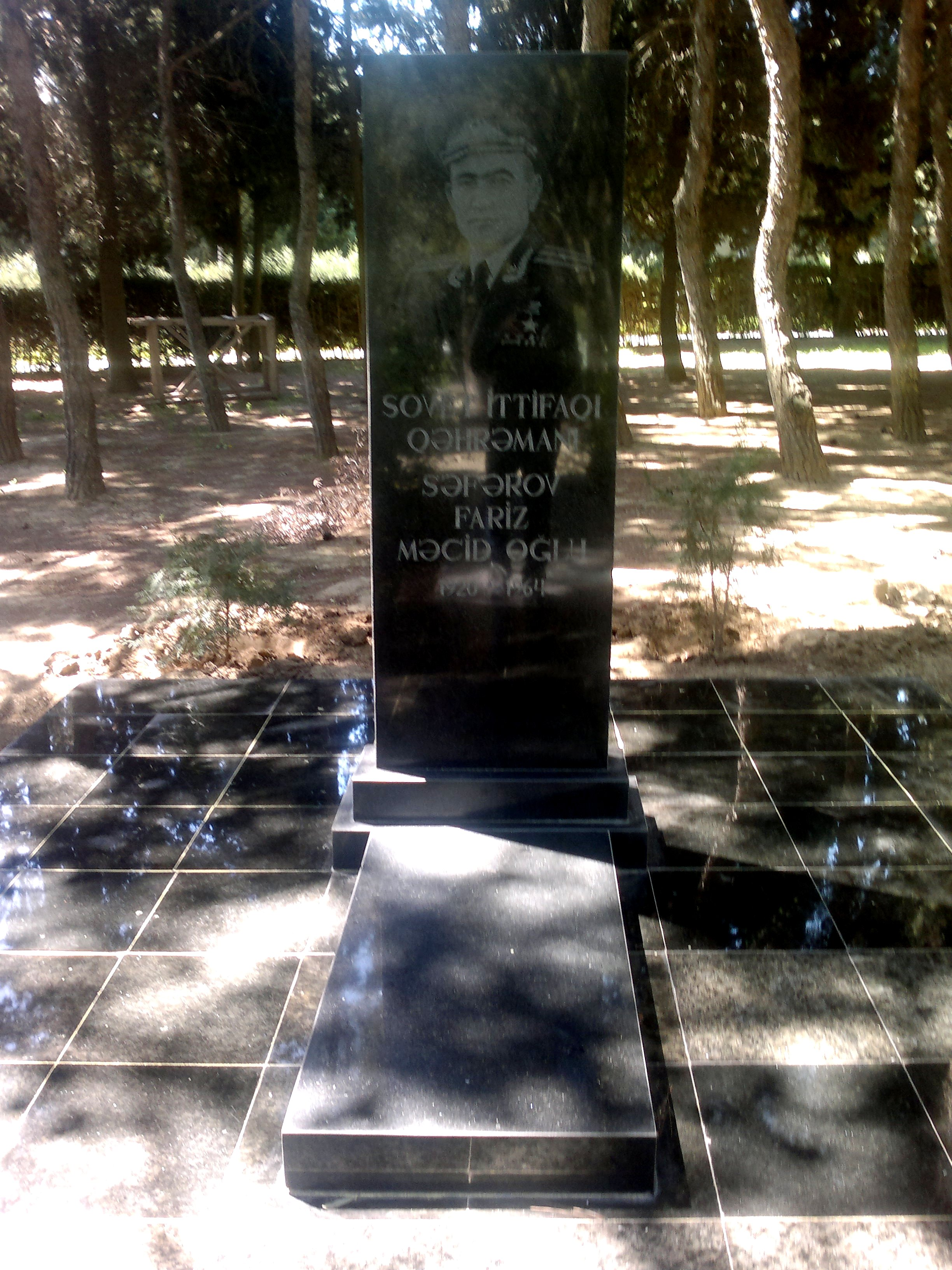
Tomb of Fariz Safarov in the Alley of Honors

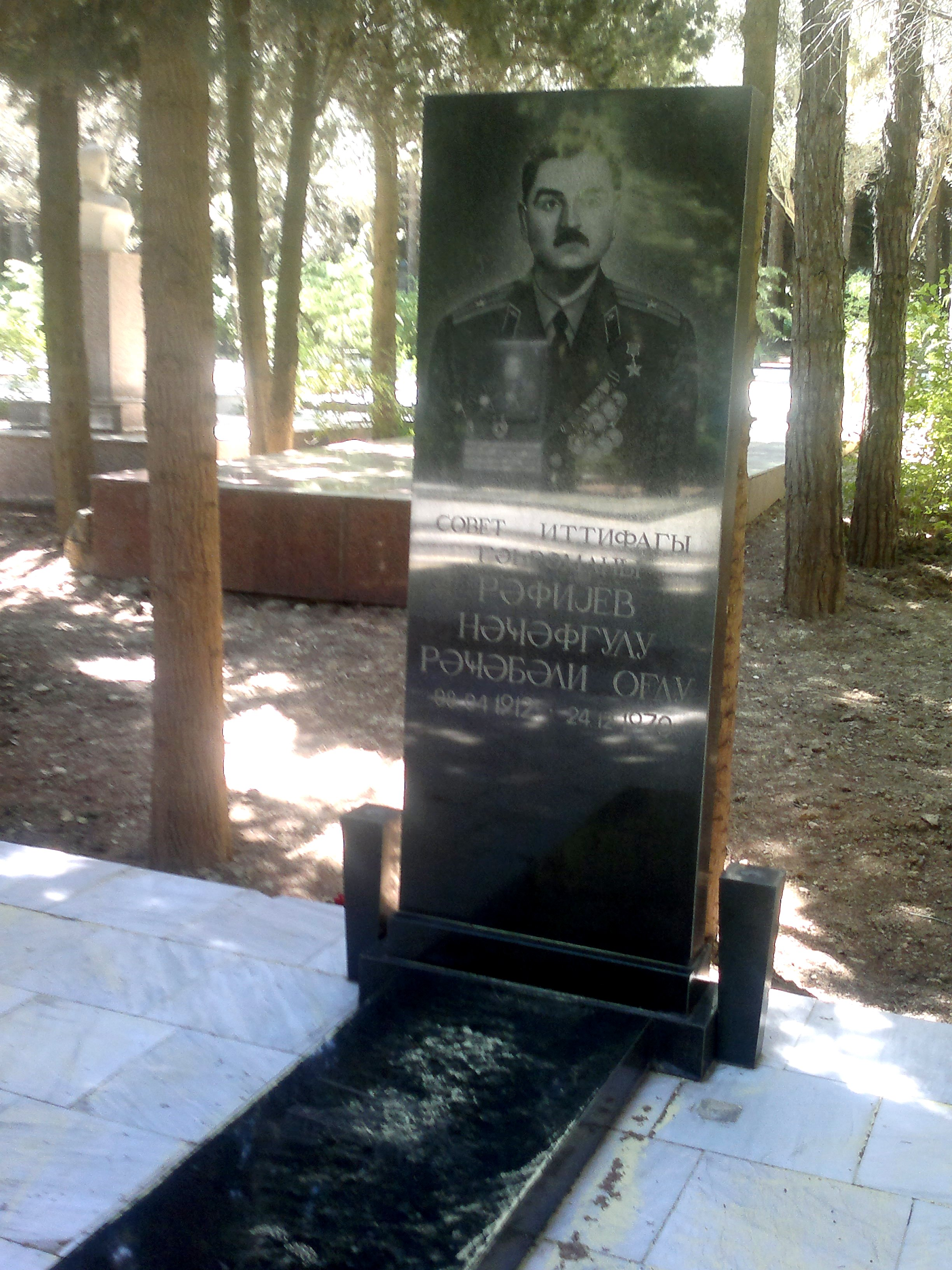
Tomb of Najafgulu Rafiyev in the Alley of Honors

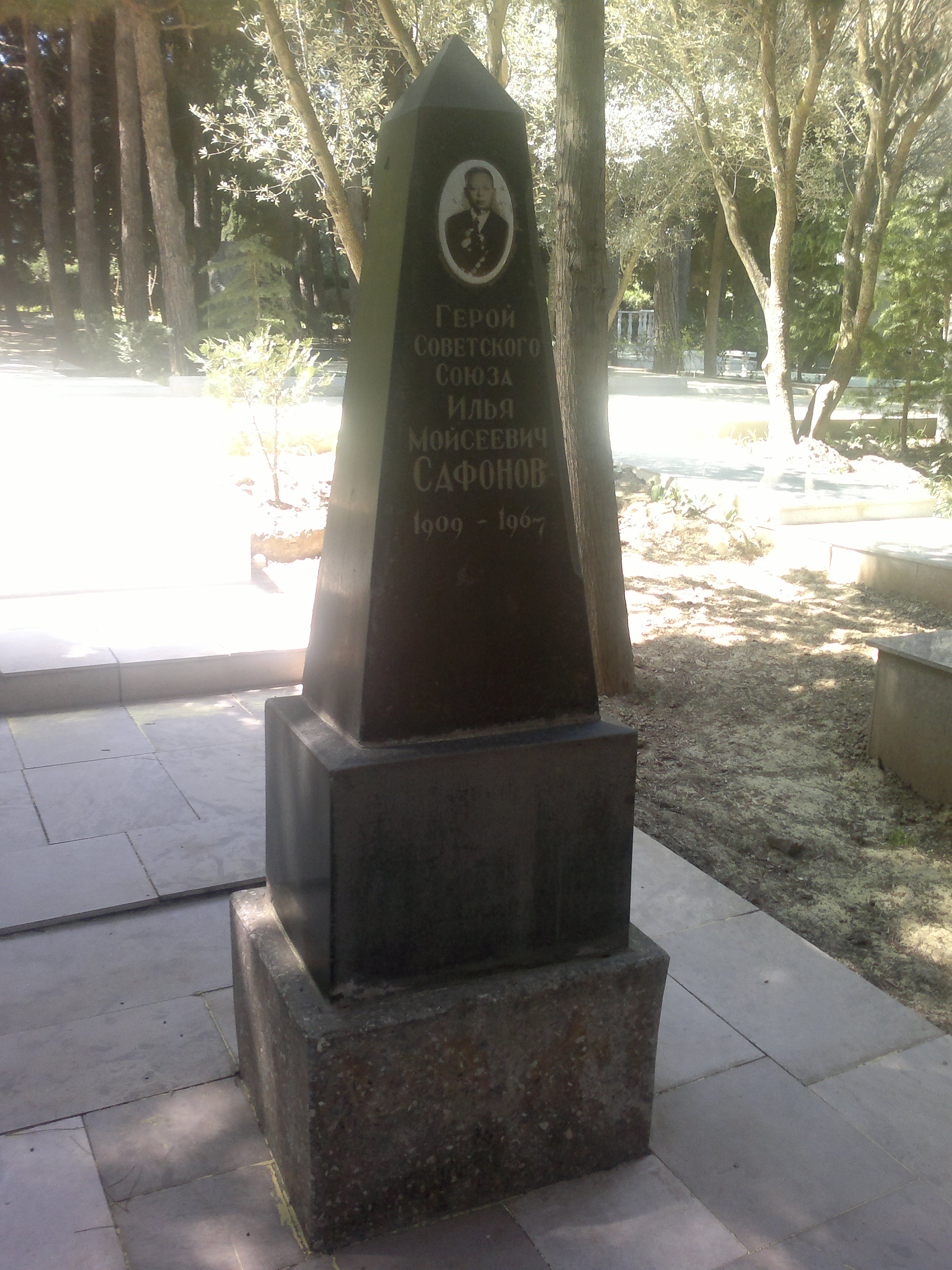
Tomb of Ilya Safonov in the Alley of Honors

== See also ==
- Martyrs' Lane
- Chemberekend Cemetery
- II Alley of Honor
