= Tahira Tahirova =

Soviet politician and diplomat

- Tahirə Tahirova

Minister of Foreign Affairs of Azerbaijan SSR
- In office 1959–1983
- President: Vali Akhundov, Heydar Aliyev, Kamran Baghirov (First Secretaries of Azerbaijan Communist Party)
- Preceded by: Mahmud Aliyev
- Succeeded by: Elmira Qafarova

Personal details
- Born: 7 November 1913 Baýramaly, Transcaspian Region, Russian Empire
- Died: 26 October 1991 (aged 77) Baku, Azerbaijan

Tahira Akbar qizi Tahirova (Azerbaijani: Tahirə Əkbər qızı Tahirova, Russian: Таи́ра Акпе́ровна Таи́рова; 7 November 1913 – 26 October 1991) was a Soviet politician and diplomat. She served as Foreign Minister of the Azerbaijani Soviet Socialist Republic from 1959 to 1983.

She was the first Azerbaijani woman specialist to receive higher education in the oil industry.

== Early life ==
Tahirova was born on 7 November 1913 in Bayram-Ali (presently in Turkmenistan). Having graduated from the Azerbaijan State Oil Academy (then the Azerbaijan Industry Institute) in 1935, she became the first Azerbaijani female professional obtaining a degree of higher education related to the oil industry. In 1940, she was appointed director of the Azerbaijan Scientific Research Institute. From 1942 on, she worked at the Central Committee of Azerbaijan Communist Party and was in charge of delivering timely oil supplies to Soviet Army fighting the enemy on the frontlines during World War II. In 1949, she started teaching courses on oil-well exploration and development at the Azerbaijan Oil Academy and in 1953 she obtained her PhD.

== Political career ==
Starting from 1954, Tahirova held various high-ranking positions at Azerbaijan Council of Workers Union, Council of Ministers of Azerbaijan SSR. In 1957, she was appointed the Minister of Foreign Affairs of the Azerbaijan SSR. However, her work did not start until 1959 when she graduated from Diplomatic Academy of the Ministry of Foreign Affairs of the USSR. According to Soviet laws of the time, the Minister of Foreign Affairs of a union republic was also in charge of other governmental duties. During her term in office, she succeeded in separation of duties and at her request, was relieved from her additional positions within the government in 1968 and completely committed herself to diplomatic service. Tahirova is known for bringing more Azerbaijani diplomats to foreign service of the Soviet Union and the diplomatic academy of the Ministry of Foreign Affairs. She frequently was a member of Soviet diplomatic teams at the UN General Assembly sessions. In addition to that, as a mediator, Tahirova led the Soviet peacemaking team during the Iran–Iraq War of 1980–1988.

== Awards ==
In 1976, Tahirova was awarded the Order of Friendship of Peoples for her special contribution to foreign office of the USSR as well as with Order of the Red Banner of Labour, Order of Lenin, Order of the Badge of Honour. She was fluent in Turkish, English and Russian.

Tahirova died on 26 October 1991. She was laid to rest at Avenue of the Honored Ones Cemetery.

== Family ==
Tahirova was part of the Tahirovs, one of the noble families of Shusha. She was a relative of the famous Azerbaijani poet Fatma Khanum Kamina and Mirza Hasan Tahirzadeh, the fourth Sheikh ul-Islam of the Caucasus.
