= Tofig Gasimov =

Azerbaijani politician (1938–2020)

- Tofiq Qasımov

Minister of Foreign Affairs of Azerbaijan
- In office 4 July 1992 – 26 June 1993
- President: Abulfaz Elchibey, Heydar Aliyev (acting)
- Preceded by: Huseynaga Sadigov
- Succeeded by: Hasan Hasanov

Personal details
- Born: 10 April 1938 Leki village of Agdash Rayon, Azerbaijan
- Died: 29 January 2020 (aged 81) Lucerne, Switzerland

Tofig Gasimov Masim oglu (Azerbaijani: Tofiq Qasımov Məsim oğlu; 10 April 1938 – 29 January 2020) was an Azerbaijani politician and diplomat. He was Foreign Minister of Azerbajain from 1992 to 1993.

A member of the opposition Musavat Party and an outspoken critic of Azerbajain President Heydar Aliyev, Gasimov was jailed on accusations of providing "ideological support" for the 1995 Azerbaijani coup attempt. Prior to his arrest, Gasimov was set to be one of the leading candidates for the Musavat Party in the 1995 parliamentary elections (the party was eventually banned from contesting the elections). Human Rights Watch described the government's evidence against Gasimov as "shoddy" and Amnesty has raised concerns that the charges were fabricated.

== Early life ==
Gasimov was born in Leki village of Agdash Rayon, Azerbaijan. In 1945–1955, he studied in Agstafa city school. In 1955–1960, he was enrolled at Azerbaijan State University and graduated with a degree in Physics and Mathematics using Stalin scholarship. After graduation, he worked at the Physics Institute of Azerbaijan National Academy of Sciences. Gasimov continued with his post graduate studies at the Physics Institute of USSR Academy of Sciences and in 1969, he obtained his PhD degree. He then worked as a scientist at the National Academy of Sciences in Baku from 1970 on.

== Political career ==
Since 1987, Gasimov has been involved in politics. In March–May 1988, Gasimov participated in drafting the charter of Popular Front of Azerbaijan (PFA) and was one of the board members of the organization from 1989 to 1990. He was elected member of the Investigation Committee of the Azerbaijani Supreme Soviet during the extraordinary session of the parliament on 22 January 1990 to investigate Black January massacre of 20 January 1990. On behalf of PFA, Gasimov had been sent to Moscow to cooperate with deputies of Azerbaijan SSR. Gasimov was credited for his role disseminating the truth about the Black January, refugees to more than 100 TV, radio channels as well as to international media. In May 1992, he was appointed the Minister of Foreign Affairs of Azerbaijan and served until April 1993. Gasimov played an important role in establishing ties with other countries while in office. During his term, Gasimov signed MOU with UN representatives that led to the establishment of Azerbaijan's permanent mission to United Nations.

After being removed from his post, Gasimov tried to get elected to Azerbaijani Parliament as a member of Musavat during the November 1995 parliament elections but was jailed before the elections even took place.

== Post political career ==
Gasimov authored nearly 100 scientific publications. Tofig Gasimov was the co-founder of the Baku Scientists Club. Since the end of the 1990s, he taught in various universities in Turkey and continued his scientific research work.

He was married and had 2 children. Gasimov was fluent in English, Russian and Turkish.
