= Mirza Davud Huseynov =

Azerbaijani revolutionary and Soviet statesman

- Mirzə Davud Hüseynov
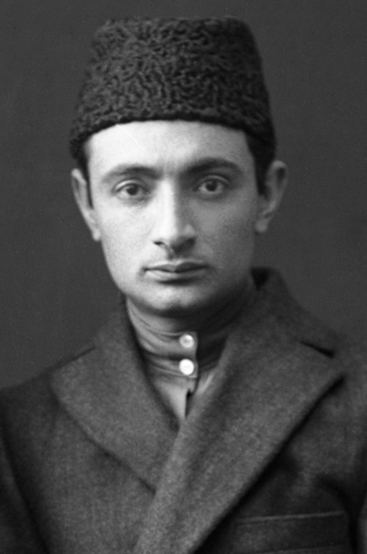
- Huseynov in 1921

Minister of Foreign Affairs of Azerbaijan SSR
- In office May 1921 – December 1921
- President: Grigory Kaminsky (First Secretary of Azerbaijan Communist Party)
- Preceded by: Nariman Narimanov
- Succeeded by: Mahmud Aliyev

People's Commissar of Finance of Azerbaijan SSR
- In office 1925–1925
- Preceded by: Mirzabekyan
- Succeeded by: A. Ibrahimov

Personal details
- Born: March 1894 Baku, Baku Governorate, Caucasus Viceroyalty, Russian Empire
- Died: March 21, 1938 (aged 43–44) Baku, Azerbaijan SSR, Soviet Union
- Party: Russian Communist Party (1918–1937)
- Spouse: Tamara Khoyskaya
- Relations: Fatali Khan Khoyski (father-in-law)

Mirza Davud Baghir oghlu Huseynov (Azerbaijani: میرزا داود باقر اوغلی حسینوف, Мирзә Давуд Бағыр оғлу Һүсејнов, Mirzə Davud Bağır oğlu Hüseynov; Russian: Мирза Давуд Багир оглы Гусейнов), also spelled Husseynov or Huseinov (March 1894 – March 21, 1938), was an Azerbaijani revolutionary and statesman.

== Early life ==
Huseynov was born in a religious family in March 1894 in Baku. Having studied at a local school from 1904 until 1913, he moved to Moscow to study economics at the Institute of Commerce. In May 1917, he returned to Baku and was stationed in Agdash to work in the Refugee Committee of Baku and Ganja governorates. In October, 1918, he went back to Baku and established a student revolutionary committee. In 1920, he married Tamara Khoyskaya (1902—1990), daughter of the Prime Minister of the deposed Azerbaijan Democratic Republic government Fatali Khan Khoyski.

== Political career ==
In March 1919, Huseynov was one of the leaders of the Hummet Party and later was elected its chairman. After the establishment of Azerbaijan SSR, Huseynov became the Chairman of the Provisional Military-Revolutionary Committee from April 28, 1920, to May 16 of the same year. Then he was deputy chairman of the Revolutionary Committee, National Commissar of Finance, and National Commissar of Foreign Affairs of Azerbaijan from May 1921 until December 1921. From 1921, he was simultaneously National Commissar of Finance, National Commissar of Foreign Affairs of Azerbaijan SSR and deputy chairman of the National Commissar Council of Transcaucasian SFSR. In 1922, Huseynov served as the deputy People's Commissariat of Nationalities of RSFSR. From January 1923 until November 1929, he was the deputy chairman People's Commissariat of Transcaucasian Socialist Federative Soviet Republic and served as People's Commissar of Foreign Affairs and People's Commissar of Finance of Azerbaijan SSR in 1925.

From 1930 to November 3, 1933, Mirza Davud was the First Secretary of the Central Committee of the Communist Party of Tajikistan. From 1934 to 1937, he was administrator of the Non-Russian Schooling Department of the National Commissariat for Education of Russian SFSR. During the Great Purge, Mirza Davud was arrested, accused of plotting against the Soviet state, sentenced to death, and executed on March 21, 1938. He was rehabilitated posthumously during de-Stalinization.

== Works ==
Huseynov authored two books during his career: Musavat in the past and present, published in 1920 and Main points of progress of Azerbaijan Communist Party.

== See also ==
- Azerbaijan Communist Party
- Minister of Foreign Affairs of Azerbaijan
- First Secretary of the Communist Party of Tajikistan
