= Mahmud Aliyev =

Soviet politician (1908–1958)

- Mahmud Əliyev
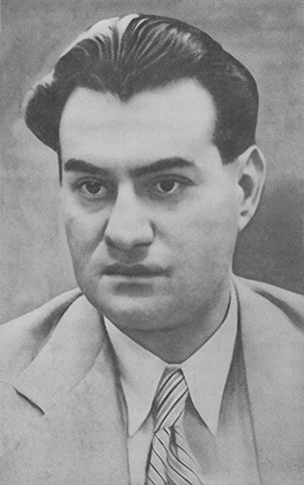

Minister of Foreign Affairs of the Azerbaijan SSR (Note: Before 28 March 1946, the title of the office was People's Commissar for Foreign Affairs.)
- In office 2 September 1944 – 25 September 1958
- Preceded by: Mirza Davud Huseynov (1921)
- Succeeded by: Tahira Tahirova

Deputy People's Commissar for Foreign Affairs of the Soviet Union
- In office 22 November 1943 – 3 September 1944
- Minister: Vyacheslav Molotov

Personal details
- Born: 22 February 1908 Shamakhi, Baku Governorate, Russian Empire
- Died: 25 September 1958 (aged 50) Baku, Azerbaijan SSR, USSR

Mahmud Ismayil oghlu Aliyev (Azerbaijani: Mahmud İsmayıl oğlu Əliyev; 22 February 1908 – 25 September 1958) was an Azerbaijani and Soviet politician and diplomat who served as the Minister of Foreign Affairs of the Azerbaijan SSR from 1944 to 1958.

== Early life ==
Aliyev was born on 22 February 1908, in Shamakhi, Azerbaijan. In 1926, he completed his secondary education in Baku, and in 1931 he graduated from Azerbaijan State Medical University with a degree in General Therapy. In 1931–1936, he was director of a clinic in Kalbajar and Jabrayil rayons of Azerbaijan and head surgeon of a regional hospital. In 1938 he was admitted to the ranks of the Communist Party of the Soviet Union.

== Political career ==
Starting from 1937 through 1943, Aliyev headed the Department of Medical Education of Commissariat of People's Health, was director of Azerbaijan State Medical University, and director of the Science and Preschool Department of Central Committee of Azerbaijan Communist Party. In 1943, Mahmud Aliyev was the Deputy Commissar of Foreign Affairs of Soviet Union and in 1944, he was appointed the Minister of Foreign Affairs of Azerbaijan SSR. While in the office of foreign service, he also worked as the Rector of Doctors' Qualification Institute of Azerbaijan SSR in 1950–1953. Aliyev also served as deputy in the Supreme Soviet of the Soviet Union and Supreme Soviet of Azerbaijan SSR.

== Awards ==
In 1943, Aliyev was awarded the title of Merited Doctor of Azerbaijan SSR. He has also been awarded with Order of the Red Banner of Labour and other medals.

Aliyev died on 25 September 1958. He was laid to rest at the Alley of Honor.
