= Elmar Mammadyarov =

Azerbaijani diplomat

- Elmar Məmmədyarov
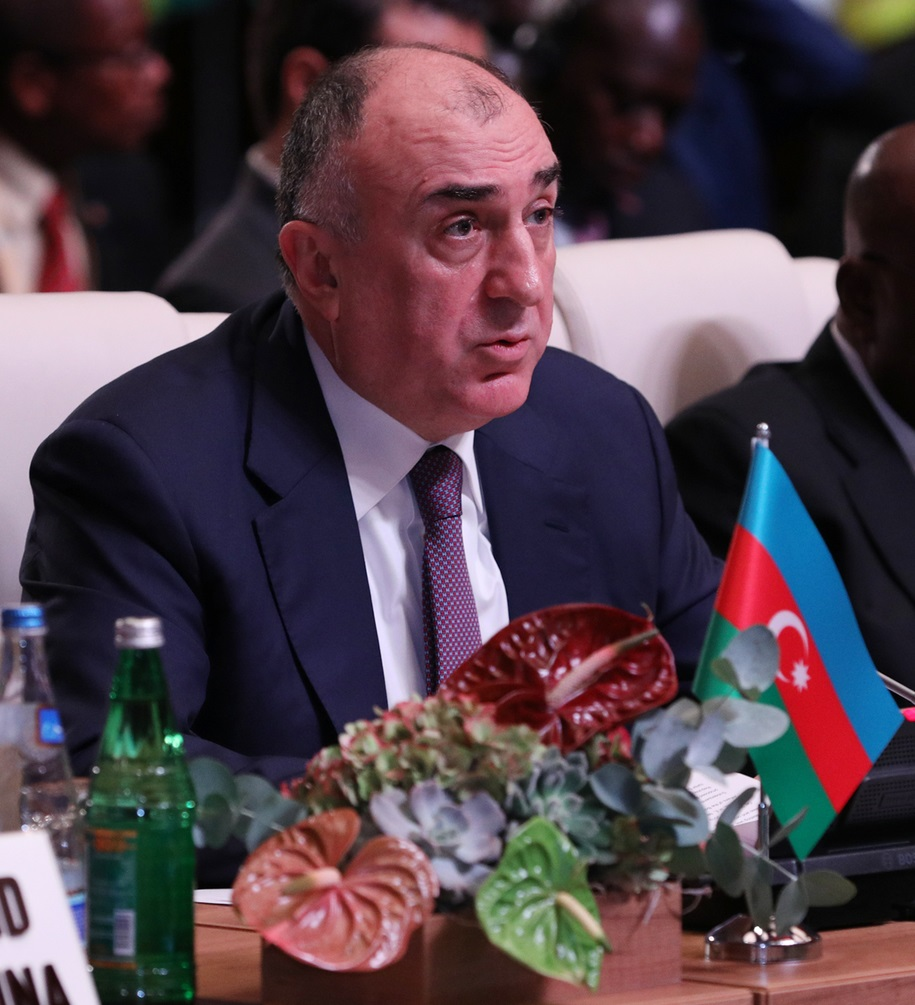
- Mammadyarov in 2019

Minister of Foreign Affairs
- In office 2 April 2004 – 16 July 2020
- President: Ilham Aliyev
- Prime Minister: Artur Rasizade; Novruz Mammadov; Ali Asadov
- Preceded by: Vilayat Guliyev
- Succeeded by: Jeyhun Bayramov

President of the Committee of Ministers of the Council of Europe
- In office 6 May 2014 – 13 November 2015
- Preceded by: Sebastian Kurz
- Succeeded by: Didier Reynders

Ambassador of Azerbaijan to Italy
- In office 2 July 2003 – 2 April 2004
- Preceded by: Rufat Aghayev
- Succeeded by: Emil Karimov

Personal details
- Born: 2 July 1960 (age 66) Baku, Azerbaijan SSR, Soviet Union (now Azerbaijan)
- Party: Independent
- Parent: Maharram Mammadyarov (father)
- Education: National University of Kyiv; Russian Diplomatic Academy of the Ministry of Foreign Affairs

Elmar Maharram oglu Mammadyarov (Azerbaijani: Elmar Məhərrəm oğlu Məmmədyarov, IPA: [elˈmɑɾ mæhæˈɾæm oɣˈlu mæmædˈjɑɾov]; born 2 July 1960) is an Azerbaijani diplomat who served as Minister of Foreign Affairs of Azerbaijan between 7 April 2004 and 16 July 2020.

== Early life ==
Mammadyarov was born in Baku, then part of the Azerbaijan SSR, on 2 July 1960. His father, Maharram Mammadyarov, was born in Nakhchivan Autonomous Republic. He studied at the School of International Relations and International Law of the Kyiv State University in 1977-1982. He continued his education at the Diplomatic Academy of the MFA of USSR in 1988-1991 and obtained a PhD in History. In 1989-1990, Mammadyarov was appointed as exchange scholar at the Center for Foreign Policy Development of the Brown University.

== Political career ==
Mammadyarov started his diplomatic career in the Ministry of Foreign Affairs of the Azerbaijani SSR in 1982. He served there as second and first secretary until 1988. During 1991 and 1992, he was the Director of the State Protocol Division. From 1992 to 1995, Mammadyarov worked in the Permanent Mission of Azerbaijan to the United Nations in New York. Upon completion of his duties he returned to Baku and from 1995 to 1998 he was the deputy director of the Department of International Organizations in the Ministry. From 1998 to 2003, he served as counselor at the Embassy of Azerbaijan to the United States. In 2003, Mammadyarov was appointed as Ambassador to Italy.

=== As foreign minister ===
On 2 April 2004, he was appointed as the Minister of Foreign Affairs. During his tenure as foreign minister, Mammadyarov was involved in multiple political activities. Under his position, Azerbaijan took over Chairmanship of the Council of Europe’s Committee of Ministers from Austria for six months in 2014. On June 23, he presented communication to PACE. In his overview, he stressed on combating corruption and manipulation of sports competitions. Elmar Mammadyarov is also chairperson of the National Commission of the Republic of Azerbaijan for UNESCO.

=== Dismissal ===
He was dismissed in July 2020 after President Aliyev criticized his absence in office during that month's Armenian–Azerbaijani skirmishes. On 16 July, Aliyev conducted an online meeting of the Cabinet of Ministers, where he criticized the Foreign Ministry for being unable to find Mammadyarov in the early stages of the crisis. Stating that while "the Prime Minister is at work, I am at work until the morning, the Minister of Defense, the Chief of General Staff, as well as the Chief of the State Security Service, the Minister of Internal Affairs, the Chief of the Foreign Intelligence Service, and the Secretary of the Security Council are at work until the early hours of the morning", Aliyev asked about the Foreign Minister's whereabouts, to which Prime Minister Ali Asadov replied that Mammadyarov was "working from home". Mammadyarov was dismissed from his position a few hours later. Jeyhun Bayramov was appointed as his successor.

== Personal life ==
His mother, Izida Ibrahimbeyova, is the daughter of Fuad Ibrahimbeyov. His father, Maharram Mammadyarov, is a doctor of chemical sciences, a full member of the Azerbaijan National Academy of Sciences. Elmar Mammadyarov is married to Kamilla Mammadyarov, they have children named Emin and Riad. Mammadyarov speaks Russian, English, Azerbaijani, and Turkish.

== Awards ==
- For service to the Fatherland Order, first degree (9 July 2019)
- Order of Merit, 1st class (Ukraine, 19 August 2006)
- Commander of the Order of Merit of the Republic of Poland (Poland, 2009)
- Commander's Cross of the Order of Merit (Hungary, 2018)
- Order of the Grand Commander (Columbia, 2012)
- Medal “25 years of independence of the Republic of Kazakhstan” (Kazakhstan, 2017)

== See also ==
- List of foreign ministers in 2017

Political offices
Preceded by Vilayat Guliyev	Minister of Foreign Affairs; 2004–2020	Succeeded by Jeyhun Bayramov
