= Jeyhun Bayramov =

Minister of Foreign Affairs of the Republic of Azerbaijan since 2020

- Ceyhun Bayramov
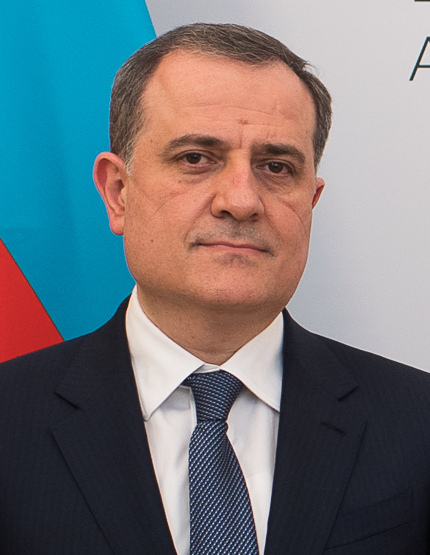
- Bayramov in 2021

Minister of Foreign Affairs
- Incumbent
- Assumed office 16 July 2020
- President: Ilham Aliyev
- Prime Minister: Ali Asadov
- Preceded by: Elmar Mammadyarov

Minister of Education
- In office 23 April 2018 – 16 July 2020 (Acting: December 8, 2017 – 23 April 2018)
- Prime Minister: Novruz Mammadov; Ali Asadov
- Preceded by: Mikayil Jabbarov
- Succeeded by: Emin Amrullayev

Deputy Minister of Education
- In office 12 August 2013 – 23 April 2018

Personal details
- Born: 25 June 1973 (age 53) Baku, Azerbaijan SSR, Soviet Union (now Azerbaijan)
- Education: Azerbaijan State University of Economics; Azerbaijan University

Jeyhun Aziz oglu Bayramov (Azerbaijani: Ceyhun Əziz oğlu Bayramov; born 25 June 1973) is an Azerbaijani politician who is the current Minister of Foreign Affairs of the Republic of Azerbaijan. Bayramov previously served as the Minister of Education from 2018 to 2020.

== Early life and career ==
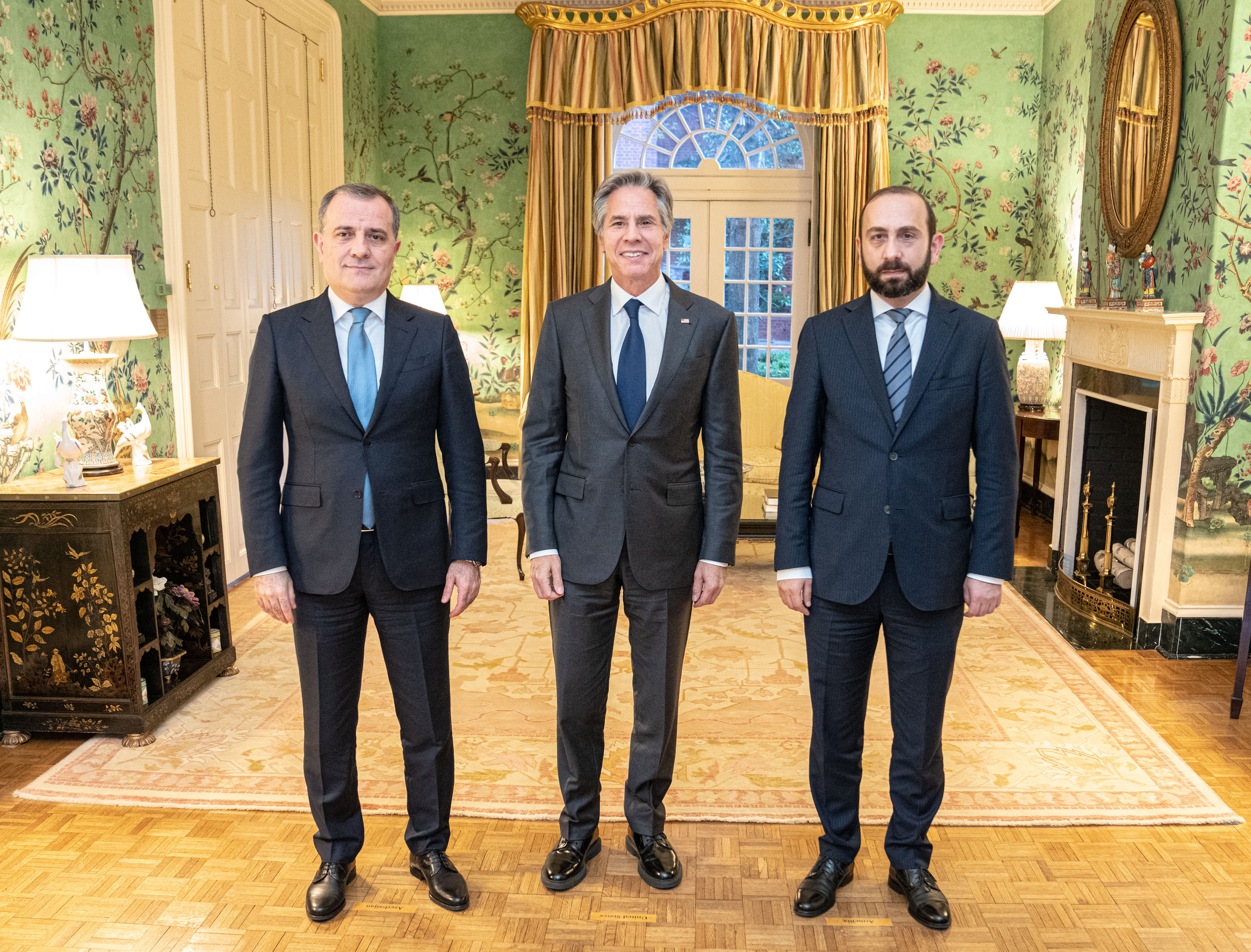
Bayramov with U.S. Secretary of State Antony Blinken and Armenian Foreign Minister Ararat Mirzoyan in Washington, D.C., 7 November 2022

Bayramov earned a law degree from Azerbaijan University and holds a degree in economics from the Azerbaijan State University of Economics. He worked at various positions at the Ministry of Taxes between 1996 and 2000. He continued his career as a lawyer in "Salans Hertzfeld & Heilbronn (Baku) Limited" in 2000-2002. He was the Director of the "OMNI" law firm until 2013. He has regularly appeared on the "Chambers Global", "IFLR1000" and "Legal500" list of leading tax and civil rights lawyers in Azerbaijan.

Bayramov returned to the civil service as the Chief of Staff of the Ministry of Education on 30 May 2013 and served until 12 August 2013. He was appointed the Deputy Minister of Education by the decree of President Ilham Aliyev on 12 August 2013. He was promoted and appointed as the Minister of Education by order of President Aliyev on 23 April 2018. On 16 July 2020, Bayramov was appointed as the Minister of Foreign Affairs. He is a co-founder of "OMNI" law firm.

In 2025 he was awarded the Order of the Serbian Flag.

== See also ==
- List of current foreign ministers

Political offices
Preceded by Elmar Mammadyarov	Minister of Foreign Affairs; 2020–present	Incumbent
