= Vilayat Guliyev =

Azerbaijani politician (born 1952)

- Vilayət Quliyev
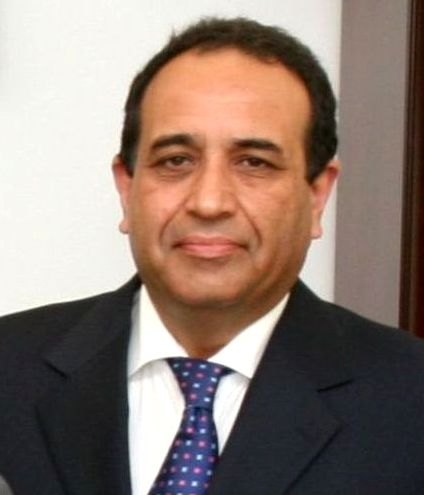
- Guliyev in 2007

Ambassador of Azerbaijan to Bosnia and Herzegovina
- Incumbent
- Assumed office 4 May 2022
- Preceded by: Eldar Hasanov

Ambassador of Azerbaijan to Hungary
- In office 30 March 2010 – 23 July 2021
- Preceded by: Hasan Hasanov
- Succeeded by: Tahir Taghizade

Ambassador of Azerbaijan to Poland
- In office 7 June 2004 – 30 March 2010
- Succeeded by: Hasan Hasanov

Minister of Foreign Affairs
- In office 26 October 1999 – 2 April 2004
- President: Heydar Aliyev; Ilham Aliyev
- Preceded by: Tofig Zulfugarov
- Succeeded by: Elmar Mammadyarov

Personal details
- Born: 5 November 1952 (age 73) Agjabadi, Azerbaijan SSR, USSR

Vilayat Mukhtar oglu Guliyev (Azerbaijani: Vilayət Muxtar oğlu Quliyev / Вилајәт Мухтар оғлу Гулијев, pronounced [vilɑˈjæt muxˈtɑɾ oɣˈlu ɡuˈlijef]; born 5 November 1952) is an Azerbaijani politician who was Minister of Foreign Affairs of Azerbaijan from 1999 to 2004. He was elected to the Azeri parliament in 1996 as a supporter of President Heydar Aliyev. He served as Minister of Foreign Affairs under Aliyev, and for short term under his son, Ilham, from October 1999 until April 2004, when he was replaced by Elmar Mammadyarov.

== Early life ==
Guliyev was born on November 5, 1952, in a town of Agjabedi, Azerbaijan. Having completed high school, he enrolled at Azerbaijan State University in 1970 and graduated with a degree in Philology in 1975. He then worked as a teacher at a local school in Beylagan Rayon of Azerbaijan. At the same time, he was admitted to Azerbaijan National Academy of Sciences for doctoral studies. In 1978-1981, Guliyev worked as the head of department and later as deputy director of the academy's Institute of Literature and Languages named after Nizami. From 1992 through 1993, he was a professor at Atatürk University in Turkey and in 1994 was appointed Chief Scientist at the National Academy of Sciences.

== Political career ==
In 1996, Guliyev was elected to the National Assembly of Azerbaijan (Milli Mejlis). In October 1999, he was appointed as Minister of Foreign Affairs by President Heydar Aliyev. In 2004, Guliyev was appointed Ambassador of Azerbaijan to Poland. He has since played a significant role in facilitating military cooperation of signing of military-technical memorandum with Poland and sparking interest of Polish government in transportation of Azerbaijani oil and gas to Poland and Ukraine through Odesa-Brody-Gdansk pipeline. In 2010, Guliyev was appointed Ambassador of Azerbaijan to Hungary.

== Academic titles and works ==
In 1990, Guliyev obtained PhD in Philology. He authored 3 monographs and over 300 publications. Guliyev also wrote over 12 books. Main subject of his research was analysis of literature and history of its application in relations between Azerbaijan, Russia, Iran and Turkey in 19th-20th centuries. Vilayat Guliyev is fluent in Russian, Turkish, Arabic, English and Persian.

Guliyev is married and has two children. One of his children, Shamil Guluzade currently works at Baku International Sea Trade Port.

== See also ==
- Elmar Mammadyarov
- Ministers of Foreign Affairs of Azerbaijan Republic
