= Vafa Guluzade =

Azerbaijani diplomat (1940–2015)

Vafa Guluzade Vəfa Quluzadə
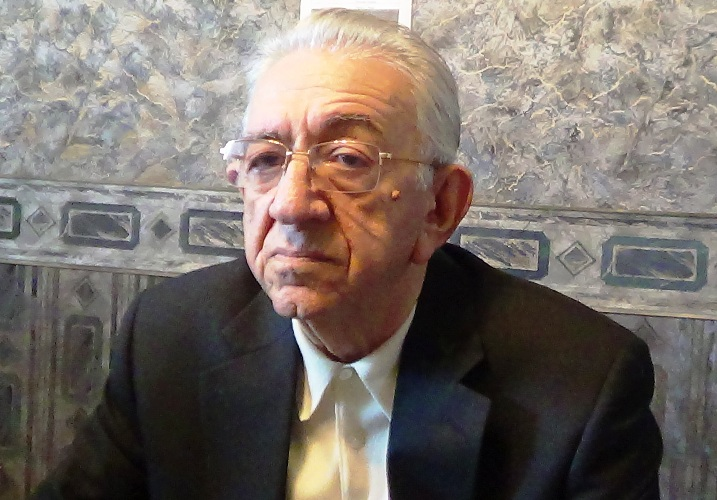

Foreign Policy State Advisor for Azerbaijan President (1990-1999)

Personal details
- Born: 21 December 1940 Baku, Azerbaijan SSR, USSR
- Died: 1 May 2015 (aged 74) Baku, Azerbaijan Republic
- Spouse: Leyla Ahmadova

Vafa Guluzade (surname also spelled as Gulizade(h), Goulizade(h), Kulizade(h), Quluzade(h)) (Azerbaijani: 'Vəfa Mirzağa oğlu Quluzadə') (21 December 1940 – 1 May 2015) was an Azerbaijani diplomat, political scientist and specialist in conflict resolution. He worked as Foreign Policy State Advisor for the President of Azerbaijan between 1990 and 1999.

== Education and political career ==
Vafa Guluzade was born on 21 December 1940 in Baku, Azerbaijan SSR, USSR. Guluzade graduated from high school in 1958 and from the Azerbaijan State University in 1963. Later he worked for Azerbaijani radio as an editor at the foreign desk. He was accepted to the Institute of Middle Eastern Studies of the USSR Academy of Sciences in Moscow and studied there for three years. He did his graduate work on modern Egyptian literature and received an M.A. degree in 1968.

Guluzade began his diplomatic career in 1969 as an attache at the Ministry of Foreign Affairs of the USSR and later was promoted to the second secretary of the Soviet Embassy in Egypt. After service in Cairo, he was transferred to the Middle Eastern Department of the Ministry of Foreign Affairs in Moscow. Speaking fluent Russian and Arabic, he interpreted for Anwar Sadat, President of Egypt, Hafez al-Assad, President of Syria, also for Leonid Brezhnev, Alexei Kosygin, Andrei Gromyko, Andrei Grechko and other senior officials.

After the Arab-Israeli war, Guluzade took part in negotiations within the framework of the Geneva Conference in 1973–1974 and participated in many international conferences on Palestinian problem, including the Geneva Conference in 1984, and Istanbul conference in 1986.

His personal acquaintance with Azerbaijani President Heydar Aliyev goes back to 1973, when Aliyev headed a Soviet delegation to Egypt. At the end of 1975, Heydar Aliyev, then First Secretary of the Azerbaijan Communist Party, invited him to Baku and appointed him as the head of the Department of Culture in the Central Committee of the Azerbaijan Communist Party. During his tenure in Baku during the 1980s, Guluzade graduated by correspondence from the Moscow Academy of Social Sciences. In 1987, he was again invited to the Ministry of Foreign Affairs of the USSR and was summoned as a counselor to the Soviet Embassy in Algeria.

From November 1990 until October 1999, Guluzade served as an Advisor and Counselor on Foreign Policy Matters to three consecutive Presidential Administrations of Ayaz Mutallibov, Abulfaz Elchibey and Heydar Aliyev. During that period, Guluzade was a constant member of the State Security Council. He was the Chief Negotiator and representative of President Aliyev on negotiations with Armenia on Nagorno-Karabakh issue. He also participated as a member of the Azerbaijani delegation in the Helsinki Summit of the CSCE in 1992, the 49th Session of the General Assembly of the United Nations in 1994, the Budapest Summit of the CSCE in 1994, Casablanca Summit of the Organisation of Islamic Conference in 1994, World Economic Forum held in Davos in 1995, World Summit for Social Development held in Copenhagen in 1995, Organization for Security and Co-operation in Europe (OSCE) Lisbon Summit in 1996, the European Commission Summit held in 1997 in Strasbourg, NATO's summits held in 1997 in Madrid and in 1999 in Washington, D.C., Monaco World Summit. He headed numerous delegations from Azerbaijan participating at the OSCE Minsk Group meetings held in Rome, Paris, Vienna, Prague, Geneva, Brussels, Ankara and Moscow.

He was a recognized expert on the issues of the Commonwealth of Independent States, and in particular, Russia and the Caucasus. He published numerous articles in newspapers analyzing the policy of Russia in the Caucasus. Guluzade was known as an advocate of a pro-Western orientation for Azerbaijan, and was characterized by the US Department of State as "the architect of pro-Western orientation of Azerbaijan." In 1999, he was the first local expert to articulate the idea of placing NATO military bases in the Caucasus. This caused uproar in a number of well-known newspapers and publications, and triggered sharp reactions in Russia and Iran.

In October 1999 due to disagreements on key foreign policy issues with the then leadership, he resigned from the position of the Foreign Policy Advisor for the President of Azerbaijan and established the Caspian Policy Studies Foundation.

In 2000, Guluzade was invited by the US Government to lecture at leading US universities and think tanks, such as Harvard University, Columbia University, Johns Hopkins University, American University, Carnegie Foundation, and the Center for Strategic and International Studies. He was received at the White House, U.S. Department of State, and other governmental organizations. He is the author of two books dedicated to the issues of Russia, Caucasus and Turkey, and conflicts on these territories.

Guluzade was fluent in Azerbaijani, Russian, Arabic, and English.

== Bibliography ==
- «Кавказ среди врагов и друзей (статьи, интервью, выступления)». Баку, 2002 г., 231 с. ISBN 2-00-227624-2.

== Personal life and death ==
Guluzade was married, had daughter and son (1974–2010); and four grandchildren.

He died on May 1, 2015, in Baku, Azerbaijan.
