= Minister of Foreign Affairs (Azerbaijan) =

This is a list of ministers of foreign affairs of Azerbaijan, from the Democratic Republic of Azerbaijan to the Republic of Azerbaijan.

== List of foreign ministers ==
=== Democratic Republic of Azerbaijan ===
- Mammedhasan Hajinski (May 28, 1918–October 6, 1918)
- Alimardan Topchubashev (October 6, 1918–December 7, 1918)
- Fatali Khan Khoyski (December 26, 1918–March 14, 1919)
- Mammad Yusif Jafarov (March 14, 1919–December 22, 1919)
- Fatali Khan Khoyski, second term (December 24, 1919–April 1, 1920)

=== Azerbaijan Soviet Socialist Republic ===
- Nariman Narimanov (April 1920–May 2, 1921)
- Mirza Davud Huseynov (May 1921 – December, 1921)
- No ministers of foreign affairs between 1921 and 1944
- Mahmud Aliyev (1944–1958)
- Tahira Tahirova (1959–1983)
- Elmira Qafarova (December 1, 1983 – December 22, 1987)
- Huseynaga Sadigov (January 23, 1988–October 18, 1991)

=== Azerbaijan Republic ===
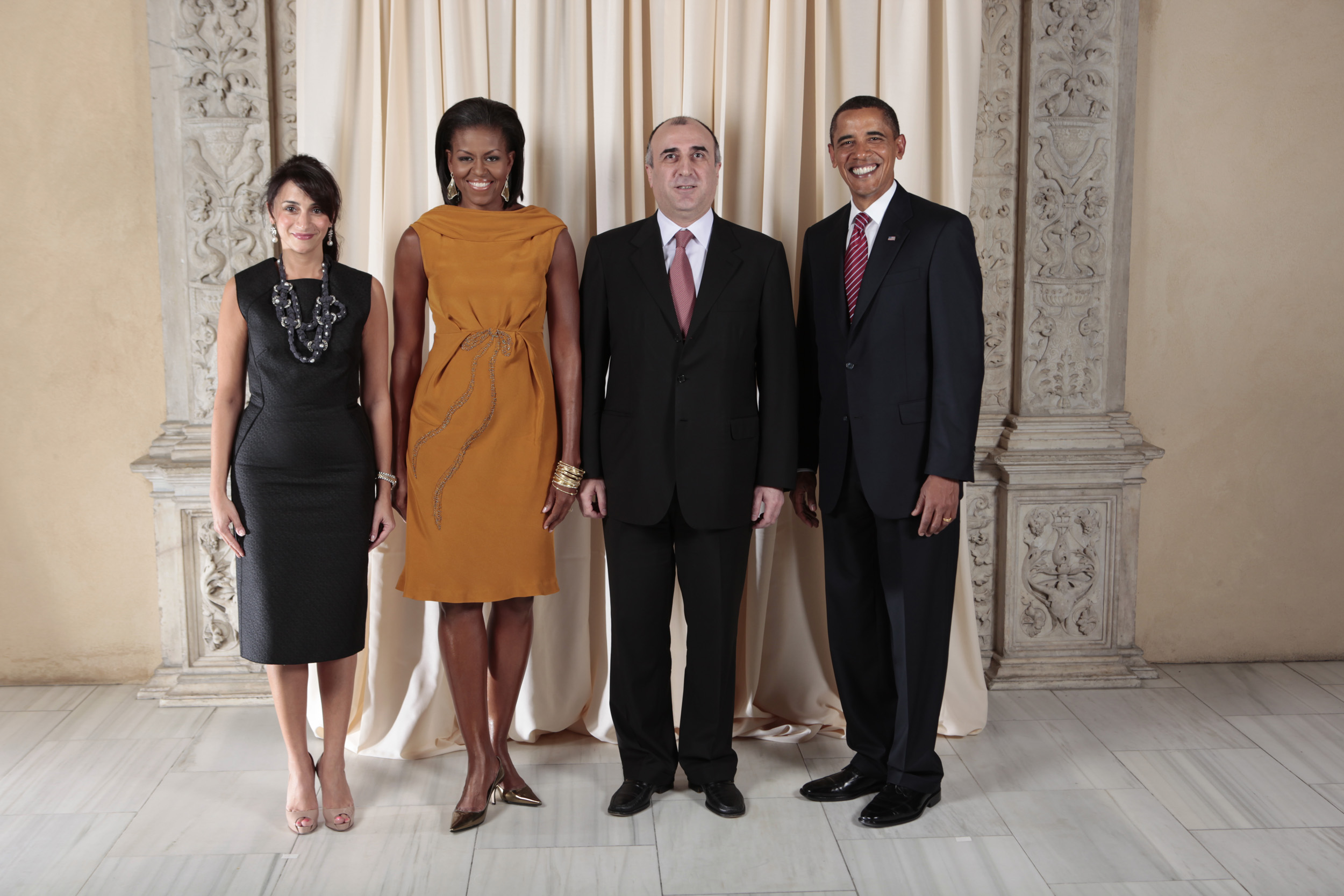
Minister of Foreign Affairs Elmar Mammadyarov and his spouse with President Barack Obama and First Lady Michelle Obama

- Huseynaga Sadigov (January 23, 1988–May 29, 1992)
- Tofig Gasimov (July 4, 1992–June 26, 1993)
- Hasan Hasanov (September 2, 1993 – February 16, 1998)
- Tofig Zulfugarov (March 5, 1998–October 26, 1999)
- Vilayat Guliyev (October 26, 1999–April 7, 2004)
- Elmar Mammadyarov (April 7, 2004–July 16, 2020)
- Jeyhun Bayramov (July 16, 2020 –)

== See also ==
- Ministry of Foreign Affairs of Azerbaijan
