= List of playwrights by nationality and year of birth =

Dramatists listed in chronological order by country and language:

See also: List of playwrights; List of early-modern British women playwrights; Lists of writers

== Albania ==
See also: List of Albanian writers

- (1850–1904) Sami Frashëri

== Assyria ==
See also: List of Assyrian writers

- (born 1965) Rosie Malek-Yonan
- (born 1969) Monica Malek-Yonan

== Australia ==
- (1799–1873) Henry Melville
- (1813–1868) Charles Harpur
- (1822–1878) William Akhurst
- (1842–1880) Walter Cooper
- (1843–1913) Garnet Walch
- (1843–1908) Alfred Dampier
- (1846–1881) Marcus Clarke
- (1846–1918) Mary Foott
- (1860–1921) Charles Haddon Spurgeon Chambers
- (1862–1938) Edmund Duggan
- (1865–1944) Alex Melrose
- (1867–1905) Guy Boothby
- (1869–1942) George Beeby
- (1873–1953) Dora Wilcox
- (1877–1946) Harry Tighe
- (1878–1943) Louis Esson
- (1865–1935) Carlton Dawe
- (1881–1917) Sumner Locke
- (1884–1946) Walter J. Turner
- (1888–1954) Lionel Shave
- (1894–1918) Adrian Consett Stephen
- (1906–1954) Malcolm Afford
- (1912–1988) Kylie Tennant
- (1916–1999) Morris West
- (1917–2000) Jack Davis
- (1921–2024) Ray Lawler
- (1923–2002) Dorothy Hewett
- (1927–2015) Alan Seymour
- (born 1933) Wendy Richardson
- (born 1941) Kenneth G. Ross
- (born 1942) David Williamson
- (1944–2006) Alex Buzo
- (1948–1997) Roger Bennett
- (1948–2017) Jimmy Chi
- (1950–2003) Nick Enright
- (born 1950) Louis Nowra
- (born 1953) Justin Fleming
- (born 1955) Michael Gow
- (born 1959) Richard Frankland
- (born 1960) Jane Harrison
- (1964–1989) Bill Neskovski
- (born 1969) Wesley Enoch
- (born 1978) Van Badham
- (born 1978) Lally Katz
- (born 1978) Tom Taylor

== Austria ==
See also: List of German-language playwrights; List of German-language authors; List of Austrian writers

- (1791–1872) Franz Grillparzer
- (1801–1862) Johann Nestroy
- (1814–1874) Friedrich Kaiser
- (1839–1889) Ludwig Anzengruber
- (1863–1934) Hermann Bahr
- (1866–1945) Richard Beer-Hofmann
- (1874–1929) Hugo von Hofmannsthal
- (1874–1936) Karl Kraus
- (1880–1942) Robert Musil
- (1885–1969) Franz Theodor Csokor
- (1886–1980) Oskar Kokoschka
- (1891–1958) Ferdinand Bruckner
- (1895–1959) Arnolt Bronnen
- (1897–1976) Alexander Lernet-Holenia
- (1901–1938) Ödön von Horváth
- (1911–1986) Fritz Hochwälder
- (1921–1988) Erich Fried
- (1941–2005) Wolfgang Bauer
- (born 1942) Peter Handke
- (born 1944) Peter Turrini

== Azerbaijan ==
See also: List of Azerbaijani dramatists and playwrights

- (1854–1926) Najaf bey Vazirov
- (1865–1927) Sakina Akhundzadeh
- (1870–1930) Abdurrahim bey Hagverdiyev
- (1872–1950) Mammed Said Ordubadi
- (1874–1918) Abbas Sahhat
- (1875–1939) Suleyman Sani Akhundov
- (1879–1945) Huseyngulu Sarabski
- (1882–1941) Huseyn Javid
- (1899–1934) Jafar Jabbarly
- (1910–1981) Rasul Rza
- (1911–1993) Mirza Ibrahimov
- (1913–1981) Nigar Rafibeyli
- (1927–2025) Vidadi Babanli
- (1935–2016) Magsud Ibrahimbeyov
- (born 1937) Hamid Arzulu
- (born 1938) Anar Rzayev
- (born 1949) Natig Rasulzadeh
- (born 1957) Afag Masud

== Bangladesh ==
- (1908–1990) Natyaguru Nurul Momen
- (1925–1971) Munir Chowdhury
- (1942–2008) Abdullah Al Mamun
- (1935–2019) Momtazuddin Ahmed
- (born 1948) Mamunur Rashid
- (1949–2008) Selim Al Deen

== Belarus ==
- (1880–1948) Peretz Hirschbein
- (1888–1962) H. Leivick

== Belgium ==
- (1862–1949) Maurice Maeterlinck
- (1885–1970) Fernand Crommelynck
- (1898–1962) Michel de Ghelderode
- (1913–2012) Félicien Marceau
- (1945–1999) Michèle Fabien
- (born 1960) Éric-Emmanuel Schmitt

== Bosnia and Herzegovina ==
- (born 1955) Zlatko Topčić
- (1944–2024) Abdulah Sidran
- (1950–2015) Safet Plakalo
- (born 1962) Nenad Veličković

== Brazil ==
- (1815–1848) Martins Pena
- (1831–1852) Álvares de Azevedo
- (1839–1908) Machado de Assis
- (1857–1913) Aluísio Azevedo
- (1912–1980) Nelson Rodrigues
- (1923–2012) Millôr Fernandes
- (1927–2014) Ariano Suassuna
- (1931–2009) Augusto Boal
- (1948–1996) Caio Fernando Abreu

== Canada ==
See also: List of Canadian playwrights; List of Canadian writers; List of Quebec writers; List of French Canadian writers from outside Quebec; List of Canadian plays

- (1893–1975) Merrill Denison
- (1909–1999) Gratien Gélinas
- (1913–1995) Robertson Davies
- (1930–2016) Marcel Dubé
- (born 1953) Louise Bombardier
- (born 1961) Vittorio Rossi
- (born 1964) David Gow

== Czech Republic ==
See also: List of Czech writers

- (1884–1968) Max Brod
- (1889–1942) Paul Kornfeld
- (1890–1938) Karel Čapek
- (1936–2011) Václav Havel

== Denmark ==
See also: List of Danish authors

- (1684–1754) Ludvig Holberg
- (1779–1850) Adam Gottlob Oehlenschläger
- (1791–1860) Johan Ludvig Heiberg
- (1797–1870) Henrik Hertz
- (1898–1944) Kaj Munk
- (1901–1961) Kjeld Abell

== Dominica ==
- (1948–2023) Alwin Bully

== Egypt ==
- (1835–1902) Abu Khalil Qabbani

== France ==
See also: List of French playwrights; List of French-language authors

- (died c. 1210) Jean Bodel
- (c. 1237–c. 1288) Adam de la Halle
- (c. 1470/80–c. 1538/39) Pierre Gringoire
- (1532–1573) Étienne Jodelle
- (c. 1535–c. 1607) Jean de La Taille
- (1540–1619) Pierre de Larivey
- (1544–1590) Robert Garnier
- (c. 1570–1632) Alexandre Hardy
- (1595–1676) Jean Desmaretz de Saint-Sorlin
- (1601–1667) Georges de Scudéry
- (1604–1686) Jean Mairet
- (1606–1658) Pierre Du Ryer
- (1606–1684) Pierre Corneille
- (1622–1673) Molière
- (1625–1709) Thomas Corneille
- (1635–1688) Philippe Quinault
- (1638–1701) Edme Boursault
- (1639–1699) Jean Racine
- (1640–1723) David-Augustin de Brueys
- (1650–1721) Jean Palaprat
- (1654–1724) Charles Rivière Dufresny
- (1659–1741) Augustin Nadal
- (1661–1725) Florent Carton Dancourt
- (1665–1707) Madame Ulrich
- (1668–1747) Alain-René Lesage
- (1674–1762) Prosper Jolyot de Crébillon
- (1680–1754) Philippe Néricault Destouches
- (1688–1763) Pierre Carlet de Marivaux
- (1692–1754) Pierre-Claude Nivelle de La Chaussée
- (1694–1778) Voltaire
- (1709–1777) Jean-Baptiste Louis Gresset
- (1713–1784) Denis Diderot
- (1732–1799) Pierre de Beaumarchais
- (1740–1814) Louis-Sébastien Mercier
- (1750–1794) Philippe François Nazaire Fabre d'Églantine
- (1793–1843) Casimir-Jean-François Delavigne
- (1798–1855) Adam Mickiewicz
- (1799–1850) Honoré de Balzac
- (1802–1870) Alexandre Dumas, père
- (1802–1885) Victor Hugo
- (1804–1876) George Sand
- (1805–1882) Henri Auguste Barbier
- (1810–1857) Alfred de Musset
- (1811–1899) Adolphe Philippe d'Ennery
- (1812–1859) Zygmunt Krasiński
- (1815–1888) Eugène Marin Labiche
- (1820–1889) Émile Augier
- (1823–1891) Théodore de Banville
- (1824–1895) Alexandre Dumas, fils
- (1831–1897) Henri Meilhac
- (1834–1908) Ludovic Halévy
- (1837–1899) Henry Becque
- (1840–1897) Alphonse Daudet
- (1842–1908) François Coppée
- (1848–1912) Alexandre Bisson
- (1848–1917) Octave Mirbeau
- (1848–1918) Georges Ohnet
- (1853–1914) Jules Lemaître
- (1854–1928) François de Curel
- (1857–1915) Paul Hervieu
- (1858–1922) Alfred Capus
- (1858–1929) Georges Courteline
- (1858–1932) Eugène Brieux
- (1859–1940) Henri Lavedan
- (1859–1945) Maurice Donnay
- (1861–1949) Lucien Descaves
- (1862–1921) Georges Feydeau
- (1862–1949) Maurice Maeterlinck
- (1866–1947) Tristan Bernard
- (1868–1918) Edmond Rostand
- (1868–1955) Paul Claudel
- (1869–1915) Gaston de Caillavet
- (1869–1955) Émile Fabre
- (1872–1922) Henri Bataille
- (1872–1927) Robert de Flers
- (1873–1907) Alfred Jarry
- (1875–1937) Henri Duvernois
- (1875–1944) Henri Ghéon
- (1876–1953) Henri Bernstein
- (1877–1937) Francis de Croisset
- (1879–1949) Jacques Copeau
- (1880–1918) Guillaume Apollinaire
- (1881–1958) Roger Martin du Gard
- (1882–1941) James Joyce
- (1882–1944) Jean Giraudoux
- (1882–1951) Henri-René Lenormand
- (1882–1962) René Fauchois
- (1884–1973) Alexandre Arnoux
- (1885–1957) Sacha Guitry
- (1885–1970) François Mauriac
- (1886–1970) Fernand Crommelynck
- (1887–1945) Édouard Bourdet
- (1888–1972) Jean-Jacques Bernard
- (1889–1963) Jean Cocteau
- (1889–1973) Gabriel Marcel
- (1890–1974) André Birabeau
- (1892–1975) André Obey
- (1894–1972) Jacques Deval
- (1895–1970) Jean Giono
- (1896–1948) Antonin Artaud
- (1896–1972) Henry de Montherlant
- (1899–1965) Jacques Audiberti
- (1899–1974) Marcel Achard
- (1900–1982) Georges Neveux
- (1900–1998) Julien Green
- (1902–1967) Marcel Aymé
- (1905–1980) Jean-Paul Sartre
- (1906–1989) Samuel Beckett
- (1908–1970) Arthur Adamov
- (1909–1988) Thierry Maulnier
- (1909–1994) Eugène Ionesco
- (1910–1986) Jean Genet
- (1910–1987) Jean Anouilh
- (1912–1998) Félix Morisseau-Leroy
- (1913–1960) Albert Camus
- (1913–2012) Félicien Marceau
- (1914–1996) Marguerite Duras
- (1917–1987) Georges Arnaud
- (1920–2011) Jean Dutourd
- (1924–2017) Armand Gatti
- (1927–1991) François Billetdoux
- (1930–2013) Sławomir Mrożek

== Georgia ==
See also: List of Georgian writers

- (1802–1869) Alexander Orbeliani
- (1813–1864) Giorgi Eristavi
- (1824–1901) Raphael Eristavi
- (1862–1931) David Kldiashvili
- (1882–1962) Grigol Robakidze
- (1904–1938) Gerzel Baazov
- (born 1977) Lasha Bugadze
- (born 1980) Nestan Kvinikadze

== Germany ==
See also: List of German-language playwrights; List of German-language authors

- (1616–1664) Andreas Gryphius
- (1700–1766) Johann Christoph Gottsched
- (1724–1803) Friedrich Gottlieb Klopstock
- (1729–1781) Gotthold Ephraim Lessing
- (1737–1823) Heinrich Wilhelm von Gerstenberg
- (1749–1825) Maler Müller
- (1749–1832) Johann Wolfgang von Goethe
- (1751–1792) Jakob Lenz
- (1752–1806) Johann Anton Leisewitz
- (1752–1831) Friedrich Maximilian von Klinger
- (1759–1805) Friedrich Schiller
- (1759–1814) August Wilhelm Iffland
- (1761–1819) August von Kotzebue
- (1770–1843) Friedrich Hölderlin
- (1774–1829) Amandus Gottfried Adolf Müllner
- (1777–1811) Heinrich von Kleist
- (1788–1857) Baron Joseph von Eichendorff
- (1796–1840) Karl Immermann
- (1801–1836) Christian Dietrich Grabbe
- (1806–1884) Heinrich Laube
- (1811–1878) Karl Ferdinand Gutzkow
- (1813–1837) Georg Büchner
- (1813–1863) Friedrich Hebbel
- (1813–1865) Otto Ludwig
- (1816–1895) Gustav Freytag
- (1839–1911) Martin Greif
- (1862–1946) Gerhart Hauptmann
- (1865–1944) Max Halbe
- (1866–1933) Paul Ernst
- (1870–1938) Ernst Barlach
- (1876–1947) Ernst Hardt
- (1878–1945) Georg Kaiser
- (1882–1961) Leonhard Frank
- (1884–1958) Lion Feuchtwanger
- (1886–1969) Johannes von Guenther
- (1887–1945) Bruno Frank
- (1888–1960) Curt Goetz
- (1889–1942) Paul Kornfeld
- (1890–1940) Walter Hasenclever
- (1894–1959) Hans Henny Jahnn
- (1895–1952) Alfred Neumann
- (1898–1956) Bertolt Brecht
- (1901–1938) Ödön von Horváth
- (1906–1970) Stefan Andres
- (1906–1972) Eberhard Wolfgang Möller
- (1910–1990) Ulrich Becher
- (1916–1991) Wolfgang Hildesheimer
- (1921–1947) Wolfgang Borchert
- (1925–2017) Tankred Dorst
- (1927–2015) Günter Grass
- (1928–2003) Peter Hacks
- (1931–2020) Rolf Hochhuth

== Ghana ==
- (1912–1998) Félix Morisseau-Leroy
- (1924–1978) Joe de Graft
- (1924–1996) Efua Sutherland
- (1942–2023) Ama Ata Aidoo
- (1946–2018) Asiedu Yirenkyi

== Greece ==
See also: List of Greek artists

- (c. 525 BC–c. 456 BC) Aeschylus
- (c. 495 BC–c. 406 BC) Sophocles
- (c. 485 BC–c. 406 BC) Euripides
- (c. 448 BC–c. 400 BC) Agathon
- (c. 445 BC–c. 385 BC) Aristophanes
- (c. 343 BC–c. 290 BC) Menander

== Haiti ==
- (1912–1998) Félix Morisseau-Leroy

== Hungary ==
See also: List of Hungarian writers

- (1747–1811) György Bessenyei
- (1773–1885) Mihály Csokonai Vitéz
- (1786–1839) Izidor Guzmics
- (1788–1830) Károly Kisfaludy
- (1791–1830) József Katona
- (1800–1855) Mihály Vörösmarty
- (1800–1866) Gergely Czuczor
- (1814–1878) Ede Szigligeti
- (1823–1864) Imre Madách
- (1842–1891) Gergely Csíky
- (1845–1918) Lajos Dóczi
- (1863–1954) Ferenc Herczeg
- (1869–1944) Dezső Szomory
- (1878–1952) Ferenc Molnár
- (1880–1974) Melchior Lengyel
- (1888–1967) Lajos Egri
- (1890–1942) Sándor Hunyady
- (1900–1975) Gyula Háy
- (1901–1938) Ödön von Horváth
- (1901–1975) László Németh
- (1902–1983) Gyula Illyés
- (1912–1979) István Örkény
- (1917–2007) Magda Szabó
- (1927–2006) András Sütő
- (1930–1989) Erzsébet Galgóczi
- (1932–2002) János Nyíri
- (1934–2012) István Csurka
- (1934–2022) György Moldova
- (born 1942) Péter Nádas
- (1943–2010) György Schwajda
- (born 1946) György Spiró
- (born 1950) Miklós Vámos
- (born 1953) Lajos Parti Nagy
- (born 1960) Zsolt Pozsgai

== India ==
- (1861–1941) Rabindranath Tagore
- (1938–2019) Girish Karnad

== Iran ==
- (born 1938) Bahram Bayzai
- (1939–2007) Akbar Radi
- (born 1952) Rosie Malek-Yonan
- (born 1954) Monica Malek-Yonan

== Iraq ==
- (1867–1950) Pîremêrd

== Ireland ==
See also: List of Irish dramatists; List of writers from Northern Ireland

- (1728–1774) Oliver Goldsmith
- (1735–1812) Isaac Bickerstaffe
- (1784–1862) James Sheridan Knowles
- (c. 1820–1890) Dion Boucicault
- (1852–1932) Lady Gregory
- (1852–1933) George Moore
- (1853–1923) William Boyle
- (1854–1900) Oscar Wilde
- (1856–1950) George Bernard Shaw
- (1859–1923) Edward Martyn
- (1860–1949) Douglas Hyde
- (1865–1939) W. B. Yeats
- (1871–1909) John Millington Synge
- (1873–1956) James Cousins
- (1873–1959) T. C. Murray
- (1874–1949) Tadhg Ó Donnchadha
- (1876–1913) Fred Ryan
- (1877–1963) George Fitzmaurice
- (1878–1916) Thomas MacDonagh
- (1878–1957) Edward Plunkett, 18th Baron of Dunsany Lord Dunsany
- (1880–1964) Seán O'Casey
- (1881–1972) Padraic Colum
- (1882–1941) James Joyce
- (1883–1971) St. John Ervine
- (1886–1958) Lennox Robinson
- (1890–1963) Brinsley MacNamara
- (1899–1978) Micheál MacLíammóir
- (1900–1968) Paul Vincent Carroll
- (1901–1984) Denis Johnston
- (1902–1961) Edward Pakenham, 6th Earl of Longford
- (1906–1989) Samuel Beckett
- (1910–2001) Joseph O'Conor
- (1912–1968) Donagh MacDonagh
- (1923–1964) Brendan Behan
- (1926–2009) Hugh Leonard
- (1928–2002) John B. Keane
- (1929–2015) Brian Friel
- (1934–2023) Thomas Kilroy
- (1935–2018) Tom Murphy
- (born 1949) Billy Roche
- (born 1952) Peter Sheridan
- (born 1953) Frank McGuinness
- (born 1964) Marina Carr
- (born 1967) Enda Walsh
- (born 1971) Conor McPherson
- (born 1971) Jimmy Murphy

== Israel ==
See also: List of Hebrew language playwrights; List of Hebrew language authors

- (1884–1968) Max Brod
- (1900–1973) Avraham Shlonsky
- (1910–1970) Nathan Alterman
- (1924–2005) Ephraim Kishon
- (1926–1998) Nisim Aloni
- (born 1935) Dan Almagor
- (1936–2022) A. B. Yehoshua
- (born 1939) Yehoshua Sobol
- (1943–1999) Hanoch Levin
- (born 1954) Shmuel Hasfari
- (born 1976) Maya Arad Yasur

== Italy ==
See also: List of Italian writers

- (c. 1230–1306) Jacopone da Todi
- (1261–1329) Albertino Mussato
- (1469–1527) Niccolò Machiavelli
- (1470–1520) Bernardo Dovizio da Bibbiena
- (1474–1533) Ludovico Ariosto
- (1492–1556) Pietro Aretino
- (1492–1573) Donato Giannotti
- (1503–1584) Anton Francesco Grazzini
- (1504–1573) Giambattista Giraldi Cinthio
- (1507–1566) Annibale Caro
- (1508–c. 1568) Ludovico Dolce
- (c. 1525–c. 1586) Giovanni Battista Cini
- (1535–1615) Giambattista Della Porta
- (1538–1612) Gian Battista Guarini
- (1541–1585) Luigi Groto
- (1548–1600) Giordano Bruno
- (1568–1642) Michelangelo Buonarroti the Younger
- (1576–1654) Giovan Battista Andreini
- (1675–1755) Francesco Scipione, marchese di Maffei
- (1698–1782) Pietro Metastasio
- (1707–1793) Carlo Goldoni
- (1712–1785) Pietro Chiari
- (1720–1806) Carlo Gozzi
- (1728–1787) Ferdinando Galiani
- (1749–1803) Vittorio Alfieri
- (1754–1828) Vincenzo Monti
- (1776–1834) Giovanni Giraud
- (1778–1827) Ugo Foscolo
- (1785–1873) Alessandro Manzoni
- (1800–1846) Carlo Marenco
- (1816–1882) Paolo Giacometti
- (1822–1889) Paolo Ferrari
- (1830–1881) Pietro Cossa
- (1839–1915) Luigi Capuana
- (1842–1911) Antonio Fogazzaro
- (1847–1906) Giuseppe Giacosa
- (1852–1909) Alfredo Oriani
- (1860–1934) Salvatore Di Giacomo
- (1861–1943) Roberto Bracco
- (1863–1938) Gabriele D'Annunzio
- (1867–1927) Augusto Novelli
- (1867–1936) Luigi Pirandello
- (1874–1934) Dario Niccodemi
- (1876–1944) Filippo Tommaso Marinetti
- (1877–1949) Sem Benelli
- (1878–1960) Massimo Bontempelli
- (1880–1918) Guillaume Apollinaire
- (1880–1947) Luigi Chiarelli
- (1882–1921) Ercole Luigi Morselli
- (1892–1953) Ugo Betti
- (1898–1992) Valentino Bompiani
- (1900–1984) Eduardo De Filippo
- (1907–1954) Vitaliano Brancati
- (1911–1980) Diego Fabbri
- (1911–2007) Gian Carlo Menotti
- (1916–1991) Natalia Ginzburg
- (1922–1975) Pier Paolo Pasolini
- (1926–2016) Dario Fo

== Japan ==
See also: List of Japanese writers

- (1363–1443) Seami Motokiyo Zeami}
- (1653–1725) Chikamatsu Monzaemon

== Kurdistan ==
- (1867–1950) Pîremêrd

== Latvia ==
- (1751–1792) Jakob Michael Reinhold Lenz

== Lebanon ==
- (1933–2017) Jalal Khoury

== Lithuania ==
- (1882–1957) Antanas Vienuolis
- (1882–1954) Vincas Krėvė-Mickevičius
- (1893–1967) Vincas Mykolaitis-Putinas
- (1910–1961) Antanas Škėma
- (1930–2011) Justinas Marcinkevičius
- (1950–2002) Ričardas Gavelis

== Macedonia ==
- (1964–1989) Blagoje "Bill" Neskovski

== Mexico ==
- (born 1973) Conchi León

== Morocco ==
See also: List of Moroccan writers

- (1938–2009) Abdelkebir Khatibi
- (1938–2016) Tayeb Seddiki
- (born 1953) Abdallah Zrika

== Nepal ==
See also: List of Nepali writers

- (1903–1981) Balkrishna Sama
- (1909–1959) Laxmi Prasad Devkota
- (born 1945) Abhi Subedi
- (born 1967) Suman Pokhrel

== Netherlands ==
See also: List of Dutch language writers

- (1454–1507)? Peter van Diest
- (1487–1558) Macropedius
- (1522–1590) Dirck Coornhert
- (1579–1665) Samuel Coster
- (1581–1647) Pieter Corneliszoon Hooft
- (1584–1635) Willem van Nieulandt II
- (1585–1618) Gerbrand Bredero
- (1587–1679) Joost van den Vondel
- (1601–1646) Jan Harmenszoon Krul
- (1612–1667) Jan Vos
- (1629–1681) Lodewijk Meyer
- (1631–1669) Catharina Questiers
- (1639–1672) Joan Blasius
- (1640–1670) Willem Godschalck van Focquenbroch
- (1640–1709) Pieter Nuyts
- (1649–1713) Govert Bidloo
- (1664–1721) Abraham Alewijn
- (1682–1729) Maria de Wilde
- (1683–1756) Pieter Langendijk
- (1688–1727) Hermanus Angelkot Jr.
- (1759–1837) Jan van Walré
- (1854–1938) August Kiehl
- (1864–1924) Herman Heijermans
- (1869–1948) Victor Ido
- (1869–1952) Henriette Roland Holst
- (1871–1964) Jan Fabricius
- (1872–1929) Inte Onsman
- (1878–1942) Rudolf Besier
- (1882–1937) Henri van Wermeskerken
- (1885–1963) Herman Bouber
- (1891–1966) Watse Cuperus
- (1893–1989) Abel Herzberg
- (1896–1962) Maurits Dekker
- (1911–1995) Annie M. G. Schmidt
- (1912–1993) Max Croiset
- (1918–1992) Hans Heyting
- (1927–2010) Harry Mulisch
- (born 1934) Judith Herzberg
- (born 1938) Thea Doelwijt
- (1939–2014) Seth Gaaikema
- (1943–1995) Ischa Meijer
- (1944–2012) Gerrit Komrij
- (born 1946) Adriaan van Dis
- (born 1946) Paul Haenen
- (born 1946) Wim T. Schippers
- (born 1951) Willem Jan Otten
- (born 1952) Alex van Warmerdam
- (born 1952) Vonne van der Meer
- (born 1954) Youp van 't Hek
- (born 1956) Arjan Ederveen
- (born 1971) Arnon Grunberg

== Nigeria ==
- (born 1934) Wole Soyinka
- (1941–1995) Ken Saro-Wiwa
- (born 1948) Bode Sowande
- (born 1964) Sefi Atta
- (1967–2022) Biyi Bandele
- (fl. 2008) Tracie Chima Utoh

== Norway ==
See also: List of Norwegian writers

- (1684–1754) Ludvig Holberg
- (1828–1906) Henrik Ibsen
- (1832–1910) Bjornstjerne Bjornson
- (1857–1929) Gunnar Heiberg
- (1889–1962) Helge Krog
- (1902–1943) Nordahl Grieg

== Pakistan ==
- (1914–1999) Mirza Adeeb
- (1941–2021) Haseena Moin

== Poland ==
See also: List of Polish language authors

- (1616–1664) Andreas Gryphius
- (1793–1876) Aleksander Fredro
- (1798–1855) Adam Mickiewicz
- (c. 1800–c. 1855) Solomon Ettinger
- (1809–1849) Juliusz Słowacki
- (1811–1899) Abraham Dov Ber Gotlober
- (1812–1859) Zygmunt Krasiński
- (1820–1869) Apollo Korzeniowski
- (1860–1921) Gabriela Zapolska
- (1868–1927) Stanisław Przybyszewski
- (1869–1907) Stanisław Wyspiański
- (1874–1915) Jerzy Żuławski
- (1880–1957) Sholem Asch
- (1885–1939) Stanisław Ignacy Witkiewicz (Witkacy)
- (1904–1969) Witold Gombrowicz
- (1920–2005) Karol Wojtyła (Pope John Paul II)
- (1930–2013) Sławomir Mrożek
- (1938–2017) Janusz Głowacki
- (1989) Weronika Murek

== Portugal ==
See also: List of Portuguese language authors

- (1465–1536) Gil Vicente
- (1799–1854) João Batista de Almeida Garrett
- (1906–1997) António Gedeão
- (1922–2010) José Saramago

== Romania ==
See also: List of Romanian playwrights and List of Romanian writers

- (1821–1890) Vasile Alecsandri
- (1840–1908) Abraham Haim Lipke Goldfaden
- (1852–1912) Ion Luca Caragiale
- (1858–1918) Barbu Delavrancea
- (1909–1994) Eugène Ionesco

== Russia ==
See also: List of Russian language writers

- (c. 1745–1792) Denis Ivanovich Fonvizin
- (1751–1792) Jakob Lenz
- (1752–1831) Friedrich Maximilian von Klinger
- (1795–1829) Aleksandr Sergeyevich Griboyedov
- (1809–1852) Nikolay Vasilyevich Gogol
- (1814–1841) Mikhail Yuryevich Lermontov
- (1823–1886) Aleksandr Nikolayevich Ostrovsky
- (1856–1909) Innokenty Fyodorovich Annensky
- (1860–1904) Anton Pavlovich Chekhov
- (1863–1920) S. Anski
- (1868–1936) Maxim Gorky
- (1871–1919) Leonid Nikolayevich Andreyev
- (1880–1921) Aleksandr Aleksandrovich Blok
- (1880–1948) Peretz Hirschbein
- (1888–1962) H. Leivick
- (1891–1940) Mikhail Afanasyevich Bulgakov
- (1893–1930) Vladimir Vladimirovich Mayakovsky
- (1894–1941) Isaak Emmanuilovich Babel
- (1895–1963) Vsevolod Vyacheslavovich Ivanov
- (1897–1986) Valentin Petrovich Katayev
- (1899–1994) Leonid Maksimovich Leonov
- (1904–1941) Aleksandr Nikolayevich Afinogenov

== Senegal ==
- (1912–1998) Félix Morisseau-Leroy

== Serbia ==
- (1791–1847) Sima Milutinović Sarajlija
- (1793–1830) Georgije Magarašević
- (1806–1956) Jovan Sterija Popović
- (1818–1903) Matija Ban
- (1832–1878) Đura Jakšić
- (1843–1875) Kosta Trifković
- (1847–1908) Milovan Glišić
- (1858–1926) Dragutin Ilić
- (1864–1938) Branislav Nušić
- (1884–1968) Vojislav Jovanović Marambo
- (1886–1974) Velimir Živojinović Massuka
- (1887–1952) Mir-Jam
- (1888–1969) Toma Smiljanić-Bradina
- (1895–1976) Vladimir Velmar-Janković
- (1900–1924) Dušan Vasiljev
- (1924–1989) Mira Trailović
- (1928–2009) Danko Popović
- (1929–2009) Milorad Pavić
- (1930–1992) Borislav Pekić
- (1933–2014) Svetlana Velmar-Janković
- (1938–2019) Gordan Mihić
- (1938) Svetozar Vlajković
- (1940–2025) Filip David
- (1940–2023) Miodrag Novaković
- (1941–1991) Milan Milišić
- (1941) Vida Ognjenović
- (1948–2023) Zorica Jevremović
- (1948) Dušan Kovačević
- (1948–2021) Bratislav Petković
- (1948) Božidar Zečević
- (1950) Stojan Srdić
- (1951–2015) Mladen Dražetin
- (1954) Siniša Kovačević
- (1954) Radoslav Pavlović
- (1959) Branislav Pipović
- (1969) Đorđe Milosavljević
- (1969) Zoran Stefanović
- (1970) Branislava Ilić

== Slovenia ==
See also: List of Slovenian playwrights

- (1831–1887) Fran Levstik
- (1871–1962) Fran Saleški Finžgar
- (1876–1918) Ivan Cankar
- (1878–1949) Oton Župančič
- (1930–1987) Gregor Strniša
- (born 1948) Drago Jančar

== Spain ==
See also: List of Spanish language authors

- (c. 1469–1530) Juan del Encina
- (1474–1542) Lucas Fernández
- (1547–1616) Miguel de Cervantes
- (c. 1550–1610) Juan de la Cueva
- (1562–1635) Lope de Vega
- (1569–1631) Guillén de Castro y Bellvís
- (1569–c. 1644) Feliciana Enríquez de Guzmán
- (c. 1574–1644) Antonio Mira de Amescua
- (c. 1575–1648) Tirso de Molina
- (1587–1650) Luis de Belmonte y Bermúdez
- (1596–1661) Álvaro Cubillo de Aragón
- (1600–1681) Pedro Calderón de la Barca
- (1611–1652) Antonio Coello y Ochoa
- (1618–1669) Agustín Moreto y Cabaña
- (1622–1714) Juan Claudio de la Hoz y Mota
- (1625–1687) Juan Bautista Diamante
- (1662–1704) Francisco Antonio Bances y López-Candamo
- (1676–1750) José de Cañizares
- (1731–1794) Ramón de la Cruz
- (1734–1787) Vicente Antonio García de la Huerta
- (1737–1780) Nicolás Fernández de Moratín
- (1760–1828) Leandro Fernández de Moratín
- (1787–1862) Francisco Martínez de la Rosa
- (1793–1861) Antonio Gil y Zárate
- (1796–1873) Manuel Bretón de los Herreros
- (1806–1880) Juan Eugenio Hartzenbusch y Martínez
- (1809–1837) Mariano José de Larra y Sánchez de Castro
- (1813–1884) Antonio García Gutiérrez
- (1828–1879) Adelardo López de Ayala y Herrera
- (1832–1916) José Echegaray
- (1834–1903) Gaspar Núñez de Arce
- (1863–1917) Joaquín Dicenta y Benedicto
- (1866–1936) Ramón del Valle-Inclán
- (1866–1943) Carlos Arniches y Barrera
- (1866–1954) Jacinto Benavente
- (1871–1938) Serafín Álvarez Quintero
- (1873–1944) Joaquín Álvarez Quintero
- (1874–1947) Manuel Machado
- (1875–1939) Antonio Machado
- (1877–1958) Jacinto Grau Delgado
- (1879–1946) Eduardo Marquina
- (1881–1936) Pedro Muñoz Seca
- (1881–1947) Gregorio Martínez Sierra
- (1897–1975) Juan Ignacio Luca de Tena
- (1898–1936) Federico García Lorca
- (1899–1967) Edgar Neville
- (1901–1952) Enrique Jardiel Poncela
- (1902–1999) Rafael Alberti
- (1903–1965) Alejandro Casona
- (1903–1996) José López Rubio
- (1905–1977) Miguel Mihura Santos
- (1916–2000) Antonio Buero Vallejo
- (born 1932) Fernando Arrabal
- (1943–2021) Alfonso Vallejo

=== Catalonia ===
See also: List of Catalan-language writers

- (1845–1924) Àngel Guimerà

== Sweden ==
See also: List of Swedish language writers

- (1849–1912) August Strindberg
- (1883–1931) Hjalmar Bergman
- (1891–1974) Pär Lagerkvist
- (1918–1997) Werner Aspenström
- (1923–1954) Stig Dagerman
- (1928–2007) Lars Forssell
- Ninna Tinsman

== Switzerland ==
- (1882–1941) James Joyce
- (1886–1980) Oskar Kokoschka
- (1911–1986) Fritz Hochwälder
- (1911–1991) Max Frisch
- (1921–1990) Friedrich Dürrenmatt

== Syria ==
- (1835–1902) Abu Khalil Qabbani

== Turkey ==
- (1850–1904) Sami Frashëri
- (1867–1950) Pîremêrd
- (born 1986) Hayati Citaklar

== Ukraine ==
- (1811–1899) Abraham Dov Ber Gotlober
- (1840–1908) Abraham Haim Lipke Goldfaden
- (1853–1909) Jacob Gordin
- (1871–1913) Lesya Ukrainka
- (born 1971) Eugenia Chuprina

== United Kingdom ==
See also: List of British playwrights; British playwrights since 1950; List of early-modern British women playwrights

=== England ===
See also: List of English writers

- (c. 1460–1502) Henry Medwall
- (1495–1563) John Bale
- (c. 1497–c. 1585) John Heywood
- (1532–1584) Thomas Norton
- (1535–1577) George Gascoigne
- (c. 1553–1606) John Lyly
- (1558–1592) Robert Greene
- (1558–1594) Thomas Kyd
- (c. 1560–1634) George Chapman
- (1563–1631) Michael Drayton
- (1564–1593) Christopher Marlowe
- (1564–1616) William Shakespeare
- (c. 1570–1641) Thomas Heywood
- (c. 1572–1632) Thomas Dekker
- (1572–1637) Ben Jonson
- (1576–1634) John Marston
- (1579–1625) John Fletcher
- (1580–1627) Thomas Middleton
- (1583–1640) Philip Massinger
- (c. 1585–1616) Francis Beaumont
- (c. 1585–after 1639) John Ford
- (c. 1590–c. 1653) Richard Brome
- (1606–1668) William Davenant
- (1631–1700) John Dryden
- (c. 1635–1691) George Etherege
- (1640–1689) Aphra Behn
- (c. 1640–c. 1703) John Crowne
- (1652–1685) Thomas Otway
- (c. 1653–1692) Nathaniel Lee
- (c. 1667–1723) Susannah Centlivre
- (1670–1729) William Congreve
- (1671–1757) Colley Cibber
- (1672–1719) Joseph Addison
- (c. 1678–1707) George Farquhar
- (1685–1732) John Gay
- (1693–1739) George Lillo
- (c. 1700–1766) William Rufus Chetwood
- (1707–1754) Henry Fielding
- (1717–1779) David Garrick
- (1720–1777) Samuel Foote
- (1728–1774) Oliver Goldsmith
- (1732–1794) George Colman the Elder
- (1732–1811) Richard Cumberland
- (born 1773) Anna Ross
- (1784–1862) James Sheridan Knowles
- (1788–1824) George Gordon Byron, 6th Baron Byron (Lord Byron)
- (1792–1847) Richard Brinsley Peake
- (1794–1857) William Thomas Moncrieff
- (1803–1857) Douglas William Jerrold
- (1803–1873) Edward Bulwer-Lytton, 1st Baron Lytton
- (before 1810–after 1838) Elizabeth Polack
- (1817–1880) Tom Taylor
- (1812–1889) Robert Browning
- (1814–1884) Charles Reade
- (1836–1911) W. S. Gilbert
- (1843–1916) Henry James
- (1848–1914) Sydney Grundy
- (1851–1929) Henry Arthur Jones
- (1852–1932) Lady Augusta Gregory (Lady Gregory)
- (1853–1931) Hall Caine
- (1859–1927) Jerome K. Jerome
- (1860–1917) Florence Farr
- (1860–1937) Sir James Matthew Barrie
- (1865–1948) Alfred Edward Woodley Mason
- (1865–1959) Laurence Housman
- (1866–1945) Mrs Henry de la Pasture
- (1867–1931) Arnold Bennett
- (1867–1933) John Galsworthy
- (1868–1946) Herbert Swears
- (1869–1909) St. John Emile Clavering Hankin
- (1877–1946) Harley Granville-Barker
- (1878–1942) Rudolph Besier
- (1878–1957) Edward Plunkett, 18th Baron of Dunsany (Lord Dunsany)
- (1878–1967) John Masefield
- (1881–1913) William Stanley Houghton
- (1881–1954) Frederick Lonsdale
- (1882–1937) John Drinkwater
- (1882–1956) A. A. Milne
- (1882–1958) Harold Brighouse
- (1883–1971) St. John Ervine
- (1884–1915) James Elroy Flecker
- (1886–1962) Clifford Bax
- (1886–1980) Oskar Kokoschka
- (1888–1965) Clemence Dane
- (1888–1965) T. S. Eliot
- (1889–1946) John Colton
- (1890–1976) Agatha Christie
- (1893–1951) Ivor Novello
- (1893–1964) Will Scott
- (1894–1984) J. B. Priestley
- (1896–1967) Margaret Kennedy
- (1896–1975) R. C. Sherriff
- (1899–1973) Noël Coward
- (1900–1973) Benn W. Levy
- (1901–1984) Denis Johnston
- (1902–1961) Edward Pakenham, 6th Earl of Longford
- (1904–1986) Christopher Isherwood
- (1904–1991) Graham Greene
- (1907–1973) W. H. Auden
- (1907–2005) Christopher Fry
- (1911–1977) Terence Rattigan
- (1921–1988) Erich Fried
- (1923–2009) John Mortimer
- (1924–1995) Robert Bolt
- (1924–2006) David Campton
- (1924–2009) Royce Ryton
- (1925–1994) Alun Owen
- (1926–1999) Jim Allen
- (1926–2001) Anthony Shaffer
- (1926–2016) Peter Shaffer
- (1927–2017) Ann Jellicoe
- (1927–2019) Peter Nichols
- (1928–1996) Frank Marcus
- (1929–1994) John Osborne
- (1929–1998) Henry Livings
- (1930–2008) Harold Pinter
- (1930–2012) John Arden
- (1933–1967) Joe Orton
- (born 1933) Michael Frayn
- (born 1934) Alan Bennett
- (1934–2024) Edward Bond
- (born 1934) Wole Soyinka
- (1936–2008) Simon Gray
- (born 1937) Tom Stoppard
- (1938–2011) Shelagh Delaney
- (born 1939) Alan Ayckbourn
- (1945–2019) Barrie Keeffe
- (born 1942) Howard Brenton
- (born 1947) David Hare
- (born 1957) Sue Lenier
- (born 1964) Helen Edmundson
- (1971–1999) Sarah Kane
- (born 1974) Leo Butler

=== Scotland ===
See also: List of Scottish dramatists

- (c. 1490–c. 1555) David Lyndsay
- (1860–1937) J. M. Barrie
- (1888–1951) James Bridie
- (1900–1968) Paul Vincent Carroll
- (1907–1985) Robert McLellan
- (1912–2006) Ena Lamont Stewart
- (1918–1978) Joan Ure
- (born 1951) Peter May

=== Wales ===
See also: List of Welsh writers

- (1893–1951) Ivor Novello
- (1925–1994) Alun Owen
- (1893–1985) Saunders Lewis

== United States ==
See also: List of playwrights from the United States; List of African-American writers; List of Jewish American playwrights

- (1766–1839) William Dunlap
- (1784–1842) Samuel Woodworth
- (1784–1858) James Nelson Barker
- (1793–1876) John Neal
- (1806–1854) Robert Montgomery Bird
- (1810–1858) Robert Taylor Conrad
- (1819–1870) Anna Cora Mowatt
- (c. 1820–1890) Dion Boucicault
- (1823–1890) George H. Boker
- (1830–1876) George Aiken
- (1837–1920) William Dean Howells
- (1838–1899) Augustin Daly
- (1839–1901) James A. Herne
- (1840–1908) Abraham Haim Lipke Goldfaden
- (1842–1894) Steele MacKaye
- (1842–1908) Bronson Howard
- (1843–1916) Henry James
- (1845–1911) Edward Harrigan
- (1853–1909) Jacob Gordin
- (1853–1931) David Belasco
- (1855–1937) William Gillette
- (1856–1932 or later) Cora Scott Pond Pope
- (1856–1938) Eva Allen Alberti
- (1862–1935) Langdon Mitchell
- (1865–1909) Clyde Fitch
- (1866–1935) George Pierce Baker
- (1866–1944) George Ade
- (1867–1937) Frances Nimmo Greene
- (1869–1910) William Vaughn Moody
- (1872–1949) Mary Lewis Langworthy
- (1874–1938) Zona Gale
- (1874–1956) Owen Davis
- (1874–1965) W. Somerset Maugham
- (1875–1956) Percy MacKaye
- (1876–1948) Susan Glaspell
- (1876–1962) Jules Eckert Goodman
- (1878–1942) George M. Cohan
- (1878–1952) Ferenc Molnár
- (1878–1958) Rachel Crothers
- (1880–1948) Peretz Hirschbein
- (1880–1957) Sholem Asch
- (1881–1972) Padraic Colum
- (1882–1928) Avery Hopwood
- (1882–1961) Leonhard Frank
- (1883–1967) Martin Flavin
- (1885–1940) DuBose Heyward
- (1885–1942) William Alexander Percy
- (1886–1958) Zoë Akins
- (1887–1961) George S. Kaufman
- (1887–1962) Robinson Jeffers
- (1887–1968) Edna Ferber
- (1887–1974) George Kelly
- (1887–1995) George Abbott
- (1888–1953) Eugene O'Neill
- (1888–1959) Maxwell Anderson
- (1888–1962) H. Leivick
- (1888–1965) T. S. Eliot
- (1889–1946) John Colton
- (1889–1954) John L. Balderston
- (1889–1968) Howard Lindsay
- (1890–1980) Marc Connelly
- (1890–1984) Frances Goodrich
- (1891–1939) Sidney Howard
- (1891–1957) Philip Dunning
- (1891–1966) Anne Nichols
- (1892–1950) Edna St. Vincent Millay
- (1892–1966) Elmer Greensfelder
- (1892–1982) Archibald MacLeish
- (1893–1966) Russel Crouse
- (1893–1973) S. N. Behrman
- (1894–1962) E. E. Cummings
- (1894–1964) Ben Hecht
- (1894–1977) John Howard Lawson
- (1894–1981) Paul Green
- (1895–1943) Lorenz Hart
- (1895–1952) Alfred Neumann
- (1895–1956) Charles MacArthur
- (1895–1960) Oscar Hammerstein, II
- (1895–1966) Joseph Fields
- (1896–1949) Philip Barry
- (1896–1960) Edwin Justus Mayer
- (1896–1974) Lawrence Riley
- (1897–1958) F. Hugh Herbert
- (1897–1975) Thornton Wilder
- (1899–1967) Edgar Neville
- (1899–1980) Elliott Nugent
- (1900–1998) Julien Green
- (1901–1969) Jack Kirkland
- (1901–1984) Denis Johnston
- (1901–1988) Paul Osborn
- (1902–1967) Langston Hughes
- (1902–1967) Joseph Kesselring
- (1903–1987) Clare Boothe
- (1904–1961) Moss Hart
- (1904–1986) Christopher Isherwood
- (1905–1964) Marc Blitzstein
- (1905–1984) Lillian Hellman
- (1906–1963) Clifford Odets
- (1906–1995) Sidney Kingsley
- (1907–1973) W. H. Auden
- (1907–1981) Mary Coyle Chase
- (1908–1981) William Saroyan
- (1909–1981) Ketti Frings
- (1909–1984) Norman Krasna
- (1910–1961) Antanas Škėma
- (1911–1983) Tennessee Williams
- (1911–2004) Jerome Chodorov
- (1911–2007) Gian Carlo Menotti
- (1912–1998) Félix Morisseau-Leroy
- (1912–1999) Garson Kanin
- (1913–1973) William Inge
- (1913–2000) N. Richard Nash
- (1914–2008) William Gibson
- (1915–2005) Arthur Miller
- (1875–1952) Nellie Burget Miller
- (1914–1956) John La Touche
- (1917–1970) William Archibald
- (1917–1967) Carson McCullers
- (1917–2009) Robert Anderson
- (1918–1993) Louis O. Coxe
- (1918–2011) Arthur Laurents
- (1919–1949) Thomas Heggen
- (1922–1999) William Alfred
- (1922–2003) George Axelrod
- (1922–2006) Jay Presson Allen
- (1922–2008) Tad Mosel
- (1923–1981) Paddy Chayefsky
- (1923–1995) Michael V. Gazzo
- (1924–1987) James Baldwin
- (1925–1995) Charles Gordone
- (1925–2015) Frank D. Gilroy
- (1927–1998) James Goldman
- (1927–2018) Neil Simon
- (1928–2016) Edward Albee
- (1928–2019) George Herman
- (1929–2025) Jules Feiffer
- (1930–1965) Lorraine Hansberry
- (1930–2020) Bruce Jay Friedman
- (1932–2003) Jack Gelber
- (1934–2014) Imamu Amiri Baraka (LeRoi Jones)
- (1935–2020) Mart Crowley
- (1937–2021) Arthur Kopit
- (1937–2023) Tina Howe
- (born 1938) John Guare
- (born 1938) Elizabeth Forsythe Hailey
- (1938–2017) Janusz Głowacki
- (1939–2020) Israel Horovitz
- (1939–2020) Terrence McNally
- (born 1940) Janet Noble
- (1943–1987) Charles Ludlam
- (1943–2017) Sam Shepard
- (born 1945) Mac Wellman
- (born 1947) David Mamet
- (1949–2024) Christopher Durang
- (born 1953) Milcha Sanchez-Scott
- (born 1956) Tony Kushner
- (born 1958) Jane Shepard
- (born 1961) C. J. Hopkins
- (born 1961) Jon Robin Baitz
- (born 1962) Michael Hollinger
- (born 1962) Kenneth Lonergan
- (born 1965) Tracy Letts
- (born 1965) Laura Pedersen
- (born 1965) Peter Sagal

=== Puerto Rico ===
See also: List of Puerto Rican writers

- (1783–1873) María Bibiana Benítez
- (1876–1944) Luis Lloréns Torres
- (1919–1979) René Marqués
- (born 1936) Luis Rafael Sánchez
- (1944–2004) Pedro Pietri
- (1946–1988) Miguel Piñero
- (born 1955) José Rivera
