= List of Azerbaijani writers =

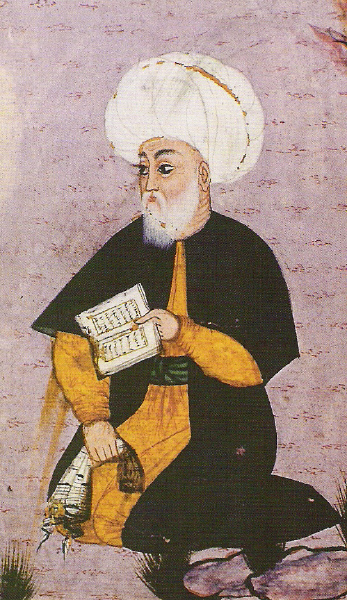
Fuzuli is considered one of the greatest contributors to the dîvân tradition of Azerbaijani literature.

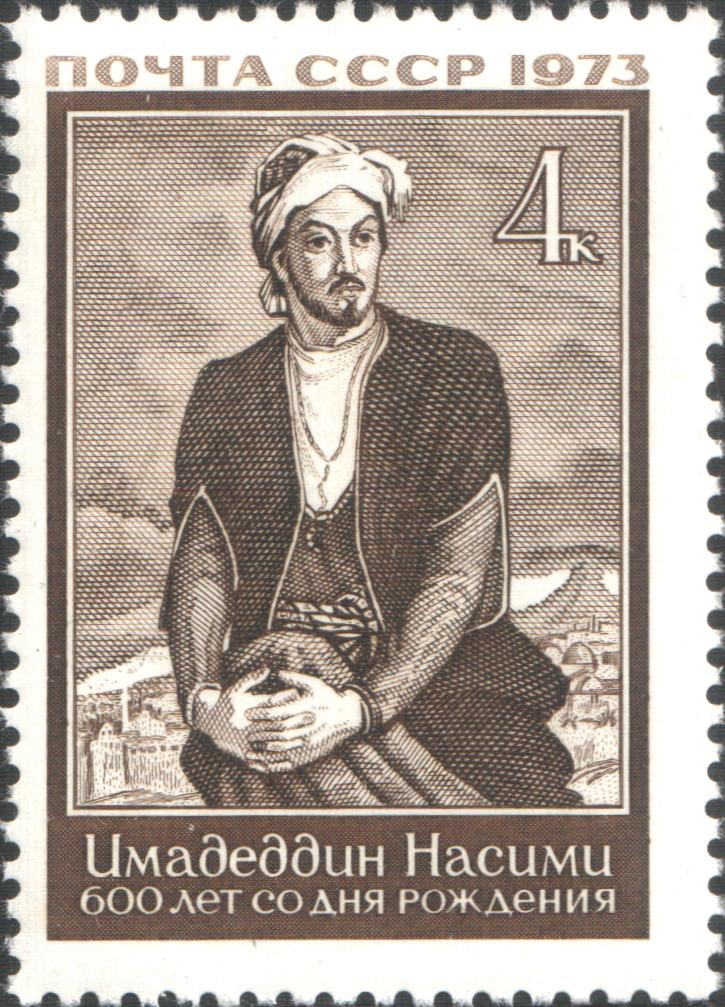
Imadaddin Nasimi is considered one of the greatest Azerbaijani mystical poets and one of the most prominent early dîvân masters in Azerbaijani literary history.

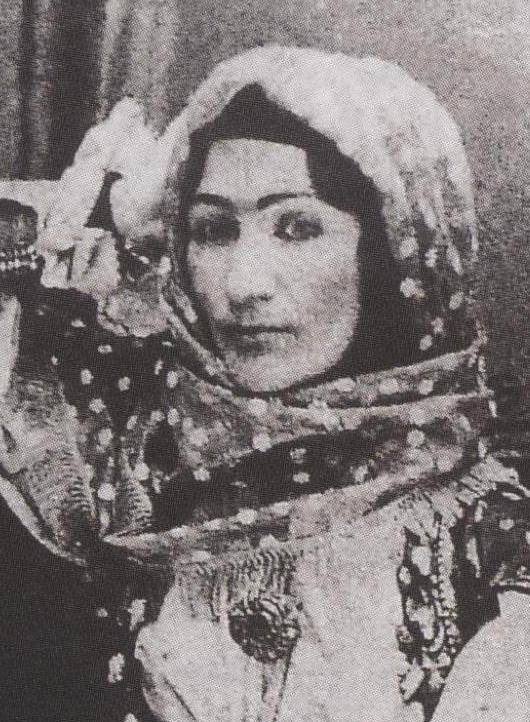
Khurshidbanu Natavan is considered one of the most important lyrical poets of Azerbaijan.

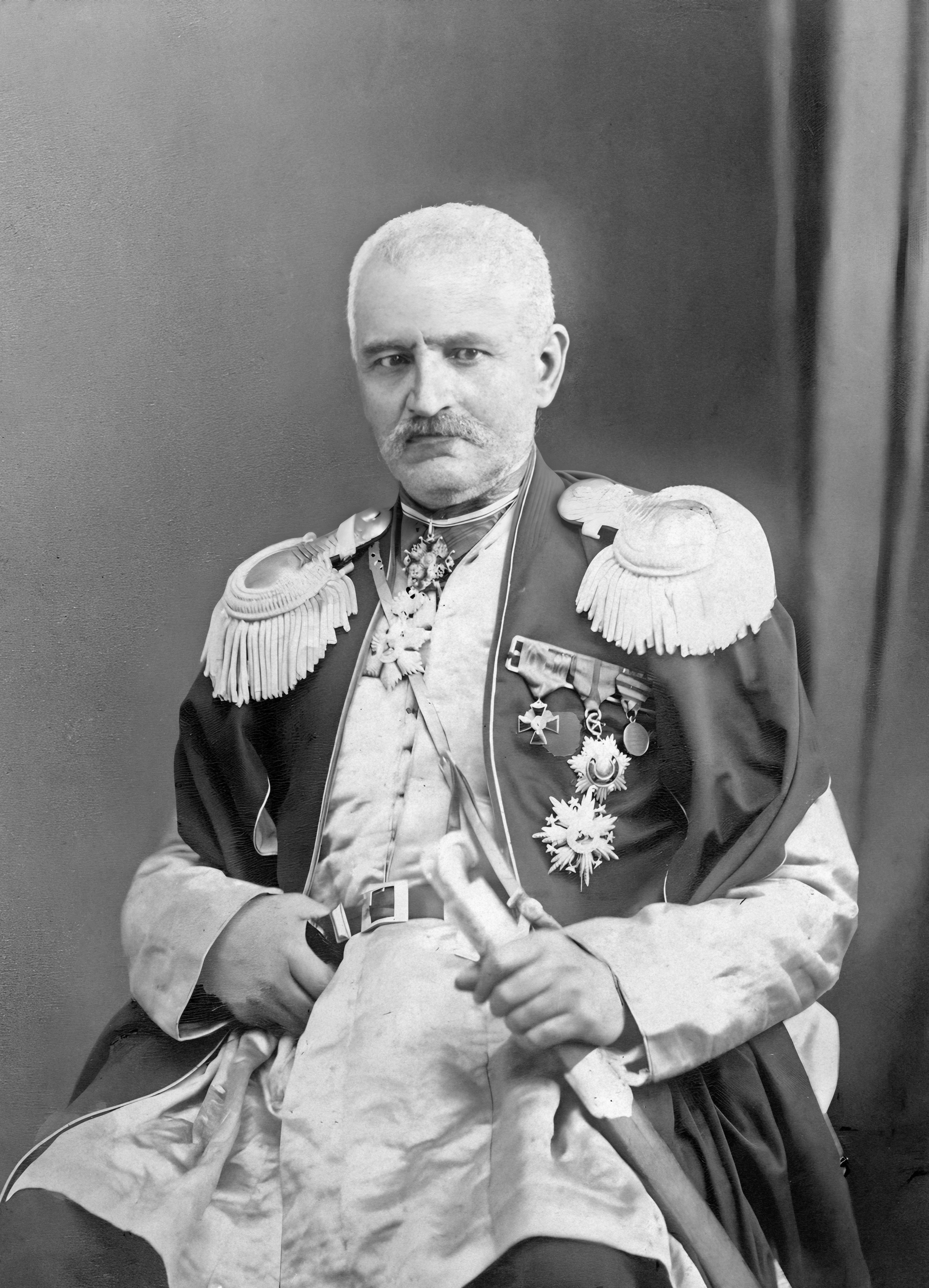
Mirza Fatali Akhundov is considered the founder of modern Azerbaijani literature.

This is a list of notable Azerbaijani writers.

== A ==
- Chingiz Abdullayev
- Ilyas Afandiyev
- Mirza Fatali Akhundov
- Suleyman Sani Akhundov
- Ashig Alasgar
- Abdulkerim Alizada

== B ==
- Vidadi Babanli
- Abbasgulu Bakikhanov
- Banine
- Hafiz Baxish
- Karamat Boyukchol

== C ==
- Yusif Vazir Chamanzaminli

== E ==
- Elchin Efendiyev

== F ==
- Fazli
- Fuzuli

== G ==
- Ali Gafarov

== H ==
- Habibi
- Hidayat
- Mehdi Huseyn

== I ==
- Mirza Ibrahimov
- Agalar Idrisoglu
- Hamlet Isakhanli

== J ==
- Jafar Jabbarly
- Huseyn Javid
- Ahmad Javad

== K ==
- Ali Karim
- Firidun bey Kocharli
- Kishvari

== M ==
- Afag Masud
- Nushaba Mammadli
- Mikayil Mushfig
- Mirza Ali Khan La'li

== N ==
- Nariman Narimanov
- Imadaddin Nasimi
- Khurshidbanu Natavan
- Mir Mohsun Navvab
- Sevinj Nurugizi
- Davud Nasib
- Kamran Nazirli

== O ==
- Mammed Said Ordubadi

== P ==
- Mir Jalal Pashayev

== R ==
- Nigar Rafibeyli
- Natig Rasulzadeh
- Suleyman Rustam
- Rasul Rza
- Anar Rzayev

== S ==
- Mirza Alakbar Sabir
- Abbas Sahhat
- Abdulla Shaig
- Seyid Azim Shirvani
- Ismayil Shykhly
- Manaf Suleymanov

== V ==
- Molla Panah Vagif
- Bakhtiyar Vahabzadeh
- Aliagha Vahid
- Suleyman Valiyev
- Mirza Shafi Vazeh
- Hashim bey Vazirov
- Najaf bey Vazirov
- Molla Vali Vidadi
- Samad Vurgun

== Y ==
- Yusuf Meddah

== Z ==
- Hikmet Ziya

== See also ==
- Lists of writers
- List of Azerbaijanis
