= List of Azerbaijani dramatists and playwrights =

This is a list of notable Azerbaijani dramatists and playwrights, which is arranged alphabetically.

== A ==
- Suleyman Sani Akhundov
- Sakina Akhundzadeh
- Hamid Arzulu

== B ==
- Vidadi Babanli

== H ==
- Abdurrahim bey Hagverdiyev

== I ==
- Magsud Ibrahimbeyov
- Mirza Ibrahimov

== J ==
- Jafar Jabbarly
- Huseyn Javid

== M ==
- Afag Masud

== O ==
- Mammed Said Ordubadi

== R ==
- Nigar Rafibeyli
- Natig Rasulzadeh
- Suleyman Reshidi
- Rasul Rza
- Anar Rzayev

== S ==
- Abbas Sahhat
- Huseyngulu Sarabski

== V ==
- Najaf bey Vazirov

== See also ==
- List of playwrights
- List of playwrights by nationality and year of birth
