= Afag =

Afag (Azerbaijani: Afaq, lit. 'Horizon') is a feminine given name and nickname of Azerbaijani origin. People with this name include:

- Afag Bashirgyzy (born 1955), Azerbaijani actress
- Afag Malikova (born 1947), Azerbaijani dancer
- Afag Masud (born 1957), Azerbaijani writer
