= Het Vrije Volk =

Dutch newspaper

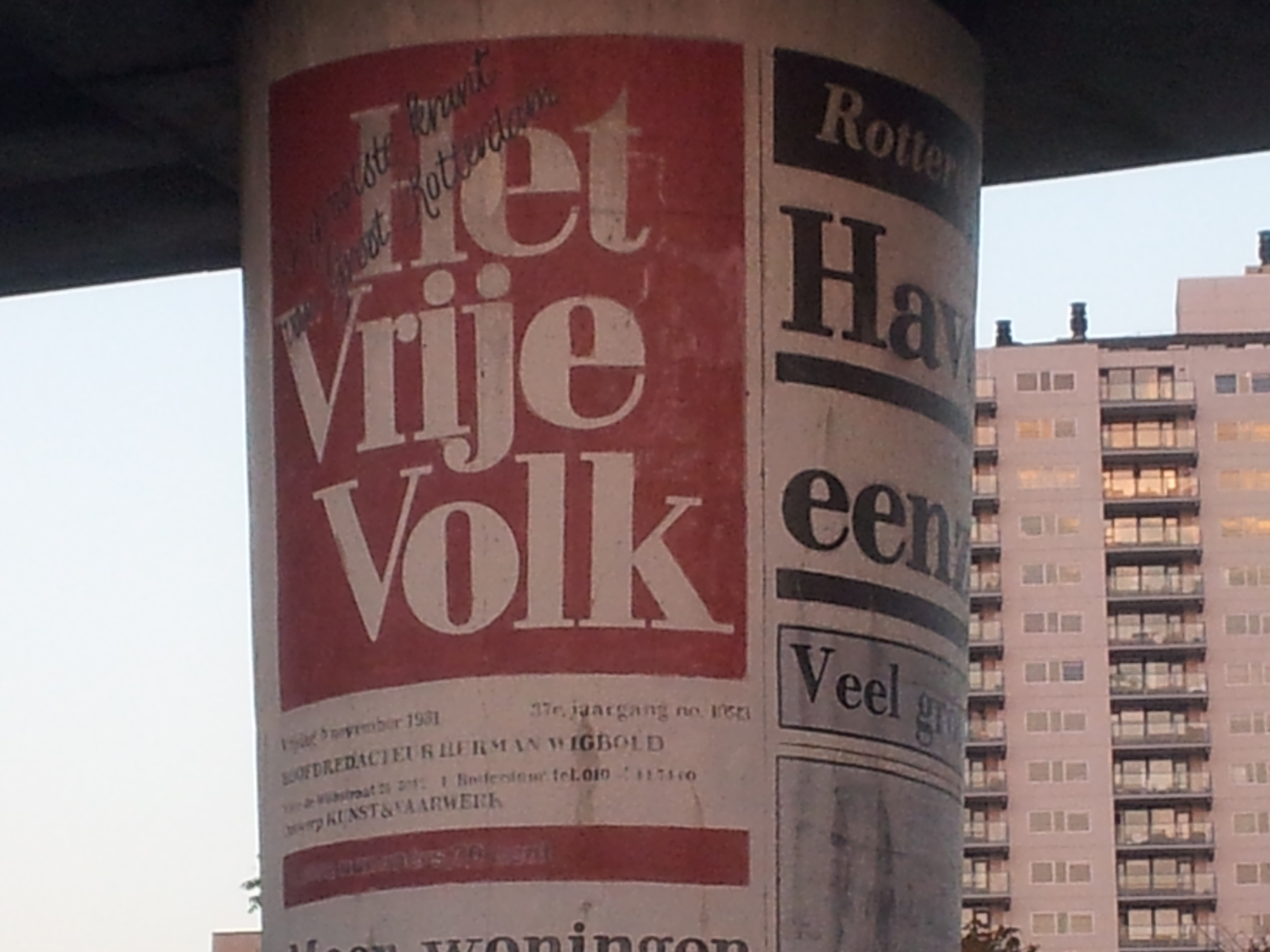
Front page of Het Vrije Volk on a pillar near a metro station in Rotterdam

Het Volk, later Het Vrije Volk (lit. 'The Free People'), was a Dutch socialdemocratic daily newspaper that existed from 1900 to 1991. In 1991, it merged with the Rotterdams Nieuwsblad, under the new title Rotterdams Dagblad, which later merged with the Algemeen Dagblad. The last issue of Het Vrije Volk was published on 30 March 1991.

== History ==
=== Het Volk ===
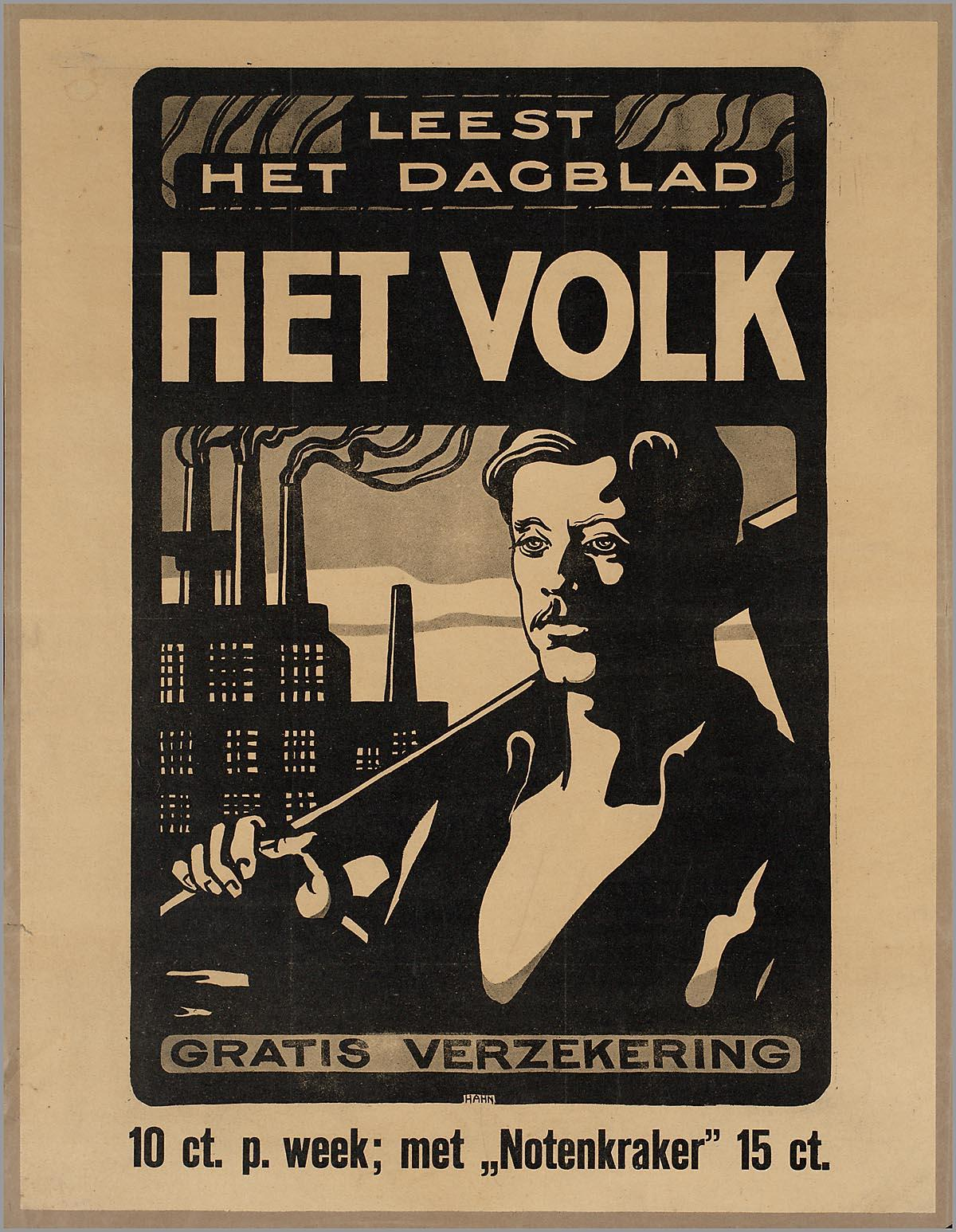
Advertisement from 1910-1918; by Albert Hahn

Het Volk was published in Amsterdam, beginning on 2 April 1900, by the Social Democratic Workers' Party (SDAP). Preparations for publishing Het Volk began in 1899. Financial support was provided by the older Social Democratic Party of Germany. A publishing company was established under the name De Arbeiderspers. Its first Editor-in Chief was the head of the SDAP, Pieter Jelles Troelstra. In 1903, after some disagreements arose, he was replaced by the journalist, Pieter Lodewijk Tak.

In 1902, a contest was held to find an artist for the front-page cartoon in the weekly Sunday supplement. The winner was Albert Hahn, who was later signed to a permanent contract. Among the others who contributed regularly were Fritz Behrendt (also a cartoonist), Jan Liber (a sportswriter) and the playwright Inte Onsman (under the pseudonym "Leckie Down"). In 1931, the paper moved into a new building, designed by Jan Buijs, which came to be known as the "Red Castle". A sister edition called Vooruit (Forward), was published in The Hague under the direction of Simon Carmiggelt.

After the German invasion in 1940, the paper's management vainly attempted to maintain some degree of independence. On 20 July 1940, Meinoud Rost van Tonningen of the National Socialist Movement began to oversee its operations.

=== Het Vrije Volk ===
After the war, the newspaper was re-established under a new name: Het Vrije Volk. Het Vrije Volk (The Free People) was first legally published on 1 March 1945, in Eindhoven. As the liberation of the Netherlands progressed, more editions began appearing starting in April 1945. After Eindhoven, there "liberated" editions were published in Enschede (starting early April 1945), Groningen (mid-April), Leeuwarden (early May), Amsterdam (5 May), and Utrecht (May 1945). Het Vrije Volk continued to be published in these editions until 28 January 1946, when all titles were consolidated in Amsterdam under a single editorial board and management. At that point, a national system with regional editions was introduced.

Under the social-democratic publishing group De Arbeiderspers, Het Vrije Volk was around 1956 the newspaper with the largest circulation (300,000 copies). At this peak, the newspaper employed more than 300 editors and reporters. After the fall of the Drees III Cabinet, however, its subscriber base rapidly declined. Efforts to save the (evening) paper, such as by launching a general morning edition in 1960, and severing formal ties with the Labour Party (PvdA) in 1967 ultimately failed.

Due to changes in ownership, the paper ceased to be a national publication based in the capital in 1970. The editorial offices retreated to former "red" strongholds in Rotterdam and Arnhem, where De Arbeiderspers still had its own printing facilities. The Amsterdam offices at Hekelveld were demolished and replaced by a hotel. A year later, one of the last remaining independent editions in the national system, Het Vrije Volk of Arnhem, was sold to a Catholic competitor in the east, De Gelderlander. This acquisition led to a short-lived merger under the name De Nieuwe Krant ("The New Newspaper"), humorously called the "red-and-Catholic HV Maria in-house". This title disappeared in the 1980s.

By the end of 1971, the remaining part of Het Vrije Volk had become a regional newspaper, focused on its home base of Rotterdam. The paper was struggling with a declining and rapidly aging subscriber base. It was said that Het Vrije Volk wasn't canceled by its readers, but by their next of kin.

The final issue under the name Het Vrije Volk appeared on 30 March 1991. The paper merged with the Rotterdams Nieuwsblad to form the Rotterdams Dagblad. In 2005, the Rotterdams Dagblad paper was absorbed into the Algemeen Dagblad.

== Chief editors ==
Pieter Jelles Troelstra	1901–1903
Pieter Lodewijk Tak	1903–1907
Johan Frederik Ankersmit	1925–1937
Klaas Voskuil	1945–1961
Thijs van Veen	1961–1968
Eduard Messer	1968–1970
Herman Wigbold	1970–1987
Gerard Krul	1987–1990
Leo Pronk	1990–1991
