= Suleyman Reshidi =

Azerbaijani dramatist (1927–2003)

Suleyman Reshidi Süleyman Rəşidi
- Born: Süleyman Həsən oğlu Əliyev; 27 May 1927; Nakhchivan, Azerbaijan SSR
- Died: 21 February 2003 (aged 75); Baku, Azerbaijan
- Citizenship: Soviet Union; Azerbaijan
- Education: Azerbaijan Polytechnical Institute
- Occupation: dramatist

Suleyman Reshidi (Azerbaijani: Süleyman Rəşidi; born Süleyman Həsən oğlu Əliyev; 25 May 1927 – 21 February 2003) was an Azerbaijani dramatist.

== Early life and education ==
Suleyman Reshidi was born on 25 May 1927, in the city of Nakhchivan. He moved to Baku in 1951 to continue his education, and in the same year he entered the Azerbaijan Polytechnical Institute. He graduated from the institute in 1956 and successfully worked as an engineer for many years.

== Career ==
Reshidi's creative work was a big part of his life. Putting his writing activity parallel to engineering he successfully managed to combine the two very different professions. Because of that, Reshidi was known as the engineer-dramatist in art circles.

=== Theatre plays ===
- The Son of Two Mothers (İki ananın bir oğlu, 1960)
- I'm Searching for Her (Mən onu axtarıram)
- The Living Statue (Canlı heykəl, 1978)
- The Guest
- A Pen
- Arzu Fulfilled His Wish
- The Power of Youth
- The Present
- Evil to Goodness
- Second Lieutenant
- May Peace Be Upon Them All (Allah onlara rəhmət eləsin, 1992)
- My Ardabil (Mənim Ərdəbilim, 1995)

== See also ==
- List of Azerbaijani writers
- List of playwrights
