= Pieter Lodewijk Tak =

Dutch journalist and politician

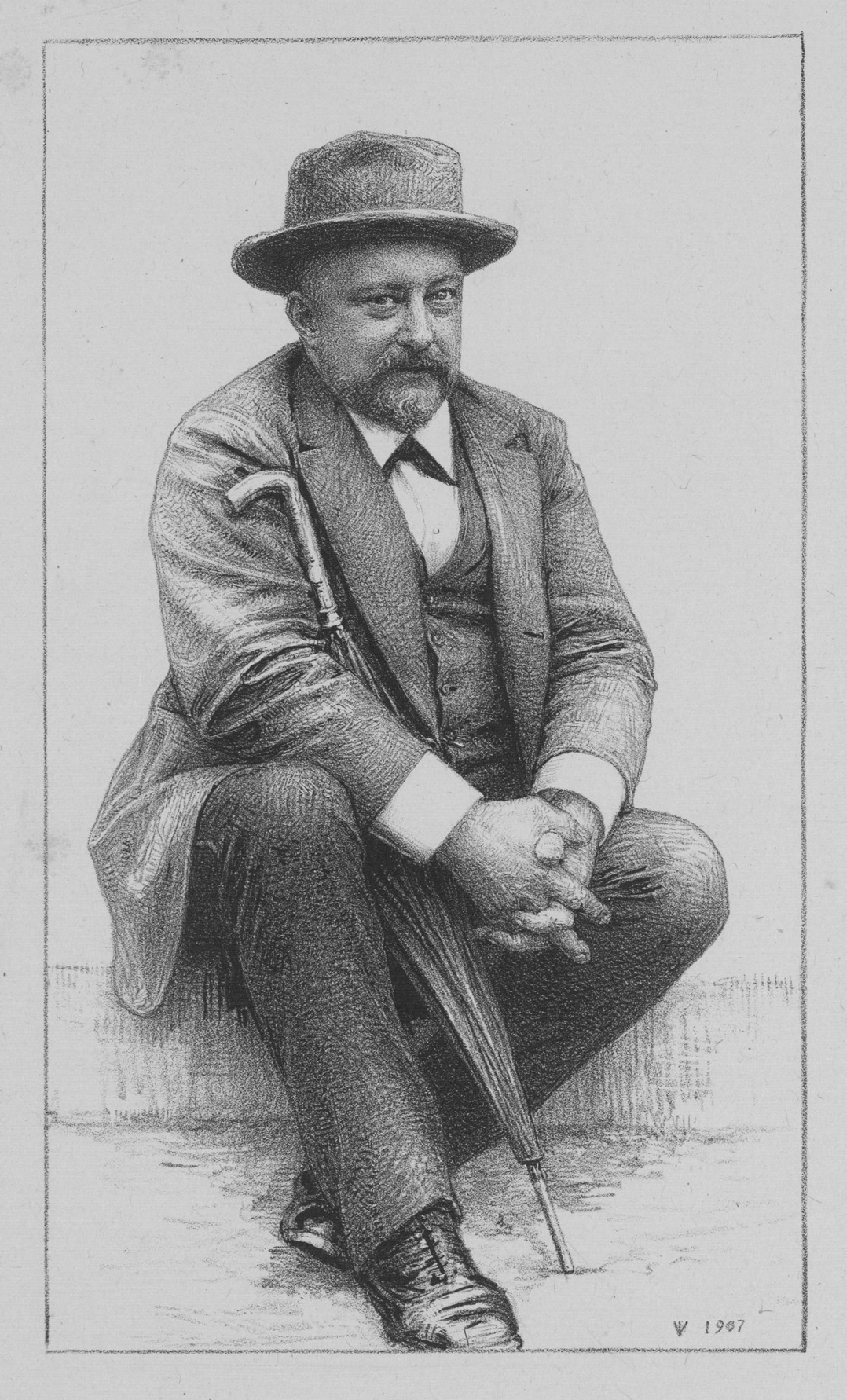
Pieter Lodewijk Tak, by Jan Veth

Pieter Lodewijk Tak (Middelburg, 24 September 1848 – Domburg, 26 August 1907) was a Dutch journalist and politician.

Tak was the son of a steward in Middelburg, where, after failing law school in 1878, he started writing foreign reviews for the Middelburgsche Courant. He was friends with Floor Wibaut, who like him was a member of the Sociëteit Sint-Joris. Both Middelburgers moved to Amsterdam, Tak in 1882. There he wrote for De Groene Amsterdammer and De Nieuwe Gids. He took over the financial management of the latter from Frank van der Goes, but left in 1895 to create an own magazine, De Kroniek.

Tak was initially left-liberal, supporter of Treub. In 1899 he became a member of the Social Democratic Workers' Party ("Sociaal-Democratische Arbeiderspartij" / SDAP), and started working for Het Volk. He became editor-in-chief of the socialist party newspaper in 1903, after the party board had removed Pieter Jelles Troelstra from this position. In 1905 Tak fired the journalist Jacob Israël de Haan after the publication of his novel Pijpelijntjes. The homosexual tendency in the book was not acceptable to Tak. He did, however, advocate women's rights. From 1905 until his early death he was also party leader, member of parliament for the constituency of Franeker, member of the Provincial Council and member of the city council of Amsterdam.

P.L. Tak founded the housing association De Dageraad (The Dawn Council) in 1901. This corporation named a complex of houses in Amsterdam-Zuid in the 1920s after its founder.

He died of heart failure, in 1907 during a holiday on the Duinvliet estate near Domburg.

== Literature ==
- Gilles W. Borrie: Pieter Lodewijk Tak (1848-1907), Journalist en politicus. Een gentleman in een rode broek. Aksant, Amsterdam, 2006
