= Apollo Korzeniowski =

Polish poet, playwright, translator and political activist

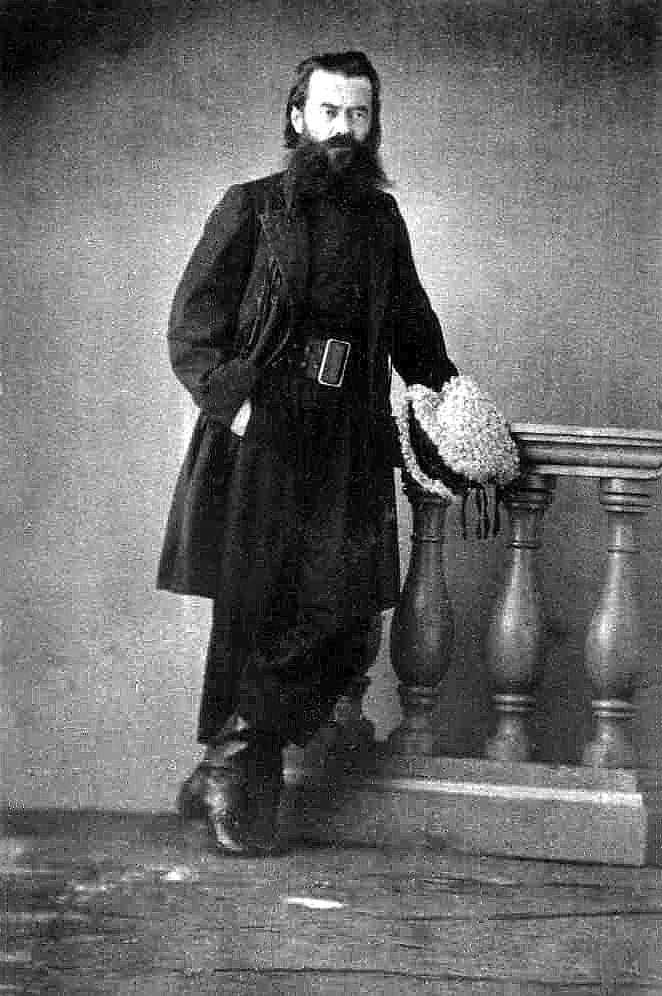
- Apollo Korzeniowski
- Born: 21 February 1820; Honoratka, Russian Empire (present-day Vinnytsia Oblast, Ukraine)
- Died: 23 May 1869 (aged 49); Kraków, Austrian Poland
- Occupations: Poet, playwright, clandestine political activist
- Spouse: Ewa Bobrowska (m. 1856; died 1865)
- Children: Joseph Conrad

Apollo Korzeniowski (21 February 1820 – 23 May 1869) was a Polish poet, playwright, translator, clandestine political activist, and father of Polish-British novelist Joseph Conrad.

== Life ==
Apollo Korzeniowski was born on 21 February 1820 in the Imperial Russian village of Honoratka, then in Lypovets Uyezd, Kiev Governorate, now Vinnytsia Oblast, Ukraine. He was the son of Teodor Korzeniowski, an 1831 Polish Army captain, an impoverished nobleman who made a living running leaseholds, and Julia née Dyakiewicz.

After graduating from secondary school in Zhytomyr, Apollo studied law and Oriental studies at the University of St. Petersburg, then returned to Ukraine, where in 1852 he became an estate manager in the Podole village of Łuczyniec.

In 1854, during the Crimean War, Apollo took an active part in preparations to organize in Ukraine—in the rears of the Russian armies fighting in Crimea—a Polish uprising. It came to nought due to British and French reluctance to get involved in the Polish cause.

In April 1856, Apollo married Ewa Bobrowska, sister of Tadeusz Bobrowski and Stefan Bobrowski. Together with his mother-in-law, Apollo leased the village of Derebczynka. On 3 December 1857 the Korzeniowskis welcomed into the world their only child, Józef Teodor Konrad Korzeniowski—who would be referred to by Polish family and friends as Konrad—the future English-language novelist, Joseph Conrad.

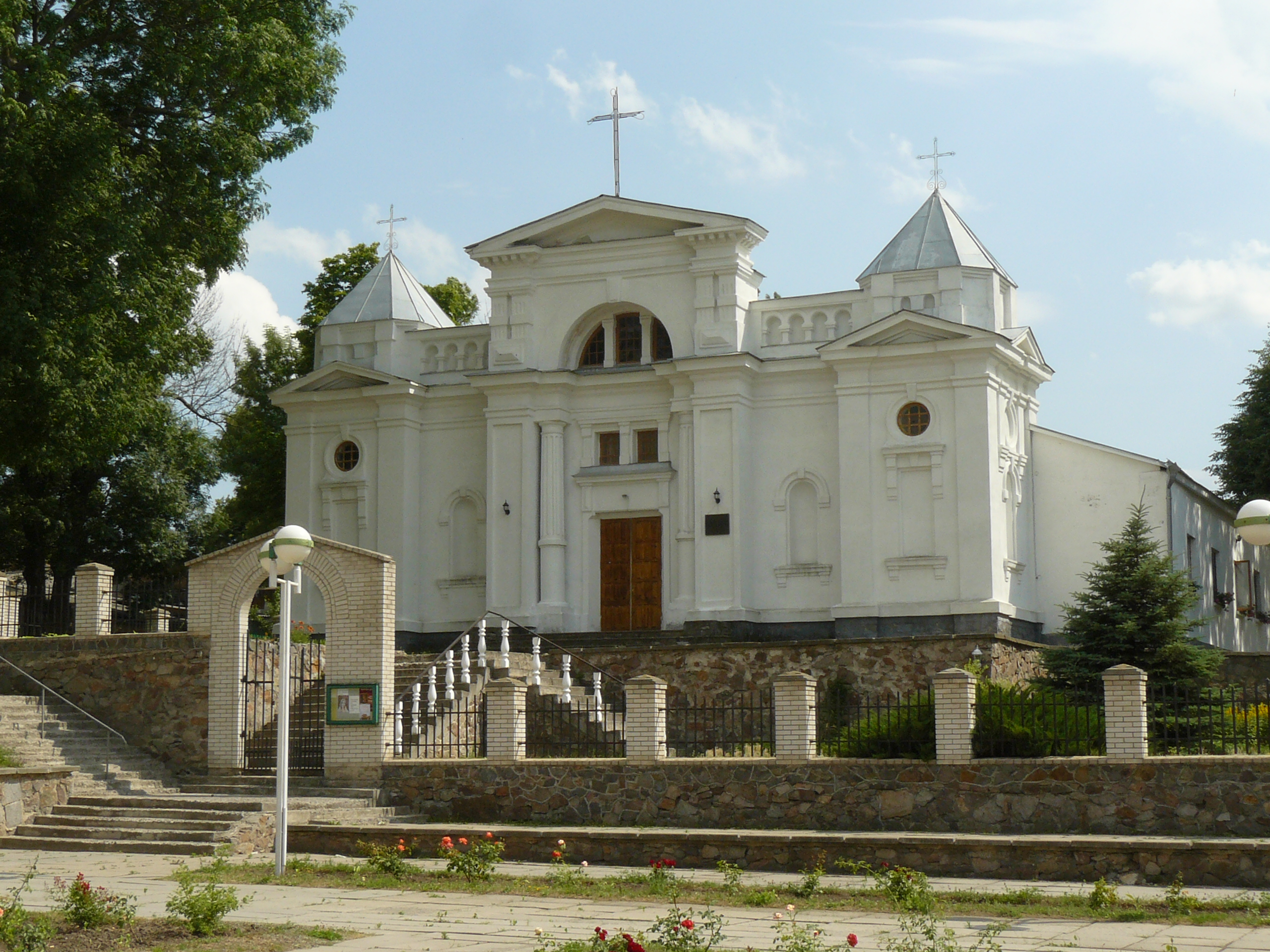
Church of St. Stanisław, in Orativ, Ukraine, where Apollo Korzeniowski married Ewa Bobrowska

In early 1859, after losing all their fortune on the leasehold, the Korzeniowskis moved permanently to Zhytomyr, where Apollo for a time served as secretary of a bookselling and publishing association and became a member of the board of directors of a Polish theatre.

It was Apollo Korzeniowski's years at Łuczyniec, Derebczynka, and Zhytomyr that saw the greatest flowering of his literary creativity. His first substantial work was a manuscript cycle of religious-patriotic poems, Purgatorial Songs (Czyśćcowe pieśni, 1849–54), which came into being under the clear—and none too fortunate—influence of Zygmunt Krasiński's poetry. Apollo overcame this influence only in the final poem of the cycle, "Forethunder" ("Przedgrom"), into which his earlier preparations for the unrealized uprising introduced revolutionary accents. These accents also appeared in a manuscript cycle of poems written in 1855 at the news of the Tsarist Army's bloody suppression of a peasant revolt in Skvira County.

In 1854 Korzeniowski wrote his chef d'oeuvre, the drama Komedia (Comedy), its beginning parts modeled after Aleksandr Griboyedov's comedy, Gorie ot uma (Woe from Wit). In Comedy, Korzeniowski severely criticized the Polish nobility in Ukraine and opposed it to two positive heroes—Henryk, a revolutionary-conspirator, and the Secretary, a cowed plebeian who, as the action develops, rebels against his employer. The play's 1855 publication (together with a lyric cycle, Stray Strophes—Strofy oderwane) became a social scandal. Comedy, severely treated by the critics, could gain a stage production.

In 1858 Korzeniowski published a second drama, For a Pretty Penny (Dla miłego grosza), which was to some extent a continuation of Comedy. The new play likewise contained criticism of the wealthy Polish nobility in Ukraine, which was passing over to new, capitalist methods of management; this time, however, the criticized milieu was contrasted only with an old nobleman-conservative who desperately clung to the feudal system.

Korzeniowski's Polish translation of Victor Hugo's drama Hernani, 1862

Apart from original work, Korzeniowski did translations, including Alfred de Vigny's 1835 drama Chatterton and several works by Victor Hugo: the dramas Hernani and Marion Delorme, and fragments of the poem collection, La Légende des siècles (The Legend of the Ages). He also wrote much correspondence to the Warsaw newspapers.

At the turn of the 1850s and 1860s, Korzeniowski once again engaged in sociopolitical activity. Thus, in April 1861 he took part, at Zhytomyr, in deliberations by delegates of the nobility from the three guberniyas comprising Rus Province—deliberations whose aim was the creation, with the help of the guberniya Agricultural Associations, of a common Polish organization for the Rus and Lithuanian provinces; Korzeniowski proposed then sending the Tsar a demand that these two provinces be joined administratively to Congress Poland.

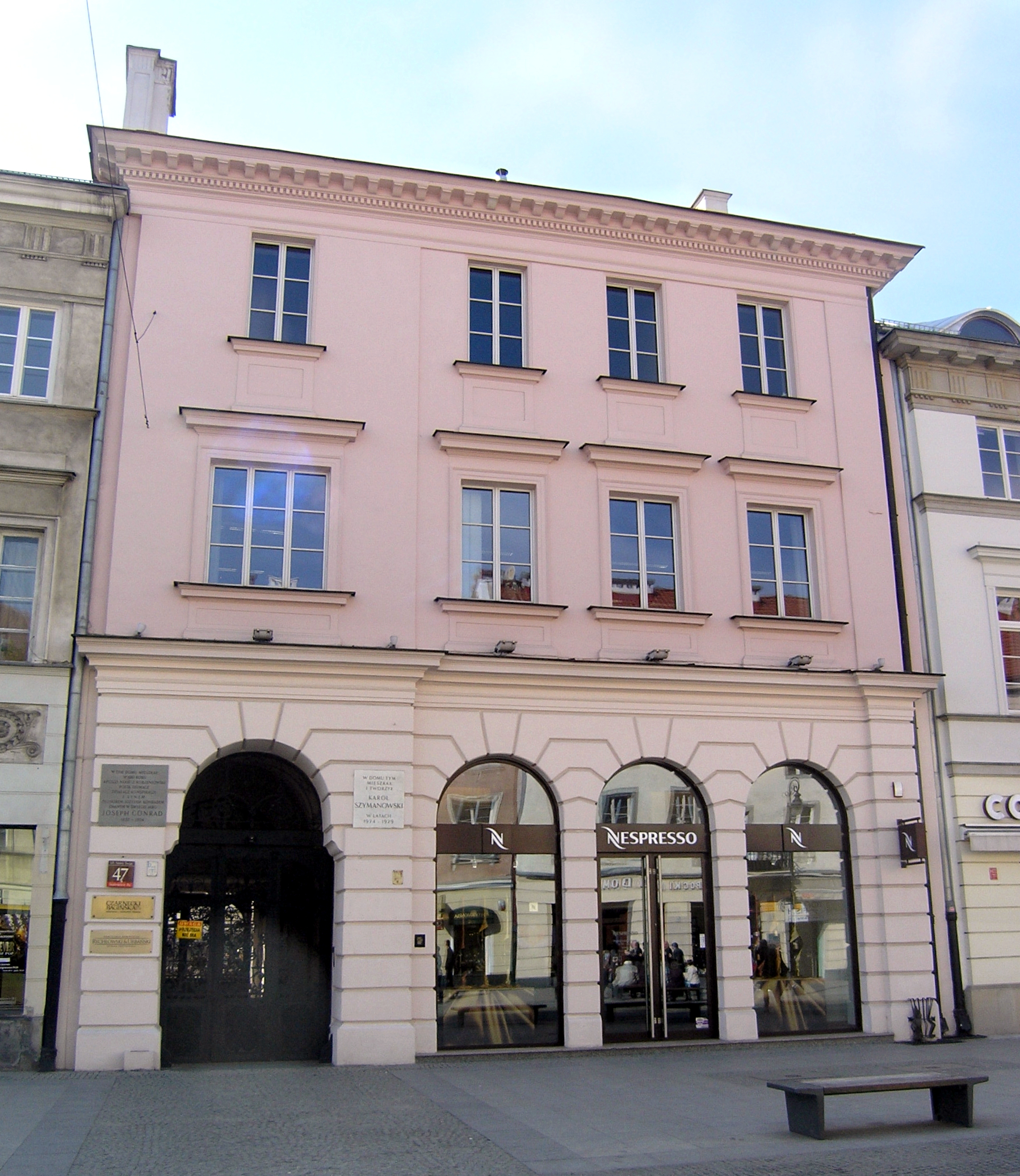
Nowy Świat 47, Warsaw, where Apollo Korzeniowski lived in 1861 with his wife and three-year-old son Konrad (the future novelist Joseph Conrad). In front is a "Chopin's Warsaw" bench.

In May 1861, hearing of a patriotic movement developing in Warsaw, Korzeniowski traveled from Zhytomyr to Warsaw. There he sought the right to publish a radical socio-literary Biweekly (Dwutygodnik). Initially he associated himself with K. Majewski, who would later name him in testimony as his deputy in a "triumvirate." Korzeniowski, however, distanced himself from Majewski due to the latter's contacts with the "Whites" and became close to more radical groups, especially to youth in the Warsaw Academy of Fine Arts (Akademia Sztuk Pięknych) and to the "Red" representative, Ignacy Chmieleński, who would become the chief of the National Government (Rząd Narodowy) during the January 1863 Uprising.

Korzeniowski became a leading organizer of political demonstrations. He helped organize celebrations of the anniversary of the Union of Lublin, was an organizer of a demonstration connected with the funeral of Archbishop A. Fijałkowski, and was the chief initiator of celebrations of the anniversary of the Union of Horodło. He also worked to organize a boycott of municipal elections that were scheduled to begin in Warsaw on 23 September 1861. When this effort failed and martial law was declared in Congress Poland, Korzeniowski was one of the chief initiators in forming (17 October 1861) a Municipal Committee (Komitet Miejski)—the supreme authority of the "Red" conspiracy.

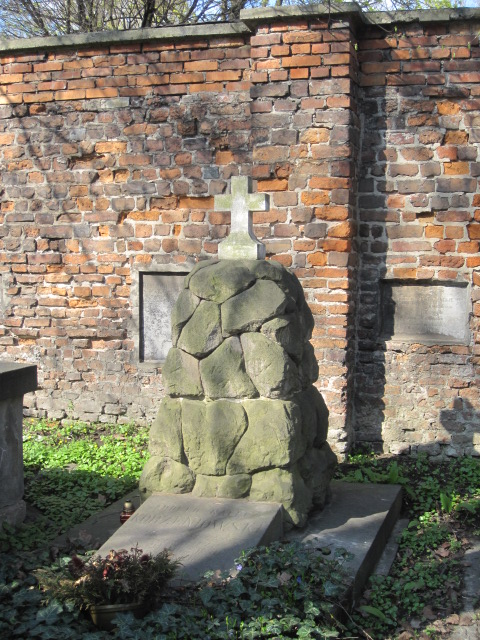
Korzeniowski's grave, Rakowicki Cemetery, Kraków

On the night of 20–21 October 1861, Korzeniowski was arrested and held in custody in the Tenth Pavilion of the Warsaw Citadel. In May 1862 he was sentenced by a court martial to exile in Vologda; a year later, this was commuted to Chernihiv.

In exile, Korzeniowski resumed his literary work. He produced a memoir on "Poland and Muscovy" ("Polska i Moskwa," published in a periodical in 1864); a fragment of a play, No Rescue (Bez ratunku); and a "Study of Drama in the Works of Shakespeare" ("Studia nad dramatycznością w utworach Szekspira"). He also translated Charles Dickens' Hard Times and Shakespeare's Comedy of Errors.

At Chernihiv, in 1865, Korzeniowski's wife Ewa died of tuberculosis. In late 1867, Korzeniowski himself, on account of his poor health (tuberculosis and heart disease), was released from exile and allowed to leave Russia. In early 1868 he went with his son Konrad to Lviv, in Austrian-occupied Poland. A year later they moved to Kraków, likewise in Austrian Poland, where Apollo could work with the recently founded democratic daily, Kraj (Homeland).

On 23 May 1869, Korzeniowski died in Kraków. He was interred in the Rakowicki Cemetery. Over his grave stands a monument designed by sculptor Walery Gadomski.

== Legacy ==
Apollo Korzeniowski was remembered merely as the father of English-language novelist Joseph Conrad. Only with the world premiere of Apollo's Comedy in Wrocław in 1952, nearly a century after its 1854 composition, was attention brought to Apollo Korzeniowski as an important literary personality and man of action in his own right.

About two weeks before his death, Korzeniowski supervised the burning of all the manuscripts of his own work that he had in his possession. His son recalled: "I happened to go into his room a little earlier than usual that evening, and remaining unnoticed, stayed to watch the nursing-sister feeding the blaze in the fire-place." However, a few manuscripts and a series of letters written before and during his exile to his most intimate friends survived in others' possession.

== See also ==
- List of Polish-language poets
- List of playwrights by nationality and date of birth

== Sources ==
- Taborski, Roman (1969), "Korzeniowski, Apollo", Polski słownik biograficzny, vol. XIV, Wrocław: Polska Akademia Nauk, pp. 167–69
