= List of British playwrights =

This is a list of British playwrights.

== 16th-century British playwrights ==
- Thomas Kyd
- Christopher Marlowe
- William Shakespeare

== 20th-century British playwrights ==
- Jim Allen
- John Arden
- Alan Ayckbourn
- John Roman Baker
- Howard Barker
- Peter Barnes
- J. M. Barrie
- Alan Bennett
- Tess Berry-Hart
- Stephen Beresford
- Robert Bolt
- Edward Bond
- John Griffith Bowen
- Howard Brenton
- Leo Butler
- John Caine
- George Calderon
- Caryl Churchill
- Noël Coward
- Martin Crimp
- Tim Crouch
- April De Angelis
- Keith Dewhurst
- Nell Dunn
- David Edgar
- Helen Edmundson
- Ben Elton
- Michael Frayn
- John Galsworthy
- Simon Gray
- David Greig
- Trevor Griffiths
- David Hare
- Walter Howard
- Catherine Johnson
- Terry Johnson
- Sarah Kane
- Sue Lenier
- Saunders Lewis
- Henry Livings
- Frederick Lonsdale
- Stephen Lowe
- David Mercer
- Deborah McAndrew
- Edgar Middleton
- Raman Mundair
- Peter Nichols
- Onyeka
- Joe Orton
- John Osborne
- Harold Pinter
- Alan Plater
- Alan Pollock
- J. B. Priestley
- Peter Quilter
- Terence Rattigan
- David Rudkin
- Willy Russell
- James Saunders
- Anthony Shaffer
- Peter Shaffer
- R. C. Sherriff
- Dodie Smith
- Gladys Bronwyn Stern
- Tom Stoppard
- David Storey
- Alfred Sutro
- Herbert Swears
- Miles Tredinnick
- Keith Waterhouse
- Timberlake Wertenbaker
- Arnold Wesker
- Emlyn Williams
- Snoo Wilson
- Charles Wood
- Lauri Wylie

== See also ==
- List of English playwrights
- List of Scottish playwrights
