= Agalar Idrisoglu =

Azerbaijani writer (born 1950)

Agalar Idrisoglu (Azerbaijani: Ağalar İdrisoğlu, born March 16, 1950) is an Azerbaijani writer, dramatist, stage director and publisher.

He was born in Digah, Masally, Azerbaijan SSR, USSR. He was a "Gizil Dervish" prize winner, Presidential scholar and Honored Artist of the Republic of Azerbaijan.
