= Digah, Masally =

Digah
- Municipality
- Location within Azerbaijan
- Coordinates: 39°03′N 48°39′E
- Country: Azerbaijan
- Rayon: Masally

Population
  - Total: 3,722
- Time zone: UTC+4 (AZT)
  - Summer (DST): UTC+5 (AZT)

Digah (also, Digyakh and Dygya) is a village and municipality in the Masally Rayon of Azerbaijan. It has a population of 3,722.
