= Afag Malikova =

Azerbaijani dancer

Afag Malikova Afaq Məlikova
- Born: January 18, 1947 (age 79); Baku, Azerbaijan SSR, USSR
- Occupation: Dancer
- Awards

Afag Suleyman gizi Malikova (Azerbaijani: Afaq Süleyman qızı Məlikova, Russian: Меликова, Афаг Сулейман кызы; born January 18, 1947) is a Soviet Azerbaijani dancer. She was awarded the Honored Artist of the Azerbaijan SSR (1975), and People's Artiste of the Azerbaijan SSR (1978).

== Biography ==
Afag Malikova was born on January 18, 1947, in Baku. In 1963–1974, she was a soloist of the Azerbaijan State Song and Dance Ensemble. Since 1974, she has been a soloist and coach pedagogue of the Azerbaijan State Dance Ensemble. Since 1982, she has been working as the artistic director of the State Dance Ensemble.

A. Malikova performed in a number of foreign countries (Turkey, Egypt, Poland, France, England, Canada, Portugal, Germany, Spain, etc.).

On April 11, 1975, she was awarded the honorary title of "Honored Artist of the Azerbaijan SSR", and on January 11, 1978, she was awarded the honorary title of "People's Artist of the Azerbaijan SSR". She was awarded the Azerbaijan Shohrat Order on December 28, 2001, and the Sharaf Order on May 16, 2017.
