= Davud Nasib =

Azerbaijani poet and translator

- Davud Məcid oğlu Nəsibov
- Born: 25 August 1942; Qazax, Azerbaijan SSR, USSR
- Died: 26 March 2003 (aged 60); Baku, Azerbaijan
- Education: Baku State University
- Occupations: Poet, translator
- Writing career
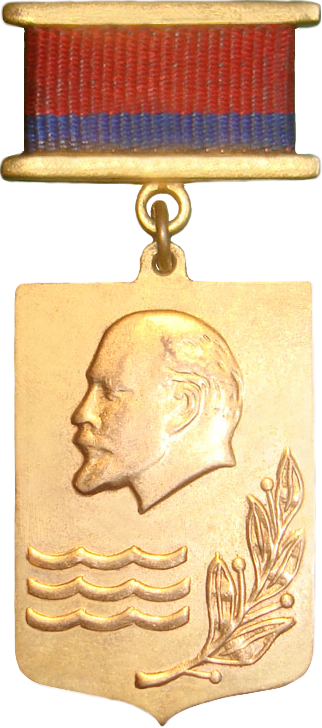
- Notable awards: Lenin Komsomol Prize; Lenin Komsomol Prize of the Azerbaijan SSR
- Website: davudnasib.az

Davud Majid ogly Nasibov (Azerbaijani: Davud Məcid oğlu Nəsibov) was an Azerbaijani poet, translator, member of the Union of Azerbaijani Writers since 1969, laureate of the Lenin Komsomol Prize of the Azerbaijan SSR (1984) and of the Lenin Komsomol Prize (1986).

== Biography ==
Davud Nasib was born in Qazax on 25 August 1942.

Nasib received his primary and secondary education in high school #2 of Qazax. He entered the Baku State University Librarian-information Faculty in 1959. His first work - a poem My Native River – My Kura (Azerbaijani: Mənim doğma çayım - Mənim Kür çayım) was published in 1956, in Victory Flag (Azerbaijani: Qalibiyyət bayrağı) newspaper in Qazax. Since then Nasib actively began writing poems.

He also made artistic translations of the poetry of the Soviet Union nations. Davud Nasib translated the poems of the Hungarian poet Miklós Radnóti into Azerbaijani. His books named Letters to Mother (Azerbaijani: Anama məktublar) and Furnace stones (Azerbaijani: Ocaq daşları) were released by the Moscow publishing house Sovetsky Pisatel respectively in 1974 and 1981.

In 1966–1969, Nasib worked as an editor in the Art Department of the State Committee for Television and Radio Broadcasting of the Azerbaijan SSR. Then he completed a two-year higher literature course at the Union of Soviet Writers in Moscow (1971–1972). After graduation, he returned to Baku, worked as a literary employee in the editorial office of the "Literature and Art" newspaper, head of the Fine Arts Department, and then headed the Poetry Department here. He was a member of the Presidium of the Union of Azerbaijani Writers. In 1978–1980, Nasib was on a creative vacation to the Hungarian People's Republic.

Davud Nasib died on March 26, 2003, in an automobile accident.

== Family ==
Davud Nasib was married, with two children named Khayal and Khayyam. His father was killed in the Great Patriotic War.

== Bibliography (selection) ==
1. Bir ömrün salnaməsi (Chronicle of a lifetime) // New Azerbaijan, 2001.
2. Sığındım (I took refuge) // Literary newspaper, 2012.
3. Ata (Father) // Literary newspaper, 2014.
