= Miodrag Novaković =

Serbian cineast (1940–2023)

- Born: 1940; Belgrade, Kingdom of Yugoslavia
- Died: 8 September 2023 (aged 82–83)
- Education: The Theatre, Film and Radio Academy, Belgrade (now Faculty of Dramatic Arts)
- Occupations: writer, director, screenwriter, critic, theorist, esthetist, pedagogue

Miodrag Miša Novaković (Serbian Cyrillic: Миодраг Миша Новаковић; 1940 – 8 September 2023) was a Serbian cineast, writer, cultural expert, film and television director, screenwriter, critic, theorist, esthetist, director of several important Yugoslav film festivals and film pedagogue.

== Biography ==
Novaković was the brother of the important cultural figure of SFR Yugoslavia, Slobodan Novaković. Miodrag finished primary and grammar school in Belgrade, where he was born. In 1967 he graduated from The Faculty of Law and in 1969 he graduated from The Theatre, Film and Radio Academy department for dramaturgy (now Faculty of dramatic arts), prof. Josip Kulundžić's class.

Novaković was the head of the Film center of Dom pionira (today: Dečji kulturni centar Beograd, Children's cultural center Belgrade), from 1970–1972. He initiated and was a selector of the Film parade — the international festival of films for children and the youth, from 1971 to 1972; head of the Yugoslav film festival in Pula and the executive of FEST in Belgrade from 1972 to 1974.

His short stories, essays and articles on film and the theatre were published in Politika, Student, Odjek, Kazalište, Jež, Beogradska nedelja, Borba, Sineast, Ekran, Književnost, Filmograf, YU film danas, Filmska kultura, Drama...

Novaković was the author of the books Fini ljudi (Nice people, published by Zadruga pisaca, 1967), Kako zalazi sunce (As the sun sets, Zadruga pisaca, 1970), Gledanje u film (Watching in the film, published by YU film danas, 2000) and, with Gordana Zindović-Vukadinović, co-author of Pars pro toto, medijska pismenost za nastavnike osnovnih škola (Pars proto, media literacy for elementary school teachers, published by Centar za audiovizuelne medije – Medija fokus, 2001). His works are included in the anthology Jugoslovenska filmska misao 1920–1995 (Yugoslav film thought 1920–1995) edited by Several Franić.

Novaković made short films Beograd na šoferšajbni (Belgrade on the windshield, the winner of the second prize at The first Yugoslav festival of the amateur films), Zima u Pragu (Winter in Prague; the winner of the third prize at the same festival), Oni dolaze (They are coming, on children who sing and play on the streets of Belgrade), Pijani brod (The Drunken ship), and the series of TV portraits: on academician Nikola Hajdin (TV Beograd), actor Raša Plaović (TV Beograd), film directors Žorž Skrigin (TV Beograd) and Žika Mitrović (TV Novi Sad), as well as film scriptwriter Ferenc Deak (TV Novi Sad).

For decades Novaković cooperated with children's film amateurs in Serbia and the former Yugoslavia. He took part in many discussions on film. He lectured on film dramaturgy to filmmakers, primary and secondary teachers, youths and children.

Novaković was awarded a great number of national (both Serbian and Yugoslav) as well as international recognitions.

Novaković was an expert on the life and work of Nikola Tesla, contributing through studies, essays, films and popularization. (Note: Special issue "Tesla na sceni, ekranu i u etru" ("Tesla on the scene, screen and in the air") of Novine beogradskog čitališta (Newspaper of the Belgrade Reading Room), Belgrade, No. 9-10-11, May–June–July 2006, whose Novaković was one of the editors, quotes: Dan kada se vratio Tesla (The day when Tesla came back, 1992), documentary video film (36 minutes), produced by IC "Sabornost" and executive producer Miloš Spajić, directed by Nikola Stojanović and written by Miodrag Miša Novaković .; Poetika Teslinog univerzuma (Poetics of Tesla's Universe, 1996), radio show in which Novakovic participated, Radio Novi Sad (5 minutes), Tesla u Budimpešti (Tesla in Budapest, 2002), documentary video film (10 minutes), produced by NGO "Teslino planetarno poselo" (Tesla worldwide gathering) and "Fix Focus" production from Belgrade, director and producer was Miroslav Bata Petrović, screenwriter and narrator Miodrag Miša Novaković.)

Miodrag Novaković died on 8 September 2023.
