= Kamran Nazirli =

Azerbaijani writer (born 1958)

- Born: 19 June 1958; Astara, Azerbaijan
- Occupations: Author, translator
- Writing career
- Genres: novel, story
- Notable works: The Light of Devil, The Fourth Seal
- Notable awards: Gold Word Prize for the translation book (2011), International Rasul Rza Prize for literature (2016)

Kamran Nazirli (born 19 June 1958) is an Azerbaijani writer, dramatist and translator. He is a member of the Azerbaijani and Belarus Writers' Union and Journalists' Union of Azerbaijan. He was awarded with the Prize of H.B. Zardabi, the founder of the Azerbaijani National Press, Rasul Rza Prize for literature.

== Life ==
Nazirli was born in Astara in 1958 and moved to Baku in 1975, where he studied in the English faculty at the Azerbaijani Institute of Foreign Languages. He received his PhD with a thesis in Linguistics. He also graduated from the Baku Institute of Social Management and Politics and worked as a correspondent in various newspapers and State Information Agencies (Azerinform) as a translator in various international companies and projects financed by the World Bank. He is a Member of the Azerbaijani Writers' Union and the author of several books such as Love Story, Among the Natives, The Devil's Light, Selected Stories, The White House, and A Man in Coma.

He received the "Gold Word" prize from the Azerbaijani Ministry of Culture and Tourism in 2011 for his translation of the book entitled Nobody Ever Dies and was awarded a special prize from the USA Embassy in Azerbaijan for his translation book Moby Dick by Herman Melville and international Prize named after Rasul Rza for literature.

Kamran Nazirli has translated works by English and American novelists and poets into Azeri such as Jack London, Oscar Wilde, William Faulkner, Ernest Hemingway, Margaret Mitchell, Edgar Allan Poe, John Galsworthy, Somerset Maugham, Harold Pinter, etc. He also translates works by Azerbaijani writers and poets into English.

== Works ==
- Love Story (Baku, 1991)
- Among The Natives (Baku, 1995)
- The Old Baby (Baku, 2002)
- The Devil"s Light (Baku, 2004)
- Araz- My Life (Baku, 2004)
- A Man in Coma (Baku, 2007)
- Selected Stories (Baku, 2010)
- The White House (Baku, 2011)
- Tokay and Manana (Baku, 2012)
- Society Is the Mirror of Policy (Baku, 1999)
- Tell Me A Tale, Grandma!(Baku, 2003)
- The Moments of Noble Man"s Life (Baku, 2005)
- The Patrimony. Stories. Plays. Baku. 2014. 432 p.
- "19+1". Stories. Play. İn Russian. Baku, 2014. 360 p.
- The Book about Sohrab Tahir, Baku, Mutarjim, 2015
- The Book about Rashad Mahmudov, Baku, Mutarjim, 2015
- The Fourth Seal, Novel. Baku, Mutarjim, 2015. 464 p.
- The Happy Birds, Short Stories. Baku, Mutarjim, 2018. 196 p.
- When the Gull Build Nests. Short stories, Mutarjim, Baku, 2018, 248 p.
- The Grandparents Don"t Say Fairytale, Short Stories. Baku, Mutarjim, 2018. 198 p.

=== Plays ===
- The Devil"Light, The play was staged by Lankaran State Theatre in 2011.
- The Drug-addict, The play was staged by Sumgait State Theatre in 2014

=== Translated Books ===
- Jack London, Novels and stories, Baku, 1987
- Nobody Ever Dies, Selection novels and stories of the World Literature, Baku, 2010
- Herman Melville, Moby Dick, Baku, 2011
- Oscar Wilde, Selected Works, Baku, 2012
- Novruz Najafoglu. Nijat, Tural and Humay: Stories. (Baku, 2013)
- Husseinbala Miralamov, Gates of Ganja, Historical novel with two parts, (Baku, 2013)
- Vaqif Bahmanli, Muslim (Baku, 2013)
- Mirafsal Tabib, Sonnets, Mutajim (Baku, 2012)
- Jabir Novruz, Selected poems, Mutajim (Baku, 2014)
- Candles (Anthology of the Azerbaijani poetry-101 verses of Azerbaijani poets), Baku, 2015, in English
- Punishment (novel by Azerbaijani writer H. Miralamov), Baku, 2015, in English
- Ales Karlyukevich. The adventures of Maksimka in homeland and other countries. Novel-story, Baku, Mutarjim, 2015. p. 116
- Svetlana Aleksievich. U voyni ne jenskoe licho. Novel on War. Baku, 2015
- Margaret Mitchell, Gone with the Wind, Novel, Baku, 2015
- Dawn. A Collection of poems. Gulu Aghsas. Contemporary Azerbaijani Poetry in English. Mutarjim Publishing House, 2016
- The Song of Spring. A Collection of poems. Nigar Rafibayli. Contemporary Azerbaijani Poetry in English. Mutarjim Publishing House, 2016
- The Unforgettable Letter. A Collection of poems. Baloglan Jalil. Contemporary Azerbaijani Poetry in English. Mutarjim Publishing House, 2016
- Nikolay Cherqinech. Sons. Novel, Baku, 2016
- You Love Me. A Collection of poems. Rashad Majid. Contemporary Azerbaijani Poetry in English. Mutarjim Publishing House, 2017
- A Light in the Darkness. A Collection of poems. Mehmet Nuri Parmaksiz Contemporary Turkish Poetry in English. Mutarjim Publishing House, Baku, 2017
- The Woman. A Collection of poems. Aysel A. Alizada. Contemporary Azerbaijani Poetry in English. Mutarjim Publishing House, Baku, 2017
- The Smell of Snow. A Collection of poems. Sona Valiyeva. Contemporary Azerbaijani Poetry in English. Zardabi LTD MMC Publishing House, Baku, 2018
- The Way to Love. A Collection of poems. Musa Urud. Contemporary Azerbaijani Poetry in English. Mutarjim Publishing House, Baku, 2019
- Stay in My Heart. A Collection of poems. Nazim Ahmadli. Contemporary Azerbaijani Poetry in English. Mutarjim Publishing House, Baku, 2021
- You are Your Own Way. A Collection of poems. Ramiz Rovshan. Contemporary Azerbaijani Poetry in English. Mutarjim Publishing House, Baku, 2021
- The Scent of Roses. Short stories. Zemfira Maharramli Contemporary Azerbaijani Prose in English. Mutarjim Publishing House, Baku, 2022

== Awards ==
- H.B. Zardabi prize, 1999
- Golden Word literature prize by Ministry of Culture for the translation book Nobody Ever Dies, 2011
- Rasul Rza International literature prize, 2016, Baku
- International literature prize "Rodnoy Dom", 2016, Minsk, Belarus
