= Abdulkerim Alizada =

Azerbaijani historian and oriental scientist

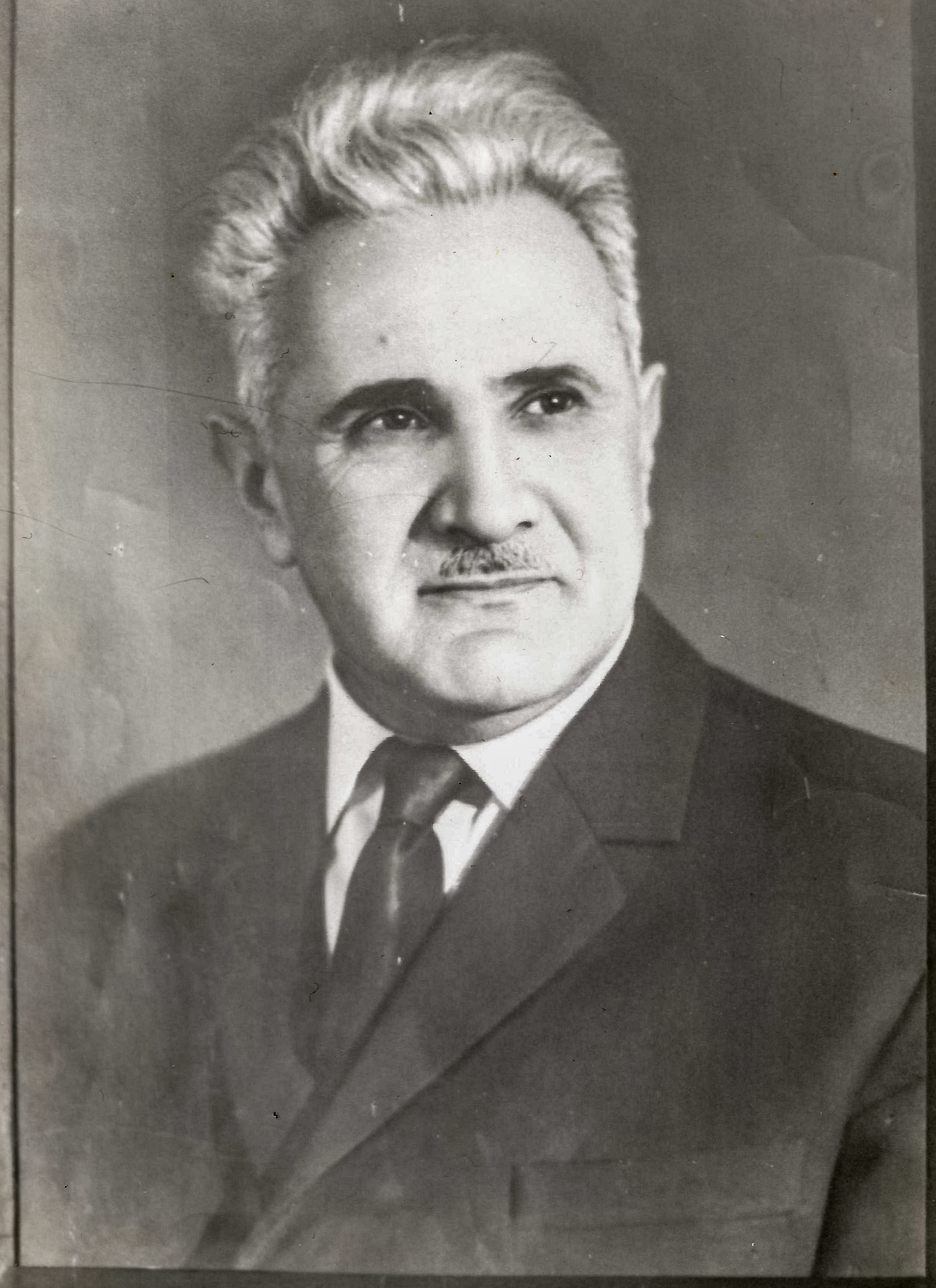
Portrait of Abdulkerim Alizada

Abdulkerim Alizada (in Azerbaijani – Əbdülkərim Əlizadə; in English sometimes spelled as Alizadeh or Alizade; 1906–1979), was an Azerbaijani historian, writer, and orientalist and a member of the Azerbaijan National Academy of Sciences. His works spans the medieval history of Azerbaijan and the countries of the Near and Middle East. Because of his contributions and researches, Alizada was awarded the USSR State Prize in Science (1948), the Mirza Fatali Akhundov State Prize of the Azerbaijan SSR (1978), the Order of the Red Banner of Labour (1966), Medal "For the Defence of the Caucasus", Medal "For Valiant Labour in the Great Patriotic War 1941–1945", and the Order of the Badge of Honour.

== Biography ==
Alizada was born on 11 January 1906 into the family of a religious community leader, Sheikh Ali, in the village of Bilgah, north of Baku. In 1908 the family moved to Tehran, where Alizada spent his childhood years, received his primary education, and mastered Persian and Arabic. Upon returning to Baku in 1917, he continued his studies at a special secondary school. In 1922 he enrolled in the Rabfak (workers' faculty), from which he graduated in 1926. In the same year, Abdulkerim was assigned to the Leningrad Institute of Oriental Studies. Upon graduation from the Institute in 1930, he was admitted to the postgraduate course of the State Academy of the History of Material Culture. The academic environment of Leningrad was crucial to Alizada's development as a scientist, determining the main directions of his future scientific research. His teachers were leading lights of Russian and international Oriental studies such as Vasily Bartold, Nikolai Marr, Ignaty Krachkovsky, Ivan Meshchaninov, Aleksandr Romaskevich, Alexander Samoylovich, Vasily Struve, and others. After defending his PhD thesis in 1935, Alizada took a position as a research fellow at the Museum of Asia (currently known as the Institute of Oriental Manuscripts of the Russian Academy of Sciences) in Leningrad. During the same period, he taught Persian at the Leningrad Institute of Oriental Studies (1936–1938) and at the Faculty of Oriental Studies of the Leningrad State University (1938–1939).

Alizada was a member of the Academy of Sciences of the Azerbaijan SSR since 1955. He was awarded the degree of the Honoured Scientist of the Azerbaijan SSR in 1960. He was the first director of the Institute of Oriental Studies of the Academy of Sciences of the Azerbaijan SSR (1958–1963).

== Scientific research ==
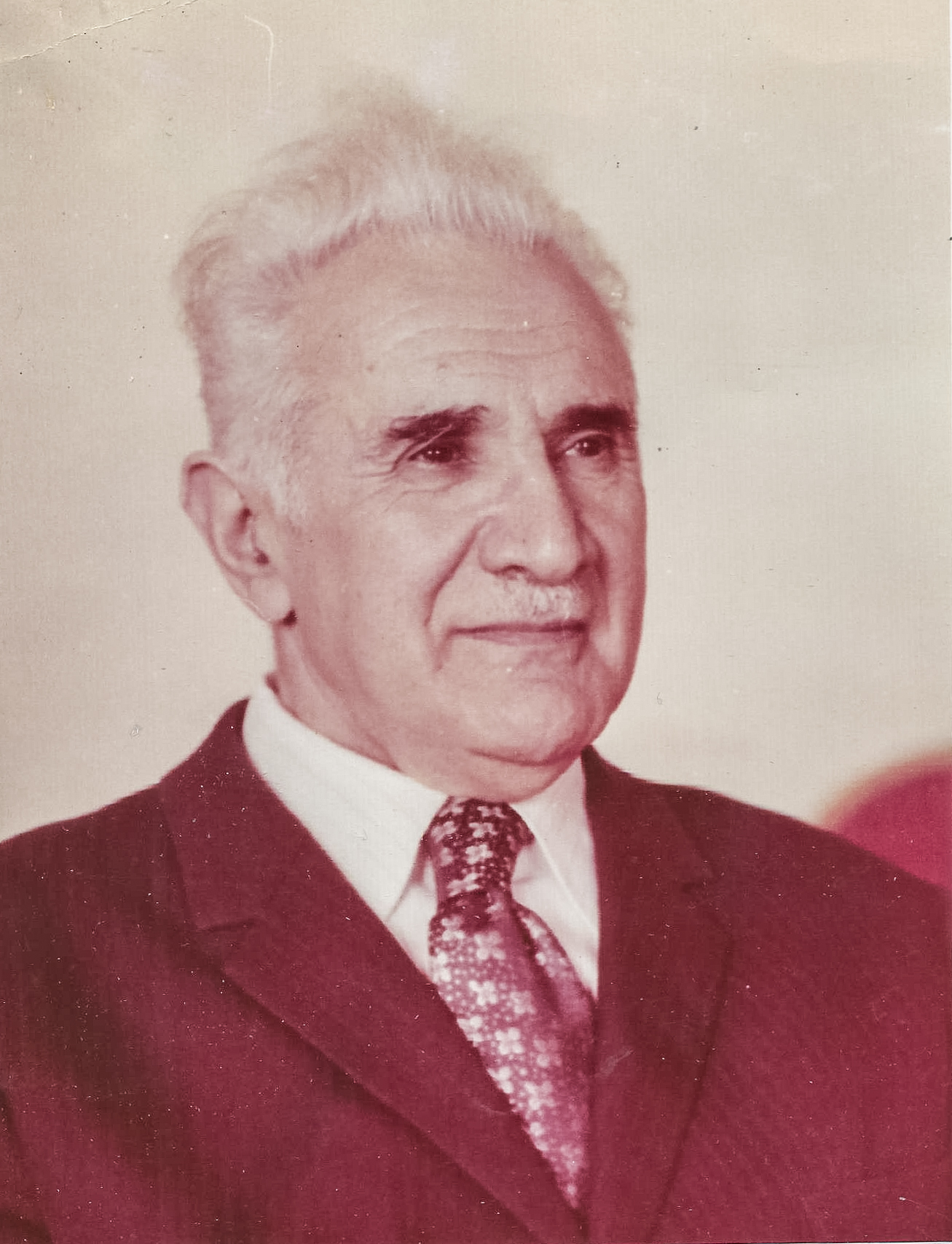
Portrait of Abdulkerim Alizada

While still a postgraduate student, Alizada began research on forms of land ownership and the tax system in Azerbaijan in the thirteenth and fourteenth centuries, which later became the subject of his PhD thesis. He examined a vast amount of Persian-language literature, particularly manuscripts, delving into the works of Rashid al-Din, Ata-Malik Juvayni, Wassaf, Hamdullah Kazvini, and other luminaries of the medieval East. He also actively participated in the Ladoga Archaeological Expedition and maintained his passion for archaeology throughout his entire life. Soon, he established himself as a brilliant expert in medieval Persian literature. For this reason, he was appointed to prepare a scholarly edition of Jami al-tawarikh (The Collection of Chronicles), the monumental work of the medieval historian and scholar Rashid al-Din. Alizada completed this challenging task with the utmost care and The Collection of Chronicles was published as a monograph. In 1938, Alizada, together with Evgenii Bertels, A.A. Aleskerzada, F. Babaev, L.A. Khetagurov, and O.I. Smirnova, began preparing a scholarly-critical edition of the "Khamsa" ("Quintet"). The work was completed in 1940. At the outbreak of World War II, Alizada returned to Baku and took the position of senior researcher at the Institute of History of the Azerbaijani branch of the USSR Academy of Sciences. He was appointed director of the Institute in 1944.

In 1948, Abdulkerim Alizada and Evgenii Eduardovich Bertels were awarded the State Stalin Prize in Science for the publication of their scholarly edition of the Sharafnama of Nizami. Alizada defended his doctoral thesis, "Social, Economic, and Political History of Azerbaijan in the 13th–14th centuries", in Moscow in 1954. It was subsequently published as a separate monograph. Abdulkerim Alizada was elected as full member of the Academy of Sciences of the Azerbaijan SSR in 1955. He was the academic secretary of the Department of Social Sciences of the Academy of Sciences of the Azerbaijan SSR during 1955–1957. From 1958 to 1963 he was the first director of the Institute of Near and Middle East (established in 1958 and currently known as the Institute of Oriental Studies) of the Academy of Sciences of the Azerbaijan SSR. From 1963 until the end of his life, Abdulkerim Alizada headed the Department of Textology and Publishing of the Institute of Oriental Studies of the Azerbaijan Academy of Sciences. During the last two decades of his life, Alizada focused his efforts on publishing historical sources covering the history of Iran and Azerbaijan during the Mongol rule. In particular, he meticulously revisited the two volumes of Jami al-tawarikh (the "Collection of Chronicles") by Rashid al-Din, which had been compiled before the war but had remained unpublished. He also edited and published Gulistan-i Iram by Abbasgulu Bakikhanov and three volumes of Dastur al-Katib fi-Tayin al-Maratib by Muhammad ibn Hendushah Nakhjavani. These studies represented a significant contribution to the development of science in Azerbaijan. In recognition of his achievements, Abdulkerim Alizada was awarded the State Prize of the Azerbaijan SSR in 1978. His work has been published in English, German, Persian, Arabic, and Turkish.

== Legacy ==
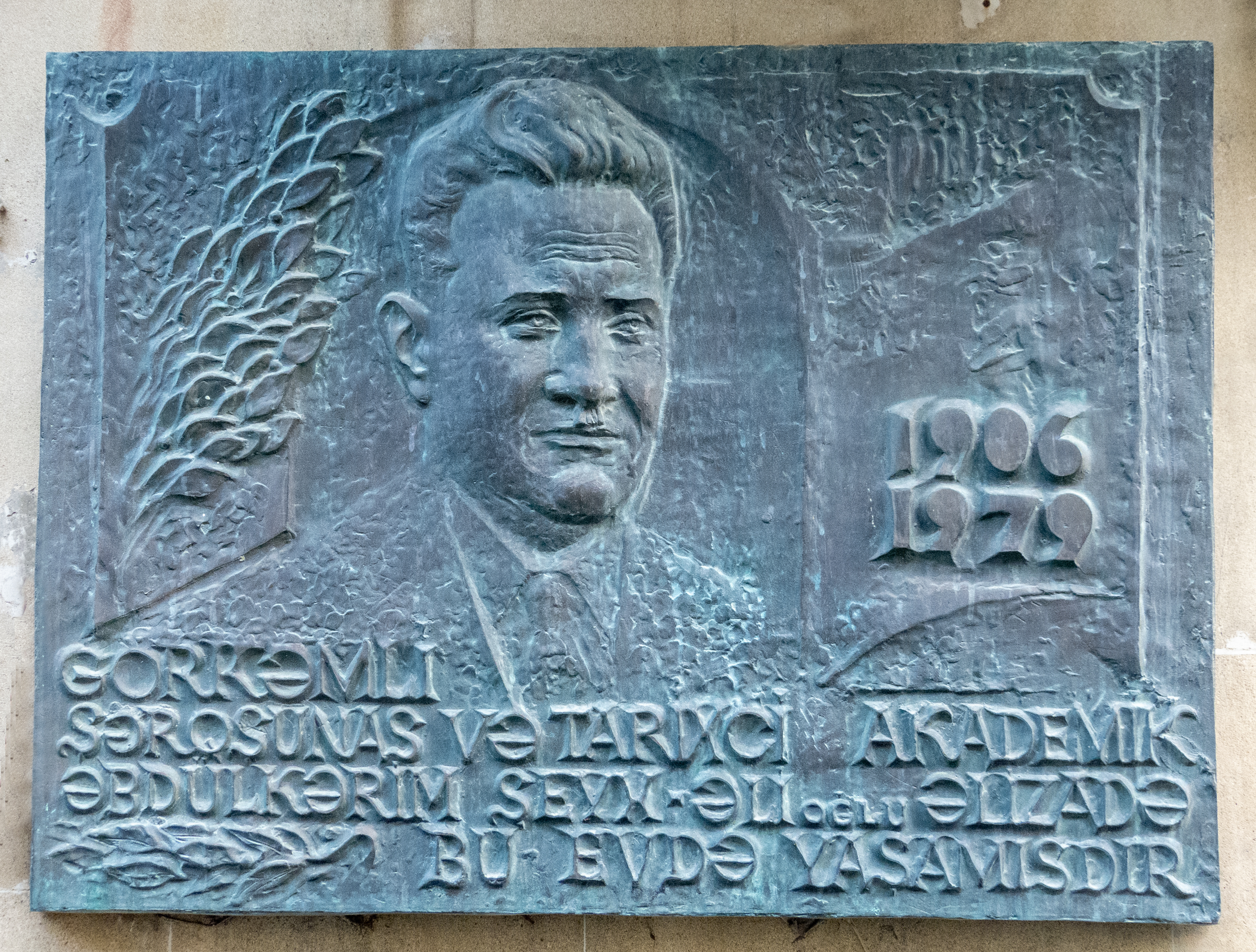
Memorial plaque on the house where Abdulkerim Alizada lived in central Baku

Alizada published more than a hundred scientific works in his lifetime. He was the pioneering researcher of the forms of medieval land ownership and tax systems in Azerbaijan. He established a scientific field of textologists-medievalists in the Azerbaijan SSR. His research in this field, along with his other publications, marked a crucial stage in the development of medieval studies in Azerbaijan. As Azerbaijan's first prominent medievalist, he played an outstanding role in laying the foundations of this science in Azerbaijan and contributed to the training of an entire generation of researchers. As a result of many years of work, he created his original concept of the history of Azerbaijan in the thirteenth and fourteenth centuries. He participated in international congresses in Warsaw (1955), Munich (1957), Ankara (1961, 1970), Tehran (1966, 1969), Tabriz (1969), and other cities.

Abdulkerim Alizada died on 3 December 1979. The street where he lived in central Baku has been renamed in his honour.
