= Herbert Swears =

British writer

- Born: 26 December 1868; Surrey, United Kingdom
- Died: 26 December 1946 (aged 78); Sussex, United Kingdom
- Citizenship: British subject

Herbert William Swears (26 December 1868 in Surrey – 6 March 1946 in Sussex) was an author and playwright active in the United Kingdom between 1890 and 1920. He worked as a bank clerk and his father was blind. He wrote 22 published works including novellette and plays. Herbert Swears's one-act play The Young Idea was seen in 1936, long after publication across the Atlantic. A tight corner was revived as recently as 2012 by the Comedy Playhouse in Arizona. Swears acted as honorary secretary to the Irving Dramatic Society. Herbert toured the world at least once with a renowned actress Dame Madge Kendal.

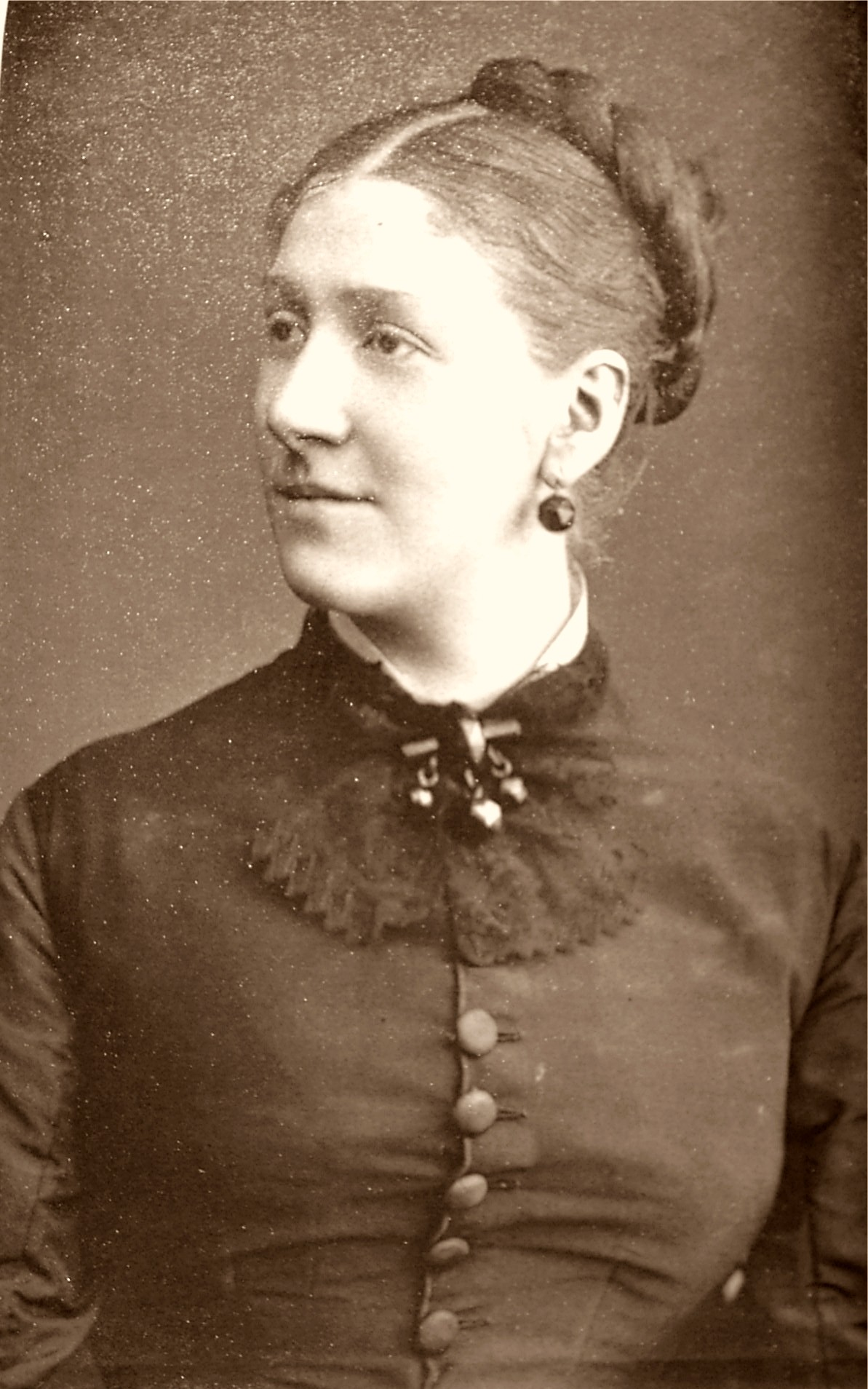
Actress Madge Kendal was in several Swears premieres at the Royal Portsmouth Theatre.

== Works ==
- 1890 Semi Detached
- 1890 Wayfarers
- 1890 Home sweet home with variations
- 1890 Love and Dentistry
- 1890 Twilight
- 1890 Home sweet home with variations
- 1901 Too Many Cooks
- 1903 Pansy, that's for thoughts
- 1904 Mere Man one-act farce – love triangle involving members of an emancipated women's club
- 1905 Two on a bus
- 1910 A tight Corner
- 1911 Granny's Juliet (novellette monologue)
- 1911 Hero and Heroine
- 1915 Dog Days
- 1916 The unknown quantity
- 1920 Captain X: A farcical comedy in three acts
- 1922 Cupboard Love: A costume comedy in one act
- 1922 The Young Idea
- 1926 Woman's crowning glory
- 1927 Things are seldom what they seem
- 1930 Interlude
- 1937 When all is said and done Memoir
- Widows – adapted to the Scots dialect by Margaret M. Muir (1933)
- The Whirlpool
- The House of Clay
- Such is Fame
- Lady Interviewer
- Cupid Astray
