= Inte Onsman =

Dutch playwright and trade unionist

Willem Inte Onsman (Harlingen, 28 September 1872 - Amsterdam, 26 August 1929) was a Dutch playwright and trade unionist.

Born in the province of Friesland, Inte Onsman moved to Amsterdam after the death of his father. His mother sent him to a barbershop as apprentice. After finishing school he became a barber. As a young man he joined a theatre company as an actor, but a few years later he left the group and started his own barbershop. His socialist sympathies drew him to the Dutch social-democratic party SDAP and the barbers trade union. He became the national secretary of the union, a position he held until his death.

Around 1900 Onsman started writing plays. His most successful was Het licht in den nacht (A light in the night) which dealt with the poor during World War I. In the Netherlands it was performed more than hundred times. It was translated in German, Danish and English. Onsman also wrote an autobiographical novel, that appeared in 1929, the year of his sudden death.
