= Afag Masud =

People's writer of Azerbaijan (born 1957)

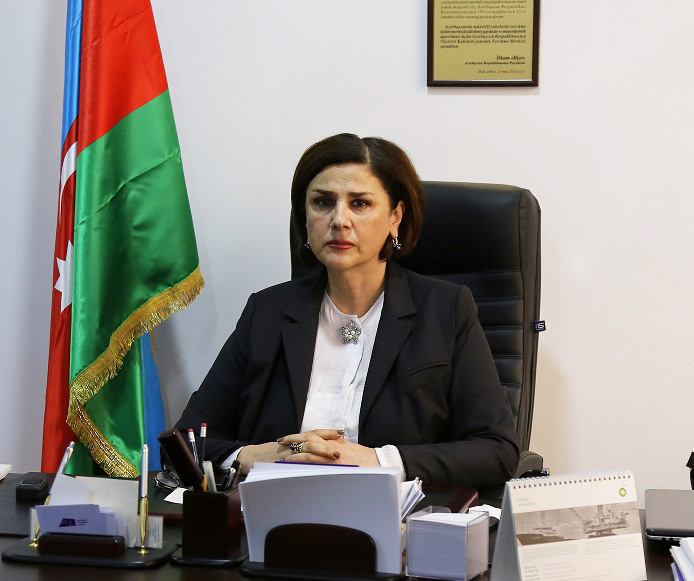
- Native name: Afaq Məsud
- Born: 3 June 1957 (age 68) Baku, Azerbaijan SSR, Soviet Union
- Occupation: Writer, playwright
- Language: Azerbaijani
- Citizenship: Soviet Union→ Azerbaijan
- Education: Baku State University
- Notable awards: People's Writer of Azerbaijan; Shohrat Order; Azerbaijan Democratic Republic 100th anniversary medal; Humay Award

Website
- afaqmesud.az

Afag Masud (Azerbaijani: Afaq Məsud) (born 3 June 1957, Baku) is an Azerbaijani writer, and playwright. She has been honored with the title of People’s Writer, Honored Art Worker, a full member of Peter’s Academy of Art and Science, a full member of the European Academy of Sciences, Arts, and Literature, and a member of the Georgian Writers Association. Board Chair of the Azerbaijan Translation Centre and editor-in-chief of the “Khazar” World Literature Magazine. playwright, Honored Art Worker, "Humay" award winner, chief editor of "Khazar" world literature magazine, recipient of the Personal Presidential Pension of the Republic of Azerbaijan (2025).

== Life and literary career ==
Afag Masud was born on 3rd June 1957 into an intellectual family in Baku. She graduated in journalism from Baku State University in 1979. Worked as an editor and editorial board member for Azerbaijanfilm Studio (1979–1986), and Director of “Azerbaijantelefilm” Studio (1986–1988). In 1989–2014, her positions included: Chair of the Republican Centre of Translation and Literary Relations, and editor-in-chief of the “Khazar” World Literature Magazine.

She was appointed Director of the Translation Centre under the Cabinet of Ministers of the Azerbaijan Republic by Decree 501 of President of Azerbaijan Ilham Aliyev dated 16th May 2014, and Board Chair of the Azerbaijan State Translation Centre by the Presidential Order 110 dated 18th May 2018.

She is the author of novels, plays, essays, and short stories.

Her works, interviews, and articles have been issued in publishing houses and media in many countries, and published on cultural and literary portals.

She is the author of such plays, as “At Death’s Door”, “He Loves Me”, “Getting to Leave”, “Woman under a Train”, “Karbala”, and “Mansur Al-Hallaj.” The plays “At Death’s Door”, “He Loves Me” have been staged in the State (Theatre Director – Vagif Ibrahimoghlu), and the play “Woman under a Train” have been staged in the Academic National Drama Theatre (Theatre Director –Mehriban Alakbarzade.)

Her works “The Sparrows” (Television Director – Eyvaz Valiyev), “The Party” (Television Director – Tariyel Valiyev) have been made into television dramas, and “Night” (Film Director – Teymur Guliyev), “Punishment” (Film Director – Mehriban Alakbarzade), and “The Death of the Rabbit” (Film Director – L. Najafzade) - into television movies.

She has translated into Azerbaijani a number of foreign works, such as the novels “Autumn of the Patriarch” by Gabriel García Márquez, “The Web and the Rock” by Thomas Wolfe, tazkira books by Muhammad Nasifi, Abu Hamid al-Ghazālī, Ibn Arabi, and Jalal ad-Din Rumi. The reading and discussion of the novel “Procession” in German were held at the Berlin Literary House in 1994.

In 2000, a doctoral dissertation from the University of Vienna on her literary creativity was defended (Sena Dogan “Female Writers in European Oriental Studies”).

In 2004, the radio play “Die Sperlinge” (“The Sparrows”), based on the motives of the same story, was broadcast on Vienna radio.

She is also famous for translating works by authors such as Franz Kafka, Guy de Maupassant and Gabriel García Márquez into Azeri. She currently works as the editor-in-chief of the Azerbaijani literary magazine Khazar.

== List of works ==
- On the Third Floor
- Saturday Night
- Saturday Night
- Reincarnation
- Alone
- Procession
- Freedom
- Novella, essay, short story
- Writing
- John Paul II.
- The Seal
- Selected Works (in two volumes)
- Novel-short story
- Procession (Kalabalık)
- Towards the Light
- Procession
- Selected Works
- Saturday Night and other short stories
- Spelling Dictionary of the Azerbaijani Language
- Freedom
- John II
- Shusha – Pearl of Karabakh.
- ("Dormitory", read in English)
- The Crash, read in English
- The Sparrows, read in English
- The death of the Rabbit, read in English

== Prizes and awards ==
- was awarded the honorary title “Honoured Art Worker” by Decree of the President of the Republic of Azerbaijan, Ilham Aliyev, in 2003;
- was the winner of the International Stage Play Contest held in Türkiye in 2015;
- was awarded the Shohrat Order in 2017 for her contribution to developing the translation industry in the country by Order of the President of the Azerbaijan Republic Ilham Aliyev.
- was awarded the title of People’s Writer by Decree of President of Azerbaijan Ilham Aliyev in 2019 for her services to the development of Azerbaijani culture;
- was awarded with the jubilee medal “100th Anniversary of Azerbaijan Democratic Republic” in 2019;
- was repeatedly awarded the TURKSOY medal for her successful activities on the strengthening of literary relations with Turkic-speaking countries and for her special merits in the development of theatrical art in 2015-2021;
- was awarded the honorary title “Cultural Ambassador” and Ivane Machabeli Prize of the Georgian Writers Association in 2019;
- was awarded the Mikheil Javakhishvili Prize of Rustaveli Society in Georgia in 2022;
- was awarded the Georgi Leonidze Gold Medal of the Georgian Writers Association and the title of “Honoured Worker of Culture” of the Rustaveli Society of Intellectuals for her activities on developing literary and cultural relations between Azerbaijan and Georgia in 2023.
- was awarded the Personal Presidential Pension of the Republic of Azerbaijan on January 16, 2025, by President Ilham Aliyev for her contributions to the development of Azerbaijani literature.
