= Central Auditing Commission of the 26th Congress of the Communist Party of the Soviet Union =

This electoral term of the Central Auditing Commission was elected by the 26th Congress of the Communist Party of the Soviet Union in 1981, and was in session until the convocation of the 27th Congress in 1986.

== Composition ==
Members of the Central Auditing Commission of the 26th Congress of the Communist Party of the Soviet Union
Name	Cyrillic	25th CAC	27th CAC	Birth	Death	PM	Nationality	Gender	Ref.
Alexander Aleksankin	Александр Алексанкин	Old	Reelected	1929	2014	1956	Belarusian	Male	
Zamina Aslanova	Замина Асланова	New	Not	1940	2019	1962	Azerbaijani	Female	
Boris Batsanov	Борис Бацанов	Old	Not	1927	2005	1951	Russian	Male	
Aleksandr Bovin	Александр Бовин	New	Not	1930	2004	1952	Russian	Male	
Lidziya Bryzha	Лидия Брызга	New	CC	1943	2014	1975	Belarusian	Female	
Nina Burakova	Нина Буракова	New	Not	1934	2001	1976	Russian	Female	
Valentina Cherkashina	Валентина Черкашина	New	CC	1942	2012	1972	Russian	Female	
Vitaly Chudin	Виталий Чудин	New	Not	1929	?	1954	Russian	Male	
Ekaterina Demidova	Екатерина Демидова	Old	Not	1940	2018	1967	Russian	Female	
Kamshat Donenbayeva	Камшат Доненбаева	New	Not	1943	2017	1967	Kazakh	Female	
David Dragunsky	Давид Драгунский	Old	Reelected	1910	1992	1931	Jew	Male	
Anatoly Dumachev	Анатолий Думачёв	New	Reelected	1932	2004	1957	Kazakh	Male	
Leonid Efremov	Леонид Ефремов	Old	Reelected	1921	2007	1941	Russian	Male	
Valentin Falin	Baлeнтин Фaлин	Old	CC	1926	2018	1953	Russian	Male	
Alevtina Fedulova	Алевтина Федулова	New	Not	1940	2026	1963	Russian	Female	
Dmitry Galkin	Дмитрий Галкин	CC	Reelected	1926	2014	1949	Russian	Male	
Pavel Gilashvili	Павел Гилашвили	Old	Reelected	1918	1994	1939	Georgian	Male	
Nikolai Glushkov	Николай Глушков	Old	Not	1918	1999	1945	Russian	Male	
Vasily Golubev	Василий Голубев	Old	Not	1913	1992	1940	Russian	Male	
Tamara Golubtsova	Тамара Голубцова	Old	Not	1928	2001	1954	Russian	Female	
Vasily Grebenyuk	Василий Гребенюк	New	Reelected	1924	2000	1943	Russian	Male	
Maria Gromova	Мария Громова	New	CC	1929	2008	1973	Russian	Female	
Ivan Gubin	Иван Губин	New	Died	1922	1982	1941	Russian	Male	
Yuri Izrael	Юрий Израэль	New	Reelected	1930	2014	1955	Russian	Male	
Chary Karryev	Чары Каррыев	New	Not	1932	Alive	1958	Turkmen	Male	
Valentina Kasimova	Валентина Касимова	New	CC	1944	Alive	1972	Russian	Female	
Vera Kemashvili	Вера Кемашвили	New	Not	1929	Alive	1955	Georgian	Female	
Mikhail Khaldeev	Михаил Халдеев	Old	Reelected	1912	2016	1947	Russian	Male	
Gurban Khalilov	Курбан Халилов	Old	Not	1906	2000	1926	Azerbaijani	Male	
Alexander Kharlamov	Александр Харламов	Old	Reelected	1929	2004	1952	Russian	Male	
Leonid Khitrun	Леонид Хитрун	New	CC	1930	2009	1955	Belarusian	Male	
Domna Komarova	Домна Комарова	Old	Reelected	1920	1994	1940	Russian	Female	
Veniamin Konnov	Вениамин Коннов	Old	Reelected	1921	1991	1946	Russian	Male	
Anatoly Konstantinov	Анатолий Константинов	New	CC	1923	2006	1946	Russian	Male	
Valentin Koptyug	Валентин Коптюг	New	CC	1931	1997	1961	Belarusian	Male	
Temirbek Koshoyev	Темирбек Кошоев	New	CC	1931	2009	1952	Kyrgyz	Male	
Ivan Kostyukov	Иван Костюков	Old	Reelected	1926	2001	1951	Russian	Male	
Nikolay Kovalyov	Николай Ковалёв	New	Not	1922	?	1945	Russian	Male	
Sergey Losev	Сергей Лосев	New	Reelected	1927	1988	1953	Russian	Male	
Galina Lotsmanova	Галина Лоцманова	Old	Not	1944	Alive	1967	Russian	Female	
Anatoly Lukyanov	Анатолия Лукьянова	New	CC	1930	2019	1955	Russian	Male	
Vasily Malykhin	Василий Малыхин	New	CC	1935	Alive	1958	Russian	Male	
Salijan Mamarasulov	Салиджан Мамарасулов	New	CC	1930	2005	1958	Uzbek	Male	
Nazrilla Mannapov	Назрилла Маннапов	New	Not	1930	2009	1959	Uzbek	Male	
Vitaliy Masol	Виталий Масол	New	CC	1928	2018	1956	Ukrainian	Male	
Vadim Medvedev	вадим медведев	Old	CC	1929	2025	1952	Russian	Male	
Afanasy Melnichenko	Афанасий Мельниченко	Old	Not	1923	2008	1943	Ukrainian	Male	
Nina Minovalova	Нина Миновалова	New	Not	1936	2021	1968	Russian	Female	
Vladimir Mitskevich	Владимир Мицкевич	Old	Not	1920	1983	1944	Belarusian	Male	
Dmitry Motorny	Дмитрий Моторный	New	CC	1927	2018	1951	Ukrainian	Male	
Rahmon Nabiyev	Рахмон Набиев	Old	Not	1930	1993	1960	Tajik	Male	
Nursultan Nazarbayev	Нурсултан Назарбаев	New	CC	1940	Alive	1962	Kazakh	Male	
Ivan Nayashkov	Иван Наяшков	New	Reelected	1924	1998	1961	Kazakh	Male	
Timofey Osetrov	Тимофей Осётров	Old	Not	1920	2018	1947	Russian	Male	
Sergey Pavlov	Сергей Павлов	Old	Not	1929	1993	1954	Russian	Male	
Viktor Popov	Ви́ктор Попо́в	New	Not	1918	2007	1947	Russian	Male	
Stanislav Postnikov	Станислав Постников	New	Reelected	1928	2012	1957	Russian	Male	
Ivan Pudkov	Иван Пудков	New	Not	1916	2002	1945	Russian	Male	
Aleksey Rumyantsev	Алексей Румянцев	Old	Not	1919	2008	1940	Russian	Male	
Antonina Ryndina	Антонина Рындина	New	Reelected	1942	Alive	1973	Russian	Female	
Nikita Ryzhov	Никита Рыжов	Old	Not	1907	1996	1928	Russian	Male	
Fadey Sargsyan	Фадей Саркисян	New	CC	1923	2010	1945	Armenian	Male	
Leonid Sharayev	Леонид Шараев	New	Reelected	1935	2021	1957	Ukrainian	Male	
Fyodor Shishlov	Фёдор Шишлов	New	Not	1931	Alive	1968	Russian	Male	
Ilya Shcherbakov	Илья Щербаков	Old	Not	1912	1996	1937	Russian	Male	
Ivan Shkuratov	Иван Шкуратов	Old	Not	1913	1994	1943	Russian	Male	
Gennady Sizov	Геннадий Сизов	Old	Reelected	1903	1991	1926	Russian	Male	
Ringaudas Songaila	Рингаудас Сонгайла	New	Reelected	1929	2019	1953	Lithuanian	Male	
Pyotr Strautmanis	Пётр Страутманис	Old	Not	1919	2007	1944	Latvian	Male	
Oleg Troyanovsky	Олег Трояновский	New	CC	1919	2003	1947	Russian	Male	
Raisa Udalaya	Замина Асланова	New	CC	1931	2020	1974	Russian	Female	
Mikhail Ulyanov	Михаил Ульянов	Old	Reelected	1927	2007	1951	Russian	Male	
Nikolay Umanets	Николай Уманец	New	Not	1925	1986	1953	Ukrainian	Male	
Ion Ustian	Иван Устиян	New	Not	1939	Alive	1961	Moldovan	Male	
Boris Yakovlev	Михаил Ульянов	New	Not	1908	2008	1931	Russian	Male	
