= Central Auditing Commission of the 27th Congress of the Communist Party of the Soviet Union =

This electoral term of the Central Auditing Commission was elected by the 27th Congress of the Communist Party of the Soviet Union in 1986, and was in session until the convocation of the 28th Congress in 1990.

== Composition ==
Members of the Central Auditing Commission of the 27th Congress of the Communist Party of the Soviet Union
Name	Cyrillic	26th CAC	28th CC	Birth	Death	PM	Nationality	Gender	Ref.
Vladimir Adylov	Владимир Адылов	New	Not	1948	Alive	1972	Uzbek	Male	
Alexander Aleksankin	Александр Алексанкин	Old	Not	1929	2014	1956	Belarusian	Male	
Georgy Anufriev	Георгий Ануфриев	New	Not	1940	Alive	1964	Russian	Male	
Gayane Avakyan	Гаяне Авакян	New	Not	1954	Alive	1977	Armenian	Female	
Lucia Balykova	Люция Балыкова	New	Resigned	1931	2010	1970	Russian	Female	
Alexander Baranov	Александр Баранов	New	Not	1928	2003	1951	Russian	Male	
Albert Belyaev	Альберт Беляев	New	Not	1928	Alive	1950	Russian	Male	
Zaina Beyshekeyeva	Зайна Бейшекеева	New	Member	1955	Alive	1977	Kyrgyz	Female	
Nikolay Bukharin	Николай Бухарин	New	Not	1947	Alive	1970	Russian	Male	
Valery Bykov	Валерий Быков	New	Not	1938	Alive	1966	Russian	Male	
David Dragunsky	Давид Драгунский	Old	Not	1910	1992	1931	Jew	Male	
Yuri Dubinin	Юрий Дубинин	New	Not	1930	2013	1954	Russian	Male	
Anatoly Dumachev	Анатолий Думачёв	Old	Not	1932	2004	1957	Kazakh	Male	
Apas Dzhumagulov	Апас Джумагулов	New	Not	1934	Alive	1962	Kyrgyz	Male	
Leonid Efremov	Леонид Ефремов	Old	Resigned	1921	2007	1941	Russian	Male	
Pyotr Erpilov	Пётр Ерпилов	New	Resigned	1926	2005	1953	Russian	Male	
Anatoly Fateyev	анатолий фатеев	New	Not	1931	2006	1956	Russian	Male	
Dmitry Galkin	Дмитрий Галкин	Old	Not	1926	2014	1949	Russian	Male	
Pavel Gilashvili	Павел Гилашвили	Old	Resigned	1918	1994	1939	Georgian	Male	
Vasily Grebenyuk	Василий Гребенюк	Old	Resigned	1924	2000	1943	Russian	Male	
Zulaikho Gulova	Зулайхо Гулова	New	Not	1955	Alive	1977	Tajik	Female	
Yuri Izrael	Юрий Израэль	Old	Not	1930	2014	1955	Russian	Male	
Gennady Kabasin	Геннадий Кабасин	New	Not	1937	2016	1960	Russian	Male	
Ivan Kapitonov	Иван Капитонов	CC	Resigned	1915	2002	1939	Russian	Male	
Galina Kasyanova	Галина Касьянова	New	Not	1951	Alive	1978	Russian	Female	
Mikhail Khaldeev	Михаил Халдеев	Old	Not	1912	2016	1947	Russian	Male	
Alexander Kharlamov	Александр Харламов	Old	Not	1929	2004	1952	Russian	Male	
Annamurad Khojamuradov	Аннамурад Ходжамурадов	New	Not	1935	?	1961	Turkmen	Male	
Yuri Khusainov	Юрий Хусаинов	New	Not	1929	?	1953	Russian	Male	
Domna Komarova	Домна Комарова	Old	Resigned	1920	1994	1940	Russian	Female	
Viktor Komplektov	Ви́ктор Компле́ктов	New	Not	1932	2020	1962	Russian	Male	
Veniamin Konnov	Вениамин Коннов	Old	Not	1921	1991	1946	Russian	Male	
Heldi-Melaine Koppel	Хельди-Мелайне Коппель	New	Not	1935	Alive	1956	Estonian	Female	
Ivan Kostyukov	Иван Костюков	Old	Not	1926	2001	1951	Russian	Male	
Anatoly Kovalev	Анатолий Ковалёв	New	Not	1923	2002	1945	Russian	Male	
Valentina Krasnenkova	Валентина Красненкова	New	Not	1939	Alive	1968	Russian	Female	
Leonty Krivoruchko	Леонтий Криворучко	New	Resigned	1927	2003	1952	Ukrainian	Male	
Pavel Laptev	Хельди-Мелайне Коппель	New	Not	1928	2011	1951	Russian	Male	
Sergey Losev	Сергей Лосев	Old	Died	1927	1988	1953	Russian	Male	
Ada Maksimkina	Ада Максимкина	New	Not	1940	Alive	1968	Latvian	Female	
Nikolai Moiseyev	Николай Моисеев	New	Member	1934	2020	1955	Russian	Male	
Alexandru Mocanu	Александр Мокану	New	Not	1934	2018	1968	Moldovan	Male	
Ivan Nayashkov	Иван Наяшков	Old	Not	1924	1998	1961	Kazakh	Male	
Alla Nizovtseva	Алла Низовцева	New	Not	1930	2013	1955	Russian	Female	
Vera Odobescu	Вера Одобеску	New	Not	1934	?	1958	Moldovan	Female	
Gaibnazar Pallayev	Гаибназар Паллаев	New	Not	1929	2000	1957	Tajik	Male	
Nikolai Popov	Николай Попов	New	Not	1930	2008	1953	Russian	Male	
Stanislav Postnikov	Станислав Постников	Old	Not	1928	2012	1957	Russian	Male	
Kabdulla Romazanov	Кабдулла Ромазанов	New	Not	1947	Alive	1970	Kazakh	Male	
Nikolai Rubtsov	Николай Рубцов	New	Not	1931	Alive	1954	Russian	Male	
Arnold Rüütel	Арнольд Рюйтель	New	Not	1928	2024	1964	Estonian	Male	
Ivan Rybakov	Иван Рыбаков	New	Not	1947	Alive	1969	Russian	Male	
Antonina Ryndina	Тамилла Рзаева	Old	Not	1942	Alive	1973	Russian	Female	
Tamilla Rzayeva	Антонина Рындина	New	Member	1951	Alive	1978	Azerbaijani	Female	
Makhtay Sagdiyev	Арнольд Рюйтель	New	Not	1929	2012	1953	Kazakh	Male	
Nikolay Samilyk	Николай Самилык	New	Not	1937	?	1961	Ukrainian	Male	
Vitaly Shabanov	Виталий Шабанов	New	Not	1939	?	1962	Russian	Male	
Atabally Shalyyev	Атабаллы Шалыев	New	Not	1945	?	1976	Turkmen	Male	
Viktor Sharapov	Виктор Шарапов	New	Not	1931	2019	1958	Russian	Male	
Leonid Sharayev	Леонид Шараев	Old	Not	1935	2021	1957	Ukrainian	Male	
Nina Sherbakova	Нина Щербакова	New	Not	1937	?	1964	Russian	Female	
Ivan Shinkevich	Иван Шинкевич	New	Not	1937	?	1961	Belarusian	Male	
Lyudmila Shvetsova	Людмила Швецова	New	Member	1949	2014	1974	Russian	Female	
Gennady Sizov	Геннадий Сизов	Old	Resigned	1903	1991	1926	Russian	Male	
Lyubov Smirnova	Любовь Смирнова	New	Not	1944	Alive	1974	Russian	Female	
Tatyana Snetkova	Татьяна Снеткова	New	Not	1950	?	1975	Russian	Female	
Ringaudas Songaila	Рингаудас Сонгайла	Old	Resigned	1929	2019	1953	Lithuanian	Male	
Vladimir Stepanov	Тимофеевич Владимир	New	Resigned	1928	2014	1956	Russian	Male	
Anatoly Storozhuk	Анатолий Сторожук	New	Member	1944	2021	1972	Ukrainian	Male	
Zinaida Stulpinene	Зинаида Стульпинене	New	Not	1941	?	1965	Lithuanian	Female	
Alexander Subbotin	Александр Суббо́тин	New	Not	1924	2010	1944	Russian	Male	
Galina Suhoruchenkova	Галина Сухорученкова	New	Not	1935	?	1958	Russian	Female	
Suleyman Tatliyev	Сулейман Татлиев	New	Not	1925	2014	1959	Azerbaijani	Male	
Sergey Tkachev	Сергей Ткачёв	New	Not	1922	2022	1950	Russian	Male	
Tatyana Trofimova	Татьяна Трофимова	New	Not	1951	?	1980	Russian	Female	
Nikolay Trubilin	Николай Трубилин	New	Not	1929	2019	1959	Russian	Male	
Mikhail Ulyanov	Михаил Ульянов	Old	Member	1927	2007	1951	Russian	Male	
Jānis Vagris	Янис Вагрис	New	Not	1930	2023	1966	Latvian	Male	
Boris Vladimirov	Борис Владимиров	New	Not	1934	2011	1961	Russian	Male	
Sergei Voenushkin	Сергей Вое́нушкин	New	Not	1929	2012	1951	Russian	Male	
Hrant Voskanyan	Грант Восканян	New	Not	1924	2005	1946	Armenian	Male	
Rudolph Yanovskiy	Рудольф Яновский	New	Not	1929	2010	1951	Russian	Male	
Alexei Zverev	Алексей Зверев	New	Resigned	1929	2021	1953	Russian	Male	

== Bibliography ==
- Staff writer (1989). "Состав Центральной Ревизионной Комиссии Коммунистической Партии Советского Союза, Избранной XXVII Съездом КПСС" [Composition of the Central Auditing Commission of the Communist Party of the Soviet Union, elected by the XXVII Congress of the CPSU] (PDF). News of the Central Committee of the CPSU (in Russian). 6 (1989). Central Committee of the Communist Party of the Soviet Union: 51–70. Archived from the original (PDF) on 2 May 2023.
