= Central Auditing Commission of the 23rd Congress of the Communist Party of the Soviet Union =

This electoral term of the Central Auditing Commission was elected by the 23rd Congress of the Communist Party of the Soviet Union in 1966, and was in session until the convocation of the 24th Congress in 1971.

== Composition ==
Members of the Central Auditing Commission of the 23rd Congress of the Communist Party of the Soviet Union
Name	Cyrillic	22nd CAC	24th CAC	Birth	Death	PM	Nationality	Gender	Ref.
Akhmadzhan Adylov	Ахмаджан Одилов	New	Not	1925	2017	1950	Uzbek	Male	
Zekeriya Aknazarov	Зекерия Акназаров	New	Not	1924	2000	1945	Bashkir	Male	
Pyotr Alekseyev	Пётр Алексеев	New	CC	1913	1999	1940	Russian	Male	
Mikhail Anikushin	Михаил Аникушин	New	Reelected	1917	1997	1944	Russian	Male	
Sergey Antonov	Сергей Антонов	New	Reelected	1911	1987	1937	Russian	Male	
Semyon Apryatkin	Семён Апряткин	New	CC	1911	1977	1948	Russian	Male	
Sergey Baskakov	Сергей Баскаков	Old	Not	1911	1986	1931	Russian	Male	
Salikh Batyev	Салих Батыев	New	Not	1911	1985	1932	Bashkir	Male	
Nikolay Belukha	Николай Белуха	New	CC	1920	1981	1948	Ukrainian	Male	
Anatoly Biryukov	Анатолий Бирюков	New	Not	1917	2013	1939	Russian	Male	
Aleksandr Botvin	Александр Ботвин	New	CC	1918	1998	1943	Ukrainian	Male	
Viktor Bushuev	Виктор Бушуев	New	Reelected	1919	1998	1947	Russian	Male	
Evgeniy Cherednichenko	Евгений Чередниченко	Old	Reelected	1912	1986	1931	Russian	Male	
Vasily Cherny	Василий Чёрный	New	CC	1913	1996	1939	Russian	Male	
Giorgi Dzotsenidze	Георгий Дзоценидзе	Old	Reelected	1910	1976	1940	Georgian	Male	
Nikolai Fedorenko	Николай Федоренко	New	Not	1912	2000	1943	Russian	Male	
Alexandra Fominykh	Александра Фоминых	New	Not	1925	2004	1961	Russian	Female	
Andrey Gorchakov	Андрей Горчаков	New	Not	1914	?	1941	Russian	Male	
Alexei Goreglyad	Алексей Горегляд	New	Reelected	1905	1986	1947	Belarusian	Male	
Alexander Gorkin	Александр Горкин	Old	Reelected	1897	1988	1916	Russian	Male	
Nagush Harutyunyan	Нагуш Арутюнян	New	Reelected	1912	1993	1942	Armenian	Male	
Kirill Ilyashenko	Кирилл Ильяшенко	New	CC	1915	1980	1945	Armenian	Male	
Mammad Isgandarov	Мамед Искендеров	New	Not	1915	1985	1943	Kurd	Male	
Yakov Kabkov	Яков Кабков	Old	CC	1908	2001	1930	Russian	Male	
Nikolay Kalmyk	Николай Калмык	New	Not	1913	2000	1939	Ukrainian	Male	
Mikhail Khaldeev	Михаил Халдеев	New	Reelected	1912	2016	1947	Russian	Male	
Makhmadullo Kholov	Махмадулло Холов	New	CC	1920	1989	1954	Tajik	Male	
Tikhon Khrennikov	Александр Трофимов	Old	Reelected	1913	2007	1947	Russian	Male	
Annamukhamed Klychev	Аннамухаммед Клычев	New	Reelected	1912	?	1947	Turkmen	Male	
Anton Kochubey	Домна Комарова	New	Died	1911	1966	1942	Russian	Male	
Maria Kolbetskaya	мария колбецкая	New	Not	1912	?	1937	Russian	Female	
Domna Komarova	Домна Комарова	New	Reelected	1920	1994	1940	Russian	Female	
Nikolay Kruchina	Николай Кручина	New	CC	1928	1991	1949	Russian	Male	
Zinaida Kruglova	Зинаида Круглова	New	Reelected	1923	1995	1944	Russian	Female	
Turabay Kulatov	Турабай Кулатов	Old	Reelected	1908	1984	1932	Kyrgyz	Male	
Lev Kulidzhanov	Лев Кулиджанов	New	Reelected	1924	2002	1931	Armenian	Male	
Pyotr Lashchenko	Пётр Лащенко	New	Not	1910	1992	1931	Ukrainian	Male	
Vladimir Lobanok	Владимир Лобанок	Old	Reelected	1907	1984	1930	Belarusian	Male	
Georgy Markov	Георгия Маркова	New	CC	1911	1991	1946	Russian	Male	
Gennady Maslennikov	Геннадий Масленников	New	Not	1929	2001	1955	Russian	Male	
Vladimir Mikulich	Владимир Микулич	New	Reelected	1920	2000	1943	Belarusian	Male	
August Molchanov	Август Молчанов	New	Not	1925	1971	1952	Russian	Male	
Ivan Morozov	Иван Морозов	New	CC	1924	1987	1943	Russian	Male	
Vasily Moskovsky	Василий Московский	Old	Not	1904	1984	1928	Russian	Male	
Nonna Muravyova	Нонна Муравьёва	Old	Not	1906	1986	1926	Russian	Female	
Aleksei Murisepp	Алексей Мюрисеп	New	Died	1902	1970	1926	Estonian	Male	
Yefim Novoselov	Ефим Новосёлов	New	Reelected	1906	1990	1925	Ukrainian	Male	
Vasily Okunev	Василий Окунев	New	CC	1920	1995	1941	Russian	Male	
Mikhail Orlov	Михаил Орлов	Old	Not	1912	1996	1940	Russian	Male	
Aleksandr Panyushkin	Алекса́ндр Па́нюшкин	Old	Not	1905	1974	1927	Russian	Male	
Ivan Pavlovsky	Иван Павловский	New	CC	1909	1999	1939	Ukrainian	Male	
Pyotr Pigalev	Пётр Пигалев	Old	Reelected	1911	1975	1931	Russian	Male	
Boris Popov	Борис Попов	Old	CC	1909	1993	1931	Russian	Male	
Aleksey Poskonov	Алексей Посконов	New	Died	1904	1969	1928	Russian	Male	
Aleksey Rumyantsev	Алексей Румянцев	New	Reelected	1919	2008	1940	Russian	Male	
Konstantin Rusakov	Константин Русаков	New	CC	1909	1993	1943	Russian	Male	
Nikita Ryzhov	Никита Рыжов	New	Reelected	1907	1996	1928	Russian	Male	
Abdir Sagintayev	Абдир Сагинтаев	New	Not	1921	1986	1948	Kazakh	Male	
Ekaterina Salnikova	Екатерина Сальникова	New	CC	1928	2016	1957	Russian	Female	
Nikolai Savinkin	Николай Савинкин	New	CC	1913	1993	1937	Russian	Male	
Valentin Shashin	Валентин Шашин	New	CC	1916	1977	1939	Russian	Male	
Ilya Shcherbakov	Илья Щербаков	New	Reelected	1912	1996	1937	Russian	Male	
Dmitry Shevlyagin	Валентин Шашин	New	Died	1913	1969	1943	Russian	Male	
Iosif Shikin	Иосиф Шикин	Old	Reelected	1906	1973	1927	Russian	Male	
Vladimir Serov	Владимир Серов	Old	Not	1910	1968	1942	Russian	Male	
Kirill Simonov	Кирилл Симонов	New	Reelected	1917	1994	1943	Russian	Male	
Gennady Sizov	Геннадий Сизов	CC	Reelected	1903	1991	1926	Russian	Male	
Mikhail Smirnovsky	Михаил Смирновский	New	Reelected	1921	1989	1947	Russian	Male	
Aleksandr Soldatov	Александр Солдатов	Old	Not	1915	1999	1939	Russian	Male	
Vladimir Starovsky	Владимир Старовский	Old	Reelected	1905	1975	1939	Komi	Male	
Lyubov Sysoeva	Любовь Сысоева	New	Reelected	1940	Alive	1961	Russian	Female	
Georgy Ter-Gazaryants	Георгий Тер-Газарянц	New	Reelected	1923	Alive	1942	Azerbaijani	Male	
Nikolay Timofeev	Николай Тимофеев	New	Reelected	1913	1988	1943	Russian	Male	
Georgy Tsukanov	Георгий Цуканов	New	CC	1919	2001	1941	Russian	Male	
Saidmakhmud Usmanov	Саидмахмуд Усманов	New	CC	1929	2000	1955	Uzbek	Male	
Vasily Uvachan	Василий Увачан	New	Reelected	1917	1988	1940	Evenk	Male	
Semyon Vasyagin	Семён Васягин	New	Reelected	1910	1991	1932	Russian	Male	
Tamara Yanushkovskaya	Тамара Янушковская	New	Not	1924	Alive	1944	Russian	Female	
Yuri Zhukov	Георгий Жуков	Old	Reelected	1908	1991	1943	Russian	Male	
