= Zoya Krasnova =

Russian plant operator

- Зоя Краснова
- Born: Zoya Ignatyevna Krasnova; 12 May 1938; Popovka, Birsky District, Bashkir Autonomous Soviet Socialist Republic, Russian SFSR
- Died: 16 January 2014 (aged 75)
- Occupation: Plant operator
- Spouse: Gennady Pavlovich
- Children: 2

Zoya Ignatyevna Krasnova (Russian: Зоя Игнатьевна Краснова; 12 May 1938 – 16 January 2014) was a Soviet and Russian plant operator. She worked as a foreman in a sewing workshop in the village of Yermolayevo before joining the Salavat garment factory as a seamstress. Krasnova worked in various roles at the Salavat Petrochemical Plant from 1960 to 1988. She was a deputy of the Supreme Soviet of Russia, a member of Central Auditing Commission of the Communist Party of the Soviet Union and a candidate member of the Central Committee of the Communist Party of the Soviet Union. Krasnova was awarded the Order of the Red Banner of Labour and the Order of Lenin with the title of Hero of Socialist Labour and the "Hammer and Sickle" gold medal.

== Early life ==
Krasnova was born in the village of Popovka, Birsky District, Bashkir Autonomous Soviet Socialist Republic (today Bashkortostan) on 12 May 1938. Her parents died when she was young and was brought up by her grandparents along with her large family. Krasnova passed nine grades of school and graduated from the Vocational school No. 19 in Ufa.

== Career ==
She moved to Salavat at age 19. Since 1957, Krasnova worked as a foreman in a sewing workshop in the village of Yermolayevo in the Kuyurgazinsky District. She moved to the Salavat garment factory in 1958 and worked as a seamstress. Krasnova remained at the factory until 1960. In the same year, she moved to the Salavat Petrochemical Plant and was an apprentice machinist from 1960 to 1961 before becoming a process pump operator in the urea shop between 1961 and 1970 and finally as an operator in the urea evaporation shop from 1971 to 1983. Krasnova increased the runtime of the pumps by 10% and minimised the time the unit was not in operation while also improving the quality of the work. She stopped working at the plant in 1988.

Krasnova became a member of the Communist Party of the Soviet Union in 1973. From 1975 to 1980, Krasnova was a deputy of the ninth convocation of the Supreme Soviet of Russia. She was elected a member of the Central Auditing Commission of the Communist Party of the Soviet Union by the 25th Congress of the Communist Party of the Soviet Union for its commission's 25th congress that sat from 1976 to 1981. Krasnova was a member of the Central Committee of the Communist Party of the Russian Federation from 1976 to 1981, and was a candidate member of the 26th congress of the Central Committee of the Communist Party of the Soviet Union as elected by the 26th Congress of the Communist Party of the Soviet Union from 1981 to 1986. She was elected to serve the Novostroevsky electoral district No. 113, Salavat as a member of the 11th convocation of the Supreme Soviet of the Bashkir Autonomous Soviet Socialist Republic and was the Deputy Chairman of the Supreme Soviet of the Bashkir Autonomous Soviet Socialist Republic. Krasnova was an elected deputy of the city and a member of the city party committee.

== Personal life ==
She was married to Gennady Pavlovich and they had two children. Krasnova died on 16 January 2014 and was buried at Cemetery No. 3 in Salavat.

== Recognition ==
She was awarded the Order of the Red Banner of Labour on 20 April 1971 and the Order of Lenin with the title of Hero of Socialist Labour and the "Hammer and Sickle" gold medal for her contribution to the development of the Salavat Petrochemical Plant on 16 June 1975.
