= Central Auditing Commission of the 24th Congress of the Communist Party of the Soviet Union =

This electoral term of the Central Auditing Commission was elected by the 24th Congress of the Communist Party of the Soviet Union in 1971, and was in session until the convocation of the 25th Congress in 1976.

== Composition ==
Members of the Central Auditing Commission of the 24th Congress of the Communist Party of the Soviet Union
Name	Cyrillic	23rd CAC	25th CAC	Birth	Death	PM	Nationality	Gender	Ref.
Andrey Alexandrov-Agentov	Андре́й Алекса́ндров-Аге́нтов	New	Not	1918	1993	1948	Russian	Male	
Mikhail Anikushin	Михаил Аникушин	Old	Not	1917	1997	1944	Russian	Male	
Sergey Antonov	Сергей Антонов	Old	CC	1911	1987	1937	Russian	Male	
Georgy Arbatov	Гео́ргий Арба́тов	New	CC	1923	2010	1943	Russian	Male	
Pyotr Belik	Пётр Белик	New	Reelected	1909	1980	1929	Ukrainian	Male	
Anatoly Berezin	Анатолий Березин	New	Not	1931	1998	1954	Russian	Male	
Klavdiy Bogolyubov	Клавдий Боголюбов	New	Reelected	1909	1996	1938	Russian	Male	
Viktor Bushuev	Виктор Бушуев	Old	Reelected	1919	1998	1947	Russian	Male	
Aleksandr Buznitsky	Анатолий Березин	New	Died	1911	1974	1932	Ukrainian	Male	
Evgeniy Cherednichenko	Евгений Чередниченко	Old	Not	1912	1986	1931	Russian	Male	
Viktor Churayev	Виктор Чураев	CC	Reelected	1904	1982	1929	Russian	Male	
Raisa Denisova	Раиса Денисова	New	Not	1926	2013	1963	Russian	Female	
Ivan Dmitriev	Иван Дмитриев	New	Reelected	1920	1992	1945	Russian	Male	
Anatoly Dodor	Анатолий Додор	New	Reelected	1939	2011	1966	Russian	Male	
David Dragunsky	Давид Драгунский	New	Reelected	1910	1992	1931	Jew	Male	
Giorgi Dzotsenidze	Георгий Дзоценидзе	Old	Not	1910	1976	1940	Georgian	Male	
Leonid Efremov	Леонид Ефремов	CC	Reelected	1921	2007	1941	Russian	Male	
Natalia Eliseeva	Наталия Елисеева	New	Not	1927	2015	1954	Russian	Female	
Vasily Golubev	Василий Голубев	New	Reelected	1913	1992	1940	Russian	Male	
Filipp Gorbach	Филипп Горбач	New	Not	1929	?	1965	Belarusian	Male	
Alexey Gorchakov	Алексей Горчаков	New	Died	1908	1974	1939	Russian	Male	
Alexei Goreglyad	Алексей Горегляд	Old	Not	1905	1986	1947	Belarusian	Male	
Alexander Gorkin	Александр Горкин	Old	Not	1897	1988	1916	Russian	Male	
Boris Gostev	Борис Гостев	New	CC	1927	2015	1954	Russian	Male	
Nagush Harutyunyan	Нагуш Арутюнян	Old	Not	1912	1993	1942	Armenian	Male	
Mustahim Iksanov	Мустахим Иксанов	New	CC	1926	1991	1951	Kazakh	Male	
Dmitry Kachin	Дмитрий Качин	New	CC	1929	2025	1953	Russian	Male	
Mikhail Khaldeev	Михаил Халдеев	Old	Reelected	1912	2016	1947	Russian	Male	
Gurban Khalilov	Курбан Халилов	New	Reelected	1906	2000	1926	Azerbaijani	Male	
Valery Kharazov	Валерий Харазов	New	CC	1918	2013	1944	Russian	Male	
Tikhon Khrennikov	Александр Трофимов	Old	CC	1913	2007	1947	Russian	Male	
Annamukhamed Klychev	Аннамухаммед Клычев	Old	Reelected	1912	?	1947	Turkmen	Male	
Mikhail Kobylchak	Михаил Кобыльчак	New	CC	1918	2004	1939	Ukrainian	Male	
Domna Komarova	Домна Комарова	Old	Reelected	1920	1994	1940	Russian	Female	
Nikolay Konovalov	Николай Коновалов	New	Died	1914	1971	1940	Belarusian	Male	
Ivan Kostyukov	Иван Костюков	New	Reelected	1926	2001	1951	Russian	Male	
Zinaida Kruglova	Зинаида Круглова	Old	CC	1923	1995	1944	Russian	Female	
Shaimardan Kudratov	Шаймардан Кудратов	New	Not	1933	Alive	1962	Uzbek	Male	
Turabay Kulatov	Турабай Кулатов	Old	Reelected	1908	1984	1932	Kyrgyz	Male	
Lev Kulidzhanov	Лев Кулиджанов	Old	CC	1924	2002	1931	Armenian	Male	
Elizar Kuskov	Елизар Кусков	New	Not	1918	1980	1939	Russian	Male	
Konstantin Lebedev	Константин Лебедев	New	CC	1918	2006	1941	Russian	Male	
Vladimir Lobanok	Владимир Лобанок	Old	Not	1907	1984	1930	Belarusian	Male	
Galina Lotsmanova	Галина Лоцманова	New	Reelected	1944	Alive	1967	Russian	Female	
Zoya Melnikova	Зоя Мельникова	New	Not	1931	2017	1967	Russian	Female	
Vladimir Mikulich	Владимир Микулич	Old	CC	1920	2000	1943	Belarusian	Male	
Zholseit Moldasanov	Жолсеит Молдасанов	New	Reelected	1930	2015	1959	Kazakh	Male	
Yefim Novoselov	Ефим Новосёлов	Old	CC	1906	1990	1925	Ukrainian	Male	
Timofey Osetrov	Тимофей Осётров	New	Reelected	1920	2018	1947	Russian	Male	
Sergey Pavlov	Сергей Павлов	CC	Reelected	1929	1993	1954	Russian	Male	
Vladimir Peller	Владимир Пеллер	New	Not	1913	1978	1947	Jew	Male	
Pyotr Pigalev	Пётр Пигалев	Old	Not	1911	1975	1931	Russian	Male	
Ergash Pulatov	Наталия Елисеева	New	Not	1940	Alive	1965	Uzbek	Male	
Oleg Rakhmanin	Иосиф Шикин	New	CC	1924	2010	1945	Russian	Male	
Aleksey Rumyantsev	Алексей Румянцев	Old	Reelected	1919	2008	1940	Russian	Male	
Nikita Ryzhov	Никита Рыжов	Old	Reelected	1907	1996	1928	Russian	Male	
Ilya Shcherbakov	Илья Щербаков	Old	Reelected	1912	1996	1937	Russian	Male	
Leonid Shevchenko	Леонид Шевченко	New	Died	1913	1972	1939	Russian	Male	
Iosif Shikin	Иосиф Шикин	Old	Died	1906	1973	1927	Russian	Male	
Ivan Shkuratov	Иван Шкуратов	New	Reelected	1913	1994	1943	Russian	Male	
Kirill Simonov	Кирилл Симонов	Old	Reelected	1917	1994	1943	Russian	Male	
Gennady Sizov	Геннадий Сизов	Old	Reelected	1903	1991	1926	Russian	Male	
Mikhail Smirnovsky	Михаил Смирновский	Old	Not	1921	1989	1947	Russian	Male	
Mikhail Smirtyukov	Михаил Смиртюков	New	CC	1909	2004	1940	Russian	Male	
Anastasia Sonygina	Анастасия Соныгина	New	Reelected	1924	?	1946	Russian	Female	
Vladimir Starovsky	Владимир Старовский	Old	Died	1905	1975	1939	Komi	Male	
Nikolay Sudarikov	Николай Судариков	New	Not	1913	2000	1939	Russian	Male	
Lyubov Sysoeva	Любовь Сысоева	Old	Not	1940	Alive	1961	Russian	Female	
Georgy Ter-Gazaryants	Георгий Тер-Газарянц	Old	Not	1923	Alive	1942	Azerbaijani	Male	
Vladimir Terebilov	Владимир Теребилов	New	CC	1916	2004	1940	Russian	Male	
Nikolay Timofeev	Николай Тимофеев	Old	CC	1913	1988	1943	Russian	Male	
Georgy Tsinev	Георгий Цинёв	New	CC	1907	1996	1932	Ukrainian	Male	
Vasily Uvachan	Василий Увачан	Old	Reelected	1917	1988	1940	Evenk	Male	
Semyon Vasyagin	Семён Васягин	Old	Reelected	1910	1991	1932	Russian	Male	
Alexander Yakovlev	Алекса́ндр Я́ковлев	New	Not	1923	2005	1944	Russian	Male	
Ivan Yastrebov	Иван Ястребов	New	Reelected	1911	2002	1941	Russian	Male	
Vadim Zagladin	Вадим Загладин	New	CC	1927	2006	1955	Russian	Male	
Nikolai Zakolupin	Николай Заколупин	New	Died	1920	1975	1942	Russian	Male	
Leonid Zamyatin	Леонид Замятин	New	CC	1922	2019	1944	Russian	Male	
Vladimir Zatvornitsky	Владимир Затворницкий	New	Reelected	1929	2017	1958	Russian	Male	
Yuri Zhukov	Георгий Жуков	Old	CC	1908	1991	1943	Russian	Male	
