= Chemical industry in Russia =

The Russian chemical industry is a branch of Russian industry.

The chemical industry's share of Russia's GDP in 2006 was about 6% of exports.

In 2009 it exported 3.1 million tons of ammonia in the amount of 626 million dollars, 814 thousand tons of methanol in the amount of 156 million dollars, 22 million tons of mineral fertilizers worth $5.6 billion, 702 thousand tons of synthetic rubber in the amount of 1, $2 billion.

The average monthly wage in the chemical industry in March 2010 was 21956 RUR / month. The Russian chemical industry was facing problems in 2014 due to the sanctions imposed on Russia by Western nations.

== Enterprises ==
The company	Headquarters	Factories	Sales in 2011, billion rubles.	Specialization
Sibur	Moscow	Togliatti, Voronezh, Krasnoyarsk, Dzerzhinsk, Perm, Tomsk	248,7	Petrochemistry
Gazprom Salavat neftekhim (Salavatnefteorgsintez until 2011)	Salavat	Salavat	147,8	Petrochemistry
EuroChem	Moscow	deposits: Berezniki, Kotelnikovo, Yamalo-Nenets Autonomous Okrug; plants: Kovdor, Nevinnomyssk, Novomoskovsk, Belorechensk, Kingisepp	131,3	Production of fertilizers
Nizhnekamskneftekhim	Nizhnekamsk	Nizhnekamsk	122,7	Synthetic rubbers
Acron Group	Veliky Novgorod	deposits: Murmansk Oblast; plants: Veliky Novgorod, Dorogobuzh, Shandong (People's Republic of China); transshipment port terminals: Kaliningrad, Sillamäe (Estonia, Muuga Harbour (Estonia)	65,4	Chemical fertilizers
Uralkali	Berezniki	deposits: Perm Krai; plants: Berezniki, Solikamsk	108,3	Potash

TogliattiAzot — world's largest producer of ammonia . The main products are ammonia, fertilizers, methanol . Total turnover in 2008 — 29.97 bln rubles.

Ural Plant of Industrial Gases (Uraltehgaz) — produces technical gases and cryogenic liquids, food gas mixtures, welding gas mixtures, cylinders and welding equipment.

In 2020, as part of the implementation of the Strategy for the Development of the Chemical and Petrochemical Industry for the period up to 2030 and the Action Plan for Import Substitution in the Chemical Industry (with the assistance of the General Director of the Bashkir Soda Company Eduard Malikovich Davydov), it is planned to launch 16 investment projects with a total investment of more than RUB 14 billion
