= Central Auditing Commission of the 25th Congress of the Communist Party of the Soviet Union =

This electoral term of the Central Auditing Commission was elected by the 25th Congress of the Communist Party of the Soviet Union in 1976, and was in session until the convocation of the 26th Congress in 1981.

== Composition ==
Members of the Central Auditing Commission of the 25th Congress of the Communist Party of the Soviet Union
Name	Cyrillic	24th CAC	26th CAC	Birth	Death	PM	Nationality	Gender	Ref.
Alexander Aleksankin	Александр Алексанкин	New	Reelected	1929	2014	1956	Belarusian	Male	
Grigory Arzumanyan	Григорий Арзуманян	New	Died	1919	1976	1944	Armenian	Male	
Antanas Barkauskas	Антанас Баркаускас	New	CC	1917	1999	1942	Lithuanian	Male	
Boris Batsanov	Борис Бацанов	New	Reelected	1927	2005	1951	Russian	Male	
Pyotr Belik	Пётр Белик	Old	Died	1909	1980	1929	Ukrainian	Male	
Anatoly Blatov	Анато́лий Бла́тов	New	CC	1914	1988	1940	Russian	Male	
Ratmir Bobovikov	Ратмир Бобовиков	New	CC	1927	2002	1947	Russian	Male	
Boris Bochkov	Борис Бочков	New	Not	1924	1991	1950	Russian	Male	
Klavdiy Bogolyubov	Клавдий Боголюбов	Old	Not	1909	1996	1938	Russian	Male	
Vera Bulova	Вера Булова	New	Not	1941	2005	1964	Belarusian	Female	
Viktor Bushuev	Виктор Бушуев	Old	Not	1919	1998	1947	Russian	Male	
Vasily Cherdintsev	Василий Чердинцев	New	CC	1927	2018	1956	Russian	Male	
Anatoly Chernyaev	Анато́лий Черня́ев	New	CC	1921	2017	1942	Russian	Male	
Viktor Churayev	Виктор Чураев	Old	Not	1904	1982	1929	Russian	Male	
Yuri Churbanov	Ю́рий Чурба́нов	New	CC	1936	2013	1960	Russian	Male	
Ekaterina Demidova	Екатерина Демидова	New	Reelected	1940	2018	1967	Russian	Female	
Ivan Dmitriev	Иван Дмитриев	Old	Not	1920	1992	1945	Russian	Male	
Anatoly Dodor	Анатолий Додор	Old	Not	1939	2011	1966	Russian	Male	
David Dragunsky	Давид Драгунский	Old	Reelected	1910	1992	1931	Jew	Male	
Leonid Efremov	Леонид Ефремов	Old	Reelected	1921	2007	1941	Russian	Male	
Valentin Falin	Baлeнтин Фaлин	New	Reelected	1926	2018	1953	Russian	Male	
Viktor Filimonov	Ви́ктор Филимо́нов	New	Not	1940	2012	1952	Russian	Male	
Stepan Ermolaev	Степан Ермолаев	New	Not	1929	2006	1952	Russian	Male	
Pavel Gilashvili	Павел Гилашвили	New	Reelected	1918	1994	1939	Georgian	Male	
Nikolai Glushkov	Николай Глушков	New	Reelected	1918	1999	1945	Russian	Male	
Vasily Golubev	Василий Голубев	Old	Reelected	1913	1992	1940	Russian	Male	
Tamara Golubtsova	Тамара Голубцова	New	Reelected	1928	2001	1954	Russian	Male	
Alexei Gordienko	Алексей Гордиенко	New	CC	1929	2010	1957	Ukrainian	Male	
Vera Gorozhaeva	Раиса Горожаева	New	Not	1928	2011	1960	Russian	Female	
Leonid Ilyichev	Леонид Ильичёв	Comeback	CC	1906	1990	1924	Russian	Male	
Sattar Imashev	Саттар Имашев	New	CC	1925	1984	1945	Kazakh	Male	
Leonid Kazakov	Леонид Казаков	New	CC	1951	Alive	1974	Russian	Male	
Mikhail Khaldeev	Михаил Халдеев	Old	Reelected	1912	2016	1947	Russian	Male	
Gurban Khalilov	Курбан Халилов	Old	Reelected	1906	2000	1926	Azerbaijani	Male	
Alexander Kharlamov	Леонид Клёцков	New	Reelected	1929	2004	1952	Russian	Male	
Rem Khokhlov	Рем Хохлов	New	Died	1926	1977	1971	Russian	Male	
Leonid Kletskov	Леонид Клёцков	New	Not	1918	1997	1940	Belarusian	Male	
Annamukhamed Klychev	Аннамухаммед Клычев	Old	Not	1912	?	1947	Turkmen	Male	
Domna Komarova	Домна Комарова	Old	Reelected	1920	1994	1940	Russian	Female	
Veniamin Konnov	Вениамин Коннов	New	Reelected	1921	1991	1946	Russian	Male	
Vadim Kortunov	Вадим Кортунов	New	Not	1918	1995	1944	Russian	Male	
Ivan Kostyukov	Иван Костюков	Old	Reelected	1926	2001	1951	Russian	Male	
Zoya Krasnova	Зоя Краснова	New	CC	1938	2014	1973	Russian	Female	
Turabay Kulatov	Турабай Кулатов	Old	Not	1908	1984	1932	Kyrgyz	Male	
Vera Lebedeva	Вера Лебедева	New	CC	1937	?	1969	Russian	Female	
Galina Lotsmanova	Галина Лоцманова	Old	Reelected	1944	Alive	1967	Russian	Female	
Alexei Lukovets	Алексей Луковец	New	Died	1921	1977	1967	Russian	Male	
Nikolai Lunkov	Николай Луньков	New	CC	1919	2021	1940	Russian	Male	
Ivan Mednikov	Иван Медников	New	Not	1917	2001	1940	Russian	Male	
Vadim Medvedev	вадим медведев	New	Reelected	1929	2025	1952	Russian	Male	
Afanasy Melnichenko	Афанасий Мельниченко	New	Reelected	1923	2008	1943	Ukrainian	Male	
Vladimir Mitskevich	Владимир Мицкевич	New	Reelected	1920	1983	1944	Belarusian	Male	
Fyodor Mochalin	Фёдор Мочалин	New	CC	1930	2015	1959	Russian	Male	
Zholseit Moldasanov	Жолсеит Молдасанов	Old	Not	1930	2015	1959	Kazakh	Male	
Nikolai Morozov	Никола́й Моро́зов	New	CC	1929	2012	1953	Russian	Male	
Ivan Mozgovoy	Иван Мозговой	New	CC	1927	2005	1951	Belarusian	Male	
Mahmud Muydinov	Махмуд Муйдинов	New	Not	1939	Alive	1970	Uzbek	Male	
Rahmon Nabiyev	Рахмон Набиев	New	Reelected	1930	1993	1960	Tajik	Male	
Zoya Novozhilova	Зоя Новожилова	New	Not	1943	Alive	1964	Russian	Female	
Timofey Osetrov	Тимофей Осётров	Old	Reelected	1920	2018	1947	Russian	Male	
Yuri Ovchinnikov	Юрий Овчинников	New	CC	1934	1988	1962	Russian	Male	
Sergey Pavlov	Сергей Павлов	Old	Reelected	1929	1993	1954	Russian	Male	
Nikolay Popov	Николай Попов	New	CC	1931	2008	1960	Russian	Male	
Yevgeny Razumov	Евгений Разумов	New	CC	1919	2017	1942	Russian	Male	
Aleksey Rumyantsev	Алексей Румянцев	Old	Reelected	1919	2008	1940	Russian	Male	
Galina Rybakova	Вера Булова	New	Not	1939	2018	1960	Russian	Female	
Nikita Ryzhov	Никита Рыжов	Old	Reelected	1907	1996	1928	Russian	Male	
Babken Sarkisov	Бабкен Саркисов	New	CC	1913	1999	1939	Armenian	Male	
Alevtina Serova	Алевтина Серова	New	Not	1938	?	1965	Russian	Female	
Lev Shapiro	Лев Шапиро	New	CC	1927	2021	1959	Jew	Male	
Ilya Shcherbakov	Илья Щербаков	Old	Reelected	1912	1996	1937	Russian	Male	
Ivan Shkuratov	Иван Шкуратов	Old	Reelected	1913	1994	1943	Russian	Male	
Kirill Simonov	Кирилл Симонов	Old	Not	1917	1994	1943	Russian	Male	
Konstantin Simonov	Константин Симонов	Comeback	Died	1915	1979	1942	Russian	Male	
Gennady Sizov	Геннадий Сизов	Old	Reelected	1903	1991	1926	Russian	Male	
Anastasia Sonygina	Анастасия Соныгина	Old	Not	1924	?	1946	Russian	Female	
Pyotr Strautmanis	Пётр Страутманис	New	Reelected	1919	2007	1944	Latvian	Male	
Vasily Tur	Василий Тур	New	Not	1919	1986	1948	Ukrainian	Male	
Mikhail Ulyanov	Михаил Ульянов	New	Reelected	1927	2007	1951	Russian	Male	
Maksudakhan Umarova	Алевтина Серова	New	Not	1923	?	1945	Uzbek	Female	
Vasily Uvachan	Василий Увачан	Old	Not	1917	1988	1940	Evenk	Male	
Semyon Vasyagin	Пётр Страутманис	Old	Not	1910	1991	1932	Ukrainian	Male	
Ivan Yastrebov	Иван Ястребов	Old	Not	1911	2002	1941	Russian	Male	
Bally Yazkuliev	Баллы Язкулиев	New	CC	1930	?	1953	Turkmen	Male	
Vladimir Zatvornitsky	Владимир Затворницкий	Old	Not	1929	2017	1958	Russian	Male	
