= Chairperson of the Presidium of the Supreme Soviet of the Azerbaijan Soviet Socialist Republic =

The Chairperson of the Presidium of the Supreme Soviet of the Azerbaijan Soviet Socialist Republic was the nominal head of state of Soviet Azerbaijan, which existed between 21 July 1938 and 18 May 1990. It succeeded the office of Speaker of the Parliament of the Azerbaijan Democratic Republic. Below is a table of the Chairperson of the Presidium of the Supreme Soviet of the Azerbaijan SSR.

| No. | Picture | Name (Birth–Death) | Took office | Left office | Political party |
Chairperson of the Presidium of the Supreme Soviet
| 1 | | Mir Bashir Gasimov (1879–1949) | 21 July 1938 | 23 April 1949 | CPSU |
| 2 | | Nazar Heydarov (1896–1968) | 18 May 1949 | 9 March 1954 | CPSU |
| 3 | | Mirza Ibrahimov (1911–1993) | 9 March 1954 | 23 January 1958 | CPSU |
| 4 | | Ilyas Abdullayev (1913–1985) | 23 January 1958 | 25 November 1959 | CPSU |
| 5 | | Saftar Jafarov (1900–1961) | 25 November 1959 | 16 November 1961 | CPSU |
| 6 | | Mamed Iskenderov (1914–1985) | 29 December 1961 | 25 December 1969 | CPSU |
| 7 | | Gurban Khalilov (1906–2000) | 25 December 1969 | 30 December 1985 | CPSU |
| 8 | | Suleyman Tatliyev (1925–2014) | 30 December 1985 | 22 June 1989 | CPSU |
| 9 | | Elmira Gafarova (1934–1993) | 22 June 1989 | 18 May 1990 | CPSU |

On 18 May 1990 the Presidium of the Supreme Soviet was abolished. The position of head of state went to the President of the Azerbaijan SSR, Ayaz Mutallibov.

== See also ==
- Supreme Soviet of the Azerbaijan Soviet Socialist Republic
- Chairman of the Supreme Soviet of the Azerbaijan Soviet Socialist Republic
- President of the Azerbaijan Soviet Socialist Republic
- List of heads of state of Azerbaijan

== Sources ==
- World Statesmen.org: Azerbaijan
