= Asgar Abdullayev =

Asgar Abdullayev may refer to:

- Asgar Abdullayev (footballer) (born 1960)
- Asgar Abdullayev (scientist) (1927–1998)
