= Yemashevo =

Yemashevo Емашево
- Selo
- Location within Bashkortostan Location within Russia
- Coordinates: 55°21′N 55°54′E
- Country: Russia
- Region: Bashkortostan
- District: Birsky District
- Time zone: UTC+5:00

Yemashevo (Russian: Емашево; Bashkir: Ямаш, Yamaş) is a rural locality (a selo) in Osinovsky Selsoviet, Birsky District, Bashkortostan, Russia. The population was 148 as of 2010. There are 8 streets. Is the birthplace of Zekeria Aknazarov.

== Geography ==
Yemashevo is located 27 km east of Birsk (the district's administrative centre) by road. Lezhebokovo is the nearest rural locality.
