= 27th Congress of the Communist Party of the Soviet Union =

1986 meeting of Soviet delegates

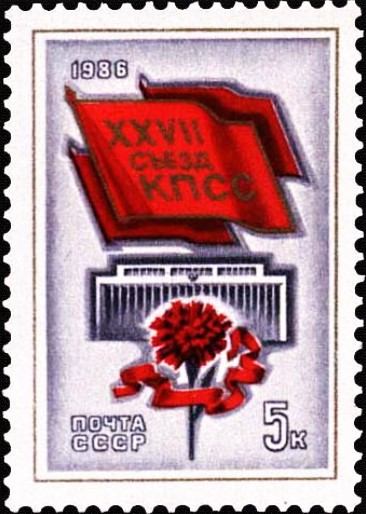
1986 USSR Postal Stamp, celebrating the 27th Congress

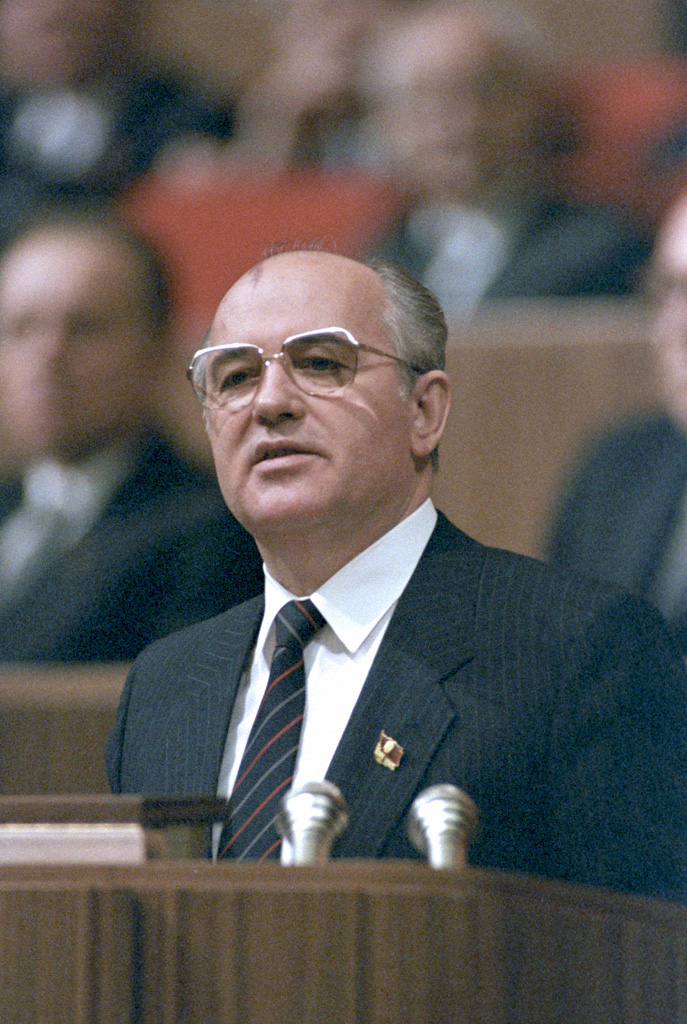
Gorbachev's ending speech to the 27th Congress

The 27th Congress of the Communist Party of the Soviet Union was held from 25 February to 6 March 1986 in Moscow. This was the first congress presided over by Mikhail Gorbachev as General Secretary of the Central Committee of the CPSU. In accordance with the pattern set 20 years earlier by Leonid Brezhnev, the congress occurred five years after the previous CPSU Congress. Much had changed in those five years. Key figures of Soviet politics, Mikhail Suslov, Leonid Brezhnev, Yuri Andropov, Dmitriy Ustinov, and Konstantin Chernenko had died, and Mikhail Gorbachev had become General Secretary of the Party. For this reason the congress was widely anticipated, both at home and abroad, as an indicator of Gorbachev's new policies and directions. The congress was attended by 4993 delegates. It elected the Central Committee of the 27th term.

During his political report, Gorbachev talked about Glastnost and the People's Socialist Self-government (Narodnoe samo-upravlenie).

The agenda of the congress:

1. Political Report of the CPSU Central Committee of the 26th Congress
2. On the revised programme of the CPSU
3. On the revised rules of the CPSU
4. Report of the CPSU Central Auditing Commission of the 26th Congress
5. Guidelines for the Economic and Social Development of the USSR for 1986-1990 and for the Period Ending in 2000
6. Elections of the central party organs
  1. Central Committee of the 27th Congress
  2. Central Auditing Commission of the 27th Congress
