= Saftar Jafarov =

Azerbaijani politician

- Səftər Cəfərov
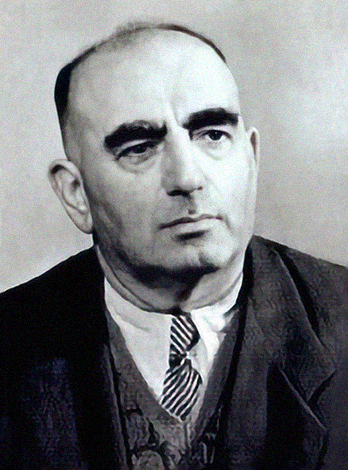

Chairman of the Presidium of the Supreme Soviet of the Azerbaijan SSR
- In office 26 November 1959 – 16 November 1961
- Preceded by: Ilyas Abdullayev
- Succeeded by: Mammad Isgandarov

Chairman of the Central Executive Committee of the Nakhchivan ASSR
- In office 1937–1937

Personal details
- Born: 1900 Pirshagi, Baku Uyezd, Baku Governorate, Russian Empire
- Died: 16 November 1961 (aged 60–61) Baku, Azerbaijan SSR, USSR
- Party: CPSU
- Awards: Order of Lenin Order of the Red Banner of Labour

Saftar Mammad oghlu Jafarov (Azerbaijani: Səftər Məmməd oğlu Cəfərov; 1900 – 16 November 1961) was an Azerbaijani politician, Chairman of the Presidium of the Supreme Soviet of Azerbaijan SSR (1959–1961).

== Biography ==
Saftar Jafarov was born in 1900 in Pirshagi village of Baku Uyezd to a peasant family. He started working for private entrepreneurs at the age of 15. During those years he joined the labor movement.

In April 1920, when the Soviet government was established in Azerbaijan, Saftar Jafarov joined the Red Army, and in October of that year he became a member of the Communist Party of the Soviet Union. He served in the Red Army until 1932, rising from an ordinary soldier to a political worker. He was a military commissar of the battalion and regiment, assistant to the chief of staff of the division on political issues, and then military prosecutor of the Second Caucasian İnfantry Division and the Caspian Navy named after Styopin.

From 1932 to 1935 he worked as prosecutor of the Azerbaijan SSR, and from 1933 as a People's Commissar of Justice of the Azerbaijan SSR. Later he was chairman of the Central Executive Committee of the Nakhchivan Autonomous Soviet Socialist Republic, permanent representative of the Azerbaijani SSR under the Council of People's Commissars of the Soviet Union in Moscow, and in October 1940 he was appointed People's Commissar of Land of the Azerbaijan SSR.

Saftar Jafarov was elected Secretary of the Presidium of the Supreme Soviet of Azerbaijan SSR in early 1947, Deputy Chairman in 1957, and chairman in November 1959. From 1959 he was a member of the political bureau of the Central Committee of the Communist Party of Azerbaijan.

Saftar Jafarov was a representative of the 22nd Congress of the Communist Party of the Soviet Union and the 19th–25th Congresses of the Communist Party of Azerbaijan. At the 22nd Congress of the CPSU, he was elected a member of the Central Audit Commission of the CPSU. He also was a deputy of the Supreme Soviet of the Azerbaijan SSR of 1–5 convocations.

Saftar Jafarov died of cardiovascular disease in Baku on November 16, 1961. He was buried in the Alley of Honor on November 19.
