= Bakhshali Bakhshaliyev =

Soviet Azerbaijani bureaucrat (1920–1987)

- Baxşəli Baxşəliyev

Minister of Minister of Finance of the Azerbaijan SSR
- In office 20 August 1970 – 13 October 1987
- Preceded by: Gurban Khalilov
- Succeeded by: Badir Garayev

First Deputy Minister of Finance of the Azerbaijan SSR
- In office 1968–1970

Personal details
- Born: 20 August 1920; Barda, Azerbaijan
- Died: 12 November 1987 (aged 67); Baku, Azerbaijan SSR, Soviet Union
- Political party: Communist Party of the Soviet Union
- Children: Govhar Bakhshaliyeva
- Awards: Order of the Red Banner of Labour Order of the Badge of Honour Honored Economist of the Azerbaijan SSR

Bakhshali Hasanali oghlu Bakhshaliyev (Azerbaijani: Baxşəli Həsənəli oğlu Baxşəliyev, 20 August 1920 — 12 November 1987) was a Soviet Azerbaijani bureaucrat who served as Minister of Finance of the Azerbaijan SSR from 1970 to 1987.

== Biography ==
Bakhshali Hasanali oglu Bakhshaliyev was born on 20 August 1920, in the city of Barda. He began his career here in 1937 as a high school librarian. Since 1940, he worked as the chief inspector, chief accountant of the district finance department, supervisor-inspector of the control-inspection department in Barda District. He received his higher education at the All-Union Correspondence Financial Institute.

In 1954, Bakhshali Bakhshaliyev was transferred to the position of chief inspector-inspector of the central office of the Ministry of Finance of the Azerbaijan SSR, and then he became the head of the department of the control-inspection department. In 1961-1968 he worked as the head of the Main Department of State Insurance of the Azerbaijan SSR. In 1968, he was promoted to the post of First Deputy Minister of Finance of the Azerbaijan SSR. Bakhshali Bakhshaliyev was the Minister of Finance of the Azerbaijan SSR from 1970 to 1987.

Bakhshali Bakhshaliyev was a deputy of the Supreme Soviet of the Azerbaijan SSR of the 8th-11th convocation and was elected a member of the Central Committee of the Azerbaijan Communist Party at the XXVIII, XXIX, XXX and XXXI congresses of the Azerbaijan Communist Party. He was twice awarded the Order of the Red Banner of Labor, as well as the Orders of Friendship of Peoples, the Badge of Honor and the USSR Medal, and was awarded the honorary title of Honored Economist of the Azerbaijan SSR.

Bakhshali Bakhshaliyev died on 12 November 1987 in Baku.
