= Eyvazlı, Qubadli =

Eyvazlı
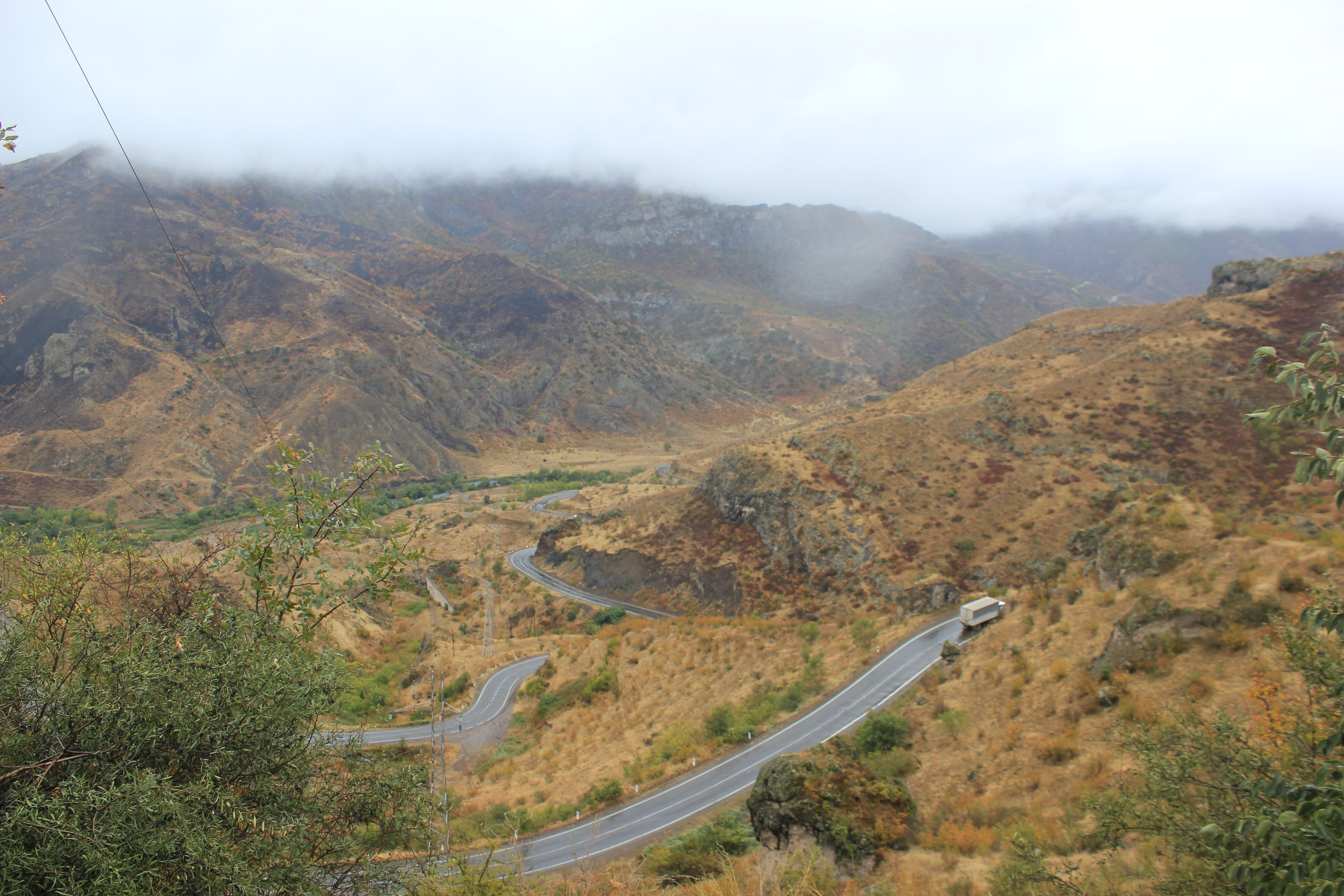

- Location within Azerbaijan
- Coordinates: 39°25′58″N 46°23′55″E
- Country: Azerbaijan
- District: Qubadli
- Time zone: UTC+4 (AZT)
  - Summer (DST): UTC+5 (AZT)

Eyvazlı (Eyvazly) is a village in the Qubadli District of Azerbaijan. The European route E117, specifically the section between the Armenian cities of Goris and Kapan, passes through the village.

== Notable natives ==
- Valeh Barshadly — the first Minister of Defense of Azerbaijan after restoration of its independence in 1991.
- Mammad Isgandarov — chairman of the Council of Ministers of Azerbaijan SSR (1959–1961), Chairman of the Presidium of the Supreme Soviet of Azerbaijan SSR (1961–1969).
- Asgar Abdullayev — Soviet and Azerbaijani electrical engineer, scientist, doctor of technical sciences (1969), the USSR State Prize laureate (1969), professor of the Academy of Sciences of the Azerbaijan SSR (1970).
