= Popovka, Republic of Bashkortostan =

Popovka Поповка
- Village
- Location within Bashkortostan Location within Russia
- Coordinates: 55°26′N 55°26′E
- Country: Russia
- Region: Bashkortostan
- District: Birsky District
- Time zone: UTC+5:00

Popovka (Russian: Поповка) is a rural locality (a village) in Kusekeyevsky Selsoviet, Birsky District, Bashkortostan, Russia. The population was 33 as of 2010. There are 3 streets.

== Geography ==
Popovka is located 15 km northwest of Birsk (the district's administrative centre) by road. Shamsutdin is the nearest rural locality.
