= Zekeriya Aknazarov =

Soviet politician (1924–2000)

- Зәкәриә Аҡназаров; Зекерия Акназаров

Chairman of the Council of Ministers of the Bashkir ASSR
- In office 6 February 1962 – 8 January 1986
- Preceded by: Valey Nabiyullin
- Succeeded by: Marat Mirgazyamov

Personal details
- Born: 22 August 1924 Yamashevo, Bashkir ASSR, Russian SFSR, Soviet Union
- Died: 2 April 2000 (aged 64) Ufa, Bashkortostan, Russia
- Resting place: Muslim Cemetery, Ufa
- Party: Communist Party of the Soviet Union
- Education: Bashkir Pedagogical Institute

Zekeria Sharafutdinovich Aknazarov (Bashkir: Зәкәриә Шәрәфетдин улы Аҡназаров, romanized: Zəkəriə Şərəfetdin uly Aqnazarov, Russian: Зекерия Шарафутдинович Акназаров; 22 August 1924 – 2 April 2000) was a Soviet politician who was Chairman of the Council of Ministers of the Bashkir ASSR (1962–1986).

== Biography ==
Aknazarov was born on the Yamashevo farm in the Zilair canton of the Bashkir ASSR (now this village of the Baimak district of Bashkortostan does not exist), the eldest child in the family of the peasant Sharafutdin Gilyazhevich Aknazarov, who was engaged in the preparation of boards.

He graduated from Temyasov Pedagogical School in 1940. From 1941 to 1942 he worked as a teacher at the Murzeevskaya elementary school in the Baymaksky district of the Bashkir ASSR. On August 22, 1942, he was drafted into the army. He served in Ufa. Despite his numerous requests, he was not sent to the front.

Since 1946, he has been the second secretary of the Baymak RK VLKSM.

After the war he graduated from the Bashkir State Pedagogical Institute (now Bashkir State University) named after K. A. Timiryazev in 1950, GA at the Central Committee of the CPSU in 1962

From 1948 to 1954, instructor, deputy head of the department, secretary, second secretary. Since 1951, the first secretary of the Bashkir regional committee of the Komsomol. Post-graduate student of the Academy of Social Sciences under the Central Committee of the CPSU (1960–1962). He did not manage to defend his thesis, as he was urgently recalled.

From 1954 to 1962 - head of the department of party bodies of the Bashkir Regional Committee of the CPSU.

From February 1962 to January 1986 - Chairman of the Council of Ministers of the Bashkir ASSR.

Deputy of the Council of Nationalities of the Supreme Soviet of the USSR of 6-9 convocations (1962–1978) from the Bashkir ASSR. He was elected to the Supreme Soviet of the 9th convocation from the October electoral district No. 511 of the Bashkir ASSR, a member of the Commission on Transport and Communications of the Council of Nationalities. Deputy of the Supreme Soviet of the RSFSR and the Supreme Soviet of the BASSR. In 1966–1971 he was a member of the Central Auditing Commission of the CPSU.

In 1986 he retired.

On 2 April 2000, he died in Ufa. He was buried in the Muslim Cemetery. at the Gufran mosque next to his wife Fyodora Petrovna.

== Awards and honors ==
- Order of Lenin (twice: 1971, 1984)
- Order of the October Revolution (1981)
- Order of the Red Banner of Labour (twice: 1957, 1966)
- Order of Friendship of Peoples (1974)
- 10 USSR medals.

Memorial plaques were installed on the house number 71 on Kommunisticheskaya Street, where Aknazarov lived for a long time, as well as on the building of the administration of the Baymaksky region. In Ufa, Bakalinsky lane was renamed into Aknazarov Street. Streets in Sibay and Baymak are also named after him.

In August 1999, Aknazarov was awarded the title of "Honorary Citizen of the City of Ufa"
