= Musino =

Musino Мусино
- Village
- Location within Bashkortostan Location within Russia
- Coordinates: 53°44′N 54°21′E
- Country: Russia
- Region: Bashkortostan
- District: Bizhbulyaksky District
- Time zone: UTC+5:00

Musino (Russian: Мусино; Bashkir: Муса, Musa) is a rural locality (a village) in Bazlyksky Selsoviet, Bizhbulyaksky District, Bashkortostan, Russia. The population was 91 as of 2010. There is 1 street.

== Geography ==
Musino is located 15 km northeast of Bizhbulyak (the district's administrative centre) by road. Yegorovka is the nearest rural locality.
