= Gazprom Neftekhim Salavat =

Russian petrochemicals company headquartered in Salavat

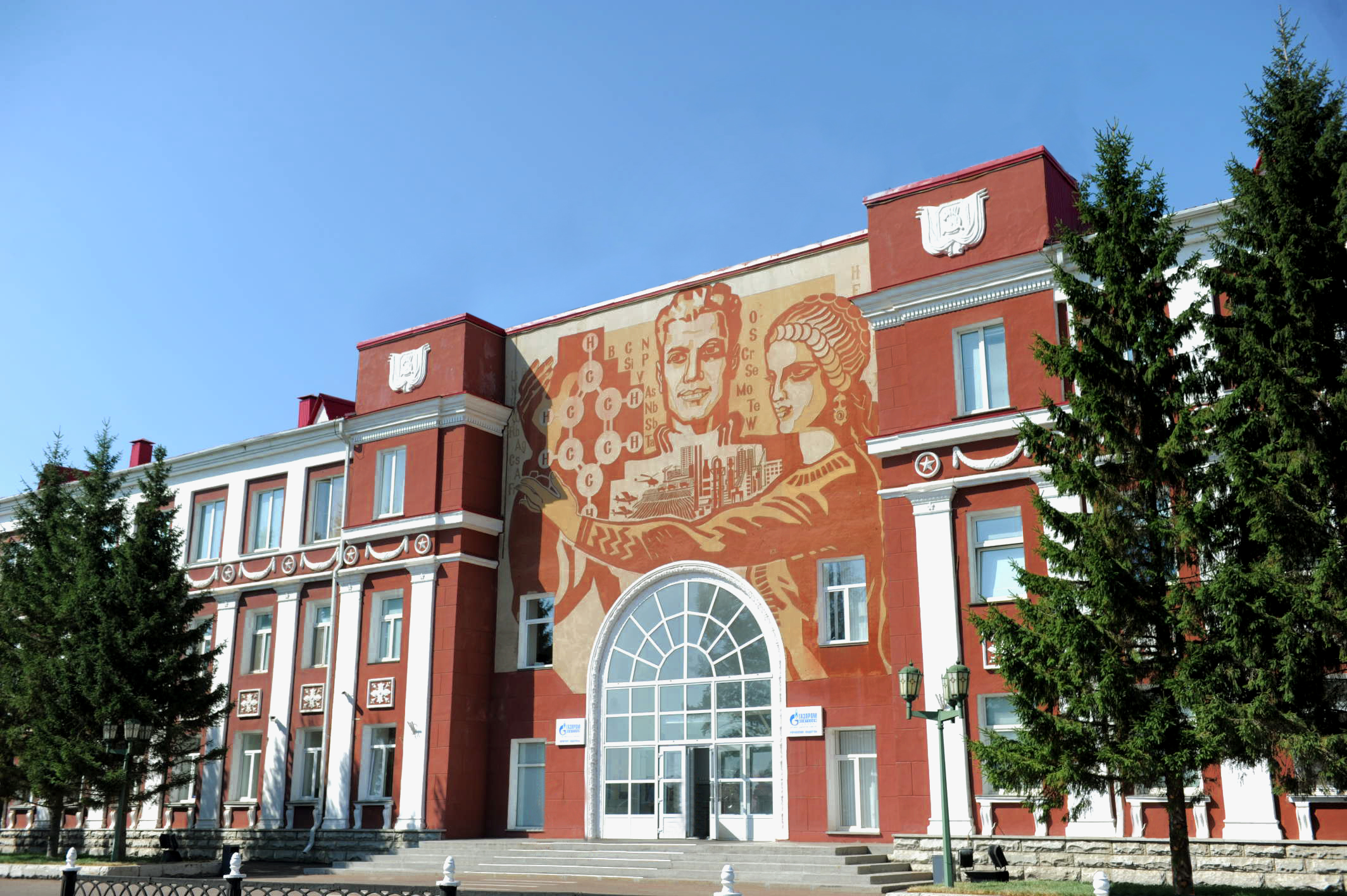
- Office of Gazprom Neftekhim Salavat in Salavat
- Native name: Газпром нéфтéхим Салават
- Type: Subsidiary
- Industry: Petrochemicals
- Predecessor: Salavatnefteorgsintez
- Founded: 1948; 78 years ago
- Headquarters: Salavat, Bashkortostan, Russia
- Area served: Worldwide
- Products: Petrochemicals; Petroleum products
- Revenue: ▲ ₽27.31 billion (2021)
- Net income: ▲ ₽29.26 billion (2021)
- Total assets: ▲ ₽210.32 billion (2021)
- Total equity: ▲ ₽124.75 billion (2021)
- Number of employees: 8,726 (2021)
- Parent: Gazprom
- Website: salavat-neftekhim.gazprom.ru

Gazprom Neftekhim Salavat (Russian: Газпром нéфтéхим Салават, IPA: [ɡɐsˈprom nʲɪftʲˈexim salavˈɑt]) is a Russian petrochemicals company headquartered in the city of Salavat in the Bashkortostan republic of Russia. The company specializes in the processing of hydrocarbons into approximately 150 different petrochemicals, fertilizers and petroleum products, such as gasoline and fuel oil.

As of 2025, the company controls three main plants in the city of Salavat, making it the largest petrochemical production complex in Russia. This includes an oil refinery and two other plants that produce monomers and gas-based chemicals.

In recent years, the complex has been attacked by Ukrainian drones following the Russian invasion of Ukraine in 2022, and has received criticism for its environmental record from the Federal Service for Supervision of Natural Resources. Until February 2011 the company was known as Salavatnefteorgsintez (Russian: Салаватнéфтéоргсинтéз, lit. 'Salvat Oil Organic Synthesis').

== History ==
Plans for a new hydrogenation plant, known as Plant No. 18, were originally conceived for the city of Chernogorsk in Khakassia. The construction of the new plant commenced in 1946, with most of the equipment for the new plant being appropriated from Germany at the end of the Second World War. After this equipment was transported to the city for reassembly, the government decided to relocate the plant to Bashkortostan in response to the rapid expansion of crude oil production in the region at the time. The plans to merge the hydrogenation plant with other oil refining facilities were approved by the Council of Ministers of the Soviet Union in January 1948. It was then approved by the government of the Bashkir Autonomous Soviet Socialist Republic, which specified the final location of the plant in the village of Bolshoy Allaguvat. The Council of Ministers of the Autonomous Republic also approved the construction of a new city for 25,000 inhabitants in the area surrounding the village of Musino.

Construction commenced in June 1948 after the Council of Ministers of the Soviet Union approved the final plans on March 30, 1948, and set production targets for the plant. This included work on the main chemical gas and hydrogenation plants, in addition to a thermal power station, a catalyst plant and other auxiliary facilities. The catalyst plant was the first of these facilities to enter operation in 1954, before the refinery entered service in 1955. Over the next two decades, the complex transformed into the largest petrochemical plant in the Soviet Union, with several new production units built to meet the demands of the eighth five-year plan. As a result, the plant produced significant quantities of ammonia, urea, styrene, butyl and fatty alcohols. This is as well as maintaining the capacity to process crude with a high sulfur content from local oil fields located to the north of Bashkortostan. The plant was then awarded the Order of Lenin for meeting its production targets.

By 1975, the plant had doubled its production of ammonia and urea within five years under the ninth five-year plan. To meet these targets, the urea and ammonia production facilities were reconstructed, and Salavat became the largest producer of fertilizer in the Soviet Union, manufacturing over one million tons per year. By the end of the decade, the plant had also started to produce ethylene, polystyrene and glycol. It adopted modern processes, such as catalytic reformation and hydrocracking, to increase production and by the mid-1980s, it was processing approximately one-quarter of all Bashkir crude, and all the condensate produced in Orenburg Oblast.

The expansion in production capacity continued until the dissolution of the Soviet Union, when the company was forced to halt the production of any products that were unprofitable. The economic crisis that affected the Russian Federation throughout the 1990s also forced the plant to shutter facilities due to a lack of both raw materials and customers. However, production began to increase again towards the end of the decade. By the beginning of the 21st century, the plant had begun a program of major investment, reconstructing and modernizing various facilities within the Salavat petrochemical complex. It included increasing the production of light petroleum products to three million tons per year, and the production of bitumen to three hundred thousand tons per year.

In January 2011, Salavatnefteorgsintez changed its name to Gazprom Neftekhim Salavat, taking the name of its majority shareholder. The company was listed on the MICEX stock exchange until May 30, 2014, when Gazprom initiated a full takeover at 5,380 rubles per share. It was then reorganized in 2016 as a limited liability company within the same ownership group. Previously, Gazprom Pererabotka (Russian: Газпром Пéрéработка, lit. 'Gazprom Refining') held a 99.9999999978% stake in the company, but Gazprom Dobycha Tambey (Russian: Газпром добыча Тамбéй, lit. 'Gazprom production Tambey') became the sole owner of the plant on August 29, 2025.

Before the Russian invasion of Ukraine, the plant shipped petroleum and petrochemical products to every federal district of Russia. Salavat also exported its products to approximately thirty countries within Europe and the Commonwealth of Independent States, including large quantities to Germany, Poland, the Netherlands, the United Kingdom, and Kazakhstan. In 2023, Gazprom Neftekhim Salavat was sanctioned by the Ukrainian Government and reported a 46% decline in profits at the end of that year. In both 2023 and 2024, the company continued to receive criticism and penalties for breaching pollution limits.

The complex was attacked by a Ukrainian drone on May 9, 2024, which had travelled 930 miles to hit the site. It was claimed that the refinery had continued to operate as normal despite the strike, although Reuters reported that the catalytic cracking unit had stopped production. In response, the Head of the Republic of Bashkortostan, Radiy Khabirov, said that air defences would be strengthened to protect "enterprises that are critical for the economy of the Republic (of Bashkortostan)."

On 18 September 2025 the facility was hit by another Ukrainian drone. The ELOU-AVT-4 primary oil refining unit was hit and damaged, a unit that alone handles approximately 4 million tons annually, of Neftekhim Salavat's 10 million tons in total capacity. Less than a week later, on 24 September, the facility was hit again by Ukrainian drones.

On 14 July 2026, Ukraine's General Staff reported another attack on the refinery. A fire was reported at the facility damaging the AVT-6 primary crude oil distillation unit and other production facilities.

== Gallery ==
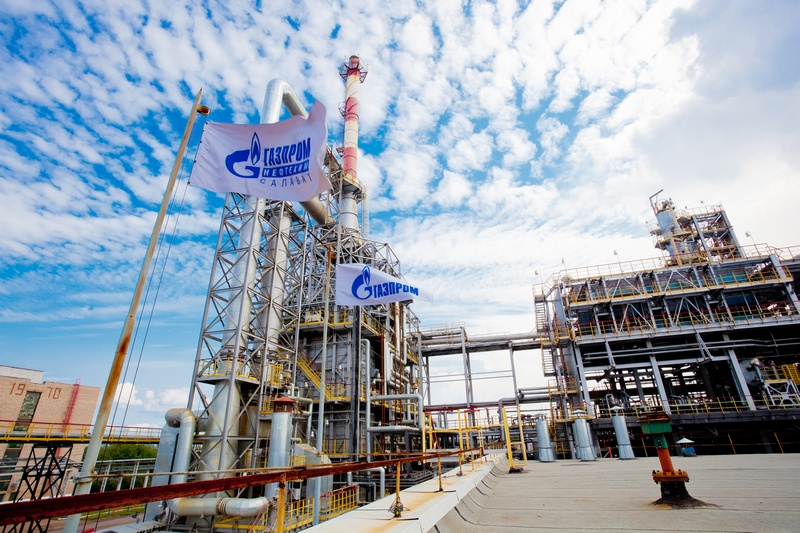

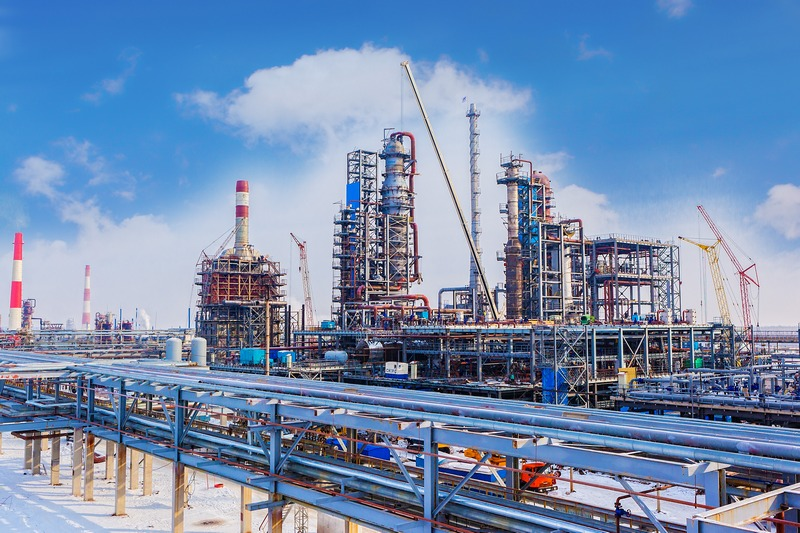

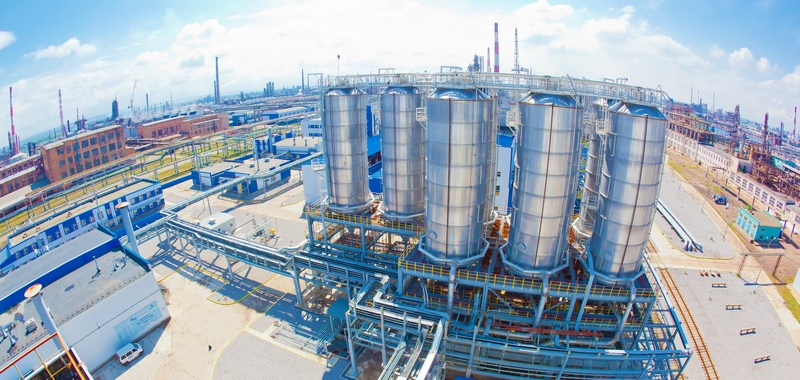

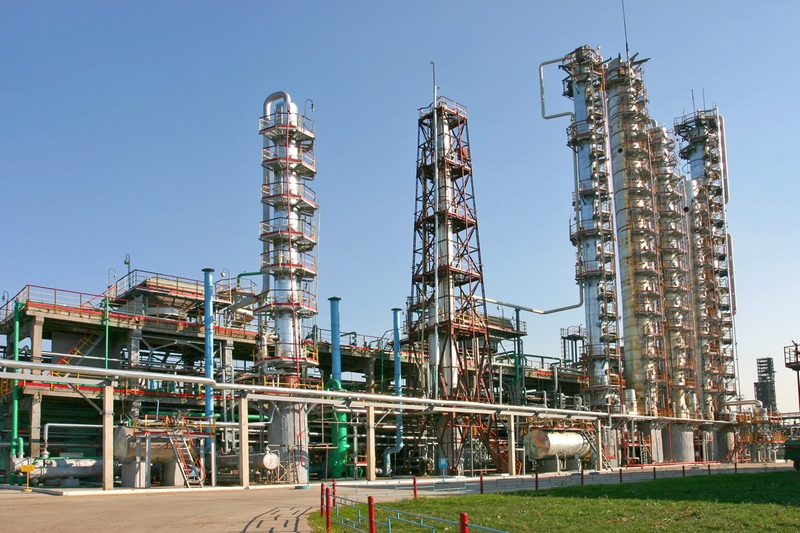

== See also ==
- List of companies of Russia
- Petroleum industry in Russia
