= Ahmadjon Odilov =

Soviet Uzbek politician (1925–2017)

- Born: May 1, 1925; Gurumsaray, Pap District, Fergana, Uzbek SSR, Soviet Union (now Uzbekistan)
- Died: September 27, 2017 (aged 92); Pap District, Fergana, Uzbekistan
- Citizenship: Uzbekistan
- Occupation: Politician
- Political party: Communist Party of the Soviet Union
- Awards: Hero of Socialist Labour

Ahmadjon Odilov (Uzbek Cyrillic: Аҳмаджон Одилов, Russian: Ахмаджан Адылов; 1 May 1925 – 25 September 2017) was an Uzbek politician. For his work in agriculture management, he was awarded the title Hero of Socialist Labor. In his political career, he was a member of the Central Auditing Commission of the Communist Party of the Soviet Union (CPSU) between 1966 and 1971. He was a delegate to the XXIII, XXIV and XXV Congresses of CPSU (1966, 1971, and 1976), and a deputy of the Supreme Soviet of the USSR of the 9th and 10th convocations (1974–1984). He was also a member of the Presidium of the Supreme Soviet of the USSR and was elected to the Supreme Soviet of the Uzbek SSR three times.

== Biography ==
Odilov was born on 1 May 1925 in Gurumsaray, Pap District, Fergana, Uzbek SSR, Soviet Union (now Uzbekistan). From childhood he worked in agriculture. In the 1960s-1970s, he was chairman of the collective farm named after Lenin in Pap District, Fergana.

Odilov died at his home on 27 September 2017 in Pap District, Namangan, Uzbekistan.

== Controversy ==
Odilov was accused of running agricultural enterprises like a robber baron and torturing people who opposed him. He was imprisoned for corruption charges in both the Soviet Union and independent Uzbekistan.

== Awards ==
- Hero of Socialist Labour (1 March 1965)
- three Order of Lenin (1 March 1965; 8 April 1971; 10 December 1973)
- Order of the October Revolution (25 December 1976)

== Books ==
In 2019, Uzbek writer Ortiqali Nomozov's Odilovni otmoqchi edilar was published by Yangi kitob. The book, focusing on Adylov, describes suffering, experiences, and efforts to break prisoners' will and their physical destructions in prison.
