= Asgar Abdullayev (scientist) =

- Professor (1970), the USSR Council of Ministers Prize laureate (1988).
- Born: January 1, 1927; Eyvazli, Qubadli, Azerbaijan SSR
- Died: April 15, 1998 (aged 71); Baku, Azerbaijan
- Citizenship: Azerbaijan
- Awards: Medal For labor Valour, Order of the Red Banner of Labor, Order of the October Revolution
- Scientific career
- Fields: Technical science
- Workplaces: National Academy of Sciences of the Azerbaijan SSR

Askar Alakbar oghlu Abdullayev (Azerbaijani: Əsgər Ələkbər oğlu Abdullayev; 1 January 1927, Eyvazli village, Gubadli district, Azerbaijan SSR – 15 April 1998, Baku, Azerbaijan) was a Soviet and Azerbaijani electrical engineer, scientist, doctor of technical sciences (1969), the USSR State Prize laureate (1969), corresponding member of the Academy of Sciences of the Azerbaijan SSR (1969), professor (1970), the USSR Council of Ministers Prize laureate (1988).

== Biography ==
Abdullayev was born on January 1, 1927, in the village of Eyvazli, Gubadli district, Azerbaijan SSR. He graduated from high school in 1943. In 1949 he graduated from the Energy Department of the Azerbaijan Industrial Institute. After a short work at the Institute of Power Engineering of the Academy of Sciences of the Azerbaijan SSR, he started postgraduate studies at the Institute of Automation and Telemechanics (IAT) of the USSR Academy of Sciences supervised by M. A. Aizerman.

In 1953 he defended his Ph.D. thesis on the automation of oil production in compressor wells and worked for the IAT as a junior researcher for three years (1951-1954). He was a member of the CPSU since 1953. In 1954, Abdullayev headed the laboratory of automation and telemechanics under the AZINMASH Institute of Petroleum Engineering and initiated the works on integrated automation in the oil fields of Azerbaijan. Since 1956 he was senior researcher. In 1957–1959, he became deputy director, and in 1959–1985, director of the research and design institute (RDI) “Neftekhimavtomat”. In 1985–1994, he became Director General of the Scientific and Production Association (SPA) “Neftgazavtomat” within RDI “Neftekhimavtomat” (parent organization), Ali-Bayramli (present Shirvan) plants of equipment “Pribori”, “Industrial Automation and Telemechanics”, Baku plant “Geofizpribor”.

He died on April 15, 1998, Baku, Azerbaijan.

== Scientific activity ==
Scientific achievements of Abdullaev are represented in 19 books and brochures, more than 200 articles and 70 inventions. He reported at international conferences, including in the USA (Boston – 1975, Alaska – 1987), the Netherlands (The Hague) – 1977, Hungary (Budapest) – 1982.

The Deputy Minister of Instrument Engineering of Automation and Control Systems of the USSR E.B.Smirnov stated: “The works by A. A. Abdullaev enriched the theory and practice of automation of control in the oil and gas industry, laid the foundations for a systematic multi-level and multi-circuit approach to the automatization of the oil industry based on a unified technical, information and organizational support.”

V. A. Trapeznikov (academician, honorary director of the Institute of Control Problems) and I. V. Prangishvili (academician of the Academy of Sciences of the GSSR, director of the Institute of Control Problems) mentioned that “he and his scientific school founded general principles for controlling the processing of hydrocarbon raw materials, developed a new trend, i.e., structural adaptation in assessing the parameters of models of technological control objects”; “he established theoretical foundations for building automated control systems for associations and oil production enterprises and created information and control complexes. He developed theoretical and practical foundations of automation and control of objects of transport and storage of oil and oil products.”

== Scientific and pedagogical activity ==
Abdullaev supervised more than 40 PhDs in technical sciences, several doctors of sciences. He lectured at AzINEFTEXIM (Azerbaijan State Oil and Industrial University), prepared a textbook on the theory of automated control.

== Titles, degrees and awards ==
- 1953 – PhD in technical sciences
- 1966 – Order of the Badge of Honor
- 1969 – the USSR State Prize Laureate for participation (as a manager) in the creation and widespread implementation of systems and a set of tools for automating the oil fields in Azerbaijan
- 1969 – Doctor of Technical Sciences
- 1969 – Corresponding Member of the Academy of Sciences of the Azerbaijan SSR
- 1970 – Professor
- 1970 – Medal “For labor Valour”
- 1971 – Order of the “Red Banner of Labor”
- 1972 – Honored Engineer of the Azerbaijan SSR
- 1976 – Order of the October Revolution
- 1988 – The USSR Council of Ministers Prize Laureate

== Memory ==
In late 2007, on the occasion of the eightieth anniversary of the birth of A.A.Abdullayev, the Baku publishing house “Nauka” published a bibliographic book Askar Abdullayev – 80 in the series "Azerbaijani figures of science and culture".
