= Salavat, Russia =

City in the Republic of Bashkortostan, Russia

Salavat Салават
- City

Other transcription(s)
  - Bashkir: Салауат
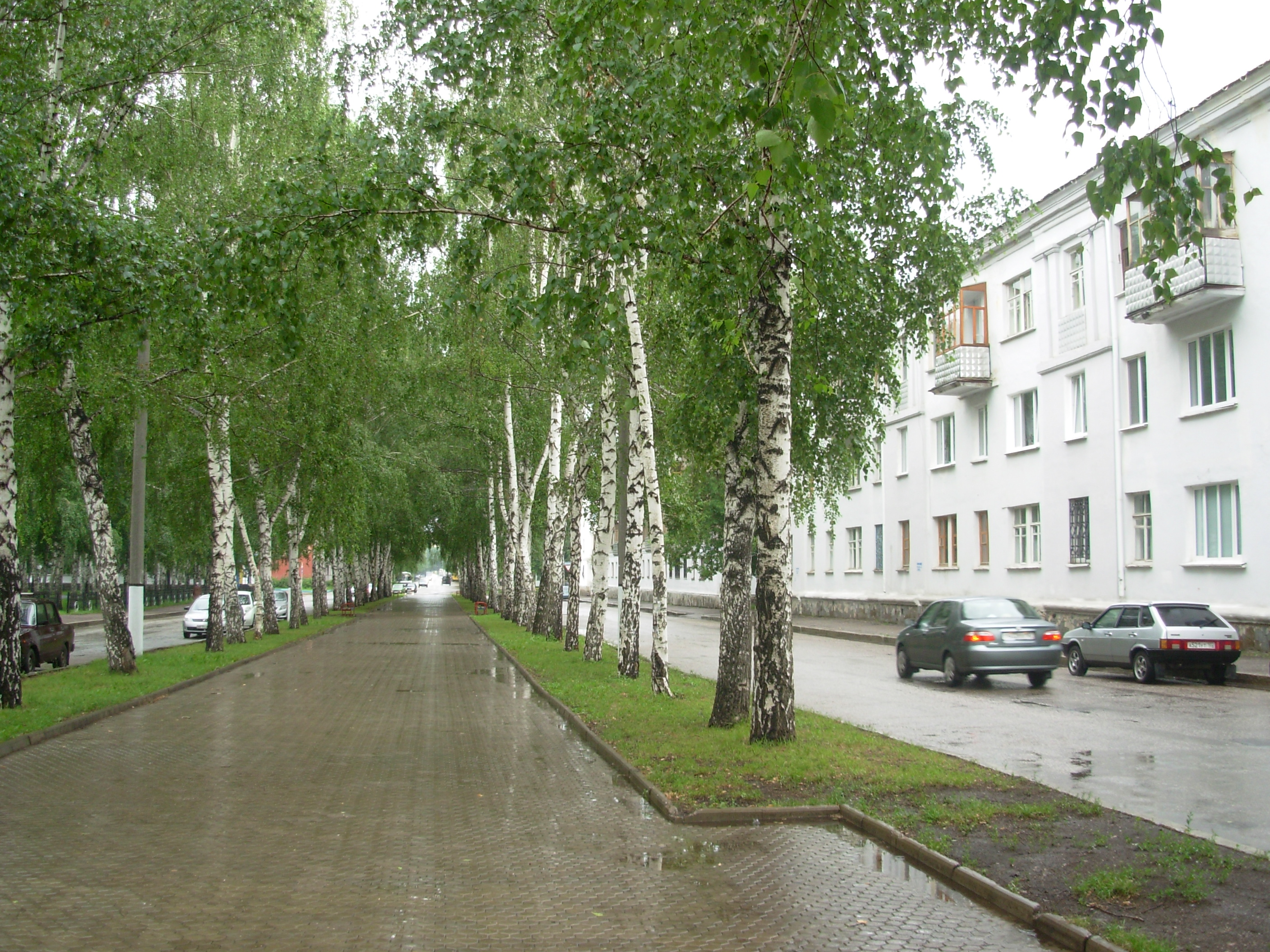
- Neftyanikov Street

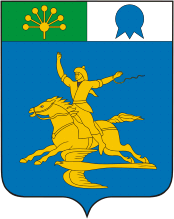
- Flag Coat of arms
- Interactive map of Salavat
- Location of Salavat Salavat (Bashkortostan)
- Coordinates: 53°22′N 55°56′E
- Country: Russia
- Federal subject: Bashkortostan
- Founded: 1948
- City status since: 1954

Government
  - Body: City Duma
  - Head: Farid Gilmanov
- Elevation: 150 m (490 ft)

Population (2010 Census)
  - Total: 156,095
  - Estimate (2025): 144,970 (−7.1%)
  - Rank: 113th in 2010

Administrative status
  - Subordinated to: city of republic significance of Salavat
  - Capital of: city of republic significance of Salavat

Municipal status
  - Urban okrug: Salavat Urban Okrug
  - Capital of: Salavat Urban Okrug
- Time zone: UTC+5 (MSK+2)
- Postal code: 453250
- Dialing code: +7 3476
- OKTMO ID: 80739000001
- Website: archive.today/20121205045122/http://salavat.ru/

Salavat (Russian: Салава́т; Bashkir: Салауат, romanized: Salawat) is the third most-populous city in Bashkortostan, Russia, after the capital, Ufa, and nearby Sterlitamak. It is a major industrial city located on the western bank of the Belaya River. It is approximately 93 miles (149.7 km) from the capital, Ufa, and approximately 16 miles (25.8 km) from Sterlitamak which it is a near twin city to, forming a tri-city metropolitan area called the South Bashkortostan agglomeration with Sterlitamak and Ishambay. The approximate population in 2025 was about 144,970 people.

== Demographics ==
The population according to recent censuses was 156,095 (2010 census); 158,600 (2002 census); 149,627 (1989 Soviet census).

Historical population
Year	Pop.	±%
1959	60,667	—
1970	113,932	+87.8%
1979	137,237	+20.5%
1989	149,627	+9.0%
2002	158,600	+6.0%
2010	156,095	−1.6%
2021	148,575	−4.8%
Source: Census data

== History ==
The city is named after Bashkir national hero Salawat Yulayev. It was founded in 1948 and granted town status in 1954.

== Administrative and municipal status ==
Within the framework of administrative divisions, it is incorporated as the city of republic significance of Salavat—an administrative unit with the status equal to that of districts. As a municipal division, the city is incorporated as Salavat Urban Okrug.

== Economy ==
The city was founded to support the Gazprom Neftekhim Salavat petrochemical plant that is the main local employer. Other factories include glass, textile and clothing factories.

It is a major center of oil refining and petrochemicals. Salavatnefteorgsintez produces liquid fuels, alcohols, butyl, polyethylene of high pressure, nitrogen fertilizers, etc.). The processing capacity of the complex is 11.7 million tons a year.

The oil refinery complex is near pipelines associated with Ishimbay, Shkapova, and Arlan oil fields, Kargaly and Orenburg region gas fields, Karachaganak and Kazakhstan condensates, as well as Sterlitimak chemical enterprise.

Salavatneftemash is a car repair and experimental prototype for the production of steel structures. In addition, JSC Salavatsteklo is a large technical glass plant. Other factories produce concrete and mineral wool products, garments, hunting equipment and jerseys. Food and woodworking production also takes place.

== Government ==
The Head of the administration is Farit Farrakhovich Gilmanov. Larisa Vladimirovna Davydova serves as the Head of Salavat Urban Okrug and the Chairman of Salavatsky Municipal District.

== Education and culture ==
The city has 26 secondary educational institutions, including three high schools, three lyceums, one boarding school, and 19 secondary schools. Music and arts schools are present.

A branch of the Ufa State Petroleum Technical University operates in the city.

Cultural facilities include the Bashkir Drama Theater, four palaces of culture, a movie theater, a museum, and an art gallery.

== Sport ==
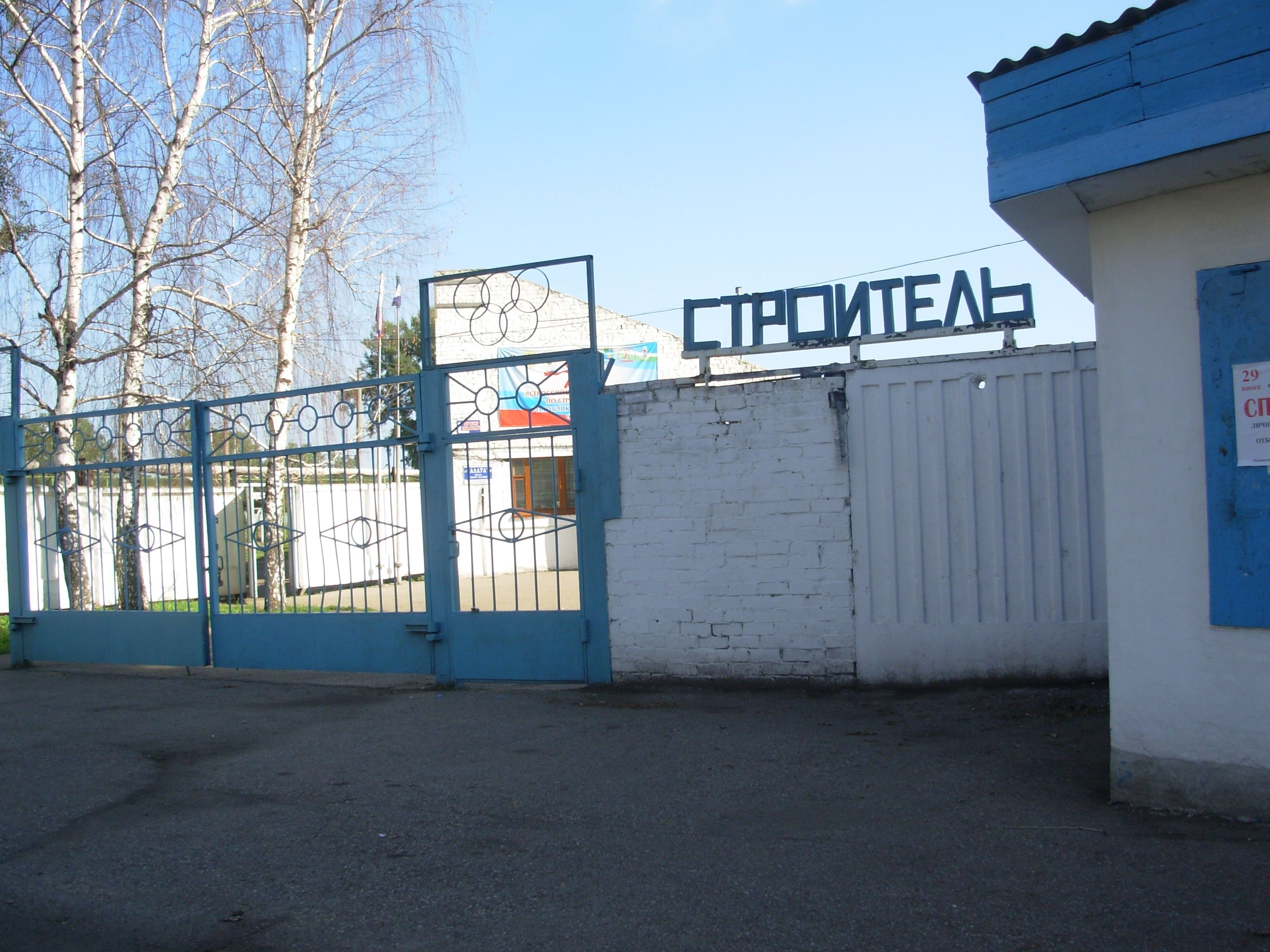
Entrance to the Stroitel Stadium

Salavat Speedway is a motorcycle speedway team and a multi-purpose venue known as the Stroitel Stadium. The stadium is located in the Central Park of Culture and Recreation, which is on the eastern edge of the city and also incorporates the 50th Anniversary of October Stadium. The stadium held the final of the 1968 Individual Ice Speedway World Championship, won by Gabdrakhman Kadyrov.
