= Mamed Iskenderov =

Soviet politician

- Məmməd İsgəndərov

Chairman of the Presidium of the Supreme Soviet of the Azerbaijan SSR
- In office December 29, 1961 – December 29, 1969
- Preceded by: Saftar Jafarov
- Succeeded by: Gurban Khalilov

The 6th Chairman of the Council of Ministers of the Azerbaijan SSR
- In office July 10, 1959 – December 29, 1961

Personal details
- Born: December 17, 1915 Eyvazly, Zangezur uezd, Elizavetpol Governorate, Russian Empire
- Died: May 28, 1985 (aged 69)
- Party: CPSU
- Education: Azerbaijan State Oil and Industry University

Mamed Iskenderov (December 17 [O.S. December 4] 1915 – May 28, 1985) was the chairman of the Council of Ministers of the Azerbaijan Soviet Socialist Republic from July 10, 1959 to December 29, 1961. He was a member of the Communist Party.

An ethnic Kurd, he was one of the few representatives of the indigenous minorities of the Azerbaijan SSR appointed to important government posts because he was officially registered as “Azerbaijani” (since the leadership of the Azerbaijan SSR pursued a policy of forced assimilation of its indigenous peoples, including the Kurds, among other things registering members of these communities in documents as “Azerbaijanis”).

== See also ==
- Prime Minister of Azerbaijan
