= Stanislav Postnikov =

Soviet military officer (1928–2012)

Stanislav Postnikov was a Soviet military commander who reached the rank of Army General.

He joined the Soviet Ground Forces in 1948. From August 1979 he was Commander of the North Caucasus Military District. From August 1980 - Commander of the Baltic Military District. From January 1984 - Commander of the Trans-Baikal Military District. Since December, 1986 - First Deputy Commander of the Soviet Ground Forces. From June 1988 he was the Commander of the Western Direction. The Western Direction was disestablished in mid 1992, seemingly after being moved to Smolensk. After six months Postnikov was released from military service.

Reports appear to indicate he died in 2012. Buried 11 May 2012 at Troyekurovskoye Cemetery.
