= Leonid Sharayev =

Soviet-Ukrainian politician (1935–2021)

First Secretary of the Mykolaiv Oblast Committee of the Communist Party of Ukraine
- In office 16 October 1980 – 25 May 1990
- Preceded by: Vladimir Vaslyaev
- Succeeded by: Ivan Hrytsai

Personal details
- Born: 12 April 1935 Chervonyi Maiak, Beryslav Raion, Ukrainian SSR, Soviet Union
- Died: 13 December 2021 (aged 86)
- Party: CPSU; KPU
- Education: Nikolaev Shipbuilding Institute; Communist Party of the Soviet Union Central Committee Academy, of Sciences

Leonid Sharayev (Ukrainian: Леоні́д Гаври́лович Шара́єв; 12 April 1935 – 13 December 2021) was a Soviet-Ukrainian politician. A member of the Communist Party of the Soviet Union since 1957, he served as First Secretary of the Mykolaiv Oblast Committee of the Communist Party of Ukraine from 1980 to 1990. He was part of the Communist Party of the Soviet Union Central Auditing Commission since 1981.

== Early life ==
Sharayev was born on 12 April 1935 in the village of Chervonyi Maiak, which was then part of the Ukrainian SSR in the Soviet Union. After graduating from the Nikolaev Shipbuilding Institute, he worked at the Black Sea Shipyard in Mykolaiv initially as an assistant foreman then a foreman. He eventually became the secretary of the Komsomol committee for the plant.

== Political career ==
In 1960, he started taking on higher political positions within the Ukrainian SSR. He first became second secretary of the regional Komsomol branch for Mykolaiv Oblast, eventually rising to the rank of first secretary. In October 1980, he was appointed First Secretary of the Mykolaiv Oblast Committee of the Communist Party of Ukraine, which he did until May 1990. During this time, he was elected a deputy of the Supreme Soviet for its 11th convocation (1984-1989) from the Voznesensk territorial district. During his tenure, he built the first trolleybus lines and multiple pedagogical universities, and a main focus of his tenure was agriculture and shipbuilding. In 1990, he became First Deputy Head of the Secretariat of the Supreme Soviet of the Ukrainian SSR, which he did until the collapse of the Soviet Union.

After the collapse of the Soviet Union, he became deputy chairman of the Mykolaiv Zemlyachestvo - a regional association for those from Mykolaiv - in the city of Kyiv which he did until 2010. In his later years in Kyiv, he emphasized unity and stated that the main focus needed to be defending territorial integrity. In later interviews, he commentated on Soviet history, saying that the Holodomor was not a genocide while simultaneously acknowledging Soviet-era tragedies and was critical of Ukraine's deindustrialization.
