= Yuri Izrael =

Russian scientist (1930–2014)

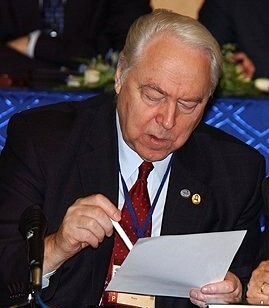
- September 29, 2003
- Born: Yuri Antonievich Izrael; May 15, 1930; Tashkent, Uzbek SSR, Soviet Union
- Died: January 23, 2014 (aged 83); Moscow, Russia

Yuri Antonievich Izrael (Russian: Юрий Антониевич Израэль; 15 May 1930, Tashkent – 23 January 2014, Moscow) was a Soviet and Russian meteorologist. He served as the vice-chairman of the Intergovernmental Panel on Climate Change (IPCC) until September 2008, when the new bureau was elected. He was the "most influential scientific adviser" for Vladimir Putin, the president of Russia, according to CNN.

Izrael was former chairman of the Committee for Hydrometeorology. He also served as director of the Institute of Global Climate and Ecology, which is a part of the Russian Academy of Sciences. He was a first vice-president of the World Meteorological Organization and helped develop the World Weather Watch.

In 1992, Izrael won the International Meteorological Organization Prize and the UNEP Sasakawa Environment Prize for, among other accomplishments, contributing to the "success of Working Group I I" of the IPCC.

== Views on the Kyoto Protocol ==
Since 2001, the Russian president Vladimir Putin had received a large number of appeals from the heads of foreign states about the need for Russia to ratify the Kyoto Protocol. At a meeting of the Security Council, Vladimir Putin instructed his advisor Andrey Illarionov to find out whether the ratification of the Kyoto Protocol was in Russia's national interest. Not trusting to experts from Intergovernmental Panel on Climate Change, Andrey Illarionov decided to address the President of the Russian Academy of Sciences, Yury Osipov, and Yuri Israel, with a request to involve Russian leading scientists in the discussion of this issue. On January 16, 2004, the first meeting of a scientific seminar on the adoption of the Kyoto Protocol took place at the Russian Academy of Sciences, when Yuri Israel headed the seminar. Yuri Izrael proposed to influence the climate by removing carbon dioxide from the atmosphere and introducing an additional amount of aerosols into the stratosphere. He also pointed to the dual role of carbon dioxide: doubling its quantity in the atmosphere made it possible to increase the yields of major crops, but this fact was outweighed by the negative aspects of anthropogenic warming.

Yuri Izrael believed the Kyoto Protocol, an international treaty aimed at reducing global greenhouse gas emissions, is not scientifically supported and damaging for the Russian economy, stating, "the Kyoto Protocol is overly expensive, ineffective and based on bad science."

== Views on global warming ==
Izrael stated, "climate change is obvious, but science has not yet been able to identify the causes of it," and, "there is no proven link between human activity and global warming." This was a statement seemingly made in stark contrast to the IPCC conclusion that "most of the observed increase in globally averaged temperatures since the mid-20th century is very likely [confidence level >90%] due to the observed increase in anthropogenic [human] greenhouse gas concentrations."

Izrael agreed with the IPCC predictions for future climate change, stating, "Global temperatures will likely rise by 1.4-5.8 degrees during the next 100 years. The average increase will be three degrees. I do not think that this threatens mankind. Sea levels, due to rise by 47 cm in the 21st century, will not threaten port cities." He also states, "I think the panic over global warming is totally unjustified. There is no serious threat to the climate," and, "There is no need to dramatize the anthropogenic impact, because the climate has always been subject to change under Nature's influence, even when humanity did not even exist." Additionally, he did not believe the 0.6 °C (1.08 °F) rise in temperature observed in the last 100 years is a threat, stating, "there is no scientifically sound evidence of the negative processes that allegedly begin to take place at such temperatures."

Instead of decreasing carbon dioxide, he argued, aerosol injections in to the stratosphere would be a more effective way to mitigate global warming. He appeared to favor adaption over mitigation, arguing, "The people of Bangladesh, who live at sea level, may face problems if the Indian Ocean rises. Still, their resettlement would be much cheaper than projected Kyoto Protocol expenses."

== Criticism ==
Izrael was chairman of the State Committee on Hydrometeorology (Goskomgidromet) at the time of the Chernobyl nuclear accident. Following the accident he was widely criticized for slow and inaccurate monitoring. He was also criticized for allowing air pollution throughout the Soviet Union to reach unprecedented levels. In a 2004 article published in Nature, Quirin Schiermeier and Bryon MacWilliams referred to him as a "fossil communist fighting for fossil fuel."

== See also ==
- Mikhail Budyko
- Global warming controversy
