= Gurban Khalilov =

Azerbaijani politician

- Azerbaijani: Qurban Xəlilov

Chairman of the Presidium of the Supreme Soviet of the Azerbaijan SSR
- In office 25 December 1969 – 30 December 1985
- Preceded by: Mammad Isgandarov
- Succeeded by: Suleyman Tatliyev

Minister of Finance of the Azerbaijan SSR
- In office 3 November 1958 – 25 December 1969
- Preceded by: Rza Sadikhov
- Succeeded by: Bakhshali Bakhshaliyev

Minister of Local Industry of the Azerbaijan SSR
- In office 14 July 1956 – 3 November 1958
- Preceded by: Salim Gasimov
- Succeeded by: Davud Mammadov

Personal details
- Born: November 15, 1906 Ardabil, Qajar Iran
- Died: March 20, 2000 (aged 93) Baku, Azerbaijan
- Party: CPSU
- Children: Farhad Khalilov
- Education: Azerbaijan Oil Institute
- Awards: Order of Lenin Order of the October Revolution Order of the Red Banner of Labour

Gurban Ali oghlu Khalilov (Azerbaijani: Qurban Əli oğlu Xəlilov; 15 November 1906 – 20 March 2000) was an Azerbaijani politician, Chairman of the Presidium of the Supreme Soviet of Azerbaijan SSR, Minister of Local Industry of the Azerbaijan SSR, Minister of Finance of the Azerbaijan SSR, Deputy Chairman of the Presidium of the Supreme Soviet and deputy of VIII–XI convocations.

== Biography ==
Gurban Khalilov was born on November 15, 1906, in Ardabil, Qajar Iran and moved to Baku in 1908 with his family. At the age of 15, he began working as a laborer at Nobel Plant in Keshla settlement of Baku.

He was graduated from Azerbaijan Oil Institute in 1933. In 1932–1935 and 1937 he worked as an engineer and workshop manager at the plant named after S. M. Kirov in Baku. In 1935–1936 he served in Soviet Army, in 1937–1942 he worked as a director of Lieutenant Schmidt, S. M. Kirov, F. Dzerzhinsky machine-building plants, in 1942–1945 as a secretary of Baku City Party Committee.

G. Khalilov died on 20 March 2000 in Baku.

== Career ==
Gurban Khalilov organized mass production of Katyusha rocket launcher during the war years when he was in charge of a number of factories. He was tasked with overseeing uninterrupted sending of weapons and ammunition to the front.

In 1945–1955, Gurban Khalilov worked as Deputy Chief of "Azneft" and "Azneftkashfiyyat" Associations, Deputy Minister of State Economy, Chief of the Construction Department, and Deputy Minister of the Construction Materials Industry of the Azerbaijan SSR. Gurban Khalilov, Deputy Chairman of Baku City Executive Committee and Minister of Local Industry of the Azerbaijan SSR in 1956–1958, Minister of Finance of the Azerbaijan SSR in 1958–1969, served as Chairman of the Presidium of the Supreme Soviet of the Azerbaijan SSR from 1969, and simultaneously from 1970, Deputy Chairman of the Presidium of the Supreme Soviet of the Soviet Union.

He has been a member of the Central Committee of the Communist Party of the Soviet Union since 1926, a member of the Central Inspection Commission of the Communist Party of the Soviet Union since 1971, and a deputy of the Supreme Soviet of the Soviet Union since 1970 (VIII-XI convocations). Later, he served as chairman of the Azerbaijan Society for the Protection of Historical and Cultural Monuments.

== Memorial ==
By the order of President Ilham Aliyev, the memorial plaque was placed in the house where G. Khalilov lived (Nizami St. 70), and one of the streets in Baku was named after him.

== Awards ==
- 4 Orders of Lenin
- Order of the October Revolution
- Order of the Red Banner of Labour
- Order of the Red Star
