= Domna Komarova =

Soviet politician

- Born: October 18, 1920; Lamskoye, Yeletsky Uyezd, Russian Empire
- Died: December 31, 1994 (aged 74); Moscow, Russia

Domna Pavlovna Komarova (Russian: Домна Павловна Комарова) was a Soviet and Russian politician.

She was a Minister of Social Affairs from 1967 to 1988.
