= Gamar Salamzade =

Azerbaijani film director and screenwriter

- Born: Qəmər Əliqulu qızı Salamzadə; 5 May 1908
- Died: 20 April 1994 (aged 85)
- Occupations: film director, screenwriter
- Known for: first Azerbaijani female film director
- Notable work: "Rampant Band"

Gamar Ali Kuli gizi Salamzade (Azerb.: Qəmər Əliqulu qızı Salamzadə, 5 May 1908, Julfa, Nakhchivan – 20 April 1994, Baku) was an Azerbaijani and Soviet film director and screenwriter. She was the first Azerbaijani female film director and the creator of the first children’s film in Azerbaijan.

== Life ==
Gamar Salamzade was born on 5 May 1908 in Julfa, Nakhchivan. In 1912 her family moved to Tbilisi where in 1919 her father, a famous poet Aligulu Gamkusar, was killed by Mensheviks. After graduating from the Azerbaijan Pedagogical Institute, Salamzade in 1929 went to study at the Moscow State College of Cinematography learning from Lev Kuleshov and Sergei Eisenstein. She took an internship with film director Alexander Dovzhenko.

After completing her education, Salamzade returned to Baku in 1931-32 and studied at the graduate school together with director Rza Tahmasib, artists Salam Salamzade and Rustam Mustafayev. During this period, she wrote scripts for the films Natavan and Nizami.

== Career ==
In 1935 Salamzade became the second director of the silent film Dancing Turtles, based on the story of Abdullah Shaikh "The Playing Tortoise". Another film she co-directed with Alexander Popov was The Naughty Gang (1937). The film was considered lost for many years until it was rediscovered in Russian State Film Fund and shown to Azerbaijani audience in 2008.

After starting a career as a director, she was appointed assistant director of the film Golden Shrub and became an assistant director of the film Weak People.

Salamzade’s main activity in the “Azerbaijan” film studio began when Mehdi Hussein headed this organization in 1944. She became the screenwriter and director of the documentary Song of Healing about a doctor Husniyya Diyarova.

In 1946, Salamzada had an internship at the Mosfilm studios in the firm Life of Flowers dedicated to Ivan Michurin.

Among other dozens of Salamzade’s films should be mentioned Handless People, 26 Baku Commissars, Rampant Band, Azerbaijan – Order Bearer, Sabukhi and One Family. She also dubbed Azerbaijani films.

Salamzade is an author of the book The world seen through a small window.

Gamar Salamzade died in 1994 in Baku at the age of 86.

== Personal life ==
Gamar Salamzade was married to People’s Artist Salam Salamzade and had two daughters.
