= Kazim Kazimzade =

Azerbaijani painter (1913-1992)

Kazim Kazimzade Kazım Kazımzadə
- Born: Kazım Məmmədəli oğlu Kazımzadə; August 10, 1913; Baku, Russian Empire
- Died: October 4, 1992 (aged 79); Baku, Azerbaijan
- Occupation: Painter
- Awards: Honored Art Worker of the Azerbaijan SSR People's Artist of the Azerbaijan SSR Stalin Prize Order of the Red Banner of Labour

Kazim Kazimzade (Azerbaijani: Kazım Kazımzadə; 10 August 1913, Baku – 4 October 1992, Baku) was a Soviet and Azerbaijani painter. People's Artist of the Azerbaijan SSR, recipient of the Stalin Prize and the Order of the Red Banner of Labour.

== Biography ==
Kazim Kazimzade was born on August 10, 1913, in Baku. Since school years, Kazimzade showed interest in the visual arts. In his formation as an artist, one of the main roles was played by his teacher, a famous graphic artist, an employee of the magazine “Molla Nasraddin” Emir Hajiyev. He studied at the Technical School of Art in Baku in 1933–1936. In the early 40s, he took part in the Great Patriotic War. From 1942 to his death, he was director of the National Art Museum of Azerbaijan.

In 1943, Kazim Kazimzade was awarded the title of Honored Art Worker of the Azerbaijan SSR and in 1950 he was awarded the Stalin Prize. Since 1952, Kazimzade was a member of the Communist Party of the Soviet Union, and since 1954 - a full member of the Soviet Committee of the International Council of Museums. In 1960, the artist graduated from the Leningrad Institute of Painting, Sculpture and Architecture. In 1965, he was awarded the title of People's Painter of the Azerbaijan SSR, the Order of the Red Banner of Labour and medals.

Kazim Kazimzade created mainly in the genre of book illustration and easel graphics. In the first period of his work he illustrated the poems of the classic of Azerbaijan poetry Nizami Ganjavi "Eskandar-nameh" ("The Book of Alexander"), "Makhzan ol-Asrar" ("Treasury of secrets") (1940), "Layla and Majnun" (1947), "Khosrow and Shirin" (1948), as well children's books "Fitne", "The Magic Ring", "Iskender and the Shepherd". Kazimzade also illustrated the works of poets such as Mahsati, Khaqani, Qatran Tabrizi, Khatai and Hafez. In a series of paintings "On the Ways of the Front" the artist reflected the horrors of World War II. Among the paintings on a military theme “Destroyed Fascist Tank”, “At Rest”, “Letter from Mother” are distinguished.

Political posters and caricatures also occupied a significant place in the artist’s work. Collaborating since 1952 with the satirical magazine "Kirpi" (“Hedgehog”), Kazimzade created the series of paintings on historical and everyday topics (“Historical revolutionary events in Baku”, “Medical workers”, “Life of H. Abovyan”, “416th division in battle”, “In Free Cuba”, “Iraq Paintings”). He also created costumes for opera and drama performances, as well as for films. The author of plot carpets dedicated to Joseph Stalin (1949) and Vladimir Lenin (1957). The artist also had a series of works “Our children” (“I am listening to you”, “I will paint a picture”, “Before the performance”). In addition to his works, Kazimzade created portraits of the Azerbaijani writer and enlightener Abbasgulu Bakikhanov, poet Ali Fazli and folklorist Abulgasim Huseynzade. Collaborating with artists such as Azim Azimzade, Emir Hajiyev, Salam Salamzade, Sadig Sharifzade, Ismayil Akhundov, Maral Rahmanzadeh, took part in the creation of such series of paintings as "Dress warmer, going to the front", "Friendship of the peoples of the Caucasus".

Kazim Kazimzade died on October 4, 1992, in Baku.

== Filmography ==
- Gift Carpet (1949)
- The Secret of the Tower (1959)
- Where is Ahmad? (1963)
- For the Sake of Law (1968)
- Our Jabish Teacher (1969)
- The Winds Blow in Baku (1974)
- A Thousand Treasures (1976)
- Life of Uzeyir (1981)
- Bloody Ground (1985)
