= Amir Hajiyev =

Azerbaijani painter

- Əmir Hacıyev
- Born: Əmir Səhliəli oğlu Hacıyev; May 17, 1899; Shusha, Shusha uezd, Elizavetpol Governorate, Russian Empire
- Died: August 21, 1972 (aged 73); Baku, Azerbaijan SSR, USSR
- Known for: Painter
- Style: Graphics and illustration
- Awards: Honored Art Worker of the Azerbaijan SSR

Amir Hajiyev (Azerbaijani: Əmir Hacıyev, 17 May 1899 – 21 August 1972) was an Azerbaijani graphic artist, Honored Art Worker of the Azerbaijan SSR.

== Biography ==
Amir Hajiyev was born on 17 May 1899, in Shusha. He began his creative work in Shusha in 1918 by creating posters and portraits. In 1923, A. Hajiyev started to study at the Azerbaijan State Art School.

Since the second half of the 1920s, Amir Hajiyev had been making illustrations for magazines such as The Woman of Azerbaijan (magazine) and The Trade Union, and had begun to create posters on cooperation and other topics. At the same time, he was engaged in teaching in Baku. Amir Hajiyev taught Kazim Kazimzade. Since that time, A. Hajiyev created illustrations of works by well-known writers. "Khavar" (Mehdi Huseyn; 1930), "Country of the Giants" (1932), "Layla and Majnun" (Fuzuli; 1953), and "Mail Box" (Jalil Mammadguluzadeh; 1960) are examples of these works.

Illustrations of "Garaja Giz" by Suleyman Sani Akhundov (1924), "Rising" by Abulhasan Alakbarzadeh (1931), "Fountain of Girls" by Yusif Vazir Chamanzaminli (1934), "Molla Ibrahim-Khalil Kimyagar" by Mirza Fatali Akhundov (1938), Haft Peykar by Nizami Ganjavi (1941), and "Layla and Majnun" by Fuzuli (1953) are considered the best book illustrations by Hajiyev.

He started creating propaganda posters during the Great Patriotic War of 1941–1945. At the same time, Hajiyev provided sketches for a number of decorative and plot carpets and authored miniature series ("Azerbaijan", 1961; "Shusha", "Shamakhi", "Baku", 1964).

In 1943, the painter was awarded the title of Honored Artist of Azerbaijan SSR. Since 1945, he has been a member of the Communist Party of the Soviet Union.

Amir Hajiyev died on 21 August 1972 in Baku.
