= Azer Aliyev (artist) =

Azerbaijani painter

Azer Aliyev Azər Əliyev
- Born: July 18, 1969 (age 56); Baku, Azerbaijan SSR, USSR
- Education: Azerbaijan State Art School named after Azim Azimzade; Azerbaijan State University of Culture and Arts
- Known for: artist

Azer Seyran oghlu Aliyev (Azerbaijani: Azər Seyran oğlu Əliyev, born July 18, 1969) is the Azerbaijani painter, graphic artist and designer. Associate Professor of Azerbaijan State Academy of Fine Arts.

== Biography ==
Azer Aliyev was born on July 18, 1969, in Baku. He studied at Azerbaijan State Art School named after Azim Azimzade in 1984–1988. In 1992–1997 A. Aliyev studied at Azerbaijan State University of Culture and Arts.

Since 1992, he has worked as a designer-artist in the documentary film studio of Azerbaijan Television. Since 1993, he has participated in international and republican exhibitions. His works have been demonstrated at various exhibitions organized in Germany, Turkey, France, Italy, Russia and other countries.

A. Aliyev's works represented Azerbaijan at the 2018 "Art Shopping" International Exhibition at the Louvre Museum and at art exhibitions in Cannes and Milan.

Azer Aliyev is the member of the Union of Artists of Azerbaijan and the Union of Designers of Azerbaijan.
