= Ağbulaq, Shusha =

Village in Shusha, Azerbaijan

Ağbulaq
- Location within Azerbaijan Location within Karabakh Economic Region
- Country: Azerbaijan
- District: Shusha
- Time zone: UTC+4 (AZT)

Ağbulaq (also spelled Agbulag) is a village in the Shusha District of Azerbaijan. It is located near the village Şırlan. It was under the occupation of the Armed Forces of Armenia.

According to the tripartite declaration dated November 10, 2020, signed on the basis of the results of the Second Nagorno-Karabakh War, the village of Ağbulaq came under the control of the Russian peacekeeping forces. On September 19-20, 2023, after the local anti-terrorist measures implemented in Karabakh, it came under the control of Azerbaijan.
