= Hashim bey Vazirov =

Azerbaijani journalist, writer and publisher

Hashim bey Vazirov Haşım bəy Vəzirov
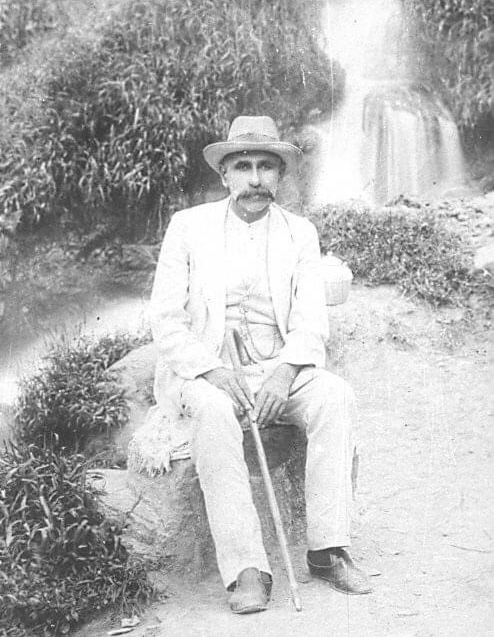
- Born: 1868; Shusha, Russian Empire
- Died: 1916; Baku, Azerbaijan
- Occupation: Writer, journalist and publisher

Hashim bey Miriman oglu Vazirov (Azerbaijani: Haşım bəy Vəzirov; 1868–1916) was an Azerbaijani journalist, writer and publisher.

== Biography ==
Hashim bey Vazirov was born in 1867 in Shusha, a city with rich cultural and political heritage. His family lineage was distinguished—his great-grandfather, Mir İmamverdi, served as vizier to the Khan of Karabakh, and the family adopted the surname Vazirov from the title "vizier." Vazirov received his initial education under local religious teachers before completing his formal schooling in Shusha. In 1899, he graduated from the Irevan Teachers’ Seminary and worked as a teacher in several cities, including Irevan, Barda, Shaki, and Shusha. He also held positions as a school director in rural areas.

Alongside his teaching career, Vazirov was actively engaged in cultural activities. In the 1890s, while teaching at the Shusha real school, he and his colleagues organized theatrical performances. In 1895, they staged “Marrying – not slaking the thirst” play by H.Vazirov. In these years Vazirov translated Othello by Shakespeare into Azerbaijani. Vazirov acted as Othello in a spectacle staged in Shusha, in 1904. Hashimbey Vazirov was the author of such plays as School education, Don’t knock my door – or your door will be knocked, Marrying – not slaking the thirst. He wrote articles dedicated to enlightenment, science, socio-political issues.In 1913, he authored the satirical one-act play The Wedding of Tramway Lady, which reflected on municipal affairs.

== Publishing career ==
Hashim bey Vazirov was a pioneer of Azerbaijani journalism, with over 30 years of experience in the field. He initially worked as editor of the İrşad newspaper, managing fifteen issues and marking the start of his professional journalism career. In 1907, he founded and published the progressive newspaper Taze Hayat ("New Life"), which promoted ideas of freedom, equality, justice, and Islamic values, aiming to modernize the social and cultural conditions of Muslims in the Russian Empire. The newspaper gathered prominent writers and publicists such as Mirza Ali-akbar Sabir and Muhammed Hadi.

Although Taze hayat was closed by government censorship in 1908, Vazirov continued his publishing activities with newspapers like İttifaq (1908–1909), Səda (1909–1911), Kavkazets (a Russian-language paper, 1911), Sədayi-Vətən (1911), Sədayi-Həqq (1912), and Sədayi-Qafqaz (1915–1916). He also edited the satirical magazine Məzəli (1914–1915), which was regarded as one of the most influential humor journals after Molla Nasreddin, critically addressing political and social issues of the time.

== Political activity ==
Vazirov was an Azerbaijani nationalist and took part in armed resistance against Armenian militias during the years of 1905–1906. Due to his activism, he was arrested in 1906 and sentenced to exile. His exile was initially postponed due to illness but was later enforced, sending him to Stavropol. By mid-1906, he was released and returned to Shusha before settling permanently in Baku.

His nationalist stance and journalistic activities made him a target of government repression; in 1911, he was arrested again but soon released. Haşım bəy remained an influential figure in Azerbaijani political and cultural circles until his death in 1916.

== Publications ==
- Везиров Г. Мои воспоминания о «Мектебе».- KB, 1901, № 2, с. 39-48 (паг. 2-я).
