= Abdurrahim bey Hagverdiyev =

Azerbaijani cultural figure and politician (born 1870)

Abdurrahim bey Asad bey oglu Hagverdiyev
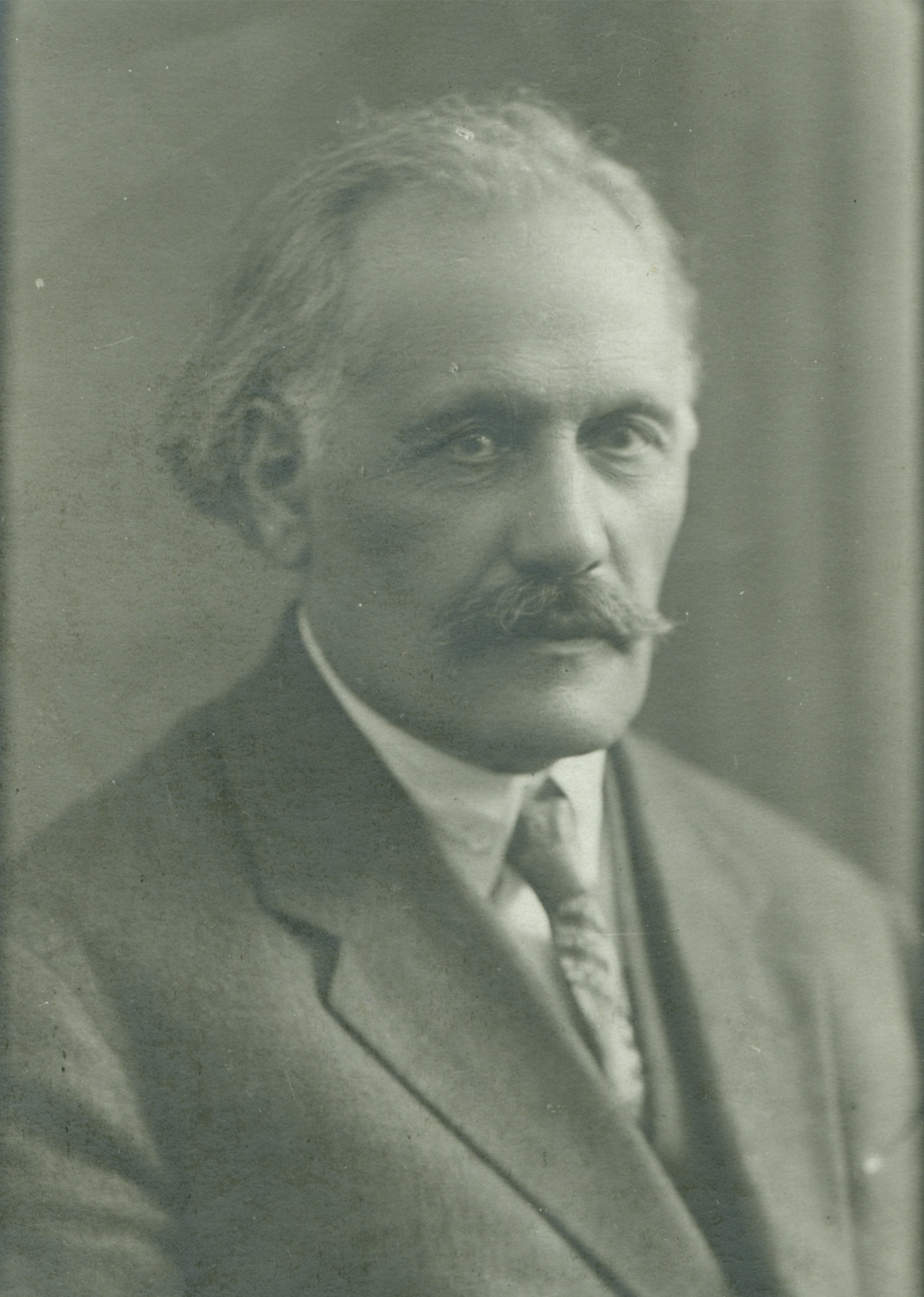
- Born: 17 May 1870; Ağbulaq, Elisabethpol Governorate, Russian Empire
- Died: 11 December 1933 (aged 63); Baku
- Occupations: playwright, stage director, politician and public figure

Abdurrahim bey Asad bey oglu Hagverdiyev (Azerbaijani: Əbdürrəhim bəy Haqverdiyev) (17 May 1870 – 11 December 1933) was an Azerbaijani writer, playwright, public and political figure, educator, literary scholar, and Honored Art Worker of the Azerbaijan SSR (1929), Abdurrahim bey Hagverdiyev is considered a classic of Azerbaijani literature. He was a deputy in the First Russian Duma, a member of the Georgian Parliament, the first conductor at the premiere of Leyli and Majnun, founder and first head of the Theatre Council, and a contributor to the Molla Nasreddin journal.

Active during the late 19th and early 20th centuries, Hagverdiyev continued the literary traditions of Mirza Fatali Akhundov and Najaf bey Vazirov. He contributed to the development of national literature through his satirical and psychological dramas, addressing social and moral issues of his time. His notable plays include The Broken Union (Dağılan tifaq), Greedy Scholars (Ac həriflər), Unlucky Young Man (Bəxtsiz cavan), and The Fairy Magic (Pəri cadu), marked by satire and critical depictions of daily life. He was a member of both the First and Second State Dumas and advocated for Muslim rights in the Russian Empire and the South Caucasus. Hagverdiyev played a prominent role in organizing theatrical performances in Tbilisi and Baku, participated in the press and enlightenment efforts, and contributed to the early activities of the Azerbaijan SSR Academy of Sciences and various literary societies and publications.

== Early life ==
Abdurrahim bey Hagverdiyev was born on May 17, 1870, in the village of Aghbulag near Shusha. His father, Asad bey, an educated official fluent in Russian and Persian, died when Abdurrahim was three. He was then raised by his uncle Abdulkarim bey. After his mother remarried a local official, Hasanali bey Sadiqbayov, his uncle distanced him from her. Abdulkarim bey died in 1875, an event that deeply affected the young Hagverdiyev.

Facing mistreatment in his uncle's household, Hagverdiyev eventually ran away and was warmly accepted by his stepfather, who took responsibility for his upbringing and education. Hasanali bey introduced him to the Russian alphabet and supported his intellectual development.

Hagverdiyev had a younger sister, Nabat, who drowned during a family outing. This event had a lasting emotional impact on him, and he became more withdrawn, often accompanying his stepfather rather than socializing with other children.

=== Education ===
In May 1880, after his stepfather Hasanali bey faced financial ruin, the family moved to Shusha. There, Abdurrahim bey began studying at a temporary summer school run by Yusif bey Melikhaqverdyov, who would become a key figure in his early education. In September of the same year, Hagverdiyev passed the entrance exams for the city school and studied there for a year. In October 1881, he enrolled in the newly established Russian-language Real School in Shusha, where Yusif bey also taught.

Yusif bey, who was deeply interested in theater, organized performances each summer with the help of visiting teachers and students. Hagverdiyev's first encounter with theater took place during one of these performances. Reflecting on this, he later recalled attending a staging of Mirza Fatali Akhundov's "The Vizier of the Lankaran Khanate" (Xırs quldurbasan) and being profoundly impressed by seeing his teachers in costume on stage.

Inspired, Hagverdiyev wrote a short play titled Haji Dashdemir (Hacı Daşdəmir), modeled on Akhundov's Haji Gara, and shared it with Yusif bey, who offered guidance and feedback.

In August 1890, Hagverdiyev moved to Tbilisi to complete his final year at the Real School. At the time, Tbilisi was both a cultural hub of the Caucasus and a major theater center in the Russian Empire. Exposure to the works of Russian and European playwrights had a formative influence on him. After graduating in 1891, he went to St. Petersburg to pursue higher education.

He initially applied to the Institute of Mining Engineering but was not accepted. Choosing to stay in the city, he immersed himself in its cultural life. In 1894, his documents were transferred to the Institute of Railway Engineering, where he was admitted. Although he began formal studies, his growing interest in literature eventually led him to abandon the program. He later attended courses at the Faculty of Oriental Studies at St. Petersburg University as a non-degree student.

During his eight years in St. Petersburg, Hagverdiyev conducted serious research in language and literature. The city's literary and theatrical scene, especially performances at the Alexandrinsky Theatre, played a crucial role in shaping his artistic vision. He later wrote: "In 1891, when I went to Petersburg, I saw a true theatre for the first time. The Alexandrinsky Theatre was at its peak. Giants such as Davydov, Komissarzhevskaya, and Dalsky were performing. I was drawn in completely... I rarely missed a performance."

While in St. Petersburg, Hagverdiyev wrote his first plays: You Will Taste the Goose Meat and Feel Its Delight (Yeyərsən qaz ətini, görərsən ləzzətini, 1892) and The Broken Union (Dağılan Tifaq, 1896).

He spent most of his summer holidays in Shusha, where he collaborated with amateur actors to stage plays. In 1892, he participated in the production of Hashim bey Vazirov's comedy Marriage Is Not Like Drinking Water (Evlənmək su içmək deyil), and in 1897 directed a short dramatic scene titled Majnun at Leyli's Grave (Məcnun Leylinin qəbri üstündə). According to composer Zulfugar Hajibeyov, Hagverdiyev was nicknamed Shabihgardan (the one who stages performances) in Shusha — a testament to his deep passion for theatre.

== Public and political activities ==
In 1899, Abdurrahim bey Hagverdiyev returned from St. Petersburg to Shusha, where he lived for two years collecting written literary materials. In 1900, he wrote and staged the play Unlucky Young Man (Bəxtsiz Cavan), and in 1901, after moving to Baku, completed The Fairy Magic (Pəri Cadu), which, like his previous works, was well received by audiences.

From 1901 to May 1904, he taught at the Third Russian-Tatar Primary School in Baku. There, he interacted with prominent intellectuals such as Hasan bey Zardabi, Najaf bey Vazirov, Nariman Narimanov, Jahangir Zeynalov, and Huseyn Arablinski. Together they developed theatrical repertoires and directed performances. In 1901, he helped establish the "Baku Muslim Troupe" and served as its chief director—the first Azerbaijani intellectual to hold such a position in national theater history.

He directed a wide range of plays including Haji Gara (Hacı Qara), The Vizier of the Lankaran Khanate (Vəziri-Xani-Lənkəran), The Inspector General (Müfəttiş), Othello, The Outlaws (Qaçaqlar), Yağışdan Çıxdıq, Yağmura Düşdük, and his own works. He also trained new talents, helping to professionalize Azerbaijani theater.

Yusif Vazir Chamanzaminli later recalled Hagverdiyev's role in shaping the cultural life of Shusha and staging works such as Monsieur Jordan, The Shattered Union, and Greed (Tamah). He also noted Hagverdiyev's central role in staging Othello in 1904.

Hagverdiyev directed the 1902 and 1903 "Eastern Concerts" at the H.Z. Taghiyev Theatre, which showcased a variety of musical traditions and were enthusiastically received. In May 1904, after being elected to the Shusha municipal council, he returned to his hometown. In 1905, he was elected as a deputy to the First State Duma from Ganja and went to St. Petersburg, where he began work on his historical tragedy Agha Mohammad Shah Qajar (Ağa Məhəmməd şah Qacar), consulting archival and historical sources.

Upon returning to the Caucasus, Hagverdiyev worked as an inspector for the Nadezhda shipping and insurance company and later joined H.Z. Taghiyev's shipping office. His professional duties took him to various regions of the Caucasus and Iran. Some scholars suggest his travels to Iran were also motivated by research for Agha Mohammad Shah Qajar. In his memoir, Hagverdiyev writes that between 1906 and 1913, he traveled throughout the Caucasus, Turkestan, and Iran, and spent time in Mazandaran gathering materials for the play.

In 1908, he directed the staging of Uzeyir Hajibeyov's Leyli and Majnun opera and conducted the orchestra, becoming the first recognized Azerbaijani opera conductor. After the performance, he reportedly told Hajibeyov: "Thank you, my son, you have brought pride to our people. Opera has emerged in our culture."

In 1910, Hagverdiyev went to Astrakhan due to his job at the Caspian Shipping Company and collaborated with exiled Nariman Narimanov in cultural activities. He helped form a Young Man theater troupe under the Shura-yi Islam charitable society, where they staged several plays. Later, during a short trip to Ashgabat, he organized a performance for charity and also took on acting roles.

In 1911, he attended the centenary celebration of Mirza Fatali Akhundov and wrote the play Hallucinations (Xəyalat), which was staged in Baku and Tbilisi to positive reception.

After resigning from his position in 1911, Hagverdiyev moved to Aghdam, where he lived until 1916 under difficult conditions. In a letter to his cousin Huseyn Mamayev, he described his isolation and financial struggles, expressed interest in a short history of Azerbaijani theater, and noted his work at the Açıq Söz newspaper and the publication of his story Sheikh Shaban (Şeyx Şəban). He also mentioned receiving an offer to serve as deputy director at a planned Muslim theological seminary in Tbilisi.

Kamran Mammadov writes that during his time in Aghdam, Hagverdiyev frequently visited nearby villages, supported local communities, and remained intellectually active, contributing to Molla Nasreddin and continuing his fiction writing. Some of his stories from the My Deer (Marallarım) cycle were composed during this period.

=== Activity in Tbilisi ===
According to his own autobiography, Abdurrahim bey Hagverdiyev lived and worked in Georgia from 1916 to 1919. He was initially invited to Tbilisi in 1916 to serve as editor of the Russian-language monthly journal Bulletin of the Caucasus Branch of the Union of Cities. In 1917, he wrote the short stories Röya (Dream) and Hemşehri Passportu (Fellow Citizen's Passport). Following the February Revolution, Hagverdiyev was elected to both the Tbilisi Community Committee and its Central Council, due to his prior status as a representative from the Caucasus to the Constituent Assembly.

In March 1918, he was appointed commissioner for the Borchali district, where he actively mediated between Armenians and Azerbaijanis during a period of ethnic conflict, visiting villages on both sides to encourage peace. During his tenure, he narrowly escaped an assassination attempt in Ashagy Saral station, prompting his return to Tbilisi. There, he served briefly as an inspector in a newly opened Azerbaijani school and was later elected to the Georgian Parliament by the Muslim National Council. Although he served only four months, he played a vital role in promoting Azerbaijani cultural and linguistic rights, especially in Borchali.

Hagverdiyev remained engaged in cultural work. In 1919, he founded the Turkish Dramatic Society under the People's House named after K. Y. Zubalov. This initiative helped preserve Azerbaijani theater in Tbilisi during politically unstable times.

=== Activity in the Azerbaijan Democratic Republic ===
Following the establishment of the ADR in 1918, Hagverdiyev was summoned to Baku to work in the newly formed Ministry of Foreign Affairs. Due to his intellectual breadth, linguistic fluency (particularly in Russian and French), and understanding of global political dynamics, he was considered highly qualified for diplomatic missions. In early 1919, he was appointed the Republic's representative to the North Caucasus Mountain Republic. However, his tenure was short-lived: General Denikin expelled him from Dagestan, prompting his return to Baku.

Later that year, Hagverdiyev was appointed envoy to Armenia, where he reported on anti-Turkic atrocities and represented Azerbaijani interests before foreign missions. His reports and archival documents from this period reflect his active engagement in humanitarian and diplomatic efforts. He resigned from the position in March 1920, shortly before the Bolshevik takeover.

Alongside political activity, he co-founded the Azerbaijani Actors' Union in 1918, which revitalized theatrical life by fostering the production of new works and supporting performers.

=== Post-April Occupation Activity ===
Following the establishment of Bolshevik rule, Abdurrahim bey Hagverdiyev first worked at the People's Commissariat for Foreign Affairs and then moved to the People's Commissariat for Education. In 1920, the Azerbaijani theater scene was unified, nationalized, and brought under state patronage. The United State Theater was established, and the burned-down Taghiyev Theater was restored. In 1921, the Satirical-Propaganda Theater (Satiragit) was founded. Hagverdiyev headed the arts department and served as commissioner for state theaters, devoting himself to the organization of performances and the development of national theater and acting. He also continued writing stories and short plays, which were staged at the Satiragit Theater.

During this time, he was appointed secretary at the Faculty of Oriental Studies at the State University, a position he held for ten years, later teaching Azerbaijani Turkish to foreign students at the Medical Institute. In his 1933 autobiography, he confirmed this teaching role.

In 1922, a commemorative evening was held in Baku marking the 30th anniversary of his literary work, with speeches and theatrical performances. A year later, under his leadership, the 50th anniversary of Azerbaijani national theater was celebrated. A booklet on the history of Azerbaijani theater was published in conjunction with the event.

Hagverdiyev became deputy chairman and later (1923–1925) chairman of the Azerbaijan Society for Research and Study (Tədqiq və Tətəbbö). He played an active role in establishing regional studies courses and delivered lectures in Azerbaijani and Russian titled Studying the Past of Azerbaijan (Azərbaycanın keçmişinin öyrənilməsi). In 1924, at his initiative, a group of scholars was sent to Moscow and Leningrad to collect historical sources, resulting in the creation of a library in Baku focused on Azerbaijani culture, geography, history, and folklore. In January 1924, Hagverdiyev was elected a corresponding member of the Regional Studies Bureau under the Russian Academy of Sciences and participated as a delegate in the First Congress on Regional Studies held in Baku that September.

That same year, he was elected a corresponding member of the Bureau of Regional Studies under the Russian Academy of Sciences and participated in the First Congress on Regional Studies in Baku.

In 1927, a jubilee commission was formed to mark the 35th anniversary of his public and literary work. Numerous articles and lectures about his life and contributions appeared in regional newspapers, especially Yeni Fikir and Zarya Vostoka. According to literary critic Aziz Sharif, this jubilee greatly stimulated academic interest in Hagverdiyev's works.

The celebrations began in Tbilisi and concluded in Baku. In February 1927, a formal event was held at the Rustaveli Theater in Tbilisi with performances, concerts, and tributes by prominent Azerbaijani and Georgian artists.

In 1928, he was awarded the title of "Honored Art Worker". That same year, he actively contributed to the 50th anniversary commemorations for Mirza Fatali Akhundov, writing articles and giving lectures. In 1929, he led a group of writers to Tbilisi for the event, followed by another visit in 1930 to attend the Soviet Writers' Plenum. That year, his satirical work Letters from Hell by a Ghoul (Xortdanın cəhənnəm məktubları) was published in Latin script.

In 1931, he suffered a serious injury after falling in icy conditions in Tbilisi. Despite hospitalization, he soon returned to work and expressed hope to relocate again to Tbilisi.

In his 1932 letter to Aziz Sharif, he spoke of personal challenges and hoped to be awarded the title of "People's Writer" to qualify for retirement. He planned to relocate to Tbilisi and find lighter duties. Despite illness, he continued teaching and contributing to theater.

According to actor Hajiagha Abbasov, during a 1932 meeting with fellow artists, Hagverdiyev encouraged them to train young talents and spoke of his wish to translate several of Shakespeare's plays into Azerbaijani—an endeavor he regretted being unable to pursue due to his deteriorating health.

== Death ==
On May 3, 1932, a modest ceremony was held at the Turkic Theater in Baku to mark the 40th anniversary of Abdurrahim bey Hagverdiyev's literary career. In line with his wishes, the event was simple and unceremonious, featuring a three-act performance from Pəri cadu and a brief concert. Dadash Bunyadzade promised him a decent pension, which encouraged Hagverdiyev to consider retiring by October 1 if the pension were secured. He expressed a sense of alienation as an aging teacher surrounded by much younger colleagues. However, this promise never materialized, and he continued working without receiving a proper pension. On December 11, 1933, Hagverdiyev died from heart disease and was buried at the Alley of Honor in Baku.

== Family ==
After returning from St. Petersburg to Shusha, Hagverdiyev married Tukazban khanum in 1900. She was the daughter of his maternal uncle, Mamo bey. Though the marriage was arranged, he always treated her with great respect. Tukazban shared with him numerous fairy tales learned from her grandmother, which proved valuable for his folklore research. Notably, the plot of The Fairy Magic was based on a tale called Red don she had recounted. Her extensive knowledge of oral tradition often surprised him.

In the Soviet period, Hagverdiyev remarried a Polish-born pianist named Yevgenia Osipovna. He had no children from either marriage. However, he raised his close relative Hüseyn Mamayev as a foster son, even sending him to Moscow for education. Mamayev also acted in some of Hagverdiyev's theatrical productions.

== Creative work ==
Abdurrahim bey Hagverdiyev began his literary career while studying at the Shusha Realschule. The works of the renowned playwright Mirza Fatali Akhundov had a profound influence on him, and as an early writing attempt, he tried to compose a play titled Haji Dashdamir, modeled after Akhundov's comedy Haji Gara (1883). Before launching his professional literary activity with dramatic works in the late 19th century, Hagverdiyev also translated several short pieces from Russian literature. In his autobiography, he writes:

While studying at the Realschule, in 1887, I translated a few of Krylov's fables into Azerbaijani in verse. As it was my first work, I ask for forgiveness.

During his studies at the Tiflis Realschule, he wrote a five-act drama titled Spilled Blood (Nahaq qan). However, he later noted that only three acts remained, as he had lost the other two. Thus, prior to pursuing higher education in St. Petersburg, Hagverdiyev's literary activity was limited to a few poetic translations and two dramatic works (Haji Dashdamir, and Spilled Blood).

Nevertheless, researchers consider the true beginning of his literary life to coincide with his years of education in St. Petersburg. There, he became acquainted with the city's rich literary and cultural environment, which significantly influenced his artistic development. During these nine years, he studied Russian and Western literature closely and frequently attended the theatre to further his self-education.

In 1892, he began his professional literary career with the play You Will Taste the Goose Meat and Feel Its Delight (Yeyərsən Qaz Ətini, Görərsən Ləzzətini) and continued in 1896 with The Broken Union (Dağılan Tifaq).

Over forty years, Hagverdiyev authored short stories, plays, feuilletons, librettos, scientific essays, and satirical articles. Researchers divide his career into three periods:

— First period (1892–1905)

— Second period (1905–1920)

— Third period (1920–1933)

First Period of Creativity

After writing You Shall Taste the Goose and Know Its Delight and The Broken Union in St. Petersburg, Hagverdiyev returned to Azerbaijan. While in Baku, he wrote The Unlucky Young Man (Bəxtsiz Cavan) and later Fairy Magic (Pəri Cadu). Recognized initially as a playwright, he depicted scenes from the lives of peasants and landlords in this period, sharply criticizing the exploiting class.

His first comedy, You Shall Taste the Goose and Know Its Delight, portrays the tragicomic events in a merchant's family. Among other issues, the play critiques polygamy, a prominent societal issue at the time. Scholars argue that with this play, Hagverdiyev enriched the dramatic genre pioneered by Akhundov with new themes and characters.

Several years later, he wrote The Broken Union, considered a classic of Azerbaijani theatre. The play was strongly influenced by the Shusha environment, and Hagverdiyev closely observed the lifestyle of the local bey and aga classes. The young writer portrayed the downfall and hardships of characters like Najaf bey and his companions.

In 1900, Hagverdiyev wrote The Unlucky Young Man, further developing his critique of the upper classes. Through the character Farhad, an enlightened intellectual, he conveyed his democratic ideals. Farhad, unlike the traditional elite, fought against social customs and advocated for education as a means to uplift the peasantry. The play marks the beginning of portraying landlords as opponents of progress and education in Azerbaijani drama.

His final work of this period, Fairy Magic, differs thematically from his earlier plays. It introduced mythological figures such as fairies, demons, and the devil, turning abstract concepts like sorcery into dramatic characters. The narrative is built around the struggle between good and evil. The central character, a woman named Fairy, seeks revenge against all men after her divorce and turns to dark powers. But she eventually falls in love with a young man named Gurban, and her desire for revenge is subdued. The play juxtaposes symbolic and realistic characters to critique social injustice and class divisions. Unlike earlier works, this play highlights the struggle of a poor family against wealthy oppressors.

Second period of creativity

As Hagverdiyev himself noted, the second period of his career was when he worked "shoulder to shoulder with revolutionary-democratic artists like Mirza Jalil and Sabir." Literary scholars agree that this stage reflects a shift from enlightenment realism to critical realism. This transition began with the 1905 Revolution, after which freedom and workers' and peasants' rights became central literary themes. The emergence of a free press followed. Among the new periodicals was Molla Nasreddin, published in Tiflis from 1906 by Jalil Mammadguluzadeh. This journal quickly gained popularity in Turkey, Uzbekistan, Turkmenistan, Tatarstan, Dagestan, Crimea, and Iran. Azerbaijani realist intellectuals gathered around the publication. Until 1905, Hagverdiyev had been known primarily as a playwright, but he later became one of Molla Nasreddin's key contributors.

His first satirical work, the comedy Friends of the Nation (Millət Dostları), written in 1905, marked the beginning of this new stage. In it, he criticized the so-called intellectuals of his time, a common theme among Molla Nasreddin contributors. The play is considered a prime example of the vaudeville genre.

He also completed his historical drama Agha Muhammad Shah Qajar (Ağa Məhəmməd Şah Qacar) during this period. Completed in 1907, Hagverdiyev conducted archival research in St. Petersburg and Mazandaran for the play. The work is regarded as the second historical tragedy in Azerbaijani literature. In this play, he presented the Qajar ruler with psychological depth and historical realism. At the request of his friend, the actor Huseyngulu Arablinski, he excluded female characters due to the lack of available actresses for stage performance.

From this period onward, Hagverdiyev increasingly employed satire, using various techniques to criticize bourgeois failings and social ills. His stories The Delirious Notebook (Mürtüb dəftəri) and Comrade Passport (Həmşəri pasportu) exemplify this. Irony became a key tool in his artistic approach.

His primary activity in this period was writing for Molla Nasreddin. Beginning in January 1907, he contributed for nearly two decades. Alongside poets and writers such as Sabir, Mirza Jalil, Ali Nazmi, and Salman Mumtaz, Hagverdiyev played a leading role. The editorial team divided tasks: Jalil Mammadguluzadeh wrote feuilletons, Mirza Alakbar Sabir composed satirical poems, and Hagverdiyev contributed satirical stories. He wrote under pseudonyms such as "Ceyranali", "Xortdan", "Laghlagi", "Mozalan", "Nuni Sagir", and "Supurgesaggal". His satirical series Letters from Hell (Cəhənnəm Məktubları), My Deer (Marallarım), and Mozalan Bey's Travelogue (Mozalan Bəyin Səyahətnaməsi) were all published in Molla Nasreddin.

Third Period of Creativity

The third phase of Hagverdiyev's literary work began in the 1920s and lasted until the end of his life. This period was shaped by the literary constraints imposed under Soviet rule. Writers could no longer address topics freely. Hagverdiyev instead focused on works reflecting socialist ideals and carrying didactic themes. His plays In the Shadow of the Tree (Ağac Kölgəsində), The Old Pipe (Köhnə Dudman), Comrade Koroglu (Yoldaş Koroğlu), The Doors of Justice (Ədalət Qapıları), and stories like Revenge (Qisas), Lantern (Qəndil), and Struggle with Capitalism (Kapitalizmlə Mübarizə) belong to this period.

In his Soviet-era works, the focus shifted to peasants and young intellectuals liberated from feudal oppression. The historical play The Old Pipe (1927), considered one of his most powerful works, depicts events from 19th-century khanate-era Azerbaijan. It was followed by Homeland of the Ancestors (Baba Yurdu), showing peasants rebelling against figures like Cahangir Agha, ultimately triumphing—a narrative aligning with Soviet ideals.

In In the Shadow of the Tree (1921), the conflict between Mustafa bey and poor villager Jafar is resolved when the teacher Karim sarcastically shows Jafar's corpse to the aghas, proclaiming: "He hasn't died, don't worry—he's fallen asleep and will awaken in a different world, a world of revenge."

Hagverdiyev also advocated for women's liberation. In Women's Holiday (Qadınlar Bayramı, 1928), the protagonist aunt Cahan spearheads reforms in her village. A school, a literacy course, and a nursery are established. She is portrayed as the new Soviet woman—emancipated and active in public life. Very Beautiful (Çox Gözəl, 1932) reflects themes of civic spirit and brotherhood. It was Hagverdiyev's last short drama. In The Red Granny (Qırmızı Qarı, 1921), a positive character, the granny itself, is portrayed as a "messenger of the red revolution", yearning to end the chains and tyranny. The play concludes with soldiers triumphing over the dark regime, fulfilling the storm's wish.

His short Soviet-era plays were among the first performed under the new government. During this time, he also produced short stories that, unlike earlier satirical works, focused on the hardships of the people and the oppression of the Tsarist regime.

In the final stage of his career, both his original writings and translations from Western and Russian literature gained importance. In the 1920s, he translated Maxim Gorky's stories "Old Woman Izergil", "Makar Chudra", "Grandfather Arkhip and Lyonka", and "The Khan and His Son"; Chekhov's "A Dreadful Night", "The Secret", "The Lion and the Sun"; Andersen's "The Nightingale", "The Emperor's New Clothes"; Schiller's The Robbers; and Emile Zola's The Miners into Azerbaijani Turkish.

His scholarly articles from the Soviet period are also significant. Among them are studies on Maxim Gorky, Mirza Fatali Akhundov, and the Azerbaijani theatre. Hagverdiyev not only wrote the 1912 work Khayalat about Akhundov but also conducted extensive research on his life and literary contributions. His essays on the formation of Azerbaijani theatre later became key sources for theatre scholars.

== Publicistic works ==
A part of Abdurrahim bəy Hagverdiyev's creative works consists of publicistic works. Despite living and working in Tbilisi, the geographic scope of his publicistic writings spans a broad area including Baku, Iran, Nakhchivan, Yerevan, Saint Petersburg, Nizhny Novgorod, Germany, Shusha, Vladikavkaz, Aghdam, and Ganja. In his works published in early 20th-century newspapers such as "Hummat", "Irshad", "Taze hayat", and "Gruziya", Hagverdiyev addressed issues of education, culture, schools, social progress, and women's emancipation. His writings promoted democratic enlightenment ideas to the masses, criticized social apathy and stagnation, and called for civic activism and patriotism for the moral and ethical development of society.

In 1906, he authored his first stories, "Father and Son" ("Ata və oğul") and "Witness of the Moon" ("Ayın şahidliyi"), which were published in the newspaper "Hayat". In October 1905, a one-act comedy titled "Friends of the Nation" ("Millət dostları") also appeared in the same newspaper.

In May 1907, in an article titled "Bizim yabılıgımız" published in "Taze hayat", Hagverdiyev criticized the indifferent individuals who abandoned the enlightenment efforts, comparing the nation's pioneers to "yabı" (a traditional sheepskin coat). He lamented the long-term "yabıq" state of the Muslim people, deprived of intellectual and cultural nourishment for centuries, oppressed by figures like Pobedonostsev and Ilminski who kept them subdued.

Although Hagverdiyev published articles in Baku newspapers such as "Taze hayat" and "Irshad", his most prolific period as a publicist coincided with his collaboration with the journal "Molla Nasreddin". Starting from January 1907, he became known for his series "Letters from Hell" ("Cəhənnəm Məktubları") published in the journal. To compile these stories, he traveled extensively from village to village, capturing events that caught his attention. In these works, Hagverdiyev adopted a critical stance against ignorance and exploitation. His characters in "Hell", such as "Hacı Mirzə", "Əhməd Ağa", and "Fazil Dərbəndi", represent false clerics who oppress villagers through various means and perpetuate superstition.

From 1908, Hagverdiyev authored a major part of "Mozalan Bey's Travelogue" ("Mozalan Bəyin Səyahətnaməsi"), serialized in the journal. He informed readers about this work on the first anniversary of C. Məmmədquluzadə's death. In his memoirs, Hagverdiyev noted that in response to İbrahim bəy's travels, he and his friends Omar Faig Nemanzadeh, Salman Mumtaz, and Gurbanəli Sharifzadeh decided to write "Mozalan Bey's Travelogue" together. Hagverdiyev started the first installment, bringing Mozalan to Baku; Salman took him to Mashhad, while Qurbanəli traveled with him through Yerevan and Nakhchivan.

During his time at "Molla Nasreddin", Hagverdiyev published the book "Two Stories" ("İki Hekayət") in 1909. Besides fictional works, he also wrote memoir-style articles expressing his impressions of his contemporaries Mirza Ali-Akbar Sabir and Aligulu Nacafzadeh Gemkusar in pieces titled "Two Years" ("İki il") and "Five Years" ("Beş il"). These works reflect his sorrow and regret over their absence and emphasize the lasting influence of their ideas among the people.

His short article "On the Art of Acting" ("Artistlik sənəti haqqında"), recommended to the actor Sidgi Ruhulla, highlights acting as a noble service to nation and culture. Hagverdiyev notes that the actor sweetens bitter truths with the sugar of art to the public, stressing its social impact.

His article "My Memories About Molla Nasreddin" ("Molla Nasreddin haqqında xatiratım") shares reminiscences about the 25-year history of the journal and its publisher Mirzə Cəlil. Hagverdiyev praises Mirzə Cəlil's unwavering commitment and the journal's unique role in Azerbaijani literature, discussing its influence on Shusha's socio-political and literary life and its reception by Shusha's intellectuals.

Opposing "Hurriyyeti-nisvan" (Women's Freedom) advocates, certain religious scholars and journalists supported the view that Muslim women should remain secluded, veiled, without rights, and dependent on men ("Təsəttüri-nisvan"). Since 1914, literary debates between supporters of "Molla Nasreddin" and the journal "Şəlalə" intensified around women's rights. Hagverdiyev was active in this debate, publishing six articles under the title "On Tesetturi-nisvan" ("Təsəttüri-Nisvana Dair") expressing his support for women's freedom and criticizing the inconsistency and self-interest of opponents.

Stories

Besides being a playwright, Hagverdiyev made a significant contribution to Azerbaijani literature with his distinctive narrative style. His "My Deer" ("Marallarım") series, inspired by travel memoirs like "Letters from Hell by a Ghoul " ("Xortdanın cəhənnəm məktubları"), his post-revolution satirical stories such as "New Medicine" ("Yeni təbabət") and "The Hog" ("Qaban"), and works like "Donation" ("İanə") and "The Yellow Chicken" ("Sarı toyuq") attracted readers' attention. These stories played an important role in the development of Azerbaijani Soviet prose in the 1920s–30s, influencing authors such as Mir Cəlal and Sabit Rəhman. Hagverdiyev criticized bourgeois mistakes and social maladies through various satirical forms, as seen in "The Delirious Notebook" ("Mürtüb dəftəri") and "Comrade Passport" ("Həmşəri pasportu").

A unique feature of his stories is the use of digressions to clarify the theme for readers. Stories like "Pir", "House of Seyids" ("Seyidlər ocağı"), "Recitation" ("Qiraət"), and "Letters from Hell" ("Cəhənnəm məktubları") include digressions that enrich the text by describing old city houses, customs, nomadic life, pre-October Revolution theater, and tricks played by pilgrims and religious figures.

Some of his stories include:

"Father and Son" ("Ata və oğul"), "Witness of the Moon" ("Ayın şahidliyi"), "Letters from Hell by a Ghoul " ("Xortdanın cəhənnəm məktubları"), "Mozalan Bey's Travelogue" ("Mozalanbəyin səyahətnaməsi"), "Bomb" ("Bomba"), "My Deer" ("Marallarım"), "Instead of Introduction" ("Müqəddimə əvəzinə"), "The Delirious Notebook" ("Mürtüb dəftəri"), "Complaint" ("Şikayət"), "Deccalabad" ("Dəccalabad"), "The Green-headed Swan" ("Yaşılbaş sona"), "Recitation" ("Qiraət"), "Shabbih" ("Şəbih"), "Pir", "Critique" ("Tənqid"), "The Doctor from Hunger" ("Acından təbib"), "Sheikh Shaban" ("Şeyx Şəban"), "Comrade Passport" ("Həmşəri pasportu"), "Dream" ("Röya"), "Mirza Safar" ("Mirzə Səfər"), "Past Days" ("Keçmiş günlər"), "On Top of the High Mountain" ("Uca dağ başında"), "House of Seyids" ("Seyidlər ocağı"), "Candle" ("Qəndil"), "Fountain" ("Çeşmək"), "The Existing Truth" ("Haqq Mövcud"), "Dog's Game" ("İt oyunu"), "Toothache" ("Diş ağrısı"), "Old Tarzen" ("Qoca tarzən"), "Struggle with Capitalism" ("Kapitalizmlə mübarizə"), "The Hog" ("Qaban"), "Conversation" ("Söhbət"), "Disaster" ("Müsibət"), "Hunter Gasim" ("Ovçu Qasım"), "Revenge" ("Qisas"), "Bailiff and Thief" ("Pristav və oğru"), "Donation" ("İanə"), "New Medicine" ("Yeni təbabət"), "The Yellow Chicken" ("Sarı toyuq"), "Koroglu" ("Koroğlu"). He wrote more than 80 stories in total.

Articles

Hagverdiyev's articles have been published since 1905 in journals and newspapers including "Molla Nasreddin", "Irshad", "Taze hayat", "Kaspi", "Sənayei Nefise", "Kommunist", "Dan Ulduzu", "Revolyusiya i Kultura", "Maarif worker", and "Literature" A major theme was theater. He wrote about the development of theater in Azerbaijan and its folk traditions in articles such as "Theater in Azerbaijan" ("Azərbaycanda Teatr"), "People's Performances and Religious Dramas in Azerbaijan" ("Azərbaycanda Xalq Tamaşaları və Dini Dramlar"), and "Notes on The Fairy Magic" ("Pəri cadu haqqında qeydlər"). He also discussed Mirza Fatali Akhundzadeh, the founder of modern Azerbaijani theater, in articles including "The Life and Work of M.F. Akhundov" ("M. F. Axundovun hayat və Fəaliyyəti"), "The Tragedy of Mirza Fatali" ("Mirzə Fətəlini faciəsi"), and "Mirza Fatali and the Arabic Alphabet" ("Mirzə Fətəli və ərəb əlifbası").

Notable articles include: "Bizim yabılıgımız", "Criticism of Criticism" ("Tənqidə tənqid"), "Two Years" ("İki il"), "On Tasatturi-nisvan" ("Təcəttüri-nisvana dair"), "Theater among Muslims" ("Müsəlmanlarda teatro"), "Five Years" ("Beş il"), "Notes on The Fairy Magic" ("Pəri cadu haqqında qeydlər"), "On the Art of Acting" ("Artistlik sənəti haqqında"), "About Abbas Mirza Sharifzade" ("Abbas Mirzə Şərifzadə haqqında"), "The Tragedy of Mirza Fatali" ("Mirzə Fətəlinin faciəsi"), and "About Our Literary Language" ("Ədəbi dilimiz haqqında").

Filmography

- "My Deer" ("Marallarım") (film, 1963)
- "I Want to Get Married" ("Evlənmək istəyirəm") (film, 1983)
- "Greedy Scholars" ("Ac həriflər") (film, 1993) (full-length film, AzTV) — author of the original work

== Works ==
- Dağılan Tifaq (in Azerbaijani). Saint Petersburg: İlyas Buraganski mətbəəsi. 1899. p. 46.
- Millət Dostları (in Azerbaijani). Tbilisi: Qeyrət Şirkəti mətbəəsi. 1907. p. 22.
- Kimdir Müqəssir (in Azerbaijani). Baku: Kaspi mətbəəsi. 1909. p. 38.
- İki Hekayət (in Azerbaijani). Baku: Orucov Qardaşları mətbəəsi. 1909. p. 62.
- Ac Həriflər (in Azerbaijani). Baku: Orucov Qardaşları mətbəəsi. 1911. p. 32.
- Xəyalət (in Azerbaijani). Baku: Orucov Qardaşları mətbəəsi. 1911. p. 23.
- Ağa Məhəmməd Şah Qacar (in Azerbaijani). Baku: Orucov Qardaşları mətbəəsi. 1912. p. 71.
- Padşahın Məhəbbəti (in Azerbaijani). Baku: Azərb. Xalq Maarif Komissarlığı, Ali-Siyasi Maarif İdarəsinin Nəşriyyatı. 1923. p. 12.
- Padşahın Məhəbbəti (in Azerbaijani). Baku: Azərb. Xalq Maarif Komissarlığı, Ali-Siyasi Maarif İdarəsinin Nəşriyyatı. 1925. p. 16.
- Ağa Məhəmməd Şah Qacar (in Azerbaijani). Baku: Azərnəşr. 1926. p. 87.
- Ağac Kölgəsində (in Azerbaijani). Baku: Bakı İşçisi Kooperativ Nəşriyyatı. 1926. p. 23.
- Vaveyla (in Azerbaijani). Baku: Bakı İşçisi Kooperativ Nəşriyyatı. 1926. p. 18.
- Bəxtsiz Cavan (in Azerbaijani). Baku: Azərnəşr. 1926. p. 64.
- Dağılan Tifaq (in Azerbaijani). Baku: Azərnəşr. 1926. p. 62.
- Ədalət Qapıları (in Azerbaijani). Baku: Bakı Fəhləsi Kooperativ Nəşriyyatı. 1926. p. 15.
- Şeyx Şəban (in Azerbaijani). Baku: Bakı İşçisi Kooperativ Nəşriyyatı. 1926. p. 20.
- Ac Həriflər (in Azerbaijani). Baku: Azərnəşr. 1927. p. 20.
- Köhnə Dudman (in Azerbaijani). Baku: Azərnəşr. 1927. p. 99.
- Marallarım (in Azerbaijani). Baku: Azərnəşr. 1927. p. 110.
- Qadınlar Bayramı. 8 Mart (in Azerbaijani). Baku: Azərnəşr. 1928. p. 29.
- A. Qərib, ed. (1930). Xortdanın Cəhənnəm Məktubları (in Azerbaijani). Baku: Azərnəşr. p. 124.

After his death

- Sabit Rəhman, ed. (1935). Dağılan Tifaq (in Azerbaijani). Baku: Azərnəşr. p. 81.
- E. Əbulhəsən, ed. (1936). Şeyx Şəban (in Azerbaijani). Baku: Azərnəşr. p. 16.
- Marallarım (in Azerbaijani). Baku: Azərnəşr. 1937. p. 133.
- E. Aslanov, ed. (1937). Xortdanın Cəhənnəm Məktubları (in Azerbaijani). Baku: Azərnəşr. p. 145.
- E. Aslanov, ed. (1937). Şəbi (in Azerbaijani). Baku: Azərnəşr. p. 34.
- İ. Əliyev, ed. (1938). Marallarım (in Azerbaijani). Baku: Azərnəşr. p. 110.
- Pyeslər və Hekayələr (in Azerbaijani). Baku: Azərnəşr. 1938. p. 15.
- Mir Celal, ed. (1941). Hekayələr (ərəb əlifbası ilə) (in Azerbaijani). Baku: Azərnəşr. p. 114.
- Əsərləri (in Azerbaijani). Baku: SSRİ EA Azərbaycan Filialı Nizami ad. Ədəbiyyat və Dil İn-tu. 1941. p. 317.
- Kamran Məmmədov, ed. (1948). Hekayələr və Tərcümələr (in Azerbaijani). Baku: Uşaqgəncnəşr. p. 112.
- C. Mecnunbeyov, ed. (1949). Qoca Tarzən (in Azerbaijani). Baku: Uşaqgəncnəşr. p. 16.
- İ. Əfəndiyev, ed. (1949). Xortdanın Cəhənnəm Məktubları (in Azerbaijani) (3rd ed.). Baku: Azərnəşr. p. 142.
- E. Vəliyev, ed. (1950). Mirzə Səfər (in Azerbaijani). Baku: Uşaqgəncnəşr. p. 88.
- E. Babayev, ed. (1951). Hekayələr (Orta məktəb şagirdləri üçün) (in Azerbaijani). Baku: Uşaqgəncnəşr. p. 38.
- G. Kazımov, ed. (1953). Xəyalət (in Azerbaijani). Baku: Respublika Xalq Yaradıcılığı Evi və Respublika Mədəni Maarif İşləri Metodkabinəsi. p. 20.
- K. Hasanzadə, ed. (1954). Hekayələr (in Azerbaijani). Baku: Uşaqgəncnəşr. p. 40.
- C. Qafarlı, ed. (1955). Xortdanın Cəhənnəm Məktubları (in Azerbaijani) (4th ed.). Baku: Uşaqgəncnəşr. p. 114.
- E. Əhmədova, ed. (1958). Şeyx Şəban (in Azerbaijani). Baku: Azərnəşr. p. 44.
- R. Şıxəmirova, ed. (1959). Bəxtsiz Cavan (in Azerbaijani). Baku: Uşaqgəncnəşr. p. 67.
- Y. Məmmədov, ed. (1960). Marallarım (in Azerbaijani). Baku: Uşaqgəncnəşr. p. 107.
- K. Məmmədov, ed. (1961). Mozalan Bəyin Səyahətnaməsi (in Azerbaijani). Baku: Uşaqgəncnəşr. p. 51.
- Y. Məmmədov, ed. (1961). Xortdanın Cəhənnəm Məktubları (in Azerbaijani) (5th ed.). Baku: Uşaqgəncnəşr. p. 144.
- Sona Məmmədova, ed. (1987). Xortdanın Cəhənnəm Məktubları (in Azerbaijani). Baku: Gənclik. p. 96.
- Molla Nəsrəddin Jurnalında Səyahətnamələr (in Azerbaijani). Baku: Elm. 2007. p. 37.

== Sources ==
- Məmmədov, Kamran (1970). Əbdürrəhim bəy Haqverdiyev (in Azerbaijani). Baku: Gənclik.
- Məmmədov, Kamran (2013). Azərbaycan yazıçılarının həyatından dəqiqələr (PDF) (in Azerbaijani). Baku: Hədəf nəşrləri. ISBN 978-9952-464-76-4.
- Haqverdiyev, Əbdürrəhim (1971). "(Bədii nəsr və məqalələr), Tərcümeyi-Halım". In Məmmədov, Kamran (ed.). Seçilmiş Əsərləri (in Azerbaijani). Vol. II. Baku: Azərbaycan Dövlət Nəşriyyatı.
- Məmmədov, Məmməd (2008). Əbdürrəhim bəy Haqverdiyevin Həyat və Yaradıcılığı (PDF) (in Azerbaijani). Baku: Nurlan.
- Hacıyev, C. (1955). XX əsr Azərbaycan ədəbiyyatı tarixi (in Azerbaijani). Baku: Azərbaycan Universiteti nəşriyyatı.
- Əhmədov, Bədirxan (2011). XX əsr Azərbaycan ədəbiyyatı tarixi (in Azerbaijani). Vol. I cild. Baku: Elm və Təhsil.
- Əbdürrəhim bəy Haqverdiyev. Həyatı və yaradıcılığı (PDF) (in Azerbaijani). Baku: Elm və Təhsil. 2018. ISBN 978-9952-8176-2-1.
- Haqverdiyev, Əbdürrəhim (2005). Seçilmiş əsərləri (PDF) (in Azerbaijani). Vol. I. Baku: Lider nəşriyyatı.
- Həsənli, Cəmil (2009). Azərbaycan Xalq Cümhuriyyətinin Xarici Siyasəti (1918-1920) (PDF) (in Azerbaijani). Baku: GARISMA. ISBN 978-9952-455-00-7.
- Əhmədov, Hüseyn. "AZERBAYCAN'DA TİYATRO SANATININ GELİŞMESİNDE ÖNCÜ BİR İSİM: ABDURRAHİM BEY HAKVERDİYEV". Karadeniz Uluslararası Bilimsel Dergi. 45: 243–251.
- Şamiloğlu, Şahbaz (2010). Ə.Haqverdiyevin bioqrafiyası. Suallarla dolu 1916-1919-cu illər”, (in Azerbaijani). Baku: Qızlar Universiteti, Elmi əsərlər.
- Şərif, Əziz (1975). Keçmiş günlər (in Azerbaijani). Baku: Gəncllik.
- Rəhimli, İlham (2005). AZƏRBAYCAN TEATR TARİXİ (PDF) (in Azerbaijani). Baku: Çaşıoğlu.
- Camalov, Kamal (2015). Molla nəsrəddinçilərin maarifçilik ideyaları (in Azerbaijani). Baku: Elm və təhsil.
- QOCAYEVA, Güldəniz (2002). Nagah Xəyalıma Cəhənnəm Düşdü, (Ə. Haqverdiyevin Bədii Nəsri Mövzusunda) (in Azerbaijani). Baku: Azərbaycan Milli Ensiklopediyası Nəşriyyatı.
- Əhmədov, Hüseyn (2016). ABDURRAHİM BEY HAKVERDİYEV HAYATI – SANATI ve TİYATRO ESERLERİ (in Turkish). Izmir: T.C. EGE ÜNİVERSİTESİ SOSYAL BİLİMLER ENSTİTÜSÜ TÜRK DÜNYASI EDEBİYATI ANABİLİM DALI.
- Nağıyeva, N.P (2006). Mir Cəlal. Biblioqrafiya (PDF) (in Azerbaijani). Baku: Adiloğlu nəşriyyatı.
- ƏBDÜRRƏHİM BƏY HAQVERDİYEV (Əbdürrəhim bəy Əsəd bəy oğlu Haqverdiyev) Biblioqrafiya (PDF) (in Azerbaijani). Baku: Azərbaycan Milli Kitabxanası. 2020. ISBN 978 9952 542 16 5.
- Sarabski, Hüseynqulu (2006). Köhnə Bakı (PDF) (in Azerbaijani). Baku: Şərq-Qərb. ISBN 9952-34-008-7.
- Əsgərli, Zaman. "Əbdürrəhim bəy Haqverdiyevin Publisistikası". Journal Literature. 1. www.journal.literature.az: 106–113.
- Sultanlı, Əli; Talıbzadə, Kamal (1960). Azərbaycan Ədəbiyyatı Tarixi (in Azerbaijani). Vol. II. Baku: Azərbaycan SSR Elmlər Akademiyası Nəşriyyatı.
- Zamanov, Abbas (1953). "Realist Sənətkar". Azərbaycan jurnalı. 12.
