= Azim Azimzade =

Azerbaijani satirical artist (1880–1943)

Azim Azimzade Əzim Əzimzadə
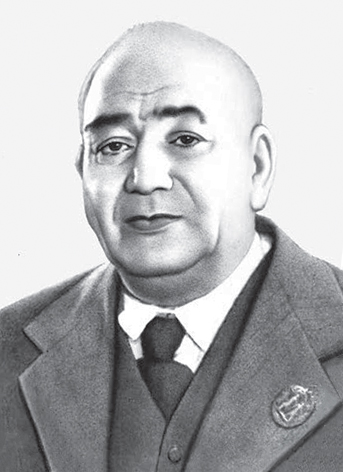
- Born: 7 May 1880; Novkhany, Baku Governorate, Russian Empire
- Died: 15 June 1943 (aged 63); Baku, Azerbaijan SSR, Soviet Union
- Known for: Artist, Caricaturist

Azim Aslan oghlu Azimzade (Azerbaijani: Əzim Aslan oğlu Əzimzadə; 7 May 1880 – 15 June 1943) was an Azerbaijani artist, satirist, and caricaturist. He was awarded the honorary title of People's Artist of the Azerbaijan SSR in 1927.

== Biography ==
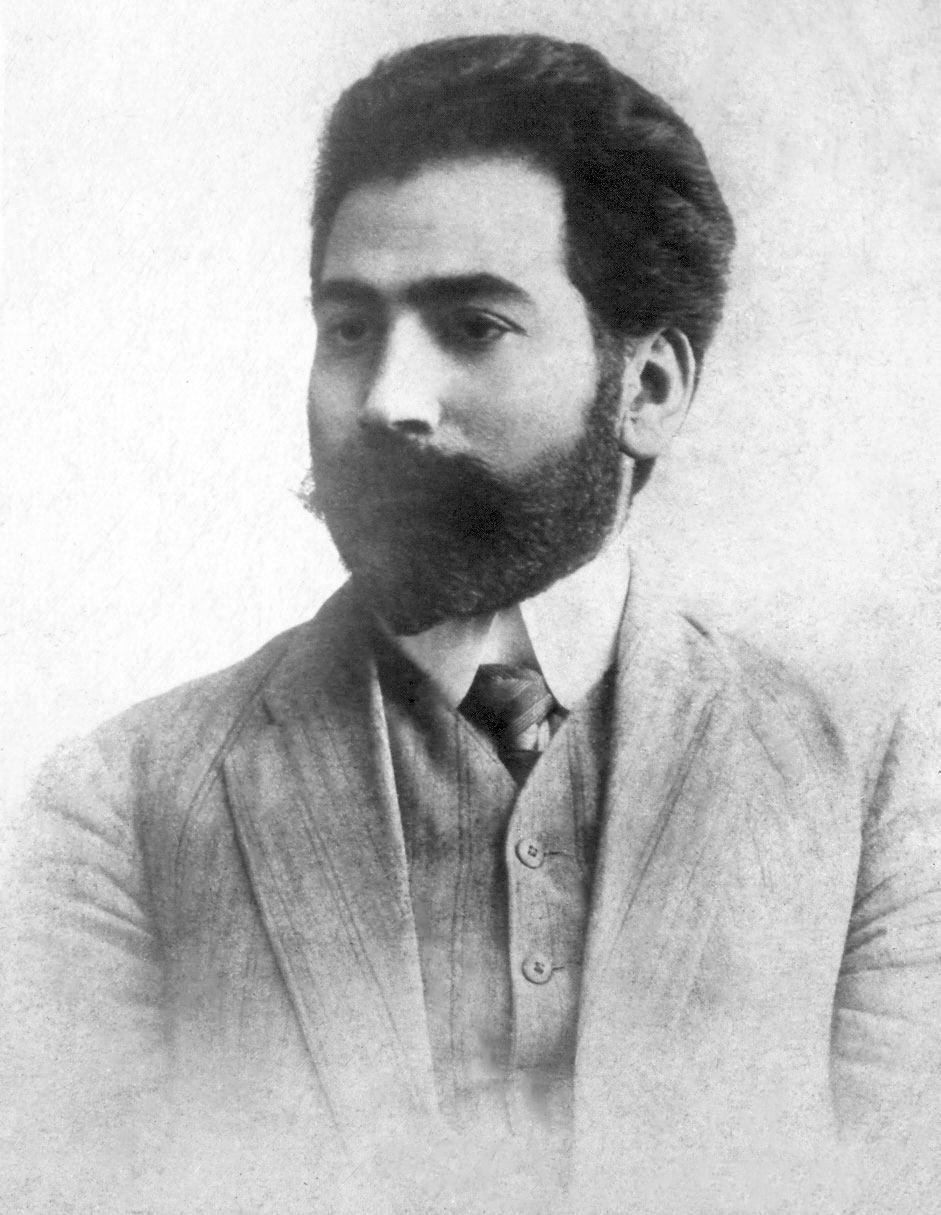
Young Azim Azimzade

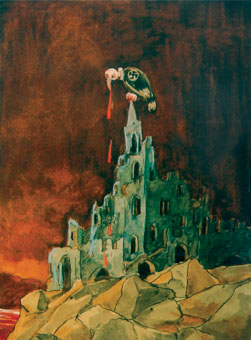
Ruins of Reichstag

Azim Azimzade was born on 7 May 1880 in the village of Novxanı in the Baku Governorate of the Russian Empire, which is now present-day Azerbaijan. The son of an oil industry worker, he had four siblings, each of whom died before the age of 10.

Azimzade received no artistic education and was self-educated; in 1906, he began publishing paintings concerning social and political issues in magazines, which represented the beginning of Azerbaijani satirical graphic art. Azimzade also actively participated in the Russian Revolution of 1905 and was the manager of the Department of Cultural Enlightenment of the People's Commissariat of Azerbaijan.

After the revolution, Azimzade published a variety of works, including a book, easel graphics, book illustrations, paintings for satirical magazines and newspapers, drafts of costumes, decorations, political caricatures and posters. Nearly half of all the posters made by Azimzade contained anti-religious themes, however he also drew posters with a more political theme, such as one published in 1925 which portrays a peasant with a fork throwing a plunderer of the nation's property away from a village.

His development of caricatures is closely related to the satirical Molla Nasraddin magazine, which was founded under ideas of the first Russian Revolution in 1905 and subsequently revived after the Russian Revolution in 1917. Azimzade worked closely with editor Jalil Mammadguluzadeh and published many illustrations and would become the chief artist of Molla Nasraddin. In 1923, he became a member of the Communist Party of the Soviet Union.

In 1927, Azimzade was awarded the honorary title of People's Artist of the Azerbaijani SSR. It is believed that he evaded political repressions due to his acquaintance with Mir Jafar Baghirov, who was the first secretary of the Azerbaijan Communist Party and an admirer of Azimzade's work.

Azimzade created 56 colored lithographs for the collected works of poet Mirza Alakbar Sabir, as well as pictures for works of Abdurrahim bey Hagverdiyev, Nariman Narimanov and Huseyngulu Sarabski. In 1927, Azimzade drew the illustrations for the children's fairy tales found in the Wild Ox poems of G.K. Sanily.

In the 1930s, Azimzade completed a thematic series of watercolors which examined social inequality, such as Wedding of the Rich People and Wedding of the Poor People. In 1933, Azimzade exhibited posters in Moscow for the first time, at an exhibition of Azerbaijani artists, which were well regarded by the central press. In 1937, he published a collection of 26 paintings entitled Shadows of the Past.

During the beginning of World War II, Azimzade actively participated in the creation of the Agitokon posters written in both Azerbaijani and Russian with other Soviet artists. Writers and poets such as S. Rahman, Y. Fidler, G. Stroganov, M. Seyidzade and Nigar Rafibeyli also collaborated with the artists on the posters. Azimzade would make a significant contribution to Soviet wartime anti-fascist caricatures, and drew more than 50 caricatures during the first two years of the war. One notable caricature Azimzade drew was called Lion and Kitten (1941), in which a caricature Adolf Hitler was ridiculed and compared to Napoleon, referencing the results of the Battle of Borodino in 1812.

Azimzade died in 1943 at the age of 63.

== Legacy ==
Baku is now home to the House-Museum of Azim Azimzade. A street in Baku, a museum, and the Artistic School of Azerbaijan,where Azimzade once taught and was director from 1932 to 1937, were all named in his honor. In 2002, a monument to Azimzade was erected near Heydar Aliyev Palace in Baku.

== Gallery ==
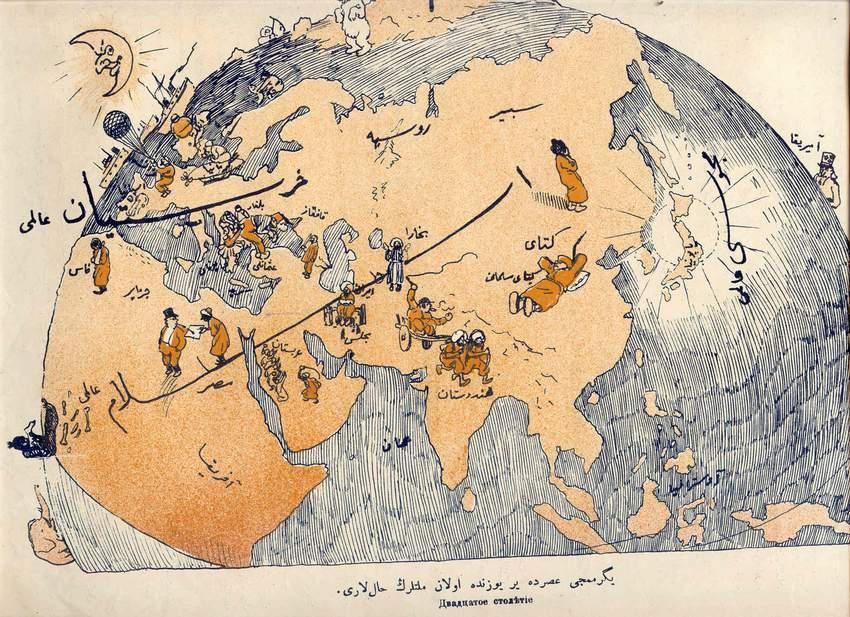
The Twentieth Century, a 1910 cartoon, representing Europe and Japan as prosperous developed civilizations and Asia as oppressed lower class. The comment in Azeri reads: "The state of the continents in the twentieth century"

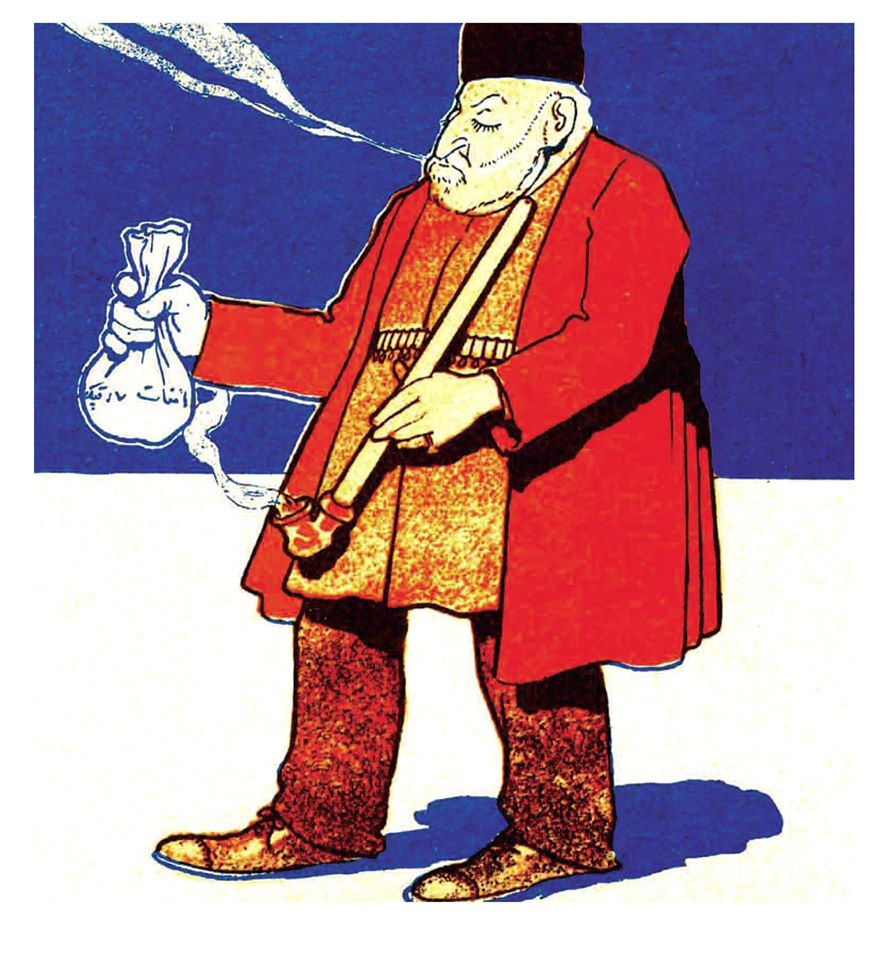
Caricature in "Molla Nasreddin" satirical magazine. 1906

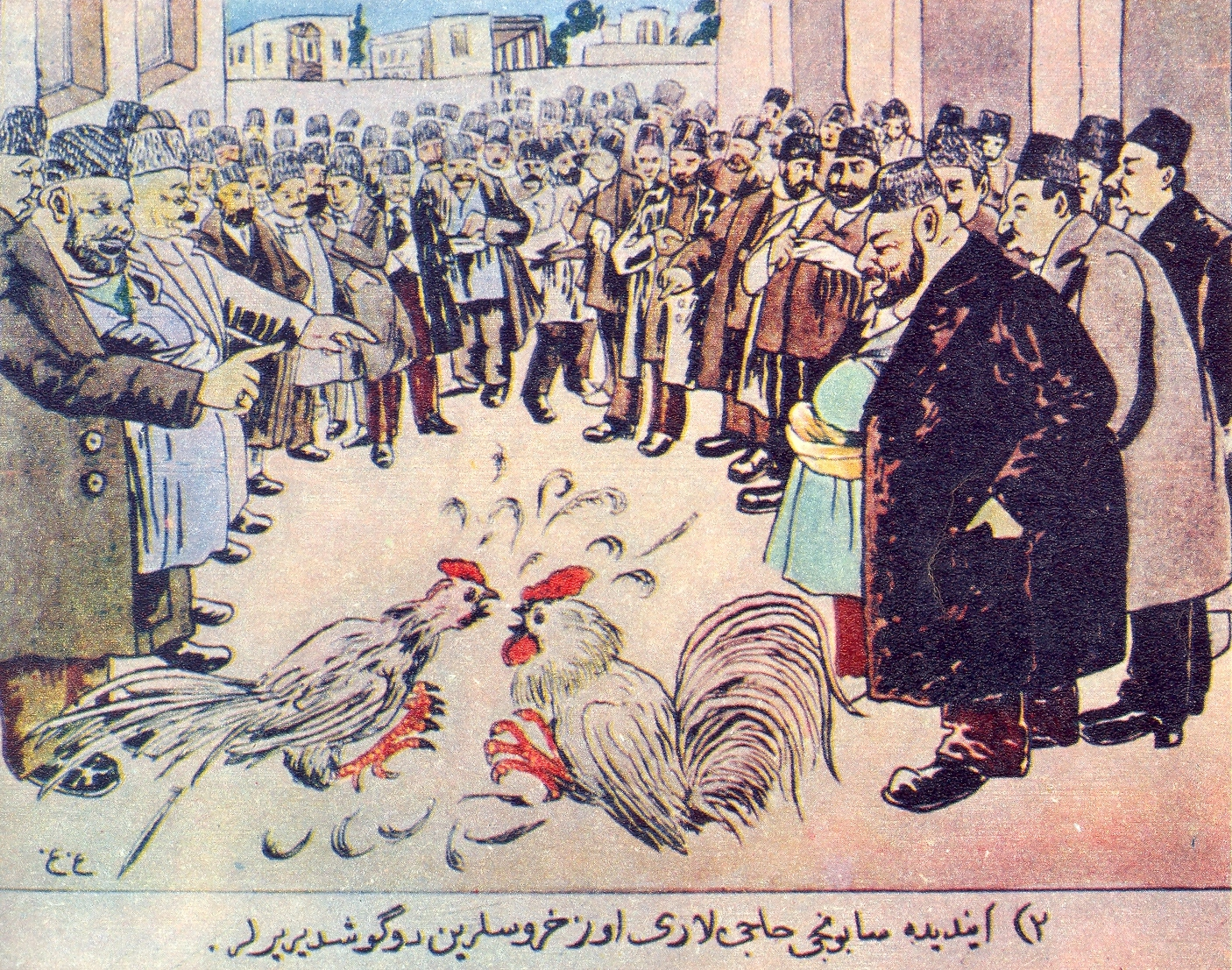
Cockfighting. 1915

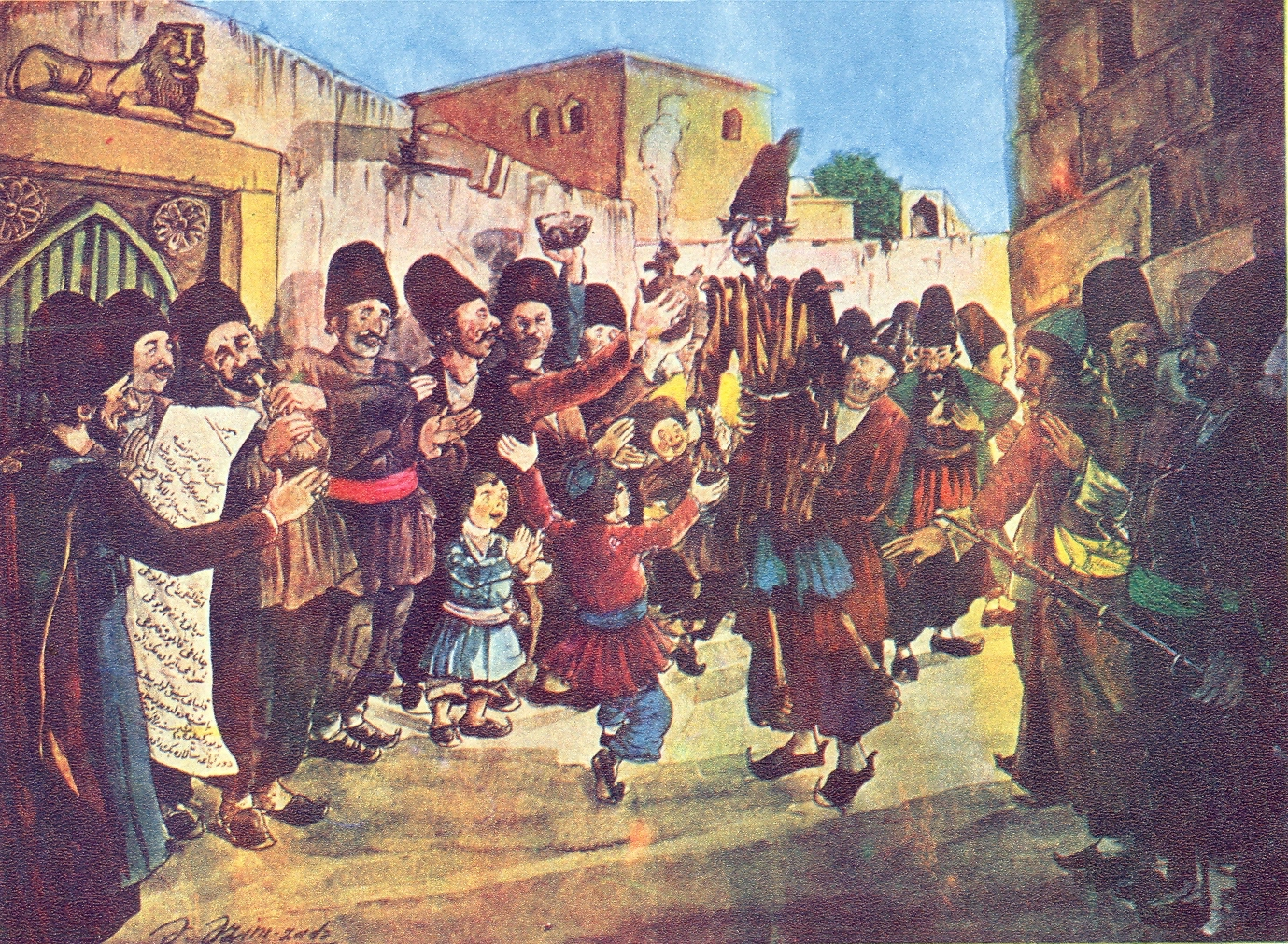
Folk performance Kos-Kosa. 1930

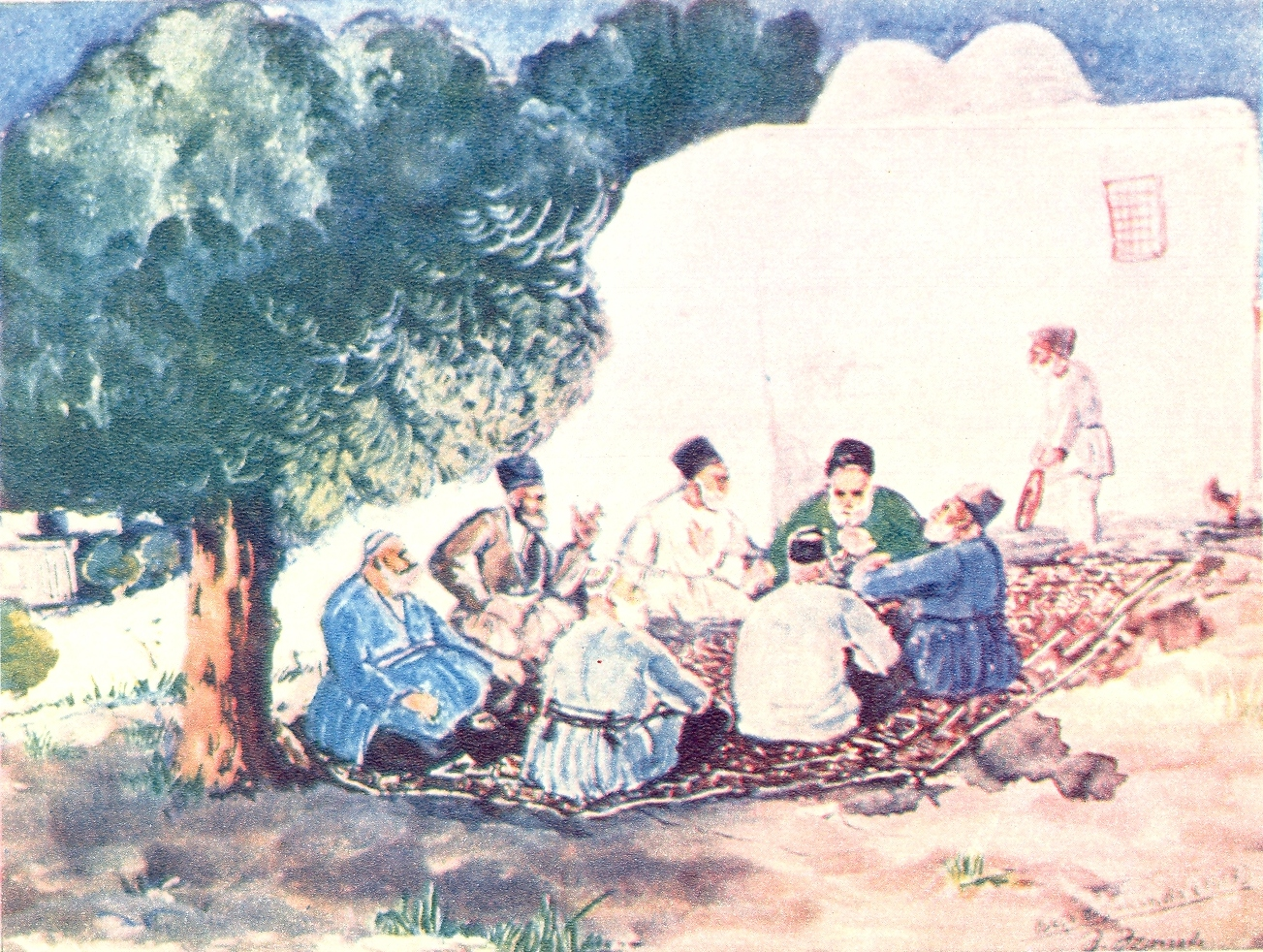
At Baku summer cottages. 1931

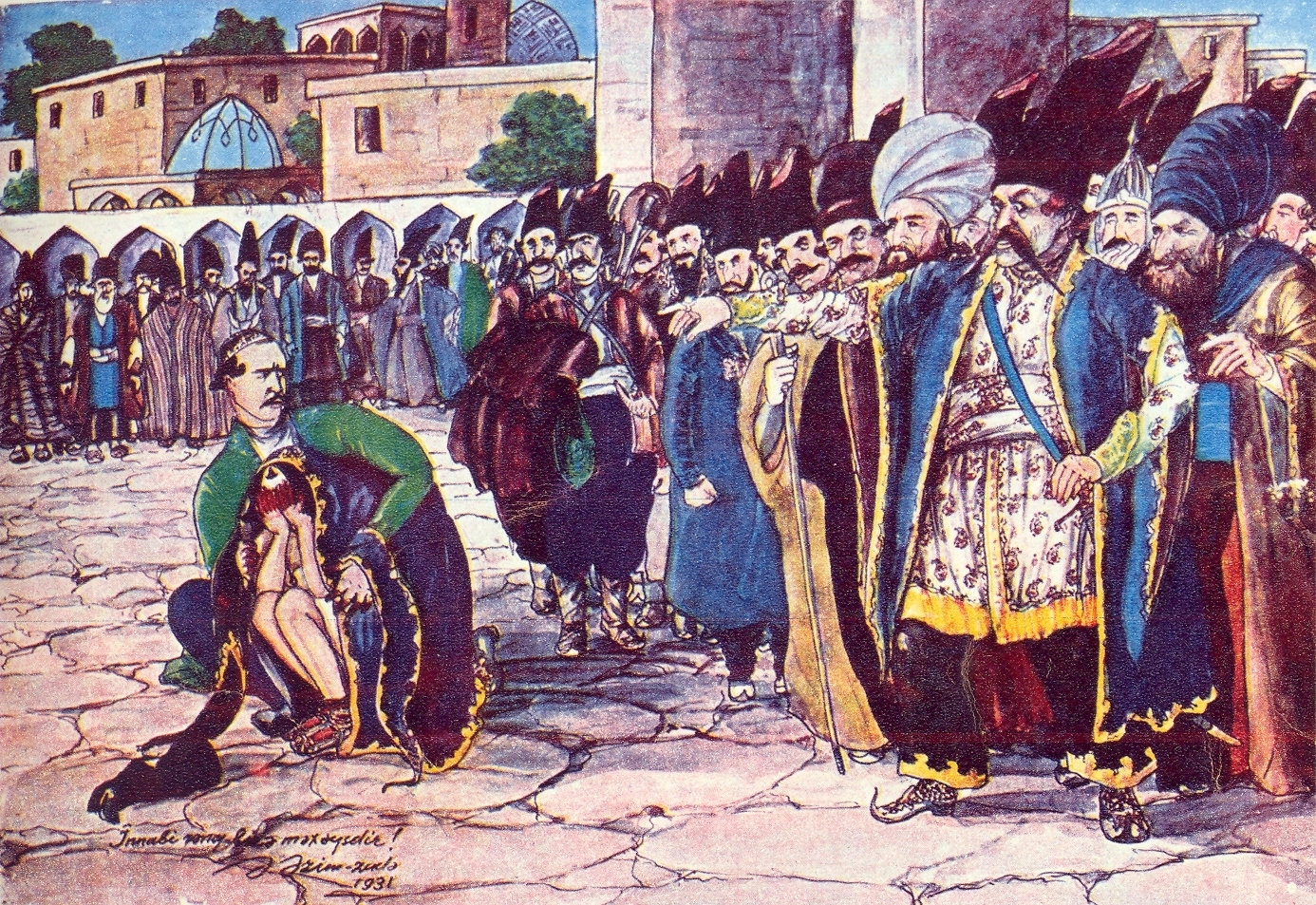
The color of claret belongs to us. 1931

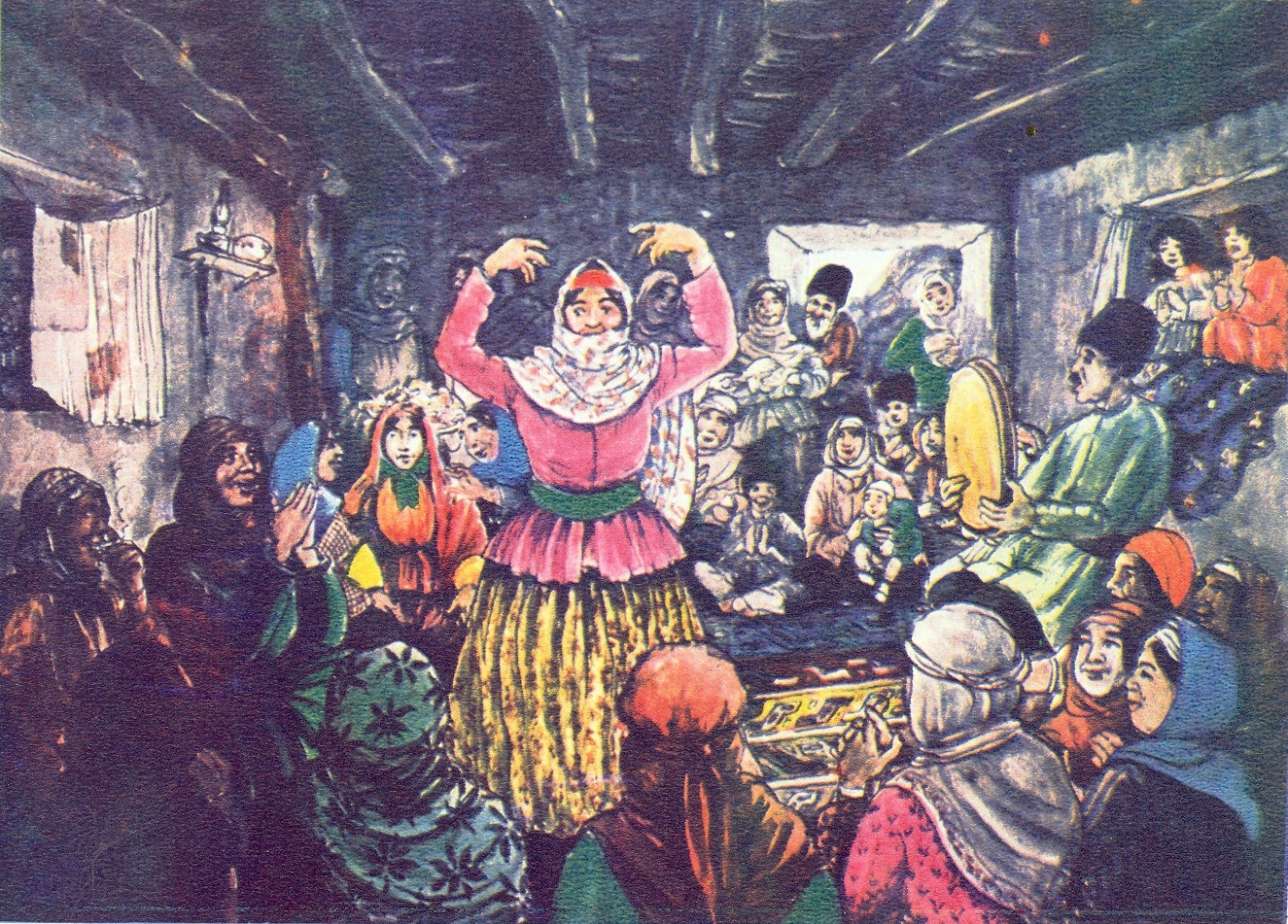
Wedding of the poor people. 1931

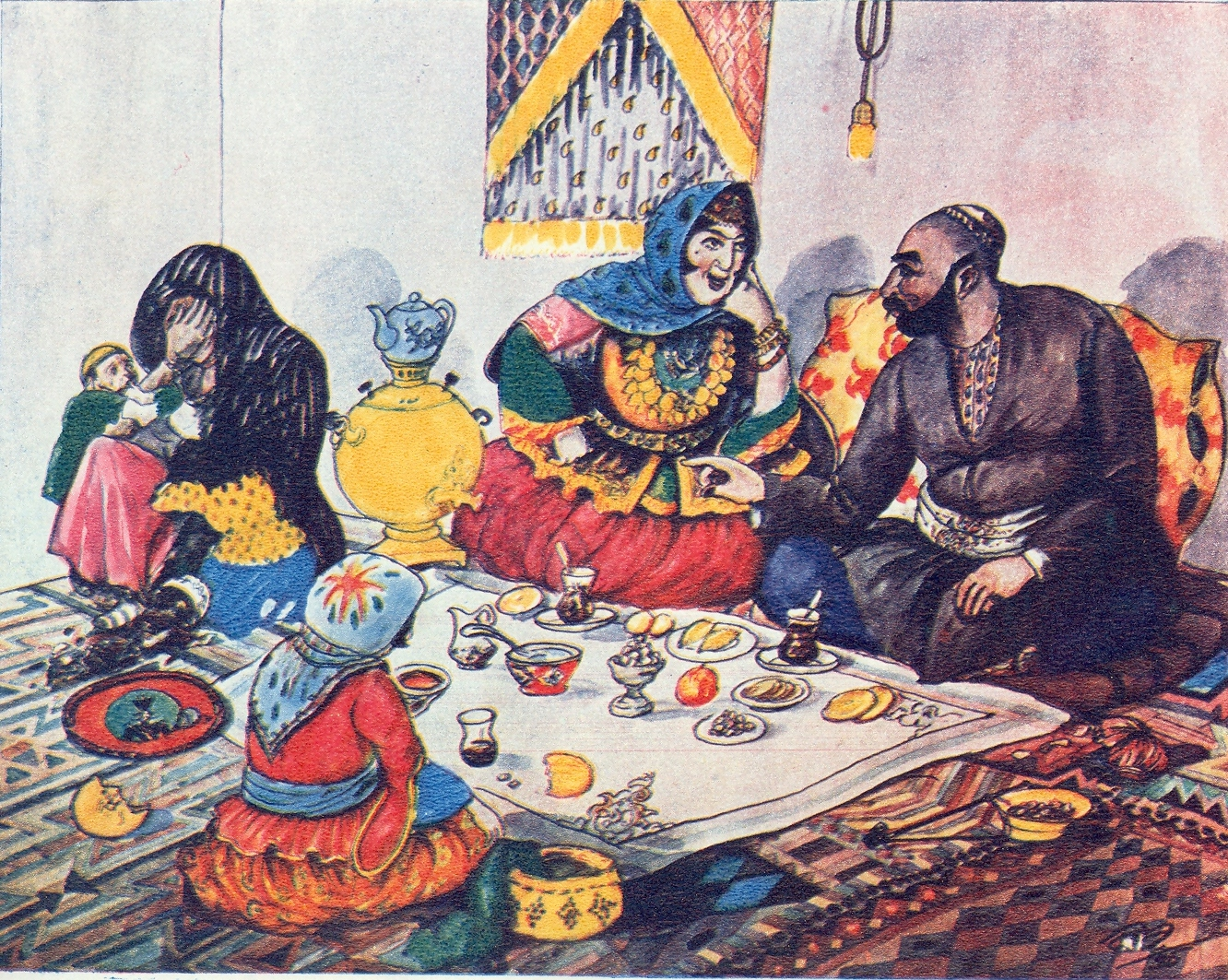
Old wife and a new one. 1935

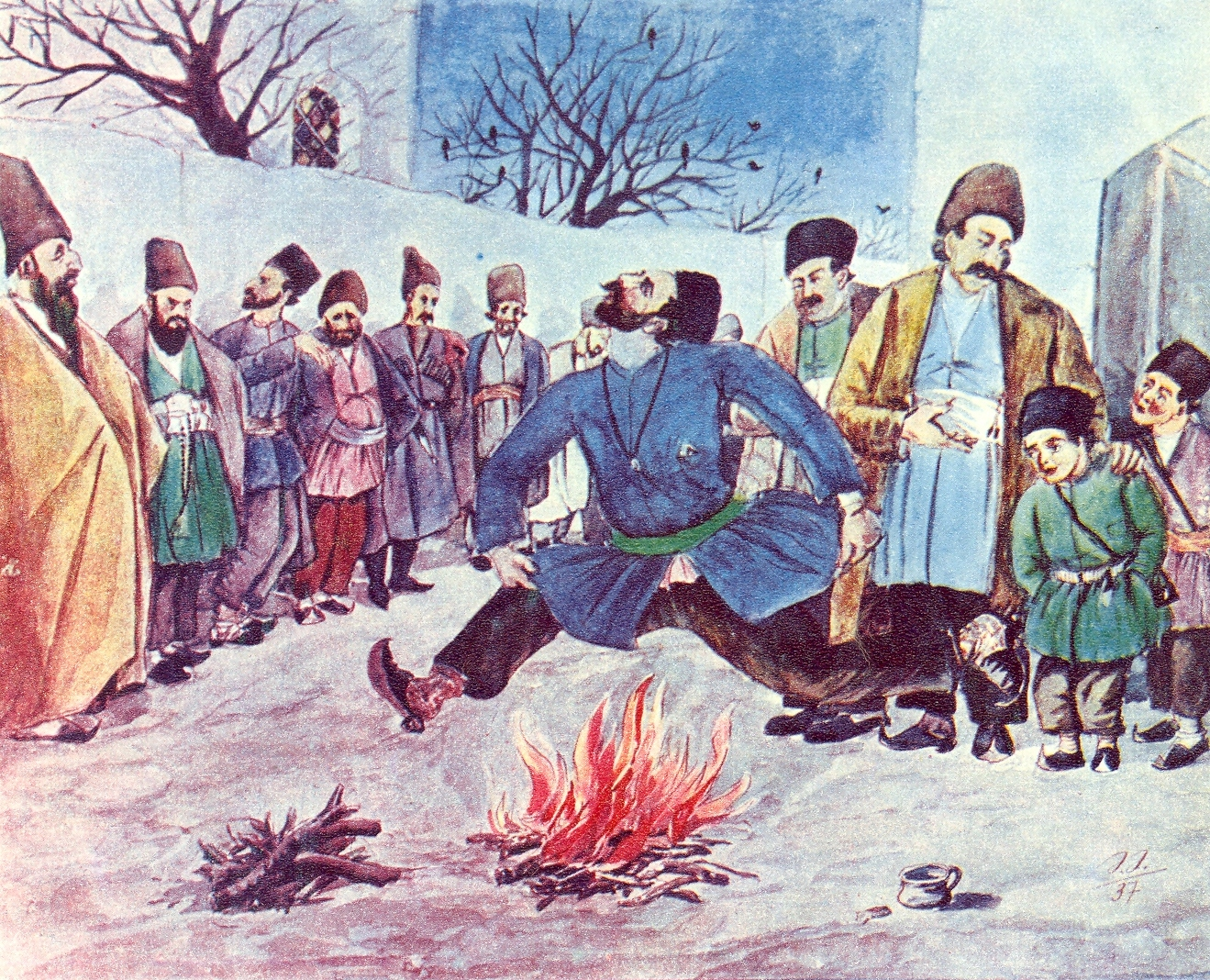
Jumping over bonfire. 1937

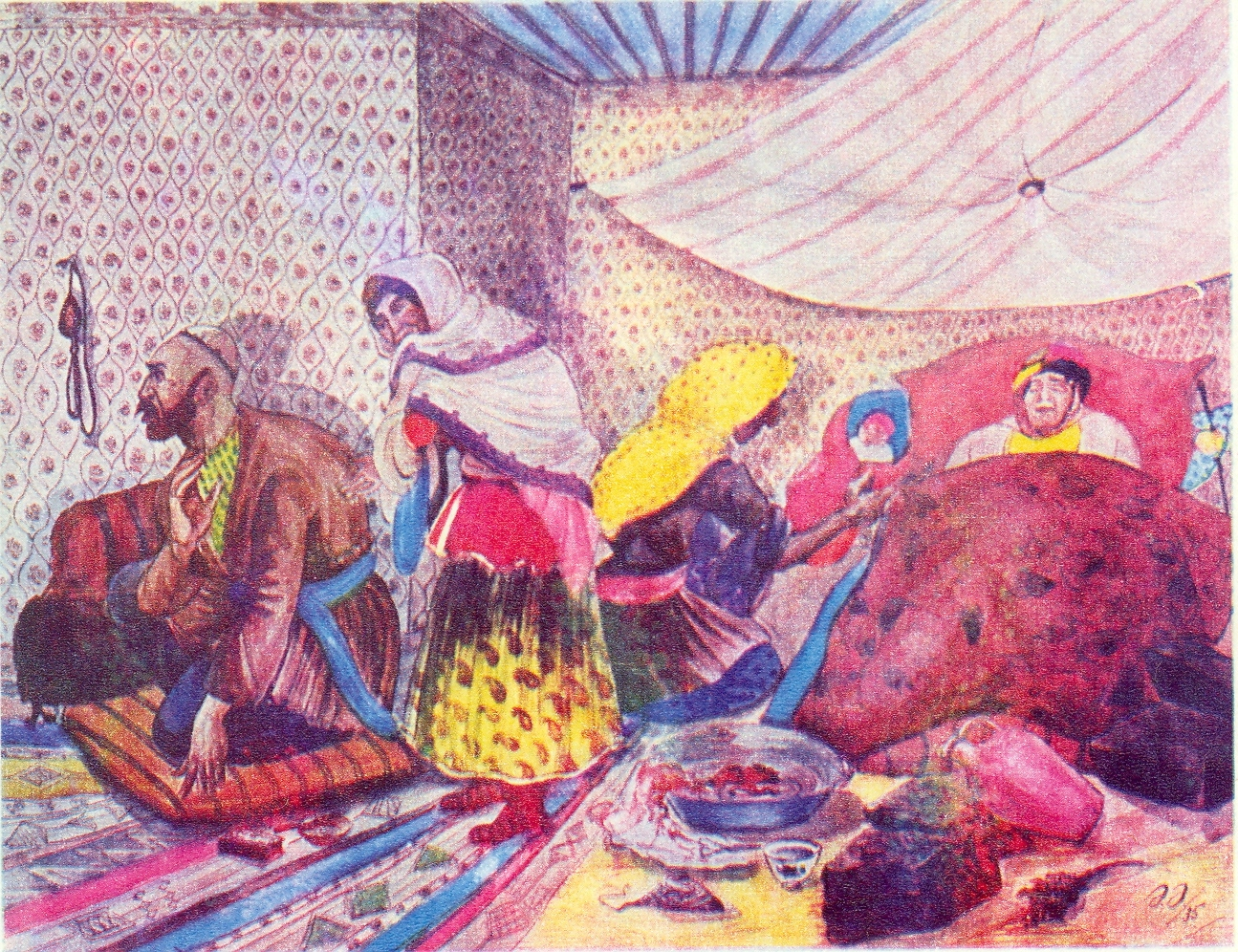
The girl was born. 1937

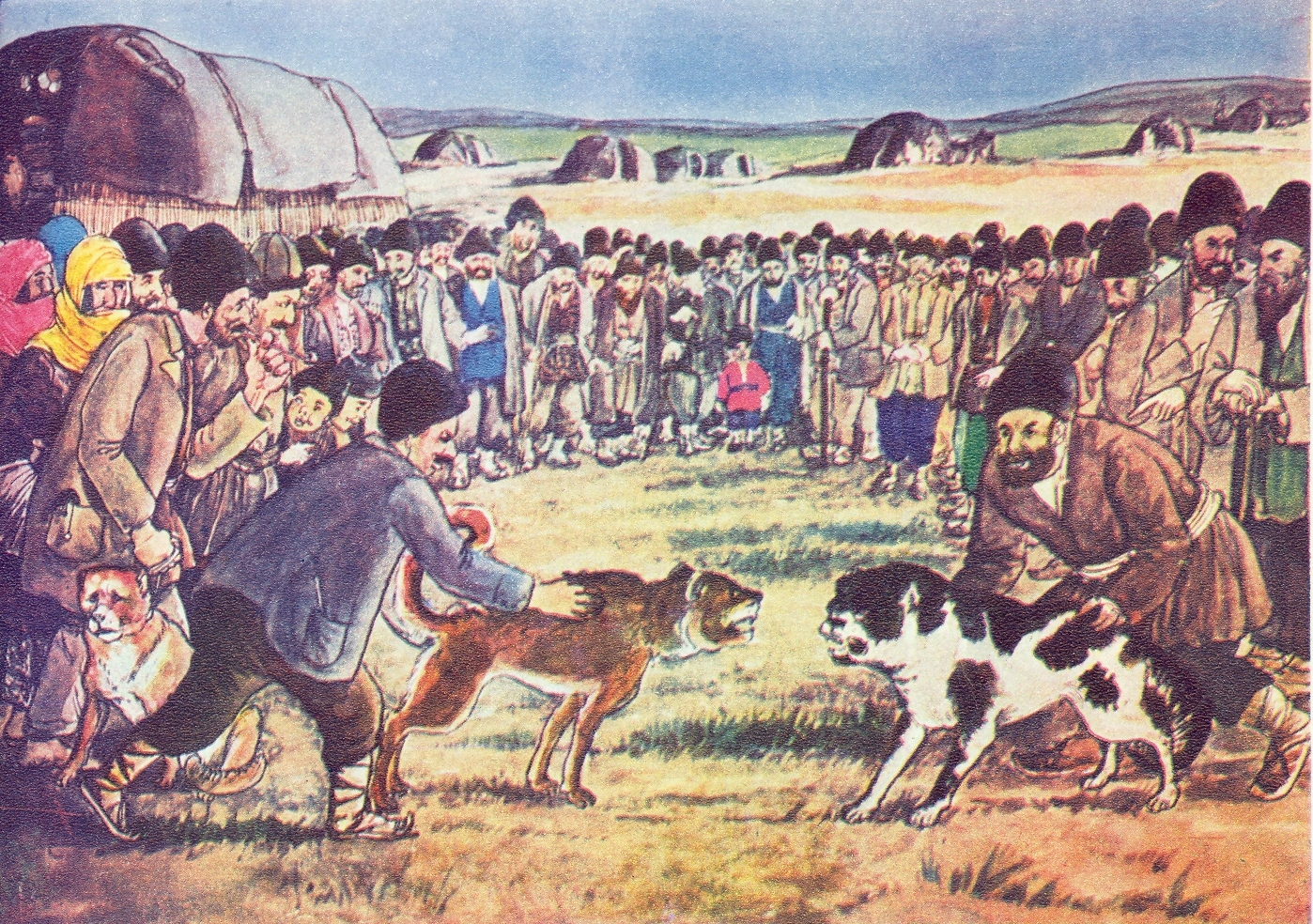
Dog baiting. 1938

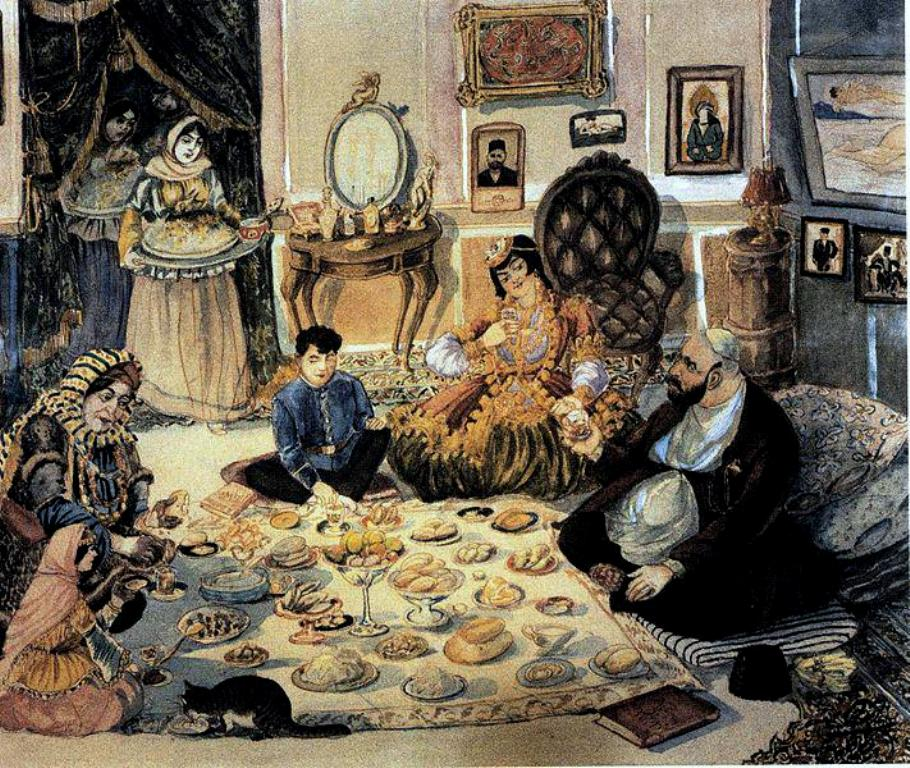
Ramadan of the rich people. 1932

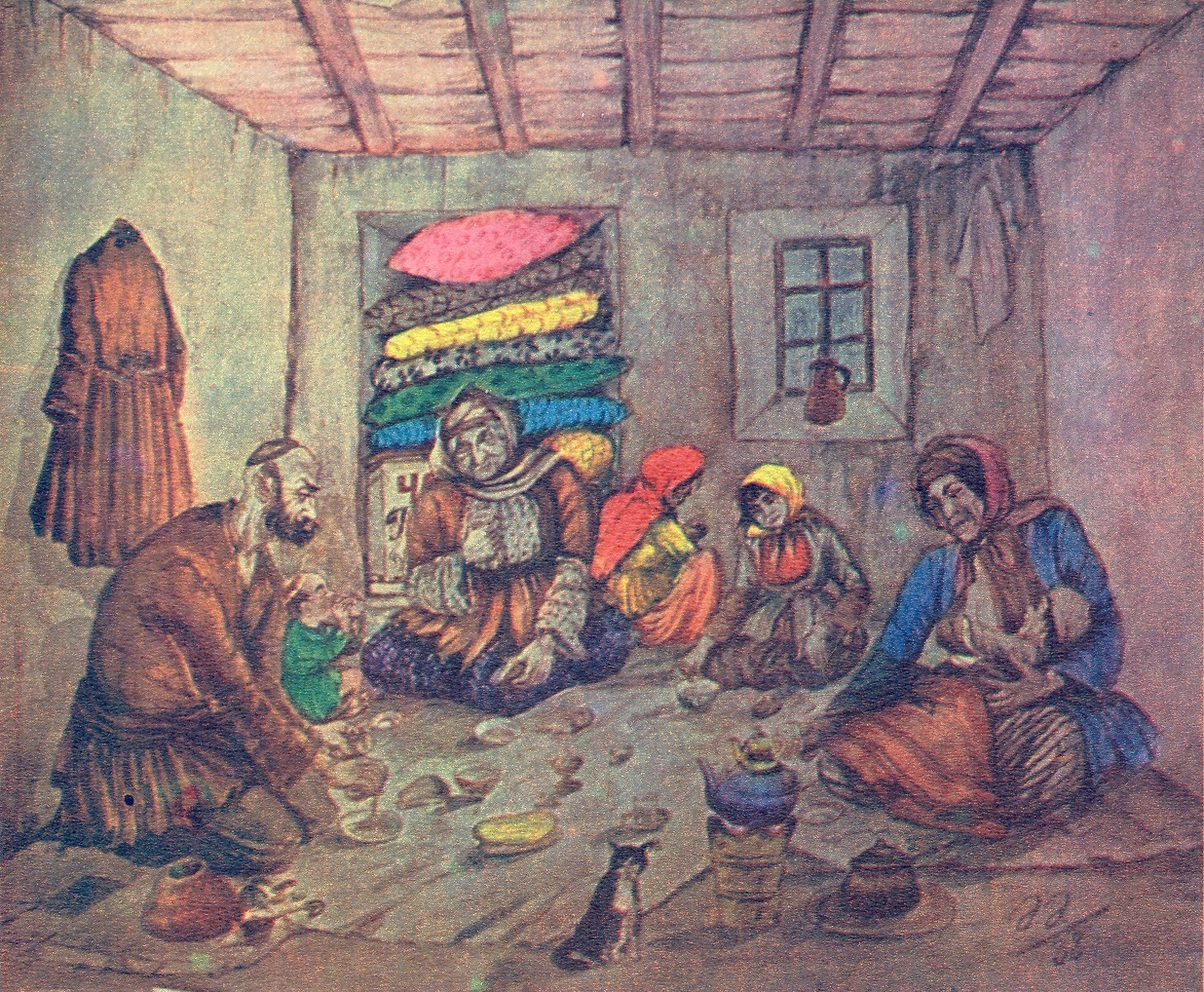
Ramadan of the poor people. 1938

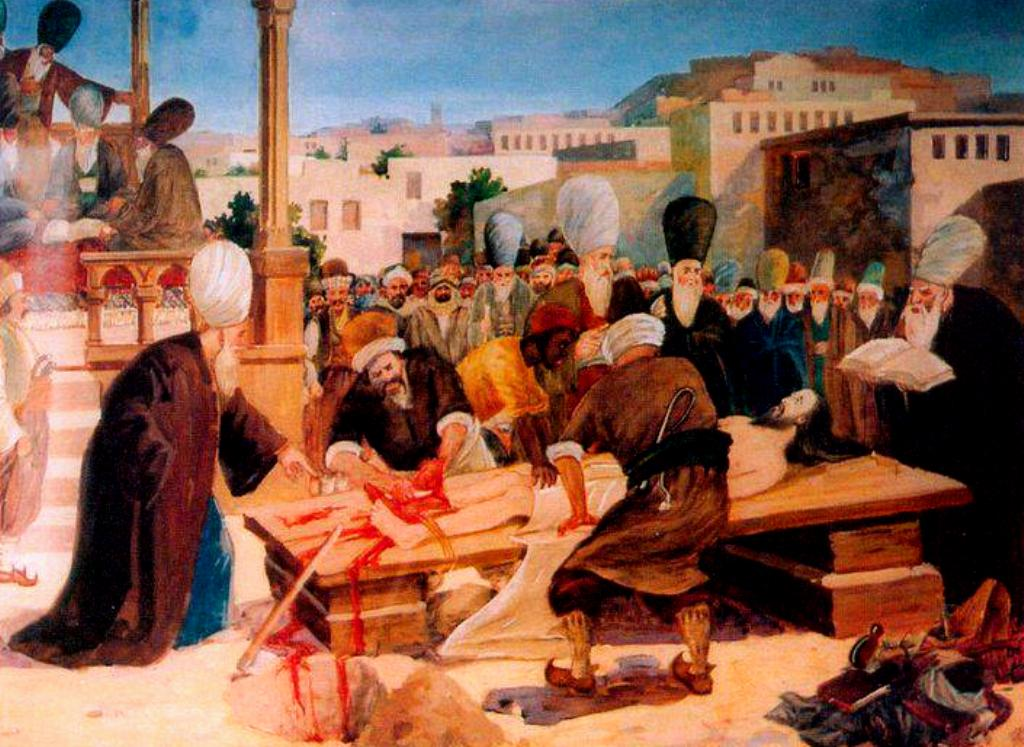
Execution of poet Nasimi
