= Salam Salamzade =

Azerbaijani painter

- Salam Salamzadə
- Born: Salam Abdulgasim oghlu Salamzade; 7 March 1908; Baku, Baku Governorate, Russian Empire
- Died: 12 May 1997 (aged 89); Baku, Azerbaijan
- Resting place: Alley of Honor
- Education: Azerbaijan State Art College; Moscow State Pedagogical University
- Known for: painter
- Spouse: Gamar Salamzade
- Awards: People's Artist of the Azerbaijan SSR Honored Art Worker of the Azerbaijan SSR Order of the Badge of Honour

Salam Abdulgasim oghlu Salamzade (Azerbaijani: Salam Əbdülqasım oğlu Salamzadə, 7 March 1908 — 12 May 1997) was a painter, Honored Art Worker of the Azerbaijan SSR (1940), and People's Artist of the Azerbaijan SSR (1982). Salam Salamzade's individual exhibitions were held in Baku (1959), (1962), (1974), Moscow (1969), (1974), and Kiev (1974), featuring his works. His works are also preserved in the museums, galleries, and private collections of foreign countries, alongside Azerbaijan. The painter was also involved in public activities and worked as the director of the Azerbaijan National Art Museum and the National museum of Azerbaijan literature named after Nizami Ganjavi. Currently, 72 of Salam Salamzade's works are stored and preserved in the fund of the Azerbaijan State Art Gallery.

== Biography ==
In 1931–1932, Salam Salamzade pursued pedagogical education at Moscow State Pedagogical University, along with actor and film director Rza Tahmasib, painter Rustam Mustafayev, and his future spouse, Gamar Najafzade. Even as a student, he worked as a literary editor and created illustrations for "Sharg qadini" ( The woman of east) and "Inqilab və mədəniyyət" ( Revalution and Culture) journals. After completing his university education, Salam Salamzade married Gamar Najafzade, the daughter of the national poet Aligulu Gamgusar and Azerbaijan's first female film director. The couple had two daughters.

== Creativity ==
In 1929, Salam Salamzade traveled to various regions of Azerbaijan and spent some time in Ganja and Lenkaran, where he engaged in creative work. During that period, he created thematic paintings such as "Sap sexi" (Theard factory) (1930), "MTS-in açılışı" (opening of MTS) (1932), "Gəncə toxuculuq fabrikində" (Ganja textile factory) "Komsomolçular iş vaxtı" (working hours of komsomol members) (1930), and "Konserv fabrikində" ( in a canning factory) which were characteristic of his early creative work.

During the years of the Second World War, the artist focused on creating portraits of war heroes. Additionally, in 1940, Salam Salamzade, together with the painter Sadiq Sharifzade, prepared a monumental panel called "Azərbaycan ədəbiyyatşünaslarının panteonu" for the Nizami Ganjavi Museum of Azerbaijani Literature. After the war, to further expand his creative skills, Salamzade embarked on journeys to the southern regions of the country, especially to Astara and Lenkaran, to sketch local life.

Salam Salamzade's portraits of cultural figures and depictions of laborers at work are highly convincing, capturing the characteristic and psychological traits of the subjects. These works also contain rich artistic elements that reveal the inner worlds of the subjects, along with lyrical literary details in industrial landscapes and natural settings. The artist's post-war portrait gallery was noted for its diversity. Among these portraits, there was one of his life partner, the first Azerbaijani female film director, Gamar Salamzade.

Salam Salamzade created a significant number of portrait artworks, including "Mania Karimova&'s Portrait" (1938), "Uzeyir Hajibeyov's Portrait" (1941), "People's Artist Sidgi Ruhulla's Portrait" (1944), "Behind the Scenes" (1955), "Portrait of Azerbaijan's first female film director Kamara Almaszade"(1957), "Portrait of Gilan and the Girl"(1957), "Portrait of Nariman Narimanov" (1958), "With the Girl Holding a Doll" (1962), "Portrait of a Young Collective Farm Girl" (1964), "Village Girl" (1972), and others.

In his genre and landscape paintings, Salam Salamzade occasionally combined the characteristics of both genres in a single artwork, employing a synthesis approach. Notable examples of his works in these genres include "Rustam's Battle with Afrasiab"(1934), "Under the Sun" (1958), "Sovkhoz Deserts" (1959), "Women Going to the Water" (1968), "Tea Plantation"(1970), "Comrades" (1970), "Dusk" (1973), "Wedding Guests"(1974), "Astara Subtropical Sovkhoz" (1976), "Reservoirs" (1976), "Lenkaran Tea Pickers" (1977), and others.

Starting from the 1960s, Salamzade made several trips to various foreign countries, creating artworks in the landscape and portrait genres based on his personal impressions. These paintings, produced as a result of his creative missions and travels to foreign countries, constitute a distinct direction in his art. One of his first foreign trips was to Czechoslovakia in 1958. Salamzade traveled extensively, acquainting himself with the history, rich cultural heritage, and contemporary life of the countries he visited, and created a series of artworks based on his experiences.

However, a separate line of his artistic activity formed after his visits to Arab countries. He spent an extended period in these Arab countries, residing for nearly half a year in countries such as Egypt, Iraq, Syria, Lebanon, and others. He observed the local situations and events, processed them through his artistic imagination, and created strikingly colorful artworks. Over the span of about a decade, he produced various genre artworks known as the "Arab Countries Series" (1961–1970). This series includes works like "Aswan High Dam", "Cairo Series"and others.

Art critic and corresponding member of the Azerbaijan National Academy of Sciences (AMEA), Kerim Kerimov, commented on this:

In the Arab countries, there have been many painters, but no one had the opportunity to become as closely acquainted with the life of the Arabs, conduct extensive observations, grasp the essence of events, and gather as much material for future works as S. Salamzade.

During the 1970s and 1980s, Salam Salamzade's artistic activity intensified, marking a mature period in his career.

== Exhibitions ==
Salam Salamzade began participating in exhibitions in the 1930s. His artworks were displayed in exhibitions held in several countries around the world. Additionally, his significant exhibitions included the "All-Union Fine Arts Exhibitions" held in Moscow in 1949 and 1951.

Salam Salamzade organized individual exhibitions featuring his works in Baku (1959), (1962), (1974), Moscow (1969), (1974), and Kiev (1974).

In 1987, Salamzade held an individual exhibition featuring his work "Liviyada"

His works are preserved in the Rustam Mustafayev Azerbaijan National Art Museum, the Azerbaijan State Art Gallery, and other museums.

Salamzade's artworks have been exhibited in various countries, including Poland, Germany, Romania, Hungary, France, Spain, Austria, Italy, Lebanon, Syria, Egypt, Tunisia, Venezuela, Turkey, Iran, and Iraq.

== Awards ==
- Honored Art Worker of the Azerbaijan SSR
- People's Artist of the Azerbaijan SSR — 1 December 1982
- Order of the Badge of Honour — 9 June 1959
- Order of Friendship of Peoples — 5 March 1988
