= House-Museum of Azim Azimzade =

- Azerbaijani: Əzim Əzimzadənin ev-muzeyi
- Established: 1968; 58 years ago
- Location: Dilara Aliyeva Street, Baku, Azerbaijan
- Coordinates: 40°22′30″N 49°50′09″E
- Director: Irada Azimzade
- Website: ezimzade.ev-muzeyi.az

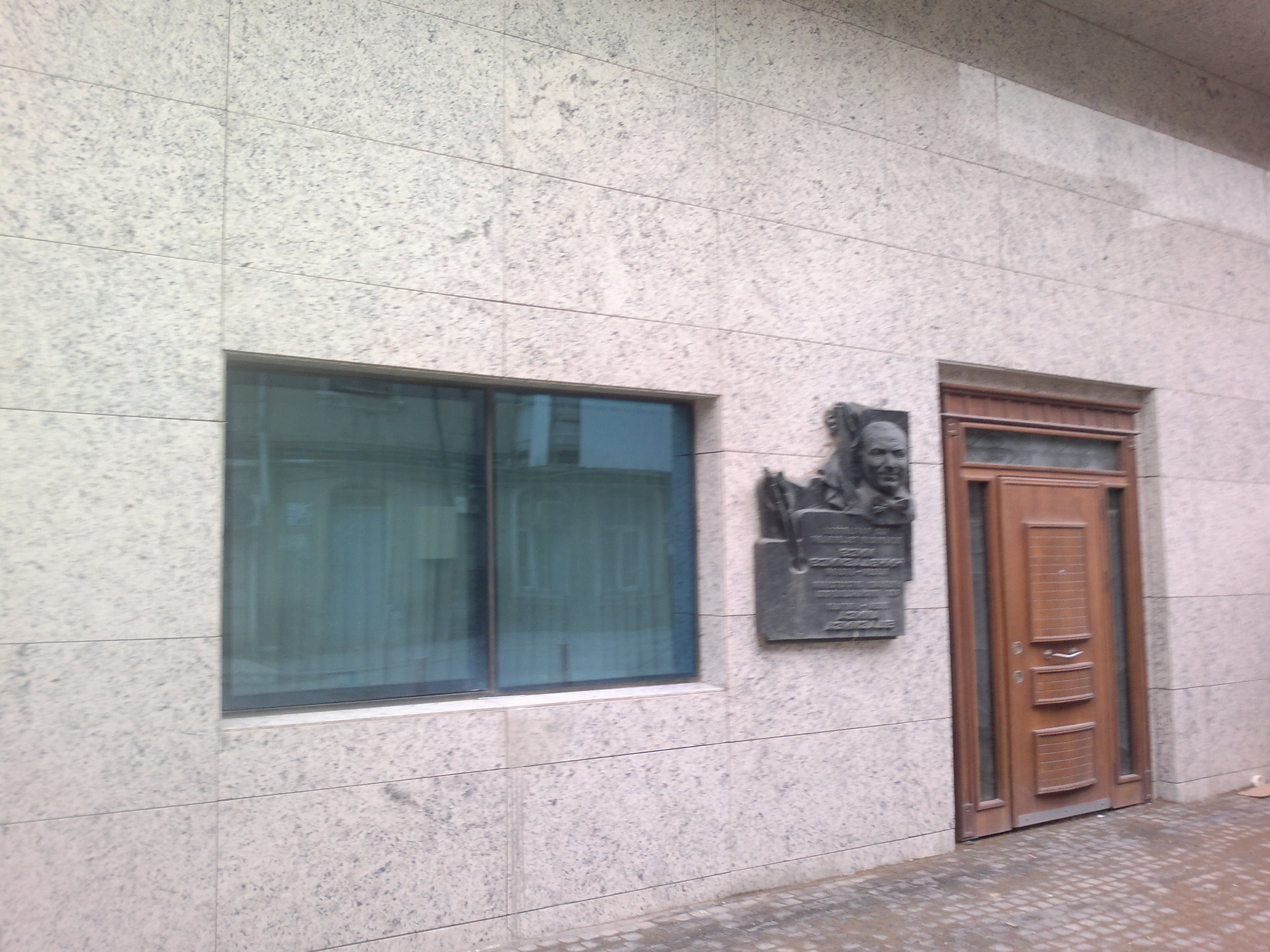
House-museum of Azim Azimzade

The house-museum of Azim Azimzade (Azerbaijani: Əzim Əzimzadənin ev-muzeyi) is a memorial museum dedicated to the Azerbaijani artist and caricaturist, people's artist of the Azerbaijan SSR. It is located in Baku, the capital of Azerbaijan. The personal belongings of Azim Azimzade, including documents, photographs, and artistic works are exhibited in the museum.

== History ==
The museum was inaugurated in 1968 in a small apartment where the artist lived most of his life, however, the aging structure was ultimately unsuitable for this purpose. In this regard, the Ministry of Culture of Azerbaijan ordered the construction of the museum.

== Exposition ==
More than 2000 exhibits related to the artist's work are preserved in the museum. The exposition of the house-museum of A. Azimzade consists of 6 rooms, which showcased 4 types of the artist's works:

- Cartoons
- Portraits
- Ornaments
- Landscapes
