= Rustam Mustafayev =

Azerbaijani scenic designer and painter

- Azerbaijani: Rüstəm Mustafayev
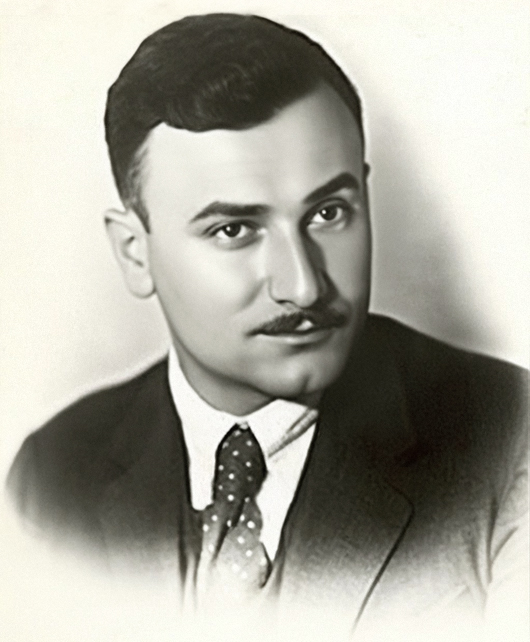
- Born: 25 February 1910; Baku, Russian Empire
- Died: 19 July 1940 (aged 30); Baku, Soviet Union
- Resting place: Alley of Honor
- Education: Azerbaijan State Art School
- Known for: painter
- Style: scenography

Rustam Mammad oghlu Mustafayev (Azerbaijani: Rüstəm Məmməd oğlu Mustafayev, 25 February 1910 – 19 July 1940) was a painter, one of the creators of realist scenography in Azerbaijan.

== Biography ==
Rustam Mustafayev was born on 25 February 1910 in Baku. In 1921–1926 he studied at Azerbaijan State Art School. After an internship in Moscow in 1928, he returned to Baku and worked for a time as a stage-painter at Baku Free Criticism and Propaganda Theater. He also worked at Azerbaijan Opera and Ballet Theater and Azerbaijan State Drama Theater. From 1937 to 1940, he served as director of the Central State Office for the Protection of Azerbaijani Monuments.

He died on 19 July 1940 in Baku and is buried in the Alley of Honor. The Azerbaijan State Museum of Art was named after Rustam Mustafayev in 1943.

== Career ==
R. Mustafayev worked as a chief artist at Azerbaijan State Drama Theater in 1933–1938. He designed works by Jalil Mammadguluzadeh, Jafar Jabbarly, Huseyn Javid, Abdurrahim bey Hagverdiyev, operas "Shah Ismayil" (Muslim Magomayev), "Leyli and Majnun" (Uzeyir Hajibeyov), "Koroghlu" (Uzeyir Hajibeyov), "Ashig Garib" (Zulfugar Hajibeyov), ballet "Swan Lake" (Pyotr Ilyich Tchaikovsky).

He also worked on artistic design of posters and books. The artistic design of the books of Samad Vurgun, Suleyman Rustam, Rasul Rza and other poets was his first graphic works. The artistic design of the book "Voice of Ashiq", consisting of poems of Azerbaijani ashiqs, published in 1939, also belongs to Rustam Mustafayev. In 1940, he was one of the authors of the artistic design of Nizami Museum.

== Awards ==
- Order of the Badge of Honour

== Gallery ==
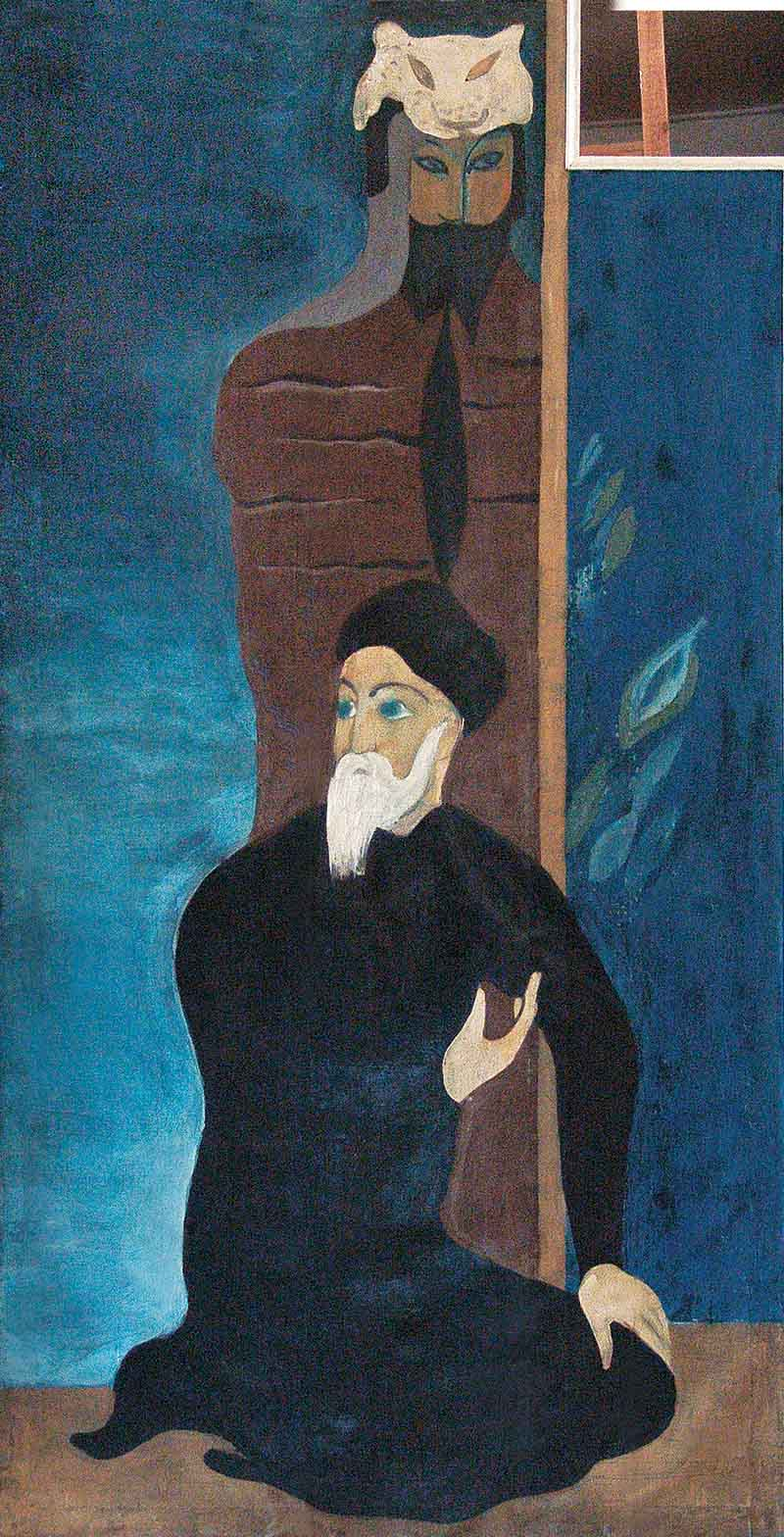
Rustam Mustafayev – Portrait of Ferdowsi . 1934. National Art Museum of Azerbaijan

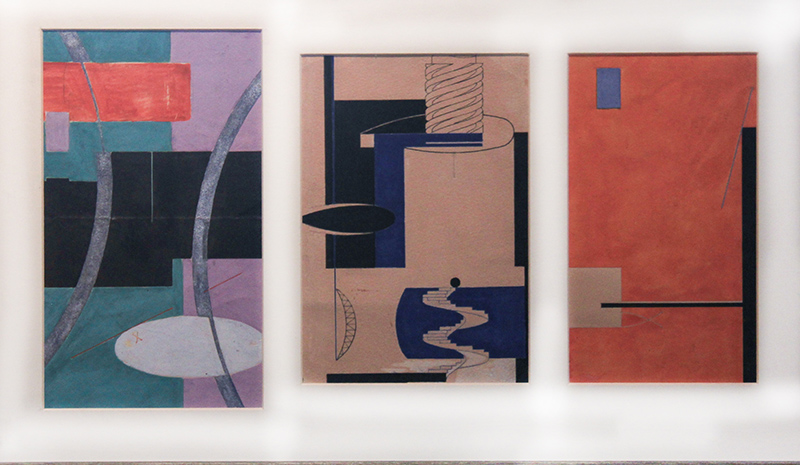
Rustam Mustafayev – Artistic design. 1930s. National Art Museum of Azerbaijan

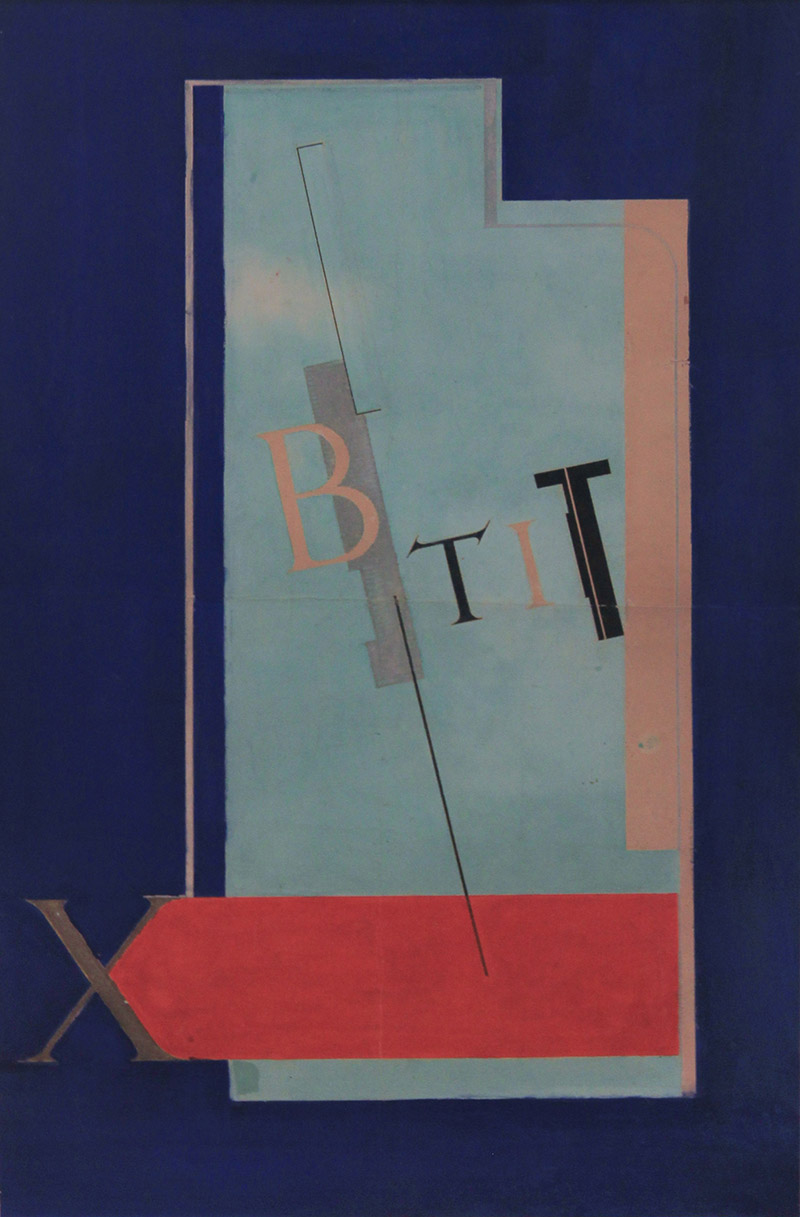
Rustam Mustafayev – Theater poster. 1930. National Art Museum of Azerbaijan
