= Taze hayat =

Azerbaijani daily political, economic and literary newspaper

Tazə həyat (Taze hayat)
- Type: Daily
- Owner: Hashim bey Vazirov
- Founder: Hashim bey Vazirov
- Publisher: Hashim bey Vazirov
- Editor-in-chief: Hashim bey Vazirov
- Staff writers: Mirza Ali-akbar Sabir, Mahammad Hadi, Mahammad Said Ordubadi, Mashadi Azar, Haji Ibrahim Gasimov, Akhund Yusif Ziya Talibzadeh
- Founded: 1 April 1907; 118 years ago
- Ceased publication: December 1908
- Language: Azerbaijani
- Headquarters: Baku, Russian Empire

Taze hayat (Azerbaijani: Tazə həyat) was a socio-political and literary newspaper published in Baku between 1907 and 1908. Its publisher and editor-in-chief was Hashim bey Vazirov. The newspaper played a significant role in the formation of the Azerbaijani national press.

== Establishment ==
The Taze hayat newspaper commenced publication in April 1907 in the city of Baku. Its founder and editor-in-chief, Hashim bey Vazirov, sought the support of Haji Zeynalabdin Taghiyev in establishing an independent press outlet and subsequently obtained official permission from the Baku Municipal Administration. The first issue of the newspaper was published on 1 April 1907. This period coincided with a complex and challenging era in the socio-political life of both Azerbaijani and broader Russian Empire Muslims.

== Ideological orientation ==
The newspaper’s editorial vision was grounded in the principles of liberty, equality, and justice, alongside Islamic values. In the main editorial article titled "Our Aim", Taze hayat stated its commitment to guiding Muslims toward socio-economic and cultural development in line with the demands of the modern era, and to fostering the modernization of their living conditions.

Hashim bey Vazirov placed strong emphasis on Muslim solidarity and addressed the shared challenges faced by the global Muslim community from a universalist perspective. In addition, the newspaper advocated nationalist ideas and emphasized equal recognition of all social strata — from wealthy elites to laborers — as integral parts of the nation.

Politically, Taze hayat adopted a progressive stance, promoting the extension of the rights and privileges enjoyed by ethnic Russians within the Russian Empire to its Muslim populations. In terms of language policy, the newspaper aimed to reach a broad readership by employing clear and accessible language while deliberately avoiding elitist jargon and obscure terminology.

== Editorial board ==
Taze hayat brought together some of the most prominent literary and journalistic figures of its time. The paper benefited from the contributions of renowned writers and public intellectuals such as Mirza Alakbar Sabir, Muhammad Hadi, Mammed Said Ordubadi, Mashadi Azar, Haji Ibrahim Gasimov, and Akhund Yusif Ziya Talibzade. Their intellectual output and ideological perspectives played a key role in shaping the newspaper’s editorial direction.

== Publication activity and closure ==
Between April and December 1907, Taze hayat published 209 issues, and in 1908, a further 230 issues — making a total of 439 issues during its lifespan. However, toward the end of 1908, censorship measures imposed by the Russian imperial authorities intensified, leading to the suspension of the newspaper’s publication. Prior to this, in September 1906, the Baku governor-general had already imposed restrictions on the newspaper’s activity, claiming it was promoting a "harmful direction."

== Sources ==
- Aşırlı, Akif (2009). Azərbaycan Mətbuatı Tarixi (1875-1920) (in Azerbaijani). Bakı: Elm və Təhsil Nəşriyyatı.
- Şahverdiyev, A.B (2006). Azərbaycan mətbuatı tarixi (PDF) (in Azerbaijani). Bakı: "Təhsil" nəşriyyatı.
- Koç, Elif (2018-06-04). "Çarlık Dönemi Azerbaycan Matbuatı Üzerine Bir İnceleme". Atatürk Üniversitesi Edebiyat Fakültesi Dergisi (in Turkish) (60): 181–196.
