= Şırlan =

- Location within Azerbaijan Location within Karabakh Economic Region
- Coordinates: 39°47′07″N 46°36′43″E
- Country: Azerbaijan
- District: Shusha
- Time zone: UTC+4 (AZT)

Şırlan (Shyrlan) is a village in the Shusha District of Azerbaijan.
