= People's Artist of the Azerbaijan SSR =

Soviet Azerbaijan honorary title (1928–1990)

People's Artist of the Azerbaijan SSR Azərbaycan SSR xalq rəssamı
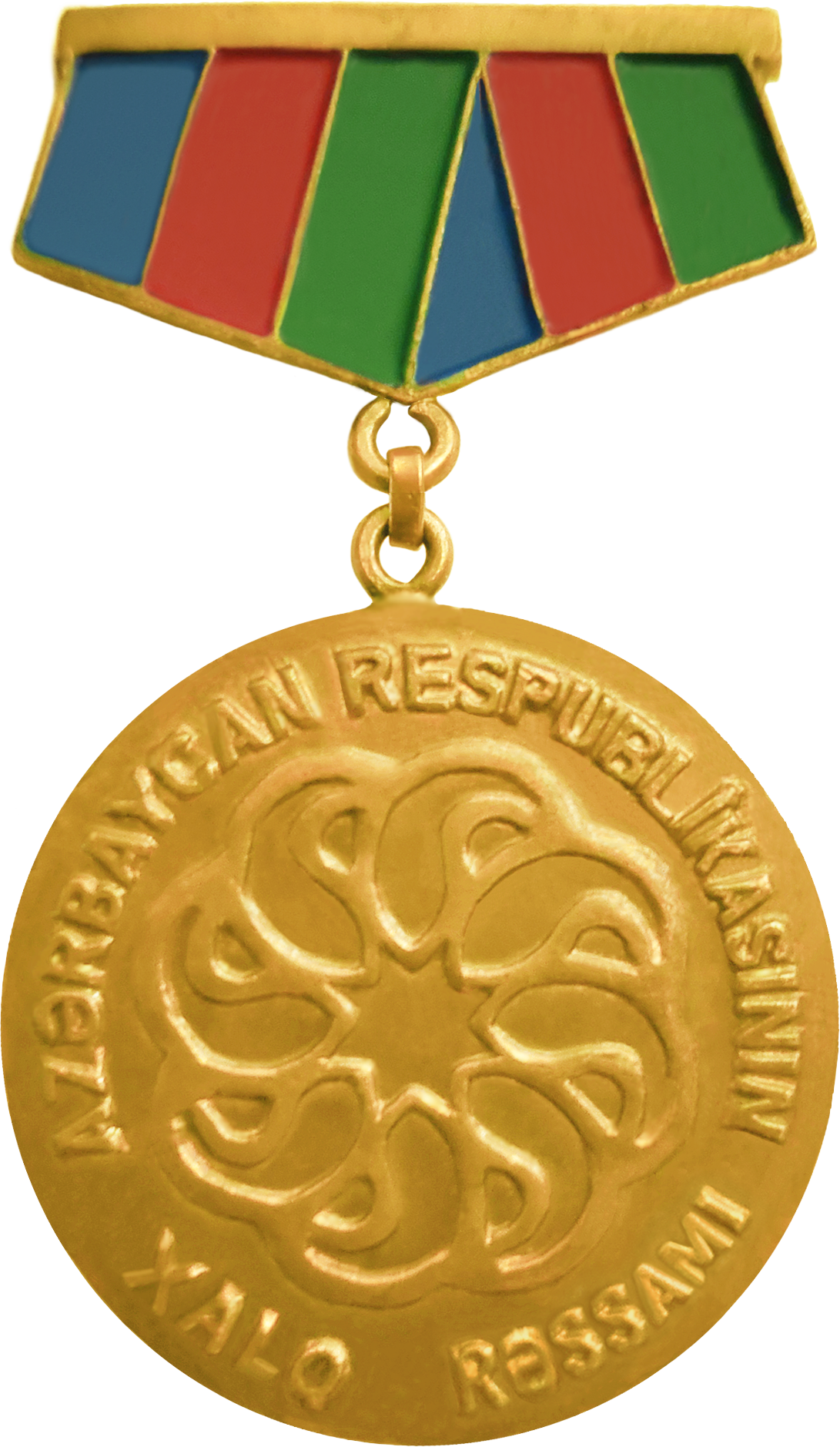
- Awarded for: Visual art, painting
- Date: 2 August 1944 – 5 February 1991
- Formerly called: People's Artist of the Azerbaijan Soviet Socialist Republic

The People's Artist of the Azerbaijan SSR (Azerbaijani: Azərbaycan SSR xalq rəssamı, lit. 'People's Artists of the Azerbaijan SSR') was an honorary title awarded from 1944 to 1990, it was granted to artists of the Azerbaijan SSR for contribution to the development of Azerbaijani culture in the fields of visual art and painting. It was modeled after the People's Artist of the USSR.

This award was succeeded by the People's Artist of Azerbaijan title in 1990.

== History ==
The People's Artist of the Azerbaijan SSR was established on 2 August 1944. This honorary title award was succeeded by the People's Artist of Azerbaijan title in 1990.

== List of People's Artists of the Azerbaijan SSR ==
- Mikayil Abdullayev (1963)
- Ismayil Akhundov
- Sattar Bahlulzade (1963)
- Asaf Jafarov
- Latif Karimov (1960)
- Kazim Kazimzade
- Maral Rahmanzade (1964)
- Tahir Salahov
- Salam Salamzade

== See also ==
- People's Artist of the USSR
- List of Azerbaijani artists
- List of Azerbaijani women artists
