= Aydin Kazimzade =

Azerbaijani artist (born 1940)

Aydin Kazimzade Aydın Kazımzadə
- Born: January 15, 1940 (age 86); Baku, Azerbaijan SSR, USSR
- Education: Azerbaijan State University
- Occupations: cinematographer, screenwriter

Aydin Alakbar oghlu Kazimzade (Azerbaijani: Aydın Ələsgər oğlu Kazımzadə, born January 15, 1940) is an Azerbaijani cinematographer, Honored Cultural Worker of Azerbaijan (2000) and Honored Art Worker (2005), Presidential Scholar (2012).

== Biography ==
Aydin Kazimov was born on January 15, 1940, in Baku. In 1958–1963, he studied at the journalism faculty of Azerbaijan State University. Since 1963, he worked in the field of cinematography. In 1985, he graduated from the advanced training courses for creative and leading cinematographers in advertising at Gerasimov Institute of Cinematography.

He founded film press in Azerbaijan, worked as an editor-in-chief of "Kino" newspaper and "Film" magazine, the director of the Information and Advertising Bureau of the State Cinematography Committee of the Azerbaijan SSR, the head of the dubbing department at AzTV, the head of the advertising department at "Azerkinovideo" PU, the deputy editor-in-chief, executive director of the Azerbaijan Cinema Encyclopedia, the deputy director and chief specialist of the State Film Fund.

In 1974, the "Kino" newspaper won the All-Union competition of press organizations published in the field of cinematography and was awarded with a diploma of the USSR Cinematography Committee. Until now, more than 200 scientific and journalistic articles related to cinema have been published in periodicals. He was the host of the "From our movie history" and "Kinoman" programs on local television channels. He was the host and screenwriter of the "Kinosalnamə" program on the Medeniyyet TV.

From 1997 until now, he teaches the history of Azerbaijani cinema at the Azerbaijan State University of Culture and Arts and is an associate professor of the named university. Currently, he works as a leading specialist of the cinema museum under the Azerbaijan State Film Fund. Until 2012, he worked as a senior specialist in film archives at the Film Fund.

The fact that the history of Azerbaijan national cinema began not in 1916, but in 1898 was revealed and proved, and the declaration of August 2 as the Day of Cinema Workers by the order of the former president Heydar Aliyev is connected with the name of Aydin Kazimzade. And the fact that the history of animation cinema in Azerbaijan dates back to 1933 was also revealed and proved precisely because of Aydin Kazimzade.

== Awards ==
He was awarded "Golden pen" in 2000, Humay Award in 2001, "Golden lamp" in 2003, "In the name of Rasul Rza" in 2007, "Hasan bey Zardabi" in 2008, "Yusif Mammadaliyev" and "Jafar Jabbarly" in 2010, and "Zirva" in 2011.

In 2000, he received the title of Honored Cultural Worker of Azerbaijan, and in 2005, Honored Art Worker, and since 2012, he has been a Presidential Scholar.
