= Sirus Mirzazade =

Azerbaijani painter

Sirus Mirzazade Sirus Mirzəzadə
- Born: January 22, 1944 (age 81); Baku, Azerbaijan SSR, USSR
- Education: Surikov Art Institute
- Occupation: painter
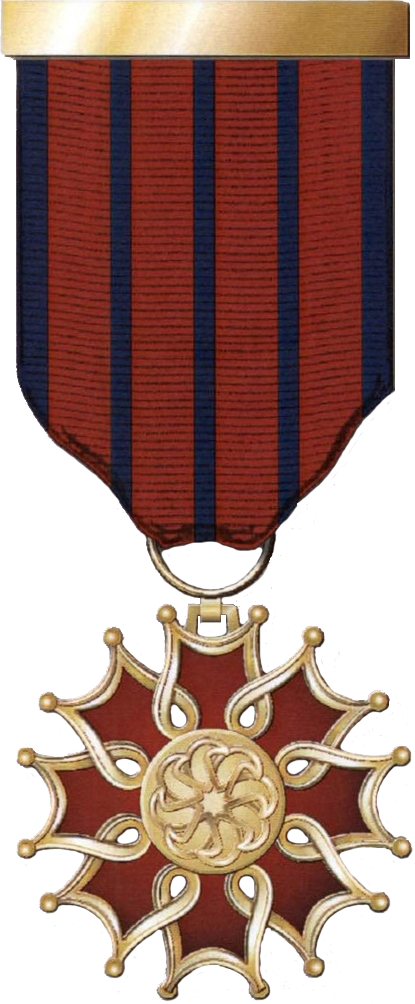
- Awards

Sirus Yadulla oghlu Mirzazade (Azerbaijani: Sirus Yədulla oğlu Mirzəzadə, born January 22, 1944) is an Azerbaijani painter, People's Artist of Azerbaijan (2018).

== Biography ==
Sirus Mirzazade was born on January 22, 1944, in Baku. He graduated from the Azim Azimzade Art School in 1966, and from the Surikov Art Institute in 1972. In 1972, he became a member of the Union of Artists of Azerbaijan.

Since 1972, he has been regularly participating in republican, all-Union and international exhibitions and has been awarded many prizes. His personal exhibitions were held in Baku and Moscow in 1987, in France and Turkey in 1995.

His works have been exhibited in Azerbaijan, Russia, Iran, Turkey, Germany, the Netherlands, Norway, France, Cuba, Romania, Bulgaria, Hungary, Syria, the United Arab Emirates, the United Kingdom, the United States, and Italy, and are kept in museums and private collections.

Currently, he works as a teacher at the Azerbaijan State Academy of Fine Arts.

== Awards ==
- People's Artist of Azerbaijan — May 27, 2018
- Honored Artist of Azerbaijan – May 30, 2002
- Humay Award — 1996
