= Adigozalov =

Adigozalov is a surname. Notable people with the surname include:

- Rauf Adigozalov (1940–2002), Azerbaijani violinist and singer
- Telman Adigozalov (1953–2010), Azerbaijani actor and television presenter
- Vasif Adigozalov (1935–2006), Azerbaijani composer
- Zulfu Adigozalov (1898–1963), Azerbaijani singer
