= List of Azerbaijani artists =

The following list of Azerbaijani artists (in alphabetical order by last name) includes artists of various genres, who are notable and are either born in Azerbaijan, of Azerbaijani descent or who produce works that are primarily about Azerbaijan.

== A ==
- Mikayil Abdullayev, painter
- Fuad Abdurahmanov, sculptor
- Sara Ashurbeyli, painter
- Azim Azimzade, painter

== B ==
- Sattar Bahlulzade, painter
- Semyon Bilmes, painter

== E ==
- Omar Eldarov, sculptor

== G ==
- Usta Gambar Garabaghi, painter
- Nadir Gasimov, painter
- Jalal Garyaghdi, sculptor and painter

== H ==
- Ahad Hosseini, painter
- Haydar Hatemi, painter

== I ==
- Mirza Gadim Iravani, painter

== J ==
- Asaf Jafarov, painter

== K ==
- Bahruz Kangarli, painter
- Latif Karimov, carpet designer
- Geysar Kashiyeva, painter
- Davud Kazimov, painter
- Farhad Khalilov, painter
- Kamil Khanlarov, painter

== M ==
- Aida Mahmudova, painter
- Tokay Mammadov, painter
- Shmavon Mangasarov, painter
- Rafig Mehdiyev, painter
- Gunay Mehdizade, painter
- Eldar Mikayilzade, carpet designer, graphic designer, visual artist
- Boyukagha Mirzazade, painter
- Rustam Mustafayev, scenic designer
- Gullu Mustafayeva, painter, portraitist

== N ==
- Togrul Narimanbekov, painter
- Vidadi Narimanbekov, painter

== R ==
- Maral Rahmanzade, painter
- Alakbar Rezaguliyev, painter
- Elbey Rzaguliyev, painter

== S ==
- Tahir Salahov, painter
- Fuad Salayev, sculptor

== T ==
- Taghi Taghiyev, painter

== See also ==
- List of Azerbaijani women artists
- List of Azerbaijani painters
- People's Artist of Azerbaijan
- People's Artist of the Azerbaijan SSR
