= Yalchin Adigezalov =

Azerbaijani conductor (born 1959)

- Born: November 4, 1959 (age 66); Baku, Azerbaijani SSR, Soviet Union
- Genres: Opera, symphonic music
- Occupations: Conductor, Professor
- Years active: (1989–present)
- Labels: Sony, Naxos, Olimpia

Yalchin Vasif oghlu Adigezalov (Azerbaijani: Yalçın Vasif oğlu Adıgözəlov; born November 4, 1959) is an Azerbaijani conductor and teacher. Adigezalov is a professor at the State Music Academy of Azerbaijan, the Baku Music Academy and Azerbaijan State Conservatory. He is a member of the third generation of a famous musical dynasty.

== Biography ==
Yalchin Adigezalov was born on November 4, 1959, in Baku in the family of the composer Vasif Adigozalov. He is a representative of the third generation of a famous musical dynasty.

=== Education ===
At the age of 8 he began to study piano at the Special Music School at the Conservatory (A. Kopelevich and B.Guslitser).

In 1982 he graduated from the piano faculty of the Azerbaijan State Conservatory named after Uzeyir Hajibeyov (Professor R. Atakishiyev).

In 1983–1984 he studied at the Faculty of Opera and Symphony Conducting at Tashkent State Conservatory (professor K. Usmanov).

In 1984–1989 he studied at the Faculty of Opera and Symphony Conducting at the Leningrad Conservatory (Professor Ilya Musin).

In 1990–1992 he was the first representative of Azerbaijan to study at the Vienna Academy of Music and Performing Arts (Wien – Musikhochschule, Professor Karl Esterreicher).

=== Career ===
From 1989 he was a conductor, in 1991–1998 he was Artistic director and chief conductor of the Azerbaijan State Symphony Orchestra (ASSO) named after Uzeyir Hajibeyov. In the difficult socio-political years in the country, in the conditions of the economic crisis, the young conductor made a priceless contribution to the preservation of the leading orchestra of the republic. Y. Adigezalov conducted at home and abroad, having carried out numerous Baku premieres of the classical repertoire and actively promoted the works of Azerbaijani composers in the world.

January 20, 1991 (on the anniversary of the tragic events in Baku) ASSO and the Azerbaijan Choir Capella performed the Oratorio "Karabakh Shikestesi" by V. Adigozalov and "Stabat Mater" by A. Karamanov in the Great Hall of the Moscow Conservatory in the presence of the authors. March 1991, the orchestra toured the cities of the Far East (Yuzhno-Sakhalinsk, Petropavlovsk-Kamchatsky, Magadan) and Central Asia (1992).

1991–1993 – He was a conductor with the artistic director of "MOZART-festivals" held jointly with the Austrian government. World premieres of works of Azerbaijani and Austrian composers took place at three festivals.

1993 – First laureate in the category "Best Conductor of the Year" (Humay Award).

1994 – Made the first independent tour of the ASSO abroad – the orchestra opened the season with two concerts in the Istanbul Concert Hall "Jamal Rashit Rey" and performed in the antique Aspendos Amphitheater in Antalya in the presence of 7 thousand listeners. During his period of the leadership of the orchestra, performed over 40 world premieres and over 50 author's concerts of Azerbaijani composers.

October 16, 1998 – Ankara, the celebration of the 75th anniversary of the founding of the Republic of Turkey, the world premiere of the Oratorio "Chanakkale 1915" by V. Adigezalov, performed by the Presidential Symphony Orchestra and in the presence of President S. Demirel, which became an event in the cultural life of the Turkic world.

1998–2000 – He was the conductor of the State Symphony Orchestra of Radio – Television of Russia.

From 2000 – conductor of the Azerbaijan State Academic Opera and Ballet Theater ("The Magic Flute", "Aida", "La bohème", "Tosca", "Madama Butterfly", "Il tabarro", "Gianni Schicchi", "Cavalleria rusticana", "Pagliacci", "Carmen", "Eugene Onegin" (1990), "The Queen of Spades", "Aleko", "Scheherazade", "Romeo and Juliet", "Boléro", "L'Arlésienne", "Polovtsian Dances", "Sevil", "Don Quixote", "1001 Nights", "Natavan", "Nasimi", etc.).

2001 – 2004 – conductor of the Istanbul State Opera ("The Legend of Love", "Samson and Delilah", "Madama Butterfly", "Don Quixote", "Requiem"). "Prince Igor" opera by Borodin (director D. Bertman) was a huge success. This performance opened the International Opera Festival at the Aspendos Amphitheater in 2003.

From 2002, Adigezalov has been working closely with the Moscow Helikon Opera ("The Pretend Garden-Girl", "La Traviata", "Carmen", "Eugene Onegin", "Fledermaus", "The Queen of Spades", "Cinderella", etc.).

2007 – the presentation of the project "Azerbaijan Sympho-Mugam" took place. Together with the "Trio Karabakh" concerts were held in Brazil, Italy, Luxembourg, Turkey, China, Vietnam, Latvia, Ukraine and Belarus.

2011 – the world premiere of Giovanni Pacini's Requiem took place in Sicily. This event was a major achievement in promoting the composer's legacy.

The interpretation of maestro Adigezalov was beyond praise. Azerbaijani conductor led the Della Camerata Polifonica Siciliana choir and orchestra with exhilarating simplicity, confidently drawing the musicians along with him. Reading the rich score was significant and highly emotional.

— John Pasqualino

Maestro Adigezalov's conducting was amazing. He grasped the essence of the score and entered the difficult style of the composer. It was a lesson in real artistic skill.

— Maurizio Chiampi
professor of the Conservatory of Saint Cecilia in Rome, artistic director of the international festival "Bellini Eventi"

A high-class conductor who took up the challenge and won.

— De Mao
professor, one of the most influential experts on Bellini and Pacini

February 2013 – ASSO made a successful tour in Kuwait.

May 12, 2014 – in the Italian amphitheater Arena di Verona, in the presence of 10 thousand spectators, a symphony concert of works by Azerbaijani composers was held.

2018 – Artistic Director of the "Dede Gorgud" chamber orchestra, created under the patronage of the International Fund for Turkic Culture and Heritage, consisting of musicians from six Turkic-speaking countries. The orchestra toured the cities of Turkey, Azerbaijan and Finland.

June 26, 2019 – Heydar Aliyev Center in Baku, two hundred musicians from the ASSO, the Azerbaijan State Choir Capella, the Batumi Choir Chapel, the Tbilisi Conservatory Choir and soloists from Italy, Germany, Russia and Azerbaijan performed G. Verdi's "Requiem".

February 2020 – Musical director of the production of the opera "Cinderella" by L. Vainshtein at the Moscow theater Helikon Opera (director I. Ilyin).

Y.Adigezalov – the first of the Azerbaijani musicians to represent the country's culture in concert halls all over the world; Musikverein, Barbican Centre, Berliner Philharmonie, Cadogan Hall, Central Hall Westminster Abbey, Konzerthaus Berlin, Arena di Verona, Smetana Hall Prague, Cidade Das Artes and Theater Municipal do Rio de Janeiro, Linder Auditorium Johannesbur, Royal Conservatory of Brussels, as well as Riga Merchant Guild, in the opera halls of Beijing and Kuwait.

As a symphony conductor, has performed with such orchestras as: Royal Philharmonic Orchestra (RPO), Brazilian Symphony Orchestra, Orquesta Sinfónica del Estado de México, Johannesburg Philharmonic Orchestra (JPO), L'Orchestra Italiana del Cinema (OIC), Slovak Radio Symphony Orchestra, Vienna Chamber Orchestra, Zagreb Chamber Orchestra, Filarmonica Brașov (Romania), Karlovy Vary Symphony Orchestra, Budapest Danube Symphony, Junge Philharmonie Köln, as well as – Russian National Orchestra (RNO), Saint Petersburg Academic Symphony Orchestra, Philharmonic Orchestras of Moscow, Riga, Yekaterinburg, Minsk, Chișinău, Kharkiv, Astana, İzmir, Liepāja, Adana, Bishkek, Ankara Presidential Symphony Orchestra.

As an opera conductor, has collaborated with opera troupes in Kyiv, Minsk, Tashkent, Lviv, Chișinău, Tbilisi, Astana, Odesa, Samsun.

With outstanding soloists, including Mstislav Rostropovich, N. Petrov, B. Berezovsky, F. Badalbeyli, H. Shaham, I. Monighetti, S. Stadler, D. Kogan, P. Yablonsky, I. Biret, G. Onay, R. Galliano, Al Bano and others.

For more than a quarter of a century, Professor Adigezalov has been teaching at the Baku Music Academy, with his students holding the leading positions in the country.

== Discography ==
The conductor has recorded 16 CDs with the Tchaikovsky Symphony Orchestra, Istanbul Opera Orchestra, Russian Radio and TV Orchestra, Liepaja Symphony Orchestra, National Symphony Orchestra of Ukraine and Azerbaijan State Symphony Orchestra, which were released in the US, Turkey, Russia, South Korea (SONY), Germany (NAXOS) and England (OLIMPIA).

- 1993 – with the Tchaikovsky Bolshoi Symphony Orchestra 3 CDs:
1. Author's disc from F. Amirov's works: symphonic mughams "Kurd Ovshary" and "Gulistan Bayati Shiraz", "Azerbaijan Capriccio", "Tragic music of Nasimi"
2. K. Karaev: Symphonic poem "Leili and Majnun", Soltan Hajibeyov: Symphonic picture "Caravan", V. Adigozalov: Concerto for cello and orchestra, soloist – V. Simon. M. Mirzoev: Symphonic poem "After reading Saadi"
3. Uzeyir Hajibeyov: Overture to the opera "Ker-oglu", F. Tyuzun (Turkey): "Conversation" N. Halmamedov (Turkmenistan): "Symphonic Pictures", T. Mukhamedzhanov (Kazakhstan): "Love Poem" A. Sabitov (Uzbekistan): "Heroic Overture", M. Begaliev (Kyrgyzstan): "Symphonic Poem"
- 1997 – with Azerbaijan State Symphony Orchestra, for the first time in the history, 4 CDs of Azerbaijani opera, the Anthology "Classical Music of Azerbaijan" was recorded. Fikrat Amirov: Azerbaijan Capriccio, Kurd-Afshari, Nasimi, Arabian Nights; Gara Garayev: Leyli and Majnun, Seven Beauties, Path of Thunder; Soltan Hajibeyov: Karvan; Ogtay Zulfugarov: Holiday Overture; Vasif Adigezalov: Piano Concerto No. 4; Haji Khanmammadov: Concerto for Tar and Orchestra; Uzeyir Hajibeyov: Arshin Mal Alan; Muslim Magomayev: Shah Ismayil, Nargiz (excerpts); Gara Garayev & Jovdat Hajiyev: Vatan (Motherland), Fikrat Amirov: Sevil (excerpts).
- 1998 – the Tchaikovsky Symphony Orchestra, CD "Maestro Niyazi" (Niyazi – "Rast", P. Tchaikovsky – Romeo and Juliet, R. Wagner – The Entry and Death of Isolde.
- 2000 – with the State Symphony Orchestra of Radio – Television of Russia, CD P. Tchaikovsky – Francesca da Rimini; S. Rachmaninov – Symphony No.2.
- 2001 – the Istanbul Opera Orchestra, CD & DVD (full version) of the ballet "The Legend of Love" by A. Melikov.
- 2004 – Tchaikovsky Bolshoi Symphony Orchestra, CD "Leonid Weinstein" -Symphony No.6, Concerto for violin and orchestra (soloist D. Kogan), Symphonietta for string orchestra.
- 2019 – National Symphony Orchestra of Ukraine with soprano Seljan Nasibli. The album "Femmes Fatales" includes works by Bizet, Rimsky-Korsakov, Puccini, Shimanovsky, Barber.
- 2021 – Liepaja Symphony Orchestra (LSO) and the "Trio Karabakh"; СD "Azerbaijani Symphonic Mughams" (Niyazi "Rast" and V. Adıgözəlov "Segah").

== Awards ==
- 1993 – "Best Conductor of the Year" ("Humay" award)
- 2007 – Honored Art Worker of Azerbaijan
- 2012 – People's Artist of Azerbaijan
- 2015 – Winner of the "Best Musician of the Year" ("Zirva" award)
- 2019 – Shohrat Order

== Family ==
- Grandfather – Zulfugar (Zulfi) Samed Adigezalov (1898–1963), folk singer – "Khanende", a bright representative of the Karabakh School of mugham, Honored Artist of Azerbaijan.
- Father – Vasif Zulfugar Adigezalov (1935–2006), composer, pianist, public figure, teacher, one of the brightest students of Gara Garayev, first secretary of the Union of Composers, People's Artist of Azerbaijan, State Prize laureate, professor, holder of the "Şöhrət" "Istiqlal" orders.
- Mother – Khalida Aga-Ali Mammadbeyli, 1961 -2011 – teacher of the French language at the Azerbaijan Medical University.
- Brother – Togrul Vasif Adigezalov, resuscitator – anesthesiologist, candidate of medical sciences (I.M. Sechenov First Moscow State Medical University), PhD, a renowned organizer of public health.
- Uncle – Rauf Zulfugar Adigezalov (1940–2002), violinist (graduate of the Moscow P. I. Tchaikovsky Conservatory, Professor D.M. Tsyganov), vocalist, professor, Honored Art Worker of Azerbaijan.
