= Gayyur Yunus =

Azerbaijani painter (born 1948)

- Born: March 26, 1948 (age 78); Amirjan, Baku, Azerbaijan SSR, Soviet Union
- Education: Baku Art School named after Azim Azimzade; Tbilisi State Academy of Arts
- Awards

Yunusov Gayyur (sometimes spelled Gaiyur Yunus; born March 26, 1948) is an Azerbaijani painter, member of the Union of Artists of Azerbaijan, and People's Artist of the Republic of Azerbaijan.

== Early life ==
Gayyur Yunus was born on March 26, 1948, in the village of Amirjan in Baku. He graduated from middle school, then from 1967 to 1971 he studied at the Azim Azimzade Azerbaijan State Art School in Baku before attending the Tbilisi Art Academy from 1971–1977.

Yunus has been attending exhibitions since 1972. In 1980, he was admitted to Azerbaijani Artists' Association and Union of Artists of the USSR. When he was young, he came near his hometown relative Sattar Bahlulzada, and observed how he painted. He became a student of Bahlulzada and learned the various types of art.

Gayyur Yunus has said the following about his birthplace:

"I was born in this village, I received my first education here, and then I was attached to this village for life. Wherever I went, I always came back to Amirjan. Amirjan is the dearest place in the world for me. All of this is reflected in my creative work."

== Career and artworks ==
Due to official Soviet art policies, which required all exhibited artworks to conform to the style of Socialist realism, many of Yunus' works were not permitted to be shown in galleries until after the dissolution of the Soviet Union. In spite of this, he is noted as one of the artists who defined Azeri Soviet art in the period after the death of Stalin, when artists were allowed slightly more freedom. His work is characterized by smooth lines and bright colors (especially red, turquoise, and white on black backgrounds).

He joined and influenced the modern "Qajar art school", a style that prevailed in 18th- and 19th-century Southern Azerbaijan's portraiture and still life genres. While many of works are lyrical pieces and landscapes, he garnered a reputation for his stylized portraits of women, which were unusual in the Qajar art movement prior to Yunus' introduction in the 1970s. One of the main reasons that Yunus' portraits of Azerbaijani woman are shown in elegance and dignity is that "God is beautiful and loves beauty". He emphasizes the beauty and the Azerbaijani and Muslim character of the women he paints by focusing on their faces and national dress.

Yunus is Muslim, and Islam and Sufism are central themes in his work. Other themes include family relationships, beauty, Eastern philosophy, and the historical heritage of Azerbaijan. In some of Yunus' works, he combines abstractionism with the traditional miniature style. He paints his portraits in oil on canvas and includes background motifs such as pears, fish, birds, flowers, epigraphic writings, and Yunus' personal symbolism. He also includes calligraphy written in Arabic, with religious words and expressions such as "Allah", "Bismi Allah" ("in the name of Allah"), "Bismillahir-rahmanir-Rahim", "Alif", "Lam", "Mim", "Haqq" (truth), and "La ilaha Allah". He also writes in Azerbaijani and Cyrillic scripts.

11 individual exhibitions of Gayyur Yunus in Azerbaijan and various other countries have been held since 1972. His works are held in public and private collections in countries such as Germany, Turkey, the United States, France, Norway, Finland, Denmark, Holland, Syria, England, Poland, Algeria, Iran, and Russia. Since 1988, individual exhibitions have been opened in Baku, London, and Alma-Ata. Currently, Yunus' works are in the National Art Museum of Azerbaijan, the Tbilisi Folk Friendship Museum, the Pavlador Art Museum, the Tretyakov Gallery, the Moscow State Museum of Oriental Art, Musée de l'Orangerie in France, and the Rockefeller private collection in New York. His art has also appeared in shows at the YARAT contemporary artists' space, and his piece "Refugee" was featured on the back cover of Azerbaijan International in 1994. The artist's last individual exhibition was called "Hidden and visible", and was held at the Moscow State Museum of Oriental Art.

In 1994, Yunus' studio was located in the suburb of Amjiran, Baku.

=== List of artworks ===
Yunus has completed more than 200 works, including:

- Leyli and Majnun
- Light in desert
- Way to the Mosque
- Tabrizians
- Gurban Bayramatter m
- Eastern Women
- Refugee

== Awards ==
- Humay Award – 1995
- Artist of the Republic of Azerbaijan (Honorary title) – May 30, 2002
- Tərəqqi Medal – 18 October 2011
- People's Artist of the Republic of Azerbaijan (Honorary title) – December 30, 2015

== See also ==
- Azerbaijani art
- Calligraphy in Azerbaijani culture
- History of Azerbaijan
