= Ashraf Heybatov =

Azerbaijani painter (born 1951)

Ashraf Heybatov Əşrəf Heybətov
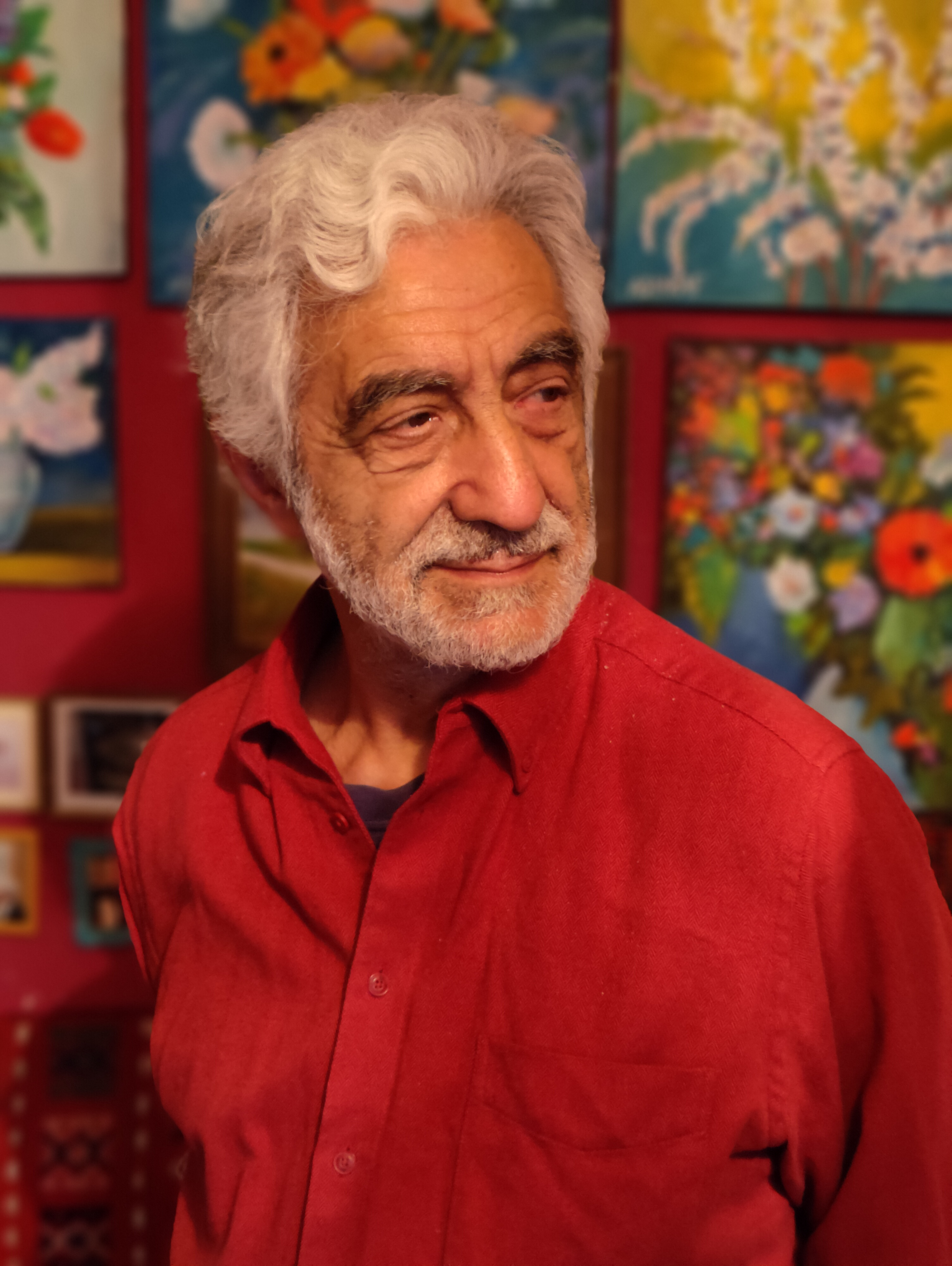
- Born: February 18, 1951 (age 74); Baku, Azerbaijan SSR, USSR
- Citizenship: Azerbaijan; Germany
- Occupation: painter
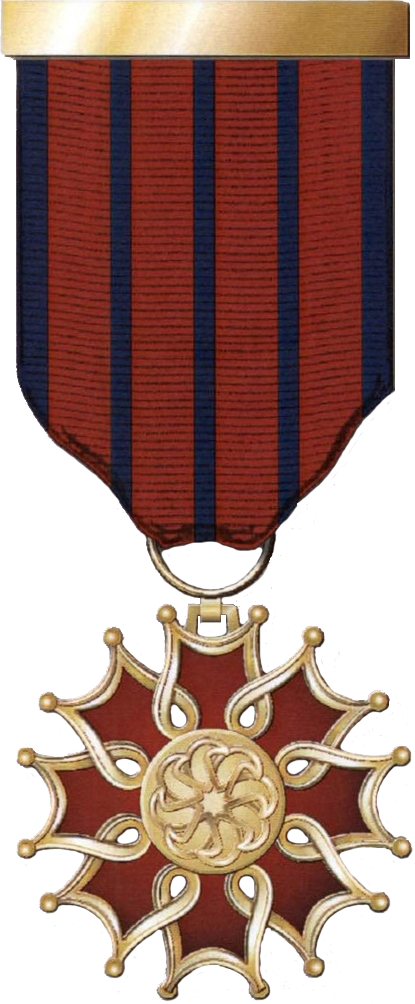
- Awards

Ashraf Nazir oghlu Heybatov (Azerbaijani: Əşrəf Nəzir oğlu Heybətov, born February 18, 1951) is the member of the Artists Federation of UNESCO, Chairman of the Association of Azerbaijani Cultural Figures in Europe, International Ambassador of Peace, Honorary Member of the Union of Artists of Azerbaijan, People's Artist of Azerbaijan (2018).

== Biography ==
Ashraf Heybatov was born on February 18, 1951, in Baku. He graduated from the Azerbaijan State Institute of Arts in 1979.

He is the Chairman of the Association of Azerbaijani Cultural Figures in Europe, International Ambassador of Peace, Honorary Member of the Union of Artists of Azerbaijan, a member of Union of Artists of Russia and the Russian Society of Oriental Studies, and has been a member of the Artists Federation of UNESCO since 1991.

== Awards ==
- People's Artist of Azerbaijan — May 27, 2018
- Honored Artist of Azerbaijan — 1991
- Taraggi Medal — March 13, 2006
