= Jahangir Rustamov =

Azerbaijani painter (1926–2007)

Jahangir Rustamov Cahangir Rüstəmov
- Born: March 5, 1926; Nukha, Nukha uezd, Azerbaijan SSR, TSFSR, USSR
- Died: February 13, 2007 (aged 80)
- Occupation: painter
- Awards: Honored Artist of the Azerbaijan SSR

Jahangir Mahmud oghlu Rustamov (Azerbaijani: Cahangir Mahmud oğlu Rüstəmov, March 5, 1926–February 13, 2007) was an Azerbaijani painter, People's Artist of Azerbaijan (2002).

== Biography ==
Jahangir Rustamov was born on March 5, 1926, in Nukha. In 1939-1941, he studied at the Azerbaijan State Azim Azimzade Art School. After finishing the art school, he entered the State Academic Institute of Fine Arts Surikov, but due to his family situation, he left his studies and returned to Baku.

He became a member of the Artists' Union of the USSR in 1955. Exhibitions of the artist were held in 1953, 1962, and 1973. His works were exhibited in 1979 exhibitions of Azerbaijani artists opened in other countries. In 2002, an individual exhibition of the artist was opened in the V. Samadova exhibition hall in Baku.

Jahangir Rustamov died in 2007.

== Awards ==
- People's Artist of Azerbaijan — May 30, 2002
- Honored Artist of the Azerbaijan SSR — 1982
