= Yalchin Rzazadeh =

Azerbaijani singer (1946–2021)

Yalchin Rzazade Yalçın Rzazadə
- Born: Yalchin Imran oghlu Rzazade; 31 December 1940; Boladi, Lankaran District, Azerbaijan SSR, Soviet Union
- Origin: Azerbaijan
- Died: 22 February 2021 (aged 80) Baku, Azerbaijan
- Genres: Estrada
- Occupation: Singer
- Years active: 1967–2021

Yalchin Rzazadeh (Azerbaijani: Yalçın Rzazadə, 31 December 1946 – 22 February 2021) also known as Yalchin Rzazade, was a Soviet Azerbaijani pop singer. He was also a People's Artiste of Azerbaijan (2000), a personal pensioner of the president of the Republic of Azerbaijan (since 2005), and the former head of the Department of Vocal and Pop Music at the Azerbaijan State University of Culture and Arts.

== Life ==
Yalchin Rzazade was born on December 31, 1946, in the village of Boladi, Lankaran district, into an intellectual family. In 1963, he entered the Azerbaijan State Institute of Culture and Arts and graduated from the acting faculty in 1967. In 1968, he was admitted to the Uzeyir Hajibeyov Azerbaijan State Conservatory, which he completed in 1973. In 1979, he was awarded the title of Honored Artist, and in 2000, he received the title of People's Artist. On April 1, 2005, he was granted a personal pension by the president of the Republic of Azerbaijan. Additionally, he was a two-time karate champion. He served as the head of the Department of Vocal and Pop Music at the Azerbaijan State University of Culture and Arts.

He was married and had three children. Yalchin Rzazade died on February 22, 2021, at the age of 74.

== Career ==
Yalchin Rzazade’s artistic journey began during his years in secondary school. His passion for the arts led him to the Azerbaijan State Institute of Culture and Arts, where he pursued studies in the Faculty of Acting. In 1968, he was admitted to the Faculty of Vocal Performance at the Uzeyir Hajibeyov Azerbaijan State Conservatory, from which he graduated with honors in 1973.

While still a student at the Conservatory, he began his professional career by joining the Azerbaijan State Television and Radio Committee as an assistant director. During his tenure at the Committee, he was invited to join Gulara Aliyeva’s Dan Ulduzu ensemble. Yalchin Rzazade first gained recognition among Azerbaijani audiences in the late 1960s with the song Durnalar, composed by Jahangir Jahangirov.

Throughout the years, he collaborated with numerous renowned composers, including Jahangir Jahangirov, Tofig Guliyev, Emin Sabitoglu, Oktay Kazimi, Telman Hajiyev, Elza Ibrahimova, Oktay Rajabli, Ramiz Mirishli, Nariman Mammadov, Kamal, Eldar Mansurov, and Firangiz Babayeva, who composed songs specifically for him. He was accompanied by various orchestras and ensembles, such as the Grand Symphony and Estrada-Symphony Orchestras, the Folk Instruments Orchestra, the Dan Ulduzu Instrumental Ensemble, the Sevil Vocal Ensemble led by Vagif Mustafazadeh, the Xatirə Ensemble directed by Ahsan Dadashov, as well as the Estrada-Symphony Orchestras under the direction of Yuri Silantyev and Alexander Mikhailov in the USSR, and the Jazz Ensemble led by Leibman in Leningrad.

During this period, Yalchin Rzazade was invited to play the leading role of Amir Bey in the film Od İçində (In the Fire). Although he received further offers for film roles, his extensive touring and concert performances across Azerbaijan prevented him from dedicating time to cinema. Nevertheless, he left an enduring mark on Azerbaijani cinema by lending his voice to the soundtracks of iconic films such as Dədə Qorqud, Gün Keçdi, Qaynana, Bayquş Qayıdanda, and Baladadaşın İlk Məhəbbəti.

Until his death, the People’s Artist continued to teach at the Azerbaijan State University of Culture and Arts.

== Awards ==
- Honored Artist
- People's Artiste of Azerbaijan (2000)
- Individual pension of the president of Azerbaijan Republic (2005)

== Filmography ==
- Meeting at the Wedding (film, 1970)
- Autumn Melodies (film, 1974)
- Dede Korkut (film, 1975)
- I Celebrate You, Motherland! (film, 1975)
- When the Owl Comes... (film, 1978)
- Gayınana (film, 1978)
- In the Fire (film, 1978)
- Yalchin (film, 2004)

== See also ==
- Giti Pashaei
- Parisa
