= Altay Hajiyev =

Azerbaijani painter (1931–2019)

Altay Hajiyev Altay Hacıyev
- Born: 2 April 1931; Baku, Azerbaijan SSR, TSFSR, USSR
- Died: 12 February 2019 (aged 87)
- Education: Baku Art School named after Azim Azimzade; Kyiv State Art Institute

Altay Hajiyev (Azerbaijani: Altay Hacıyev; 2 April 1931 – 12 February 2019) was a Soviet Azerbaijani painter. He was awarded the honorary title of People's Artist of Azerbaijan (2002).

== Early life ==
Altay Hajiyev was born on April 2, 1931, in the family of artist Amir Hajiyev. In 1951, he graduated from the art school called Azim Azimzade and also graduated from the Kiev State Art Institute in 1959. He has participated in international and national exhibitions since 1959. In 1960, he was admitted to the Union of Artists of the USSR. Between the years 1962–1967, he worked as the chief painter of the state Press Committee of the Azerbaijan SSR Council of Ministers. He was honored as an honorary artist in 1982 and a folk artist in 2002. He was awarded the Humay Award in 1995. Hajiyev has been presidential scholarship since 2003. Several individual exhibitions of the artists were held. Graphic work was organized in 1987, In 1991, "Natavan-Shusha ", in 2001, the "stars of our people" were thematic, as well as the 75th jubilee exhibitions in 2006. The artist's work is protected at Azerbaijan National Art Museum, Azerbaijan State Art Gallery, foreign museums and prestigious personal collections. During his work at "Azerneshr", he gets acquainted with well-known writers and poets of the time and learns about their creativity. He spent for a long time together among the renowned artists. He acquired a special place in the art world and signed of himself.

Haciyev's creativity attracts attention with its distinctive features. When he was studying in Ukraine, he learned the traditions of classical European painting. At the same time, he has always had an oriental sense of creativity, and he also benefited from the rich traditions of the fine arts of Azerbaijan. Thus, the subject of the work, artistic content of the idea, original style, composition arrangement, color resolution parallel to the two aspects of creativity, we can observe the artistic synthesis. Hajiyev spent a lot of time on the development of book graphics. He made various works of art and painted many works. The artist has also created many series. After graduating from his higher education, he returned to his homeland and saw the construction and reconstruction work in Baku in the 60s and the level of industrialised industrial cities of Baku and created the first series called "New Baku ". The new series, titled "Caspian", "pearl of the Sea" and "The owner of the Caspian Sea", allows us to analyse the first stage of the artist's creative activity. Hajiyev was not alone with the graphics of the book and tested the brush in the field of painting. The main line of painting work is the glorification of our glorious past, the historical personalities and the rich spiritual treasures. From the series "Khalgimizin Ulduzlari" "Tomris ", "Mahsati Ganjavi ", the works are remarkable, "Sara Khatun ", "Khurshudbanu natavan ", "Tuti bika ", "Ashig Pari ", "Aga Bayim Aga " and others.

== Awards ==
- Honorary Decree of the Presidium of the Supreme Soviet of the Azerbaijan SSR – 1968
- Honorary Artist of the Azerbaijan SSR - December 1, 1982
- "World of Fuzuli-500". Humay Award – 1995
- Open Society Institute Prize for Artistic Design of the Best Children's Book – 1999
- Honorary title of "People's Artist of the Republic of Azerbaijan" - May 30, 2002
- Personal pension of the President of the Republic of Azerbaijan - December 23, 2004
