= Tofig Aghababayev =

Azerbaijani painter (1928–2024)

- Tofiq Ağababayev
- Born: 8 September 1928; Baku, Azerbaijan SSR, Transcaucasian SFSR, USSR
- Died: 20 December 2024 (aged 96); Baku, Azerbaijan
- Education: Leningrad Vera Mukhina Higher School of Art and Design
- Occupation: Painter
- Awards: Honored Artist of Azerbaijan

Tofig Mammadali Aghababayev (Azerbaijani: Tofiq Məmmədəli oğlu Ağababayev, 8 September 1928 – 20 December 2024) was an Azerbaijani painter and a People's Artist of Azerbaijan (2007).

== Life and career ==
Tofig Aghababayev was born in Baku on 8 September 1928. From 1946 to 1951, he studied at the painting department of the Azerbaijan State Art School. In 1953–59, he studied at the ceramics-glass department of the Leningrad Vera Mukhina Higher School of Art and Design.

From 1966 to 1968, he worked as the first chief artist of Baku city.

Aghababayev's works are kept in the National Art Museum of Azerbaijan, the foundation of the Union of Artists of Azerbaijan, in the museums of the USA, London, Canada and many other countries and private collections.

Aghababayev died on 20 December 2024, at the age of 96.

== Awards ==
- People's Artist of Azerbaijan — 29 December 2006
- Honored Artist of Azerbaijan — 4 March 1992
