= Nadir Gasimov =

Soviet Azerbaijani painter (1926–2000)

Nadir Gasimov Nadir Qasımov
- Born: May 22, 1928; Baku, Azerbaijan SSR, USSR
- Died: March 10, 2000 (aged 71)
- Education: Saint Petersburg Academy of Arts
- Occupation: painter
- Awards: Honored Artist of the Azerbaijan SSR

Nadir Sadig oghlu Gasimov (Azerbaijani: Nadir Sadıq oğlu Qasımov; May 22, 1928—March 10, 2000) was a Soviet Azerbaijani painter, who was awarded the title of the People's Artist of the Azerbaijan SSR.

== Biography ==
Nadir Gasimov was born on May 22, 1928, in Baku. In 1941–1946, he studied at the Azim Azimzade Baku Art School. In 1947–1953, he continued his studies at the Saint Petersburg Academy of Arts. His portrait and landscape works were successfully exhibited at international and national exhibitions in 1953–1954.

About 50 landscape and portrait works dedicated to ancient and modern China by the artist were displayed in his first individual exhibition organized in 1961 at the National Art Museum of Azerbaijan.

Gasimov's creativity covered a period of more than half a century, from the end of the 1940s to the year 2000. His works have been exhibited many times in more than 50 countries around the world—in the US, Canada, Mexico, Belgium, Germany, Italy, England, France, Egypt, Yugoslavia, India, Lebanon, Bulgaria, Mongolia, Hungary, Romania, Poland, Czechoslovakia, Cuba, Turkey and has been awarded various diplomas and honorary degrees. About 100 works of the artist are in museum collections in Russia, museums in CIS countries, museums in the US, Belgium, France, Germany, Turkey, Spain, Bulgaria, Yugoslavia, Czechoslovakia, and private collections.

In 1958–1969, Gasimov was elected to the board of directors of the Union of Artists of Azerbaijan, and in 1967–1969, he was elected a deputy of the Baku City Council for three terms. In 1970–2000, he was engaged in teaching activities at the University of Arts, where he was a professor within the Department of Painting.

Gasimov died on March 10, 2000.

== Awards ==
- People's Artist of the Azerbaijan SSR — June 9, 1959
- Honored Artist of the Azerbaijan SSR — July 7, 1967
- Medal "For Distinguished Labour" — June 9, 1959

== See also ==
- List of Azerbaijani artists
- List of People's Artists of the Azerbaijan SSR
