= Kazimov =

Kazimov (Azerbaijani: Kazımov) is a masculine surname of Azerbaijani origin; the female form is Kazimova. It is a slavicised version of the Arabic male given name Qasim. It may refer to the following notable people:

- Aygün Kazımova (born 1971), Azerbaijani singer
- Davud Kazimov (1926–2015), Azerbaijani painter
- Dilara Kazimova (born 1984), Azerbaijani singer
- Narmin Kazimova (born 1993), Azerbaijani chess player
- Salahaddin Kazimov, Internal Troops major general
