= Aghaali Ibrahimov =

Azerbaijani painter (born 1946)

Aghaali Ibrahimov Ağaəli İbrahimov
- Born: February 6, 1946 (age 80); Baku, Azerbaijan SSR, USSR
- Education: Azerbaijan State Art Institute
- Occupation: painter

Aghaali Musallim oghlu Ibrahimov (Azerbaijani: Ağaəli Müsəllim oğlu İbrahimov, born February 6, 1946) is an Azerbaijani painter, the secretary of the Union of Artists of Azerbaijan, and a People's Artist of Azerbaijan (2006).

== Biography ==
Aghaali Ibrahimov was born on February 6, 1946, in Baku. After graduating from high school, he studied at the Azim Azimzade State Art School from 1960 to 1966, and at the Azerbaijan State Art Institute from 1969 to 1974. Since 1966, he has participated in national and international exhibitions, his works have been exhibited in Russia, Turkey, the United States, France, Germany, Italy, Great Britain, Syria, Bulgaria and other countries.

Aghaali Ibrahimov has been a member of the Union of Artists of Azerbaijan since 1975.

== Awards ==
- People's Artist of Azerbaijan — December 29, 2006
- Honored Art Worker of Azerbaijan — May 30, 2002
