= Zülfü =

Zülfü is a Turkish given name for males. Notable people with the name include:

- Zulfu Adigozalov (1898–1963), Azerbaijani folk singer
- Zülfü Livaneli (born 1946), Turkish musician, author, poet, and politician
