= Sadig =

Sadig is a given name. Notable people with the name include:

- Sadig Guliyev (born 1995), Azerbaijani footballer
- Sadig Rahimov (1914–1975), Azerbaijani politician
- Sadig Zarbaliyev (born 1951), Azerbaijani drummer
- Nadje Sadig Al-Ali (born 1966), German-Iraqi academic
- Mirza Sadig Latifov (1852–1901), Azerbaijani poet
