= People's Artiste of Azerbaijan =

Azerbaijani culture award

People's Artiste of Azerbaijan Azərbaycan Respublikasının xalq artisti
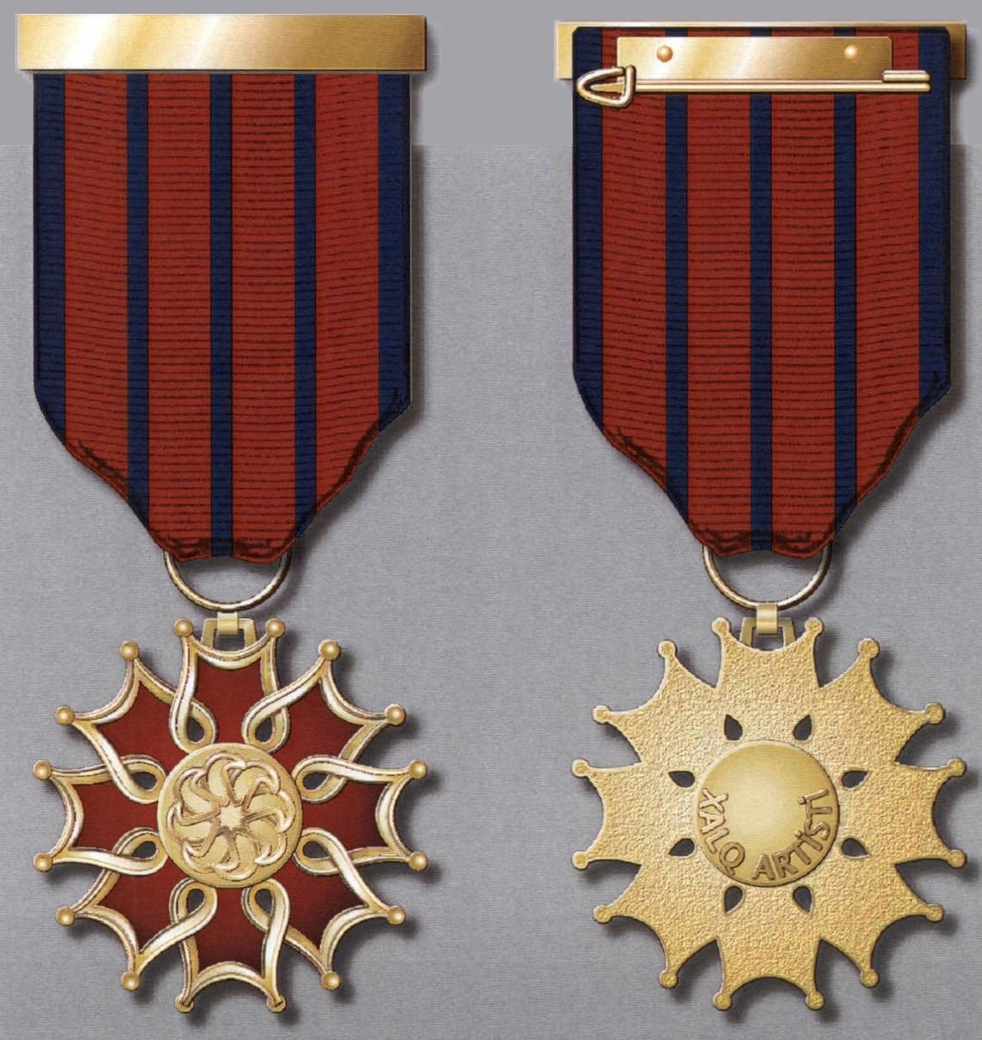
- People's Artiste of Azerbaijan, from 2009 to present
- Awarded for: Theater, cinema, music fields

People’s Artiste of Azerbaijan (Azerbaijani: Azərbaycan Respublikasının xalq artisti) is the honorary title granted for contribution to the development of Azerbaijani culture. The term artiste refers to a professional entertainer, and awards creative success in the theater, cinema and music fields of art in the Republic of Azerbaijan. It was preceded by the People's Artiste of the Azerbaijan SSR (1931–1991).

== Assignment ==
The honorary title "People's Artiste of Azerbaijan" was established by Decree of the President of the Republic of Azerbaijan dated May 22, 1998, along with some other titles. The President of Azerbaijan confers the honorary title on his initiative, as well as on the proposal of the National Assembly and the Cabinet of Ministers.

The title is awarded only to citizens of Azerbaijan. According to the decree, the honorary title of "People's Artiste of Azerbaijan" cannot be awarded to the same person repeatedly. A person awarded an honorary title may be deprived of the title in cases of misconduct. Persons awarded the honorary title "People's Artiste of Azerbaijan" also receive a certificate and a badge of the honorary title of the Republic of Azerbaijan. The badge of honor is worn on the right side of the chest.

== List of People's Artistes of Azerbaijan ==
- Nasiba Abdullaeva
- Nazakat Teymurova
- Yalchin Rzazade
- Gulaga Mammadov
- Mirnadir Zeynalov
- Polad Bulbuloglu
- Emin Agalarov
- Sadig Zarbaliyev

== See also ==
- People's Artist of Azerbaijan
- People’s Writer of Azerbaijan
- Orders, decorations and medals of Azerbaijan
