= Kamil Khanlarov =

Soviet-Azerbaijani painter

- Kamil Əlabbas oğlu Xanlarov
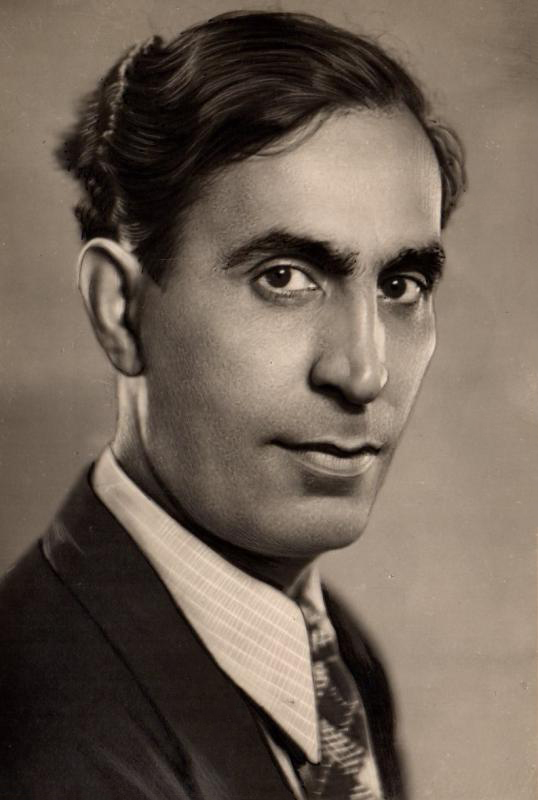
- Khanlarov in 1954
- Born: Kamil Ali Abbas oglu Khanlarov; March 9, 1915; Baku, Russian Empire
- Died: January 15, 1996 (aged 80); Baku, Azerbaijan
- Resting place: Second Alley of Honor
- Education: Azerbaijan State Art College
- Spouse: Roshan Zergerli
- Awards: Honored Artist of the Azerbaijan SSR; 1964; People's Artist of Azerbaijan; 1992
- Patrons: Salam Salamzadeh
- Website: https://xanlarov.az

Kamil Ali Abbas oglu Khanlarov (Azerbaijani: Kamil Əlabbas oğlu Xanlarov; 1915 – 1996) was a Soviet-Azerbaijani painter. He had received the honorary titles of the Honored Artist of the Azerbaijan SSR in 1964, and the People's Artist of Azerbaijan in 1992.

== Early life ==
Kamil Khanlarov was born on 9 March 1915, in Baku, then part of the Russian Empire. He entered Azerbaijan State Art College in 1931 and graduated in 1935. Among his teachers was Salam Salamzadeh. At that time, the outbreak of World War II limited Khanlarov's access to higher education.

== Career ==
Khanlarov's debut work was Meeting in the Village, which had a historical theme and was presented during an exhibition in 1932, Khanlarov mostly focused on historical themes, as well as portraits before and during the World War II. Examples of his works in historical themes include Meeting in the Village (1932), Mazdak Before Execution (1941), The Peasant Uprising in Tovuz (1940), Javanshir in the Battle Against the Invaders (1982), Reception of the Russian envoy by Fatali Khan, Meshadi Azizbekov Among the Peasants, and among his portraits are Aqa Mirak, Sultan Mohammed, Qatran Tabrizi, Nizami Ganjavi, Javanshir, Imadaddin Nasimi and others.

His later works were mostly in the genre of landscape. Lyrical emotionality and color mastery occupied an important place in Khanlarov's works. He has worked in many regions of Azerbaijan, painting the nature of Nakhchivan, Ordubad, Julfa, Sharur, Karabakh, Shusha, Zagatala, and Astara. Examples of such works by Khanlarov are The Mountains of Zagatala (1946), Astara (1955), Talysh Mountains (1956), The Outskirts of Shusha (1957), Shusha (1964), Evening in Bilgah (1964), On the Shores of Araz (1965), Norashen Valley (1968), On the Southern Border (1972), The View of Murovdag (1972), On the Shores of Julfa Araz (1973), The Scenery of Shusha (1983), The Jeyranbatan Lake (1987). Khanlarov also went on a creative trip to Czechoslovakia in 1961. His paintings dedicated to Czechoslovakia include A Street in Prague, A Square in Karlovy Vary, A Golden Street, A Tower in Prague, and A Monument to Jan Gus.

Khanlarov also painted still lifes. His Oriental Still Life (Şərq natürmortu) depicts Azerbaijani household objects against a background of traditional fabric.

Kamil Khanlarov's works were exhibited in Austria, Hungary, Romania, Germany, Egypt, Iraq, Canada, Syria, Norway, France, Finland, Japan, Iran, Afghanistan, Turkey and Poland. His works are kept in several museums, galleries and private collections in Azerbaijan.

Kamil Khanlarov also worked as a teacher at the Azerbaijan State Art College from 1938 to 1985. He taught modern Azerbaijani artists such as Tahir Salahov, Togrul Narimanbekov, Elmira Shahtakhtinskaya, Tofig Agababayev, Rasim Babayev, Hafiz Mammadov and Ali Verdiyev. Painter Agali Ibrahimov also studied under Khanlarov. In 1939, Khanlarov became a member of the Union of Artists of the Azerbaijani SSR. He was awarded the honorary titles of Honored Artist of the Azerbaijan SSR in 1964, and People's Artist in 1992.

=== Cinema and theatre ===
Khanlarov designed men's costumes for the film Kəndlilər and worked as a costume designer on Fatali Khan. He also created the stage design for a 1947 production of Abdulla Shaig's play Nushaba.

=== Solo exhibitions ===
Solo exhibitions of Khanlarov's work were held in Baku in 1961, 1966, 1985 and 1995. In June 2010, the Azerbaijan State Museum of Art hosted a posthumous exhibition marking the 95th anniversary of his birth, organised by Azerbaijan's Ministry of Culture and Tourism.

== Death ==
Kamil Khanlarov died in 1996, in Baku, the capital of Azerbaijan.

== See also ==
- List of Azerbaijani artists
