= Arif Gaziyev =

Azerbaijani visual artist (1937–2021)

- Arif Shamil ogluGaziyev; Arif Şamil oğlu Qaziyev
- Born: 1937; Erivan, Armenian SSR, Soviet Union
- Died: 2014; Baku, Azerbaijan
- Education: Baku Art School; Moscow Art Academy
- Known for: Painting and sculptor
- Awards: Honored Artist of the Republic of Azerbaijan; People's Artist of Azerbaijan

Arif Shamil oglu Gaziyev (January 2, 1937 – September 3, 2021) was an Azerbaijani painter, sculptor and People's Artist of Azerbaijan (2018).

== Life ==
Arif Gaziyev was born on January 2, 1937, in Erivan, Armenian SSR. He graduated from Azim Azimzade Baku Art School in 1958 and studied at V. Surikov Art Academy in Moscow (1965). After completing his education, he worked as a teacher at Baku Art University. His works are famous and painted in various genres. Examples of these are "Babak", "Bust of Hussein Javid", "Girat is waiting for us", "Caucasian eagles", "Battle", "Live gala", "Horror", "Cold", "Two boomerangs". Since 1957, he had participated in republican, all-Union and international exhibitions. His works are kept in various museums ("Girl from Baku", "Mohammed Nasireddin Tusi" – Azerbaijan State Art Museum named after R. Mustafayev, "Beauty of the Field" – Museum of Oriental Arts (Moscow)), as well as in private collections in the US, Germany, Austria and Turkey.

Gaziyev died in Baku, Azerbaijan on September 3, 2021, at the age of 84.

== Family ==
Arif Gaziyev's father Shamil Gaziyev was a famous sculptor. Arif Gaziyev was married to Firangiz Faringiz Gaziyeva and their sons Emin and Samir work as sculptors, and their daughter Ilaha is an artist-designer.

== Awards ==
- Honored Artist of the Republic of Azerbaijan
- On May 27, 2018, he was awarded the honorary title of People's Artist of Azerbaijan.
