= Honored Cultural Worker of Azerbaijan =

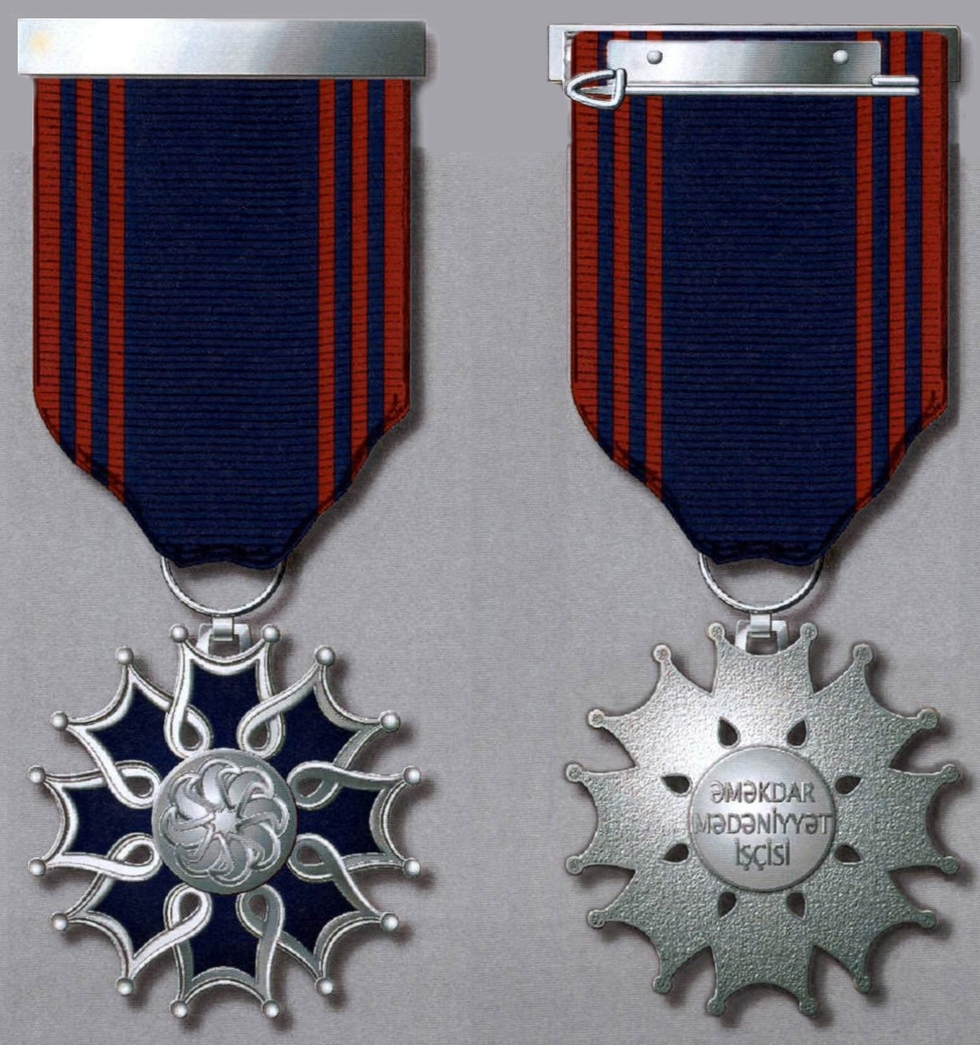
- Awarded for: Excellence in art, culture, education, etc.
- Date: May 22, 1998
- Country: Azerbaijan
- Reward(s): Certificate and badge

“Honored culture worker” (Azerbaijani: Əməkdar mədəniyyət işçisi) is a state honorary title of decoration awarded by Azerbaijan an honorary title given by the Decree of the President of the Republic of Azerbaijan on approval of the Regulations on Honorary Titles of the Republic of Azerbaijan.

== Conditions ==
The honorary title of the Republic of Azerbaijan was given by the President of the Republic with the submission of the National Assembly or the Cabinet of Azerbaijan to qualified employees of organizations and institutions worked in art, culture, education, editorial offices of newspaper and magazine, multimedia enterprises, radio and television, persons who have amateur talent activities and other employees of cultural institutions and organizations.

The Honorary Title Certificate and its badge are presented in the ceremonial and public place by the President of Azerbaijan. Citizens who are awarded honorary titles of the Republic of Azerbaijan wear the badge on the left chest.

This honorary title is given to citizens of Azerbaijan as well as foreigners. They have to have worked in this field at least 20 years. It is not given to a person for the second time.

A person awarded the honorary title may be deprived of the honorary title in the case of:

- conviction for a serious crime;
- committing an offense that tarnishes the honorary title.

== See also ==
Heydar Aliyev Prize

Heydar Aliyev Order
