= Asaf Jafarov =

Azerbaijani painter (1927–2000)

Asaf Jafarov Asəf Əli İskəndər oğlu Cəfərov
- Born: Asaf Ali Alexander oglu Jafarov; 28 July 1927; Baku, Azerbaijan SSR, Soviet Union
- Died: 3 April 2000 (aged 72); Baku, Azerbaijan
- Occupation: Painter
- Awards: People's Artist of the Azerbaijan SSR

Asaf Jafarov (Azerbaijani: Asəf (Ağasəf) Əli İskəndər oğlu Cəfərov; 28 July 1927, in Baku – 3 April 2000, in Baku) was a Soviet Azerbaijani painter, he was awarded the title of People's Artist of the Azerbaijani SSR.

== Early life and education ==
Asaf Jafarov was born on 28 July 1927 in Old City (Baku). His first education was at a painting school named after Azim Azimzade from 1945 until 1950. From 1951 until 1957, he continued his education at Surikov Moscow Art Institute, where one of his professors was Vasiliy Nechitailo.

== Works ==
His works include portraits of Vagif Mustafazade, Niyazi, Jafar Jabbarly, Aliagha Vahid, Arif Malikov, Rashid Behbudov, and Vajiha Samadova.

Other paintings include "Snow in Baku", "Caspian Sea", "Absheron", "Winter in Baku", "Spring", "A Hot Day", "Winter", "Mashtagha Village", "Buzovna Village", "Evening Time", "Nasimi is in the assembly of free thinkers" and "Awakening".

He won the "Grand Prix" at "The World Art Exhibition" in Austria (1980).

== Death ==
Jafarov died on 3 April 2000 in Baku, Azerbaijan.

== See also ==
- List of Azerbaijani artists
- List of Azerbaijani painters
