= Honored Artist of the Republic of Azerbaijan =

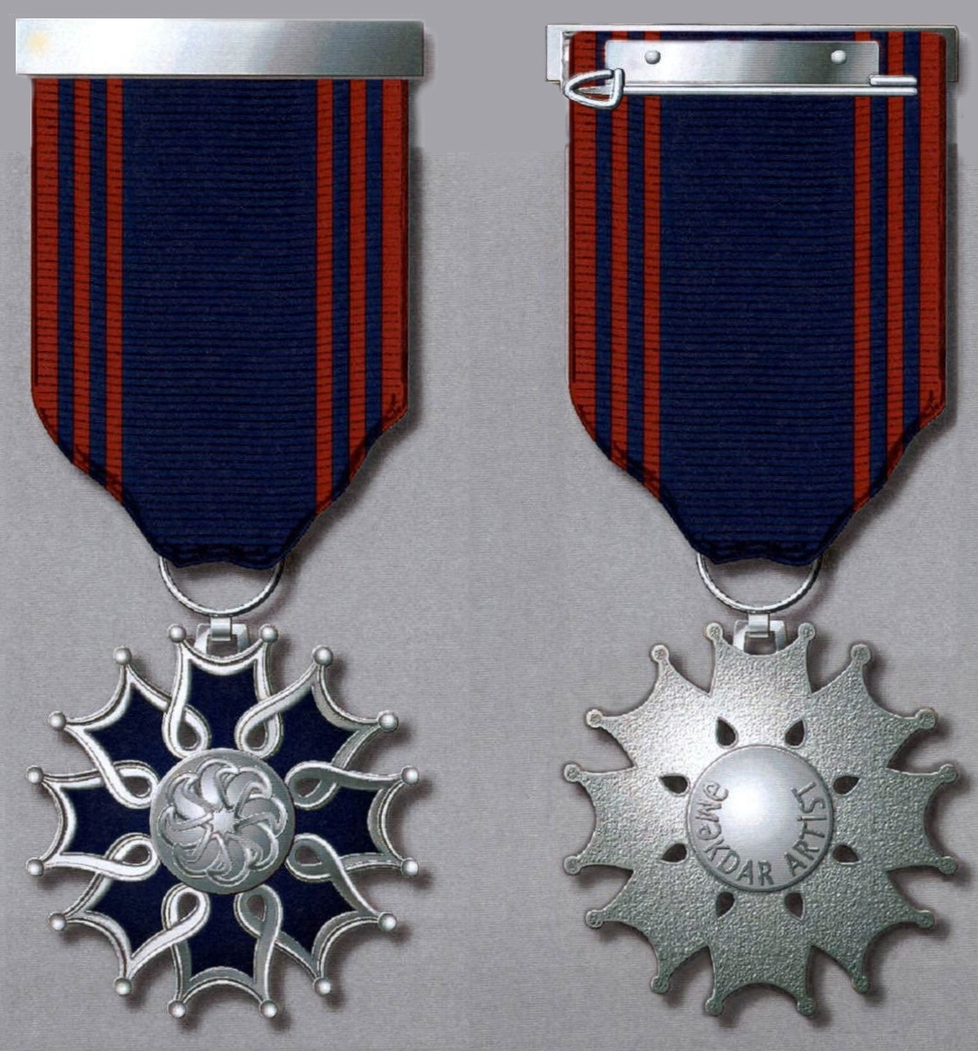
- The medal of the Honored Artist of the Republic of Azerbaijan
- Native name: Azərbaycan Respublikasının əməkdar artisti
- Type: medal, honorary title
- Awarded for: achievements in performing arts
- Country: Azerbaijan
- Status: in existence

Highlights
- Total: c. 4578

Precedence
- Next (higher): People's Artist of Azerbaijan

Honored Artist of the Republic of Azerbaijan (Azerbaijani: Azərbaycan Respublikasının əməkdar artisti) is a performing arts award and honorary title of Azerbaijan. According to statute, it is bestowed to "artists of cinema, theater, circus, ensemble, a cappella, orchestra and choir conductors, ballet masters, artistic directors of music, choir, dance and other collectives, musicians, as well as television and radio program announcers for their services to the development of Azerbaijani art". It is the second-highest artistic award of Azerbaijan, after People's Artist of Azerbaijan.

Established on 22 May 1998, the award superseded that of the Honored Artist of the Azerbaijan SSR bestowed during the Soviet era. As of 2024, there were 4578 Honored Artists of the Republic of Azerbaijan who received the accompanying salary of 150 manats.
