= Aydin Dadashov =

Azerbaijani film critic and professor

Aydin Dadashov Aydın Dadaşov
- Born: March 1, 1952; Aghdam, Azerbaijan SSR, USSR
- Died: March 15, 2017 (aged 65); Baku, Azerbaijan
- Occupations: film critic, screenwriter, film director
- Awards: State Prize of the Azerbaijan SSR

Aydin Arshad oghlu Dadashov (Azerbaijani: Aydın Ərşad oğlu Dadaşov, March 1, 1952—March 15, 2017) was an Azerbaijani film critic, director, doctor of sciences in philology, professor, Honored Art Worker of Azerbaijan (2005), and laureate of the State Prize of the Azerbaijan SSR (1988).

== Biography ==
Aydin Dadashov was born on March 1, 1952, in Aghdam. In 1972, he graduated from the economics department of the Azerbaijan Institute of National Economy. In 1980, he graduated from the Leningrad State Institute of Theatre, Music, and Cinema, the faculty of dramatic art, and in 1982, he graduated from two-year higher directing and screenwriting courses in Moscow.

In 1975, Aydin Dadashov worked as a director of feature films director and editor for feature films at Azerbaijanfilm cinema studio named after J. Jabbarly. Since 1989, he has worked at the "Television and Radio Journalism" department of the Faculty of Journalism of Baku State University. Since 2000, he has been an associate professor of the same department, and since 2006, a professor of the department. He was the head of the "Film Studies" department of the "Cinema and Television" faculty of the Azerbaijan State University of Culture and Arts.

He was the director of about 30 films and the scriptwriter of about 50 films.

Aydin Dadashov died of a sudden cardiac arrest on March 15, 2017.

== Awards ==
- Honored Art Worker of Azerbaijan — 2005
- State Prize of the Azerbaijan SSR — 1988
