= Ogtay Shikhaliyev =

Azerbaijani painter (1931–2012)

Ogtay Shikhaliyev Oqtay Şıxəliyev
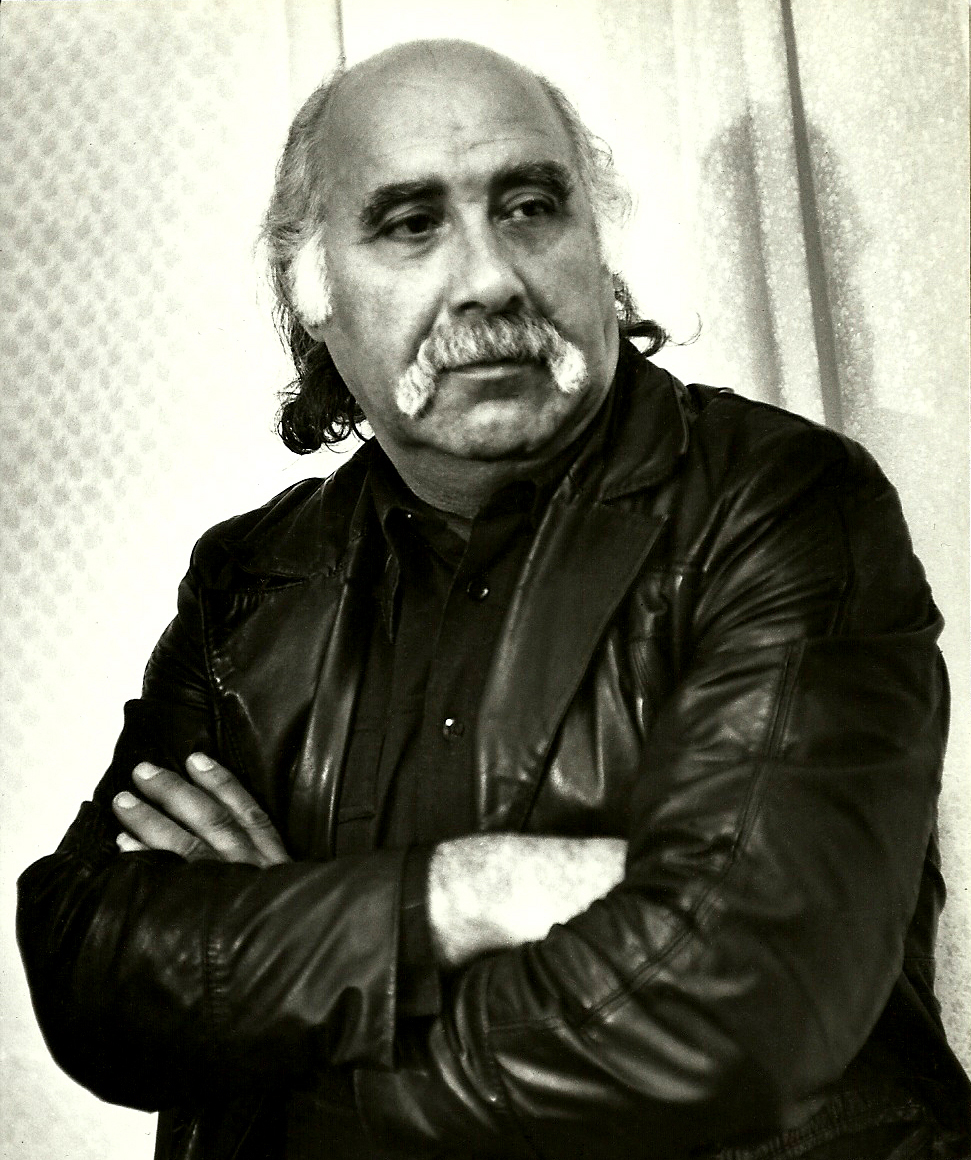
- Born: September 3, 1931; Baku, Azerbaijan SSR, TSFSR, USSR
- Died: January 31, 2012 (aged 80); Baku, Azerbaijan
- Education: Leningrad Vera Mukhina Higher School of Art and Design
- Occupation: painter

Ogtay Yusif oghlu Shikhaliyev (Azerbaijani: Oqtay Yusif oğlu Şıxəliyev, September 3, 1931–January 31, 2012) was an Azerbaijani painter, People's Artist of Azerbaijan (1992).

== Biography ==
Ogtay Shikhaliyev was born on September 3, 1931, in Baku. In 1947–1952, he studied at the Azim Azimzade Art School. After graduating from the art school with honors, he was admitted to the Leningrad Vera Mukhina Higher School of Art and Design. He participated in exhibitions from 1955 while studying in Leningrad. In 1958, after graduating from the Higher Art School, he returned to Baku. In 1957, he was awarded the first place in decorative arts at the All-Union Youth Exhibition Festival.

In 1960, he became a member of the Artists' Union of the USSR. Since 1964, he started teaching at the M. Aliyev Art Institute. He worked as a teacher and professor at the Azerbaijan State Academy of Fine Arts.

Ogtay Shikhaliyev died on January 30, 2012, in Baku after a long illness.

== Awards ==
- People's Artist of Azerbaijan — March 4, 1992
- Honored Artist of the Azerbaijan SSR — December 1, 1982
- Jubilee Medal "In Commemoration of the 100th Anniversary of the Birth of Vladimir Ilyich Lenin"
