= Rafiz Ismayilov =

Azerbaijani film artist (1939–2025)

Rafiz Ismayilov Rafiz İsmayılov
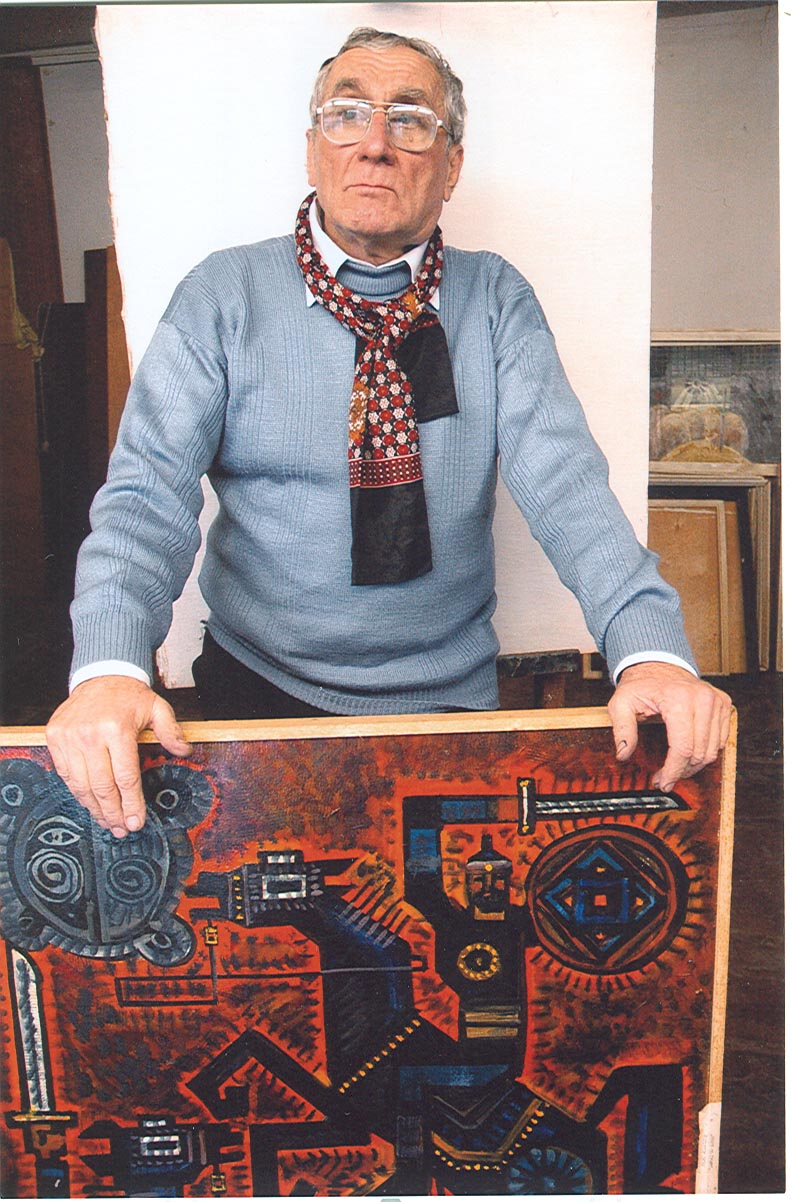
- Ismayilov in 2019
- Born: 30 March 1939; Baku, Azerbaijan SSR, USSR
- Died: April 2025 (aged 86)
- Education: Gerasimov Institute of Cinematography
- Occupation: Painter
- Awards: People's Artist of Azerbaijan; Honored Artist of the Azerbaijan SSR; State Prize of the Azerbaijan SSR; Soltan Mahammad Award

Rafiz Rza oghlu Ismayilov (Azerbaijani: Rafiz Rza oğlu İsmayılov, 30 March 1939 – April 2025) was an Azerbaijani film artist, director, screenwriter, artist assistant, decor artist, People's Artist of Azerbaijan (2000).

== Biography ==
Ismayilov was born in Baku on 30 March 1939. In 1962, he graduated from the Azerbaijan State Art School. In 1966–1972, he studied at the art faculty of the All-Union State Institute of Cinematography in Moscow. He worked at the "Azerbaijanfilm" film studio from 1972 onwards. He was the designer and director of many feature films and theater plays, and the artist and director of several animated films. Rafiz Ismayilov was also the designer of several books. Ismayilov died in April 2025, at the age of 86.

== Awards ==
- State Prize of the Azerbaijan SSR – 1978
- Honored Artist of the Azerbaijan SSR – 1 December 1982
- People's Artist of Azerbaijan – 18 December 2000
- Soltan Mahammad Award – 2006
- The Golden Fairy Award – 2015
