= Eldar Mikayilzade =

Azerbaijan carpet designer (born 1956)

Eldar Mikayilzade Eldar Mikayılzadə
- Born: Eldaru Idayat oghlu Mikayilzade; January 18, 1956 (age 70); Amirjan, Baku, Azerbaijan SSR, USSR
- Education: Art School of Azerbaijan; Russian Academy of Arts
- Awards: People's Artist of Azerbaijan (2018)

Eldar Mikayilzade (Azerbaijani: Eldar Mikayılzadə; born 1956) is an Azerbaijani carpet design master, visual artist, and graphic designer. He is a member of the Union of Artists of Azerbaijan (2018), USSR Union of Artists (1986), Russian Artists Union (2004), and UNESCO. He designed one of the first sketches of the Azerbaijani manat currency. He has been awarded the title of People's Artist of Azerbaijan (2018).

== Early life and activities ==
Eldar Mikayilzade was born in 1956 in the Amirdjaan village of Baku in Azerbaijan SSR, Soviet Union.

From 1971 to 1975, after graduating from the Fine Arts faculty of Baku Art School named after Azim Azimzade, he graduated from the Azerbaijan State Institute of Arts in Decorative Applied Art, specializing in carpeting. He continued his education at the then Leningrad Academy of Arts. He devoted his first works of art in 1977 to his native village and named it the New Hila as a sign of love. Since 1984 he has started his career as a carpet artist.

Initially he worked at the Azerbaijan Academy of Sciences, carpet weaving department, then worked as a chief painter at the Azherkhalcha Scientific Creative Production Union. He continued his labor activity as Deputy General Director and Chief Executive Officer. Later, he created his own "Khali" company. Since 1993 he has been deputy chairman of the Cultural Affairs Department of the Caucasian Muslims. He has also been a member of the Union of Artists of the USSR since 1986 and a member of the Union of Artists of the Russian Artists Union and UNESCO since 2004.

His works are kept in private collections in Russia, Great Britain, France, Turkey, Saudi Arabia, and Kuwait.

== His works ==
=== Carpets ===
- "Yeni Xilə" - 1977.
- "Səttar dünyası" - 1979.
- "Şəbi-hicran-1" - 1981.
- "İthaf" - (These rwo carpets dedicated to Sattar Bahlulzade and Latif Kərimov);
- "Azərbaycan nağılları".
- "114. Bismillah".
- "Nağıllar aləmi" - 1983.
- "Azərbaycanın poeziya və musiqi korifeyləri" - 1983-1984.
- "Xətai" - 1990.
- "Xəmsə" - 1991.
- "İslam" - 1992.
- "Təbriz - 1993.
- "Bürclər - 1994.
- "Xilaskar" - 1995-1997.
- "Üç din" - 1998.
- "Səttar" - 1999.
- "Bismillahir-rəhmanir-rəhim" - 2001.
- "Üç peyğəmbər" - 2003.
- "Şəbi-hicran-2" - 2006.
- "Yaranış"[3] - 2010.
- "Səttarın arzusu" - 2012.
- "Kəhkəşan" - 2012.

=== Banknotes ===
- 1 manat
- 5 manat
- 10 manat
- 50 manat
- 100 manat
- 250 manat
- 500 manat
- 1000 manat
