= Tahir Tahirov =

Azerbaijan artist

- Born: May 30, 1948; Baku, Azerbaijan SSR, USSR
- Died: September 12, 2019 (aged 71)
- Occupation: painter
- Awards: Honored Artist of Azerbaijan

Tahir Rashid oghlu Tahirov (Azerbaijani: Tahir Rəşid oğlu Tahirov, May 30, 1948–September 12, 2019) Azerbaijani scenic painter, painter, People's Artist of Azerbaijan (2013).

== Biography ==
Tahir Tahirov was born on May 30, 1948, in Baku. In 1973, he graduated from the art faculty of Azerbaijan State Institute of Arts.

At various times, he worked at the Azerbaijan State Academic National Drama Theatre, the State Theatre of Young Spectators, and the State Academic Russian Drama Theatre. He worked as a set designer at the Azerbaijan State Academic Opera and Ballet Theater.

Tahir Tahirov died on September 12, 2019.

== Awards ==
- People's Artist of Azerbaijan — June 25, 2013
- Honored Artist of Azerbaijan — May 30, 2002
