= Fuad Salayev =

Azerbaijani sculptor (born 1943)

- Born: September 24, 1943; Baku, Azerbaijan SSR, USSR
- Occupation: sculptor
- Awards

Fuad Salayev (born 1943) is an Azerbaijani sculptor and teacher. He was awarded the title People's Artist of Azerbaijan.

== Biography ==
He was born in 1943. He graduated from Azerbaijan State Art School named after A. Azimzade and went to Moscow and graduated from Surikov Moscow Art Institute.

Furthermore, he was involved in many exhibitions of the Soviet Union, and he had many creative projects with the Russian Academy of Arts. He created the public monument of poet Sergei Yesenin, which was his first major work. But the poet's monument in Russia at that time was not raised yet. He is also the vice rector of the Russian Academy of Arts.

Salayev was honored with the Shohrat Order. Salayev was named an academician of the Russian Academy of Arts.

== See also ==
- List of Azerbaijani artists
