= Alakbar Rezaguliyev =

- Ələkbər Rzaquliyev
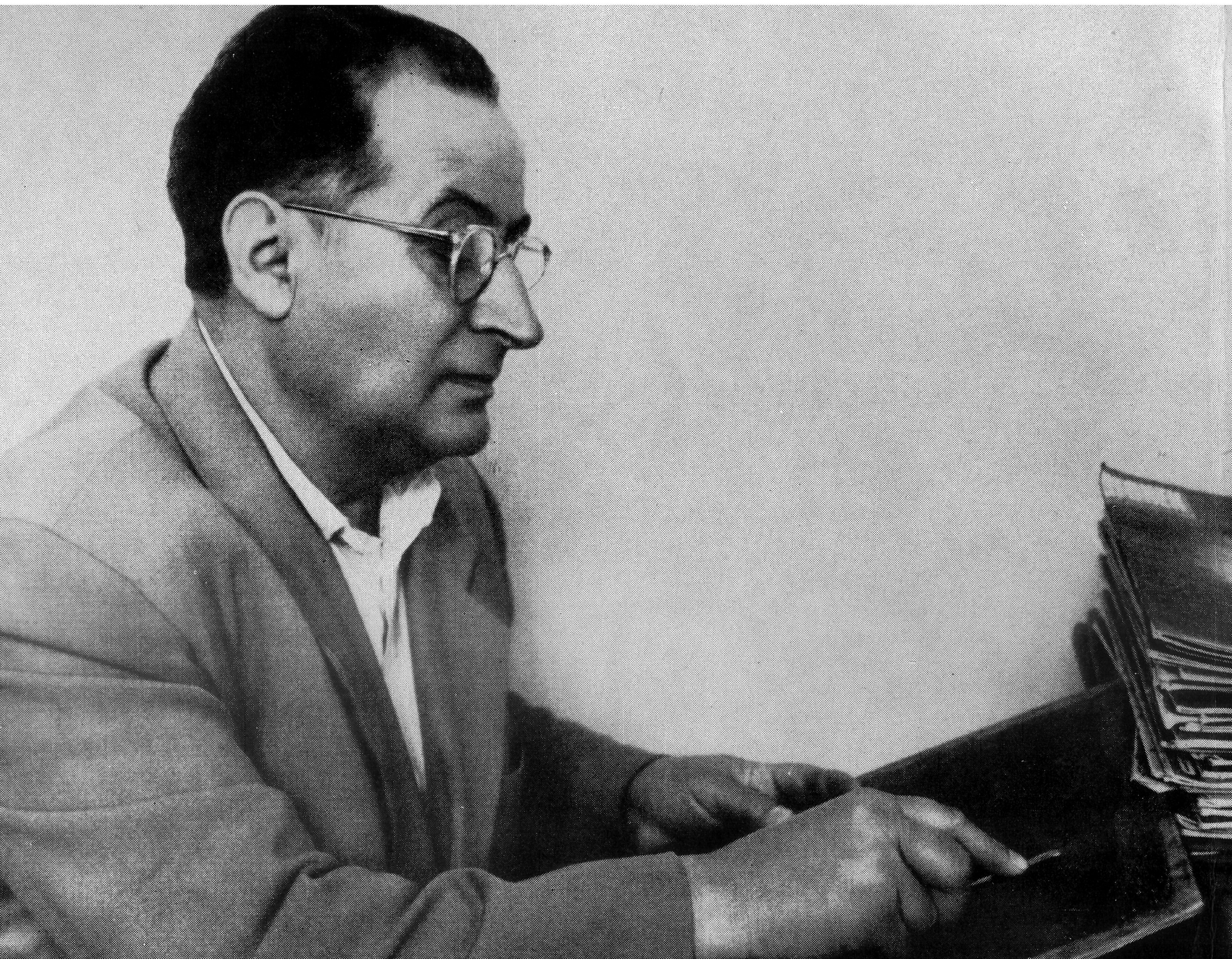
- Born: Rzaquliyev Ələkbər Ələsgər oğlu January 31, 1903; Baku, Baku Governorate, Russian Empire
- Died: January 31, 1974 (aged 71); Baku, Azerbaijan SSR, USSR
- Occupation: Painter
- Awards: Honored Artist of the Azerbaijan SSR

Alakbar Rezaguliyev (31 January 1903 in Baku, Baku Governorate – 31 January 1974 in Baku) (alternative spelling: Alekper Rzaguliyev) (Azerbaijani: Ələkbər Rzaquliyev; Russian: Алекпер Рзакулиев) was an Azerbaijani artist. He was awarded the title Honored Artist of the Azerbaijan SSR (1964).

== Early life ==
Alakbar was born in Baku, into the large family of a small businessman-shopkeeper. Although there were no artists in his family, Rezaguliyev showed artistic talent at an early age. He studied at Moscow Technical Art College from 1925 to 1928. After graduation, he returned to Baku.

== Years in exile ==
Alakbar Rezaguliyev was among the first artists to be arrested in Azerbaijan in what would later be termed as Stalin's Repression, in which an estimated 70,000 Azerbaijanis were executed or exiled along with hundreds of thousands of other citizens throughout the USSR.

All in all, Alakbar was arrested and sent to Gulag labor camps three times and spent more than 23 years of his life in exile: (1) Arkhangelsk at the Solovetsky Monastery in 1928; (2) Krasnoyarsk in Siberia in 1937, (3) and Altai, Central Asia in 1949.

The first time he was arrested because one of his friends was accused of "Pan-Turkism," and Alakbar was deemed guilty by mere association. But when he was sentenced, he didn't even know what he was being accused of or why. He was sentenced to six years. After being released, he returned to Baku and married Sona Huseinova in 1935; the couple had two daughters, Adila and Sevil. He and Sona later divorced.

On November 3, 1937, Alakbar was arrested a second time. He later told fellow Azerbaijani artist Rasim Babayev how it had happened: "One day I was walking down Komsomolskaya Street when I ran into Ruhulla Akhundov (one of the Bolsheviks who helped establish the Soviet system in Azerbaijan). "Ruhulla looked annoyed at seeing me and remarked rudely: 'Hey, dumb guy, are you back here again?' And with those words, I was sent directly back to prison".

It was in Altai that he met and married a German woman named Berta, who had been sent to Siberia from a German settlement in the Saratov Autonomous Region of Russia. When World War II broke out, Joseph Stalin exiled all Germans living in the Soviet Union. Alakbar and Berta had two sons, Ogtay and Aydin, and a daughter, Sevda.

== After Exile ==
After Stalin died in 1953, tens of thousands of prisoners were released from prison. Alakbar, too, was among those who eventually were able to return to Azerbaijan. The exile greatly affected his personality. He became very serious and morally broken. It even affected his creative activity. He very seldom used colors after returning home. The harsh experiences of imprisonment that he had suffered for more than two decades, after all, had been his fate merely through association and not based on any crime that he had ever committed himself.
