= Honored Art Worker (Azerbaijan) =

Title of honor of Azerbaijan

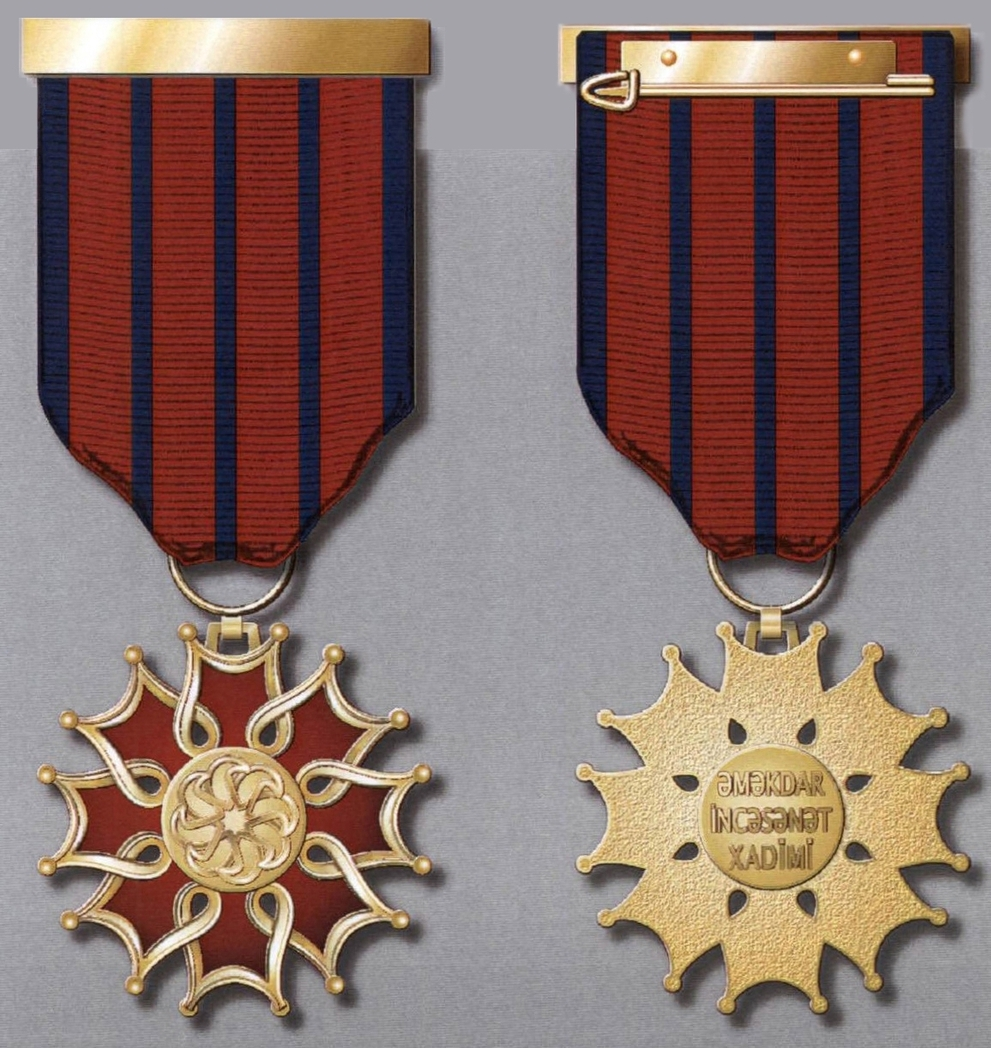
- Date: May 22, 1998
- Country: Azerbaijan
- Presented by: President
- Hosted by: Composers, directors, conductors, playwrights, screenwriters, filmmakers, art critics and literary critics

"Honored Art Worker" (Azerbaijani: Əməkdar incəsənət xadimi) is one of state honorary titles of Azerbaijan, awarded by the Decree of the President of the Republic of Azerbaijan based on approval of the Regulations on Honorary Titles of the Republic of Azerbaijan.

== Canditions ==
The honorary title "Honored Art Worker" is awarded to outstanding composers, directors, conductors, playwrights, screenwriters, filmmakers, art critics, and literary critics who create scientific and dramaturgical works in the field of art, as well as performances, films, and art.

The Honorary Title Certificate and its badge are presented in the ceremonial and public place by the President of Azerbaijan. Citizens who are awarded honorary titles of the Republic of Azerbaijan wear the badge on the left chest. This honorary title is given to citizens of Azerbaijan as well as foreigners. They have to have worked in this field for at least 20 years. It is not given to a person for the second time.

A person awarded the honorary title may be deprived of the honorary title in the case of:

- conviction for a serious crime;
- committing an offense that tarnished the honorary title

== List of Honored Art Workers of Azerbaijan ==
- Hidayat Orujov
- Manaf Suleymanov
- Elza Ibrahimova
- Natig Rasulzadeh
- Vidadi Muradov
- Rauf Adigozalov
- Aydin Dadashov
- Aghaali Ibrahimov

== See also ==
- Heydar Aliyev Prize
- Heydar Aliyev Order
