= Alakbar Huseynov =

Azerbaijani actor and puppeteer (1961–2007)

- Ələkbər Hüseynov
- Born: Alakbar Adigozal oglu Huseynov; July 7, 1961; Baku, Azerbaijani SSR, USSR
- Died: August 2, 2007 (aged 46); Baku, Azerbaijan
- Education: Baku Puppet Theatre
- Occupations: Actor, puppeteer, comedian, theater director
- Years active: 1983–2007
- Spouse: Afag Huseynova
- Children: 2

Alakbar Huseynov (Azerbaijani: Ələkbər Hüseynov; July 7, 1961 – August 2, 2007) was an Azerbaijani actor, puppeteer, comedian, and theater director. He was the former head director of the Baku Puppet Theatre, and was an Honored Artist of Azerbaijan (2000). Huseynov was famous for his comedy roles, but also was the host of the children's television show, Each of Us is a Flower.

== Career ==
Huseynov was born on July 7, 1961, in Baku. He graduated from the Azerbaijan State University of Culture and Arts in 1982.

Huseynov started his career in Shaki State Drama Theater. From 1988, he was an actor of Baku Puppet Theatre; and from 2006 until 2007 he was the director of this theater. In 1994, Huseynov was a laureate of the Humay Award. In 2007, he was awarded with Order of the Smile.

Huseynov died on August 2, 2007, aged 46, from Hepatitis C.
