= Vasif Adigozalov =

Azerbaijani composer (1935–2006)

- Born: Vasif Zülfüqar oğlu Adıgözəlov; July 28, 1935; Baku, Azerbaijan SSR
- Died: September 15, 2006 (aged 71) Baku, Azerbaijan
- Occupation: composer
- Instrument: piano

Vasif Zulfugar oghlu Adigozalov (alternative spellings: Adigezalov, Adygozal) (Azerbaijani: Vasif Zülfüqar oğlu Adıgözəlov; 28 July 1935 – 15 September 2006) was one of Azerbaijan's most distinguished composers. He is the son of khananda Zulfu Adigozalov, brother of violinist and singer Rauf Adigozalov and the father of conductor Yalchin Adigozalov.

== Career ==
Vasif Adigozalov excelled both as a composer and a performer. He majored in Piano as well as Composition at the Azerbaijani Conservatory (now Baku Music Academy). His piano professor was Simuzar Guliyeva and throughout his career, he gave numerous concerts on stage as a pianist and accompanist. In the early 1960s, he accompanied legendary Azerbaijani singer Rashid Behbudov (1915–1989). Later on, he pursued a solo career and performed his own pieces.

Adigozalov is best known for incorporating traditional modal mugham music into his works – both orchestral and solo pieces. He owed his knowledge of traditional music to his father Zulfu Adigozalov (1898–1963), a prominent khananda singer of Azerbaijani mugham.

Vasif Adigozalov was greatly influenced by Gara Garayev (1918-1982), the distinguished Azerbaijani composer and teacher with whom Vasif had studied at the Azerbaijan Conservatory in 1953-1959.

Although Adigozalov had become seriously ill in the last few years of his life, he continued to carry out his responsibilities both at the Azerbaijan Composers' Union where he was Chairman (1990–2006), and the Music Academy where he had taught since 1961, and where he had chaired the Department of Choral Conducting (1992–2006).

== Recognition ==
Vasif Adigozalov enjoyed official recognition as the recipient of Azerbaijan's highest national awards – People's Artist of Azerbaijan (Khalg Artisti, 1989), State Prize (Dovlat Mukafati, 1990), Glory (Shohrat Order, 1995), and Independence Orders (Istiglal Ordeni, 2005).

Had Vasif Adigozalov written only "Carnation" (1960), which dozens of Azerbaijani singers have performed in various arrangements, his place in the history of Azerbaijani music and culture would have been assured. Adigozalov wrote "Carnation" at the age of 25, as a tribute to Natavan (1832–1897), a famous 19th-century poet and ruler of Karabakh – a mountainous region known for being a cultural center in Azerbaijan.

Vasif Adigozalov's works continue to be appreciated and performed by Azerbaijani pianists of all generations.

== Compositions ==
Operas: The Dead (1963), Natavan (2003).

Operettas: Haji Gara (with Ramiz Mustafayev) (1958), The Daily Scenes (1962), Granny's Happiness (1971), Let's Get Divorced and Married Later (1976), The Devil Eye (1985).

Oratorios: Land of Fire (1987), Garabagh Shikastasi (1989), Chanakkale (1998), Caravan of Sadness (1999).

Cantatas: My Novruz (1994), Solemn Cantata (1998).

Symphonic Music: Four symphonies (1958, 1970, 1973, 1998-Segah), Symphonic poems: Heroic (1957), Africa Struggles (1961), Stages (1968); Festive Overture (1978), Poem for Four Pianos and Orchestra (1982), Four Concertos for Piano and Orchestra (1961, 1964, 1985, 1994), Concerto for Violin and Orchestra (1961), Concerto for Cello and Orchestra (1990).

Instrumental Music: Sonatina for Cello and Piano (1957), Sonata for Piano (1957), Scherzo for Violin and Piano (1958), Piano Pieces for Children (1959), 24 Piano Pieces for Children (1961), Poem Apotheosis: Two Pianos & Orchestra (1980), Sonata for Cello (1987), Mugham Sonata for Organ (1988), 24 Preludes for Piano (1995).

More than 150 songs and romances. Soundtracks for plays, documentaries and films.
