= Mirnadir Zeynalov =

Azerbaijani painter (1942–2021)

- Born: 12 November 1942; Baku, Azerbaijan SSR, USSR
- Died: 10 March 2021 (aged 78); Baku, Azerbaijan
- Occupation: Painter
- Awards: Honored Artist of Azerbaijan

Mirnadir Mirali oghli Zeynalov (Azerbaijani: Mirnadir Mirəli oğlu Zeynalov, 12 November 1942 – 10 March 2021) was an Azerbaijani painter, People's Artist of Azerbaijan (2006).

== Biography ==
Zeynalov was born on 12 November 1942, in Baku. In 1963, he graduated from Azim Azimzade Art School, and then in 1973 from the Faculty of Graphics of the Moscow Polygraphic Institute. He was a full member of Union of Artists of Azerbaijan and "New Era" World Academy of Arts.

Zeynalov's professional painting career began in the 1970s. In the early years of his career, he started to create realistic and later abstract paintings.

The artist's works were exhibited in Moscow, Kyiv, Houston, Los Angeles and other cities, and in 2013 they gained value at the Sotheby's auction in London. His valuable works are kept in the fund of National Art Museum of Azerbaijan and Azerbaijan State Art Gallery.

Zeynalov died on 10 March 2021, at the age of 78.

== Awards ==
- People's Artist of Azerbaijan — 29 December 2006
- Honored Artist of Azerbaijan — 4 March 1992
