= Sadig Zarbaliyev =

Sadig Zarbaliyev Sadıq Zərbəliyev
- Born: April 11, 1951 (age 74); Kurdamir District, Azerbaijan SSR, USSR
- Instrument: naqareh

Sadig Siraj oghlu Zarbaliyev (Azerbaijani: Sadıq Sirac oğlu Zərbəliyev, born April 11, 1951) is an Azerbaijani naqareh master, People's Artiste of Azerbaijan (1998).

== Biography ==
Sadig Zarbaliyev was born on April 11, 1951, in Kurdamir District. After graduating from high school, he went into military service in 1969. After completing his military service, he came to Baku in 1973 and worked together with People's Artists Vali Gadimov and Aftandil Israfilov in the ensemble of Honored Artist Baba Salahov. Since 1975, Sadig Zarbaliyev has been working together with People's Artist of the USSR Zeynab Khanlarova.

== Awards ==
- People's Artiste of Azerbaijan — May 24, 1998
