= Baba Salahov =

Azerbaijani musical artist (1923–1981)

- Born: February 5, 1923; Baku, Baku uezd, Azerbaijan SSR, TSFSR, USSR
- Died: August 12, 1981 (aged 58); Baku, Azerbaijan SSR, USSR
- Instrument: tar

Aghababa Aliheydar oghlu Salahov (Azerbaijani: Ağababa Əliheydər oğlu Salahov, February 5, 1923 — August 12, 1981) was an Azerbaijani tar master, Honored Artist of the Azerbaijan SSR (1964).

== Biography ==
Baba Salahov was born on February 5, 1923, in Baku. He learned to play tar from Ahmad Bakikhanov. From 1940 until his death, he was the concertmaster of the Azerbaijan State Orchestra of Folk Instruments. In 1965, he created the Orchestra of Folk Musical Instruments of Azerbaijan Television and Radio and led it until the end of his life. Here he accompanied Hajibaba Huseynov, Rubaba Muradova, Shovkat Alakbarova, Sara Gadimova, Abulfat Aliyev, Yagub Mammadov, Zeynab Khanlarova, Aghakhan Abdullayev, Sakina Ismayilova, Alim Qasimov and other famous singers.

The ensemble headed by Baba Salahov has been called "Araz" since 1981. The ensemble has been named after Baba Salahov since 1992. His recordings are stored in the fund of Azerbaijan Television.

Baba Salahov died on August 12, 1981, in Baku.

== Awards ==
- Honored Artist of the Azerbaijan SSR — June 29, 1964
