= Vasiliy Nechitailo =

Vasili Nechitailo (1915–1980) was a Soviet Socialist realist artist from Salsk in the Kuban region of Russia who studied art in Moscow.

He is known for "heroic propaganda of the Stalinist era – huge paintings like Glory to the Great Stalin (1950) by Yury Kugagh, Vasily Nechitailo and Victor Tsyplakov".

A retrospective exhibit in Minnesota, USA, described his work: "He is recognized for his remarkable artistic style-Nechitailo’s innate sense of color and unique color solutions were acclaimed by his fellow artists and as well as art critics. Throughout his career, his native Kuban retained an irresistible fascination for him and he frequently traveled from Moscow to southern Russia to portray the vastness of freshly ploughed fields and dazzling golden mountains of harvested wheat shoveled by sunburnt collective farmers. His bold and lavish brushstrokes are highly expressive and the interplay of pictorial elements often dominates the subject matter. Nechitailo’s great mastery in conveying spontaneous and unsentimental beauty through his virtuoso use of paint has made him one of the most renowned Russian artists of the 20th century."

== Monument ==
Monument to Nechitailo
- Памятник Нечитайло (Russian)
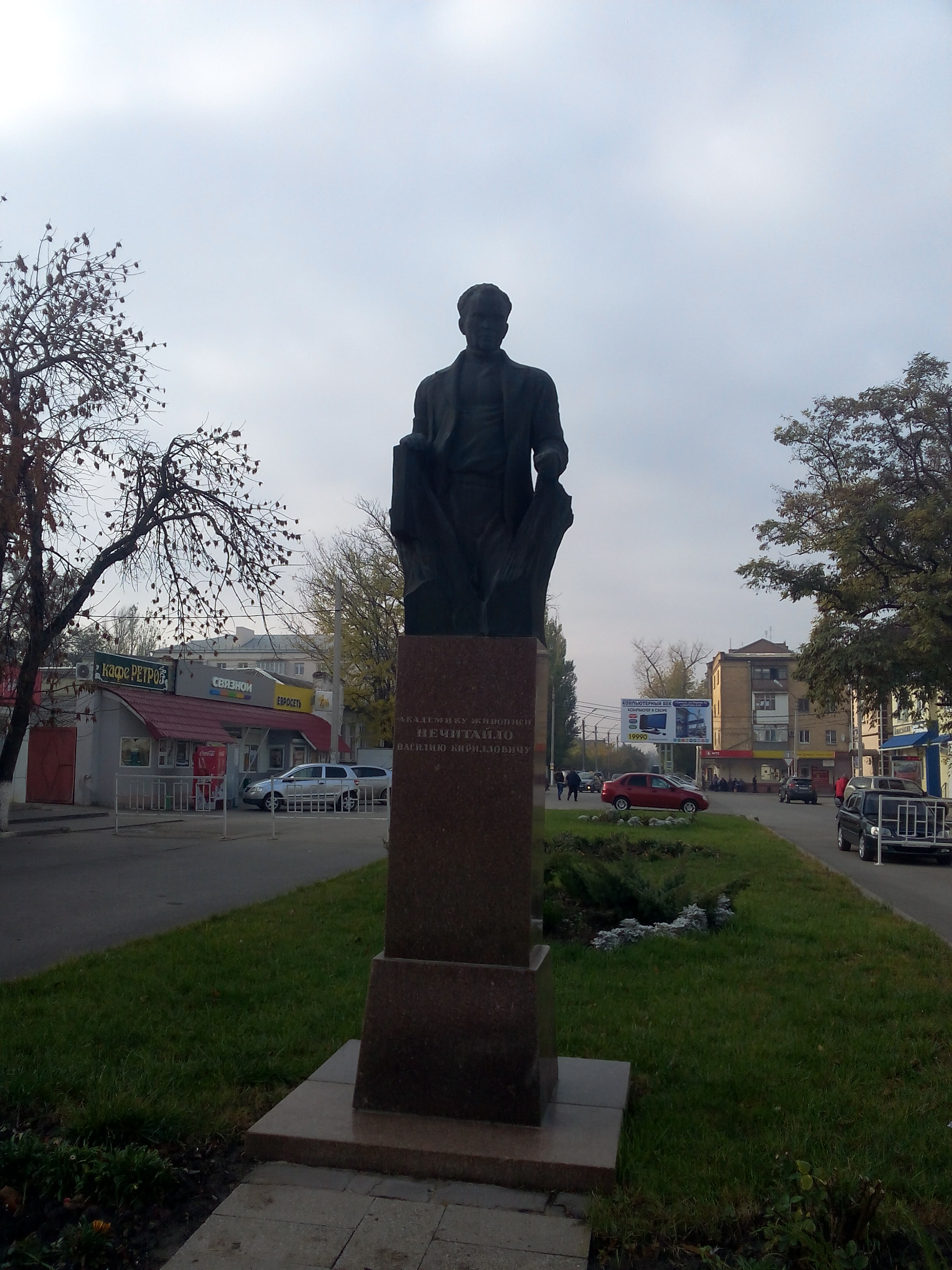
- Type: Monument
- Location: Azov, Rostov oblast Russia

History
- Built: 1989

Site notes
- Architect: Vyacheslav Snegiryov

There is a monument to him in Azov, which was dedicated in 1989.
