= Rasim Babayev =

Soviet and Azerbaijani painter (1927–2007)

- Born: 31 December 1927; Baku, Azerbaijani SSR, Soviet Union
- Died: 24 April 2007 (aged 79); Baku, Azerbaijan
- Occupation: Painter
- Awards: Honored Art Worker of the Azerbaijan SSR People's Artist of the Azerbaijan SSR

Rasim Hənifə oğlu Babayev (31 December 1927 – 24 April 2007) was a painter, Honored Art Worker and People's Artist of the Azerbaijan SSR.

== Biography ==
Rasim Babayev was born in Baku, in 1927. He studied at Painting School named after Azim Azimzade in 1945-1949. Later he studied at Surikov Moscow Art Institute in 1949-1956. In 1959 he was admitted to the Union of Artists of Azerbaijan.

The artist went on creative trips to foreign countries, and his personal exhibitions dedicated to different countries were held many times. The artworks he created are kept in museums, galleries and private collections in many countries also in Tretyakov Gallery and Museum of Oriental Art. In 1964, Rasim Babayev was awarded the title of Honored Art Worker of the Azerbaijan SSR and in 1989, he was awarded the title of People's Artist of the Azerbaijan SSR.

Although part of the artist's creative work was not accepted in the Soviet era, it did not disappoint him, and he created with more earnestness. Examples of works created by the artist in long work table graphics are "Oil Tanks" (1958), "Oil Refilling" (1958), "Girl" (1958), "Black City" (1958), Dashkasan Road (1961), "Portrait of a Worker" (1962), "In Germany" (1963), "Gobustan" (1964), "Khinalig" (1964), "Camels" (1966), "Baths" (1969), "Gachag Nabi" (1969), "Old Baku" (1970), “Pomegranates”(1970), "Village" (1970), “Ancient Cemetery” (1970), “Artist A. Rzaguliyev” (1970) and others. "Land" (1963), "Coast" (1965), "Road" (1966), "Near East" (1967), "Family" (1971), "Traveler" (1974), "Army" (1978), "Door” (1982), “Woman" (1983), "War" (1983), "Novruz"(1983), "Woman and Giant" (1986), "Tragedy” (1987), "Adam and Eve" (1988), "Camel Loaded" (1992), "Trouble" (1997), "Night" (2003), "Giants"(2004) and others can be examples to his paintings.

Folklore of Azerbaijan - tales and epics, their deep philosophical essence, national-moral values and national ethnographic features made a huge impact to the formation of Rasim Babayev's worldview and the creation of his creative world. Rasim Babayev had also been successful in the field of book graphics. He was the author of literary illustrations of folk tales of Azerbaijan and works of prominent writers as Nazim Hikmet, Theodore Dreiser, Yusif Vazir Chamanzaminli, Rabindranath Tagore and others.

On October 29, 2014, the exhibition of Rasim Babayev's works was held in the Marble Palace of the Russian Museum in St. Petersburg. The Vice-president of the Heydar Aliyev Foundation Leyla Aliyeva attended the exhibition.

Rasim Babayev died on April 24, 2007, in Baku.
