= Davud Kazimov =

Azerbaijani painter (1926–2015)

Davud Kazimov Davud Kazımov
- Born: November 9, 1926; Baku, Baku uezd, Azerbaijan SSR, TSFSR, USSR
- Died: February 14, 2015 (aged 88); Baku, Azerbaijan
- Occupation: painter

Davud Mehdi oghlu Kazimov (Azerbaijani: Davud Mehdi oğlu Kazımov, November 9, 1926 — February 14, 2015) was an Azerbaijani painter. He was awarded the title of People's Artist of Azerbaijan (1992).

== Biography ==
Davud Kazimov was born in 1926 in Baku. In 1945, he graduated from the Azerbaijan State Art School, and since 1947 he had been a permanent participant of republican and all-Union exhibitions.

Davud Kazimov is also known as a master of graphics in Azerbaijani fine art. He worked more in the field of book illustration. Among his illustrations are drawings based on the stories of Jalil Mammadguluzadeh, Jafar Jabbarly, and poems of Mirza Ali Mojuz.

The works of the artist were exhibited in Germany, Czechoslovakia, Italy, Iraq, Turkey and other countries. Currently, a number of the artist's works are exhibited in the National Art Museum of Azerbaijan, the National Museum of History of Azerbaijan and the Nizami Museum of Azerbaijani Literature.

Davud Kazimov worked as a professor at the Azerbaijan State Academy of Fine Arts and worked as a teacher at the painting faculty.

Davud Kazimov died on February 14, 2015, in Baku.

== Awards ==
- People's Artist of Azerbaijan — March 4, 1992
- Honored Artist of the Azerbaijan SSR — December 5, 1977

== See also ==
- List of Azerbaijani artists
