= Taghi Taghiyev =

Soviet Azerbaijani painter (1917–1993)

Taghi Taghiyev Tağı Tağıyev
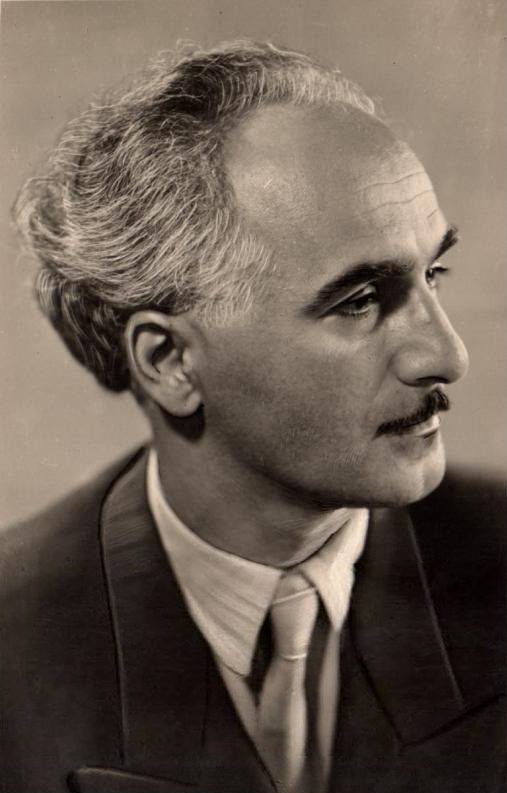
- Born: Tağı Əzizağa oğlu Tağıyev; 7 November 1917; Baku, Baku Governorate, Russian Empire
- Died: 27 June 1993 (aged 75); Baku, Azerbaijan
- Citizenship: USSR
- Occupation: Painter
- Awards: Honored Art Worker of the Azerbaijan SSR People's Artist of the Azerbaijan SSR Order of the Badge of Honour

Taghi Taghiyev (Azerbaijani: Tağı Əzizağa oğlu Tağıyev; 7 November 1917 – 27 June 1993) was an Azerbaijani painter. He was awarded the title of People's Artists of the Azerbaijan SSR.

== Early life and education ==
Taghi Taghiyev was born on 7 November 1917 in Baku, Russian Empire (now Azerbaijan). He studied at the Technical School of Art in Baku from 1931 until 1935. Later he studied at Surikov Moscow Art Institute from 1940 until 1941.

== Career ==
He authored thematic paintings of still life, portraits, landscapes, and home scenes. Taghiyev is more famous as a portraitist. He also created realist painting in Azerbaijan. The main themes in his works are the history and historical personalities, laborers, and the nature.

Taghiyev traveled to many countries, including Turkey, Greece, Italy, Spain, France and created many paintings about his life. His first exhibition in Baku was held in 1962. "Childhood Memories", "Absheron Series" and the other famous paintings of the artist were demonstrated in Prague, Pekin, Dakar, Baghdad and other cities. "Gara Garayev", "Sattar Bahlulzade", "Bahruz Kangarli" (1947), "Kamil Khanlarov", "Soltan Mahammad", "Maral Rahmanzadeh" are the most known works of Taghi Taghiyev. He went on a trip to countries of Europe and Africa in 1954 and created many paintings of his impressions as "African Girl", "Hello, New World".

Taghiyev's paintings are displayed in State Museum of Oriental Art (Moscow), National Art Museum of Azerbaijan named after Rustam Mustafayev, Azerbaijan State Art Gallery and other museums. He was awarded the title of Honorary Artist and People's Artist of the Azerbaijan SSR (on 1 December 1982).

== Death and legacy ==
The painter died on 27 June 1993 in Baku, Azerbaijan SSR.

On 29 March 2013 an "Anniversary Exhibition" was held, and on 8 June 2018 the "100th Anniversary Exhibition" was held; both were at the National Art Museum of Azerbaijan.

== See also ==
- List of Azerbaijani artists
