= Rauf Adigozalov =

Azerbaijani singer (1940–2002)

- Born: Rauf Zulfugar oglu Adigozalov; February 8, 1940; Baku, Azerbaijan
- Origin: Baku, Azerbaijan
- Died: June 29, 2002 (aged 61) Baku, Azerbaijan

Rauf Zulfugar oglu Adigozalov (Azerbaijani: Rauf Zülfüqar oğlu Adıgözəlov; 8 February 1940 – 29 June 2002) was an Azerbaijani violinist and singer. He was the son of the singer Zulfugar Adigozalov, and the brother of the composer Vasif Adigozalov. He graduated from Moscow Conservatory (1965), and after graduation returned to Azerbaijan. He played in the symphonic orchestra of the Azerbaijan SSR and was a concertmaster. In 1974, he taught in Azerbaijan State Conservatory at cathedra of chamber ensemble. In 1992, he became an associate professor, and in 1997, a professor.

In 1970, he performed as a singer and quite often combined vocal and instrumental numbers in one concert. Azerbaijani music, including Asker's aria from "Arshin mal alan" musical comedy of Uzeyir Hajibeyov took an important place in the vocal repertoire of Adigozalov.

Rauf Adigozalov was Honored Art Worker of Azerbaijan (1992).
