= Zulfu Adigozalov =

Azerbaijani singer

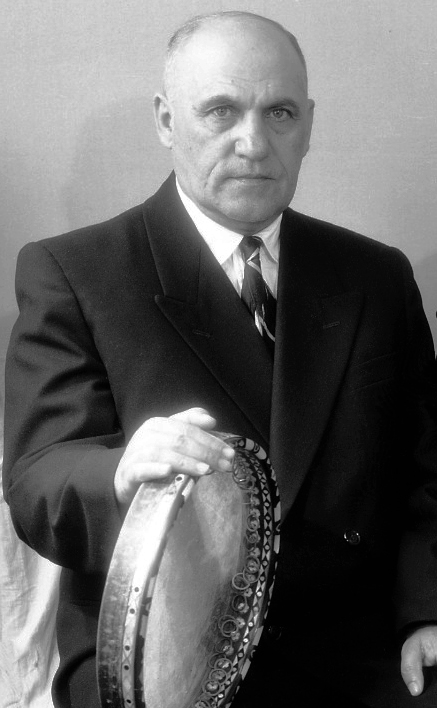
- Born: 1898; Garadolag, near Shusha, Elizavetpol Governorate, Russian Empire
- Died: 1963 (aged 64–65); Baku, Azerbaijan SSR, Soviet Union
- Occupations: Khananda, folk singer
- Known for: Azerbaijani mugham
- Children: Vasif Adigozalov, Rauf Adigozalov
- Relatives: Yalchin Adigozalov (grandson)
- Awards: Honorary Artist of Azerbaijan (1943)

Zulfugar "Zulfu" Samad oglu Adigozalov (Azerbaijani: Zülfü Adıgözəlov) (1898, near Shusha – 1963, Baku) was a Soviet ethnic Azerbaijani and khananda folk singer. He was the father of composer Vasif Adigozalov, violinist Rauf Adigozalov, and the grandfather of conductor Yalchin Adigozalov.

== Career ==
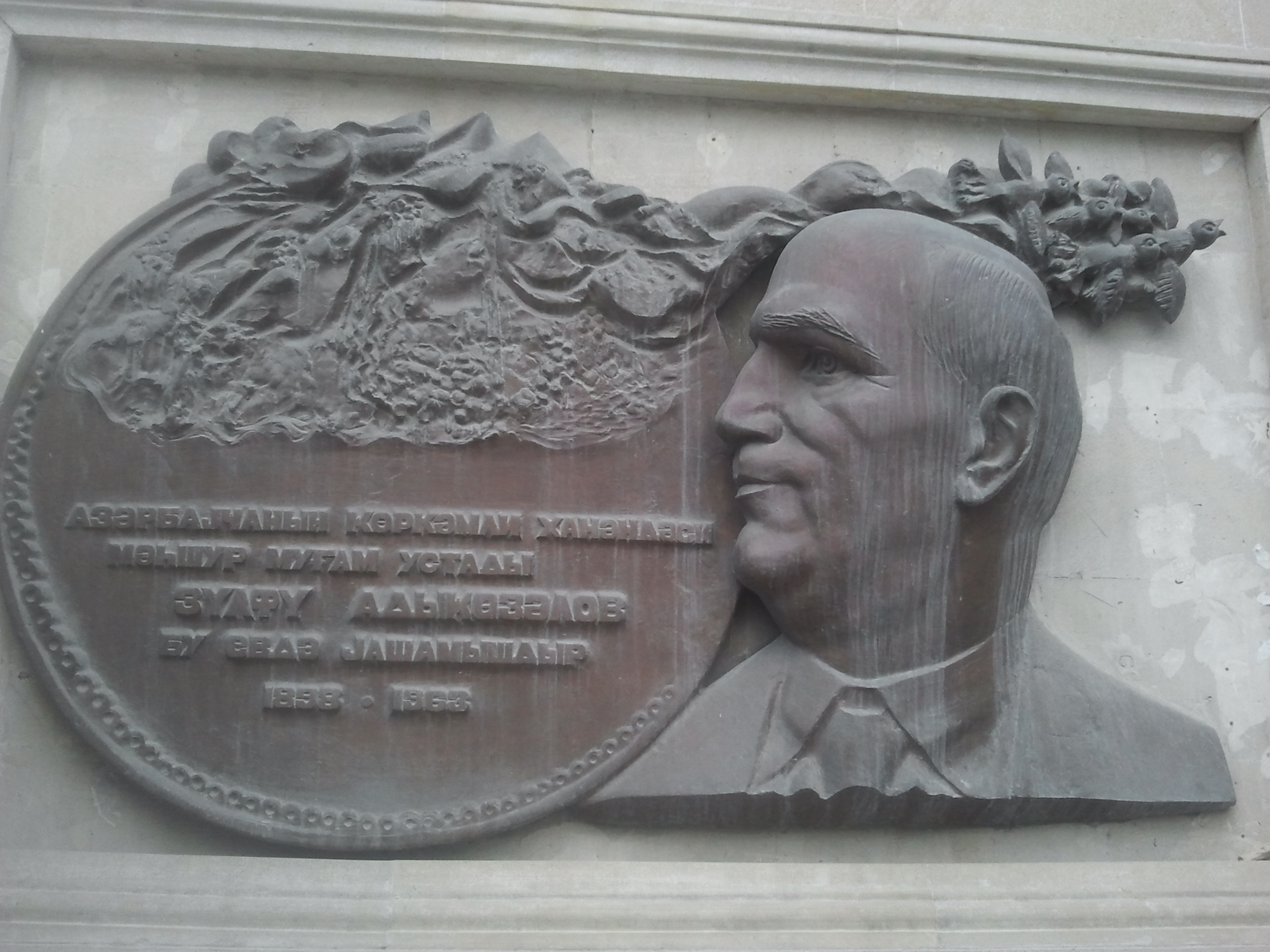
Plaque on building where Azerbaijani mugham singer Zulfu Adigozalov lived in Baku

Zulfu Adigozalov was born into a family of a semi-nomadic cattle-breeder in the village of Garadolag, near present-day Agjabadi. He started singing as an amateur at a young age, but was later trained professionally by the renowned folk singer Musa Shushinski and sazanda Tatevos Harutyunov, specializing in the Rast variety of mugham. In the mid-1920s he moved to Ganja where he started his professional career. In 1927 Adigozalov settled in the capital city of Baku to work as a soloist with the Azerbaijan State Philharmonic Society. In 1929–1932 he performed at the Azerbaijan State Opera Theatre. During the German-Soviet War Zulfu Adigozalov along with other Azerbaijani artists gave concerts for soldiers on frontlines. In 1943 he was recognized as an Honorary Artist of Azerbaijan.
