= Elza Ibrahimova =

Azerbaijani composer

Elza İbrahimova Elza İmaməddin qızı İbrahimova
- Born: 10 January 1938; Hajigabul, Azerbaijan SSR, USSR
- Died: 11 February 2012 (aged 74) Baku, Azerbaijan
- Occupation: Composer

Elza Imameddin qizi Ibrahimova (Azerbaijani: Elza İmaməddin qızı İbrahimova, Russian: Эльза Имамеддин кызы Ибрагимова, 10 January 1938, Hajigabul, Azerbaijan SSR, USSR – 11 February 2012, Baku, Azerbaijan) was an Azerbaijani composer, People's Artist of the Republic of Azerbaijan (2008), and People's Artist of Dagestan.

== Early life ==
Elza Ibrahimova was born on 10 January 1938 in Hajiqabul, Azerbaijan SSR. She graduated from Music School No. 8 in Baku, the Composition Class of A. Zeynalli High Music School in 1957, and the Composition Department of Azerbaijan State Conservatoire (current Baku Academy of Music) named after U. Hajibeyov in 1964.

== Career ==
Ibrahimova composed her first song in 1969. Shovkat Alakbarova was the first performer of her song called "Yalan ha deyil" composed to Mammad Rahim's poem. Ibrahimova was one of the composers who brought tango rhythm into variety art. Her song "Qurban verərdim" composed to Rafig Zeka's poem was not accepted by the Artistic Council in the Soviet era. She was told that tango's bourgeois harmony did not match the Soviet spirit. But afterward along with "Qurban verərdim", " Sən mənə lazimsan" (poem by Aliagha Kurchayli), "Bağçadan keçmisən" (poem by A.Alibeyli) and other songs that adopted tango rhythm were added the composer's favorite songs’ list.

She was not satisfied with only variety art. She also authored the three-part concert for fortepiano and orchestra which she wrote for her diploma, Afət", "Şeyx Şamil" and "Yanan laylalar" operas, as well the anthem dedicated to oil workers on the occasion of the 130-year anniversary of the Azerbaijani oil industry.

She also composed romances, Sonatas and Quartets. The composer's works "Ey vətən" (sung by Rashid Behbudov) described Azerbaijan all over the world. She wrote music to the hundreds of poems of Azerbaijan poets and tens of poetic examples in Russian.

She died at 74 on 11 February 2012 after a long-term illness. Ibrahimova was buried in the Second Alley of Honor in Baku.

== Major works ==
- "Afət" opera (author of the works: Huseyn Javid)
- "Yanan laylalar" opera (libretto – Ramiz Heydar, 1992)
- Poem by Z. Ziyadoglu: "Oilworkers" anthem for soloist and orchestra
- Music to the film “Dunya sevənlərindir” (1998)
- Songs and romances to the poems of R. Heydar, B.Vahabzade, O. Gochulu, V.Aziz, V.Samedoglu, R.Afandiyeva and others
- "Requiem" dedicated to Michael Jackson’s memory, 2009
- "Gecələr bulaq başi" on B.Vahabzade's poetry

== Filmography ==
- “Nəğməkar torpaq” (Land of Song) (film, 1981)
- “Bağişla” (Forgive me) (film, 1983)
- “Qayıdış” (Return) (film, 1992)
- “Yalçın” (film, 2004)
- “Sən yadima düşəndə.. “ (When I remember you)(film, 2013)

== Honours and awards ==
- Honored Art Figure of the Republic of Azerbaijan in 1992.
- People's Artist of the Republic of Azerbaijan in 2008.
- Decree celebrating Elza Ibrahimova's 80th birthday.

== See also ==
- List of People's Artists of the Azerbaijan SSR
