= Heydar Aliyev Prize =

The Heydar Aliyev Prize was created by Decree #38 of the President of Azerbaijan, on March 10, 2004. The head of state approved the regulation of Prize on September 20, 2007.

== General provisions ==
It is stated in the regulation, which consists of 25 articles, that the Heydar Aliyev Prize is given to those who have special services in public-political, social, economic, scientific, and cultural spheres; special services in civil service; and who actively participate in social life in the development of friendship and cooperation of countries in international relations.

According to the regulation, the Heydar Aliyev Prize should be given every year on May 10 - on the birthday of Heydar Aliyev.

The prize can be given to citizens of Azerbaijan, as well as citizens of foreign countries and stateless people.

The prize is not given to a person for the second time.

== Award process ==
The Heydar Aliyev Prize consists of a diploma, prize, and golden badge with an image of Heydar Aliyev. The badge is made of gold. The diploma is compiled by the commission and signed by the President of the Republic of Azerbaijan. The amount of the prize is 50,000 AZN. The prize is given at the expense of the state budget with the presentation of the Award Commission based on the order of the president.

The members of the commission were determined on November 14, 2007, by the presidential decree. The chairman of the commission is Ilham Aliyev.

Candidates can be nominated for the prize by creative organizations, the President of Azerbaijan, the Prime Minister of the Republic, the Chairman of the National Assembly, the Chairman of the Constitutional Court of Azerbaijan, the President of the National Academy of Sciences of Azerbaijan every year till the end of October.

The list of nominees for the prize is published two months before the award ceremony.

The prize is presented in the ceremonial and public place by the President of the Republic of Azerbaijan. İt should be informed about the creativity, services, and activities of the candidate during the award ceremony.

== See also ==
- Heydar Aliyev Order
