= Humay Award =

Azerbaijani national award

Humay Award Humay Mükafatı
- Awarded for: achievements in the field of culture, art, music, sports, television, journalism, tourism, and science
- Country: Azerbaijan
- Formerly called: Humay National Award
- Established: 1993
- First award: March 1994
- Final award: May 4, 2019

Humay Award (Azerbaijani: Humay Mükafatı) was an Azerbaijani national achievement award, established in 1993 by the Baku International Cultural Society and was active until 2019.

== History ==
The first award ceremony was held at the Gulustan Palace in March 1994. For the first three years, a ceramic figurine was presented as an award made by artist Mezahir Avshar. Starting after the forth year, a bronze statuette was made by the artist Arif Gaziev.

For the first few years, the Humay Award was awarded in only a few categories, including in music, cinema, theatre, fine arts, and literature. Subsequently, new nominations were added, including television, architecture, journalism, sport, tourism, “best music video”, book publishing, science, dance, "the art of national mugham”, "the art of photography", and "the best project in the Azerbaijani Internet".

Music conductor Yalchin Adigezalov was the first awardee of "best conductor of the year" in 1993. Other early awardees in 1994 included actor Arif Ali Guliyev; actor Alakbar Huseynov; visual artist Farman Gulamov; and music composer Ismail Gadzhibekov.
