= People's Artist of Azerbaijan =

Honorary title

People's Artist of Azerbaijan Azərbaycan Respublikasının xalq rəssamı
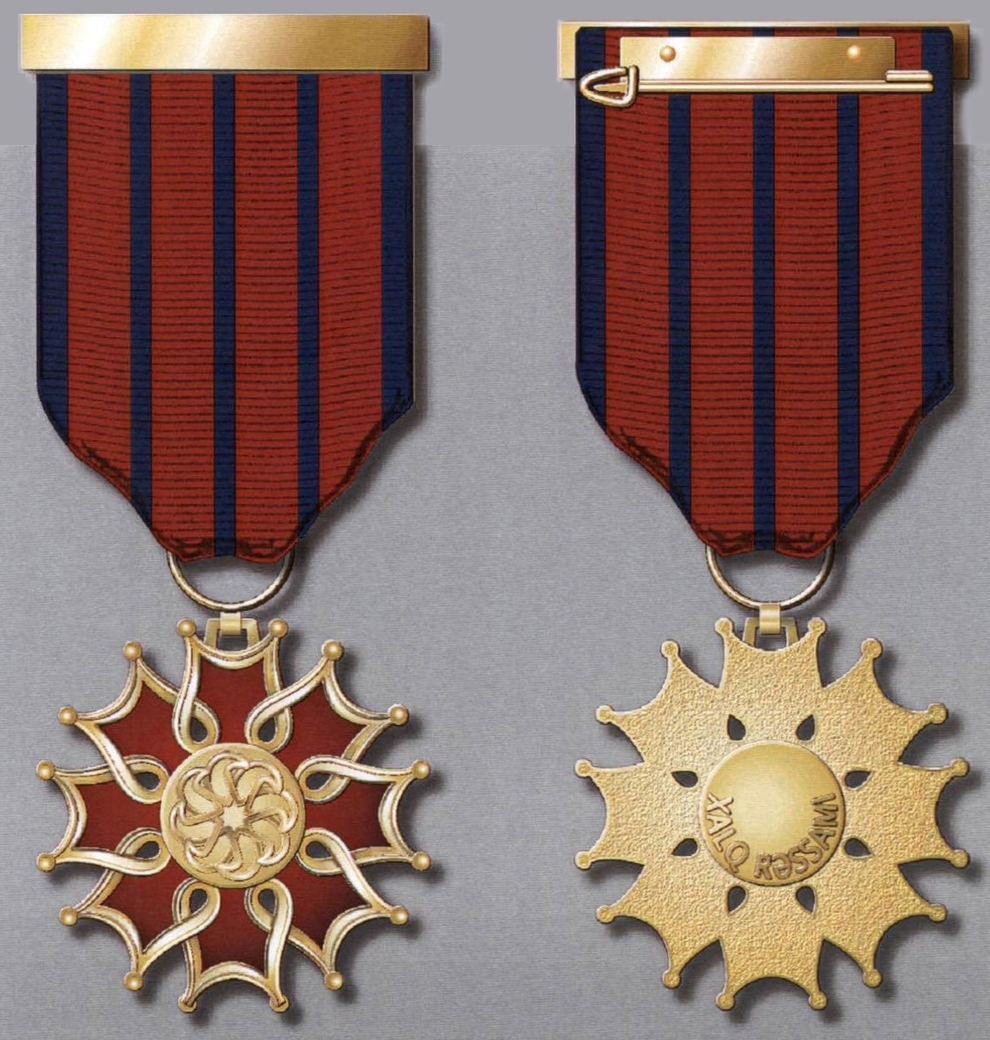
- Awarded for: Visual art, painting
- Date: 1990–present

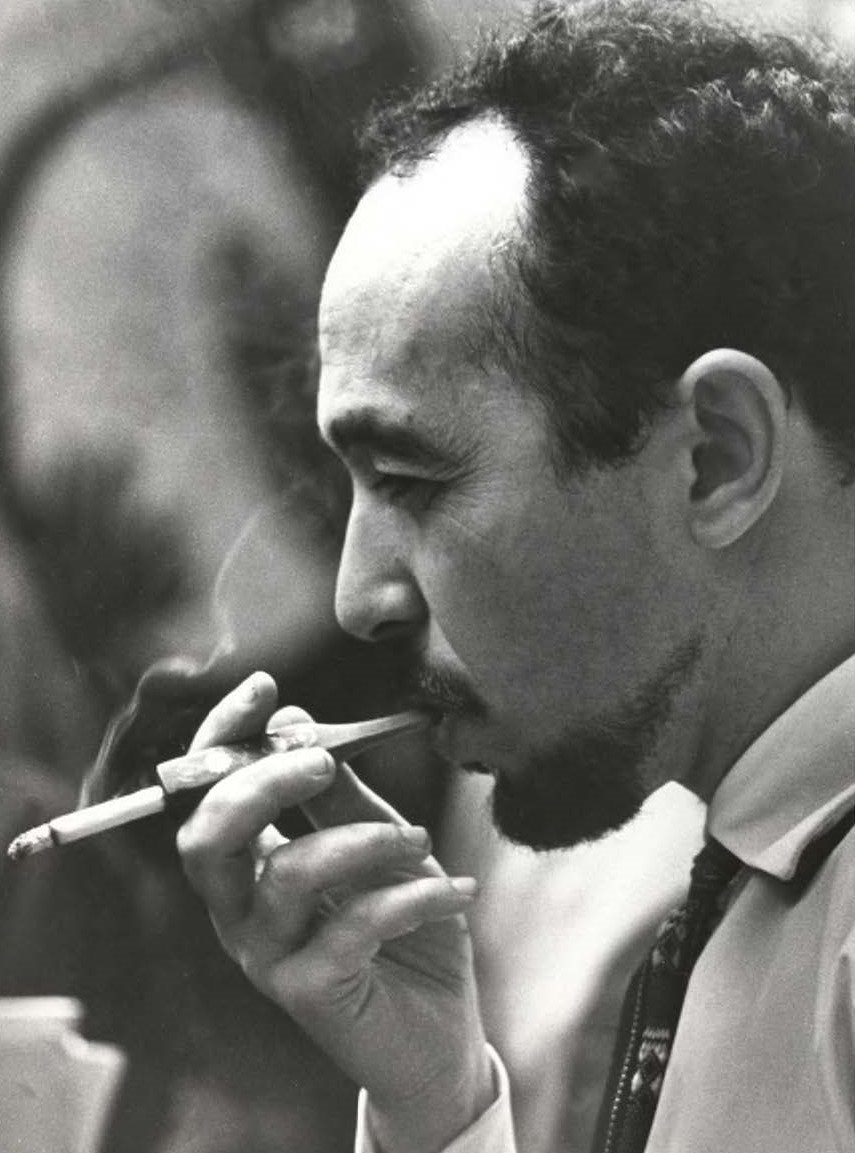
Togrul Narimanbekov, People's Artist of Azerbaijan (1967)

People's Artist of Azerbaijan (Azerbaijani: Azərbaycan Respublikasının xalq rəssamı) is the honorary title and award granted for contribution to the development of Azerbaijani culture in the fields of visual art and painting. The People's Artists of the Azerbaijan SSR (1944–1990) was a precursor award given during the time of the Azerbaijan Soviet Socialist Republic, Soviet Union.

== History ==
In May 22, 1998, the honorary title "People's Artist of Azerbaijan" was established by Decree of the President of the Republic of Azerbaijan, along with some other titles. The President of Azerbaijan confers the honorary title on his initiative, as well as on the proposal of the National Assembly and the Cabinet of Ministers. The title is awarded only to citizens of Azerbaijan. According to the decree, the honorary title of "People's Artist of Azerbaijan" cannot be awarded to the same person repeatedly. A person awarded an honorary title may be deprived of the title in cases of misconduct.

Persons awarded the honorary title "People's Artist of Azerbaijan" also receive a certificate and a badge of the honorary title of the Republic of Azerbaijan. The badge of honor is worn on the right side of the chest.

== People's Artists of Azerbaijan ==
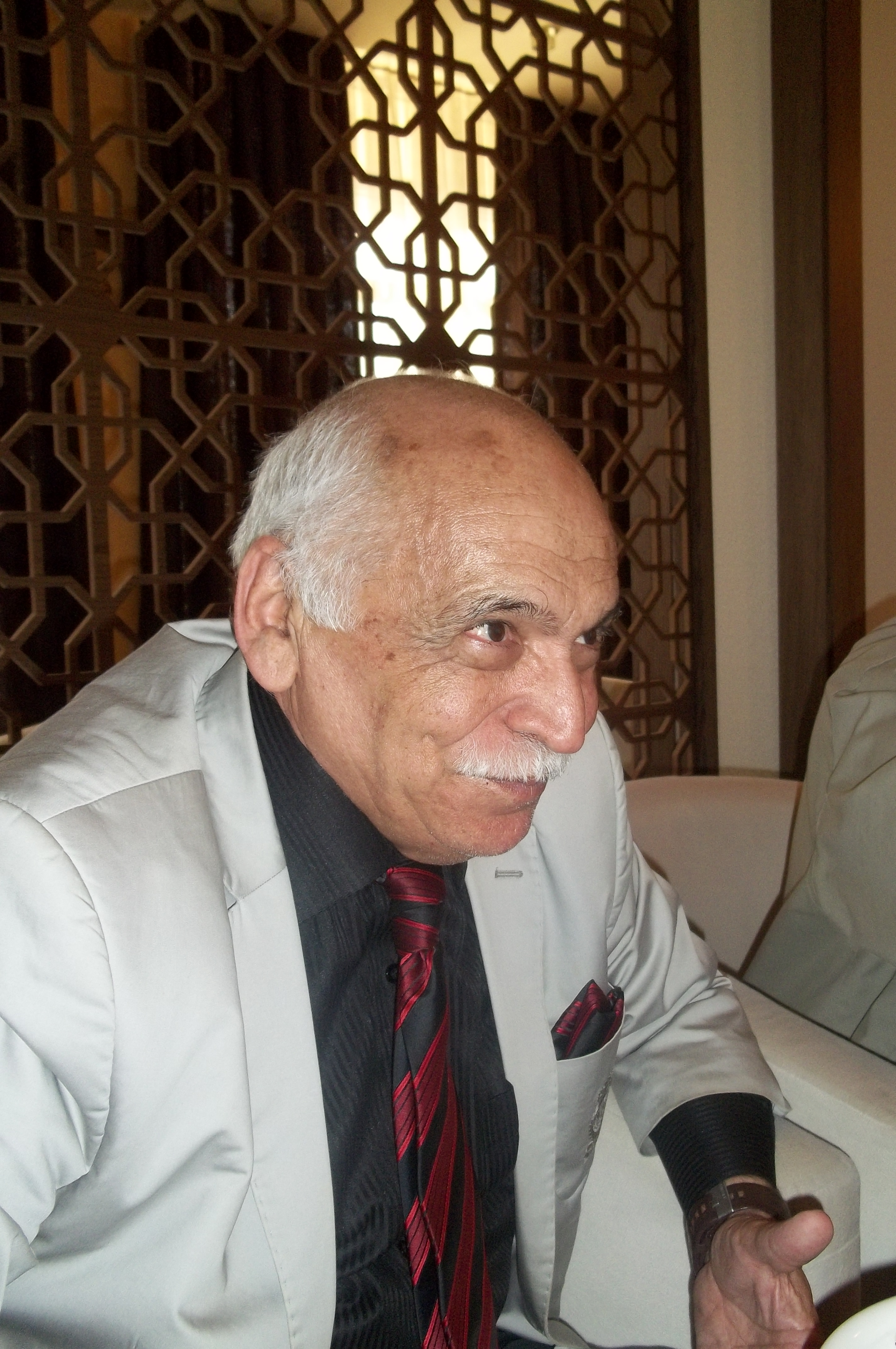
Arif Huseynov, painter and People's Artist of Azerbaijan (2006)

- Tofig Aghababayev
- Davud Kazimov (1992)
- Rafig Mehdiyev (1992)
- Gullu Mustafayeva
- Nazim Bekkishiev
- Eljan Shamilov
- Taghi Taghiyev
- Ogtay Shikhaliyev
- Khanlar Azmedov
- Ogtay Sadigzade (1992)
- Kamil Khanlarov (1992)
- Mais Agabekov
- Mammadaga Huseynov
- Rafiz Ismayilov
- Kamal Alekperov
- Altai Gadzhiev
- Farkhad Khalilov
- Arif Huseynov (2006)
- Agali Ibragimov
- Asaf Jafarov
- Fazil Najafov
- Salkhab Mammadov
- Mirnadir Zeynalov
- Fuad Salayev
- Eldar Mikayilzadeh (2018)
- Akif Askerov
- Arif Azizov
- Ashraf Geybatov
- Arif Gaziev (2018)
- Sakit Mammadov
- Sirus Mirzazadeh
- Altay Hajiyev (2002)
- Tahir Tahirov
- Aghaali Ibrahimov
- Gayyur Yunus

== See also ==
- List of People's Artists of the Azerbaijan SSR
- People's Artiste of Azerbaijan, generally for entertainers, singers
- People’s Artist
- Orders, decorations, and medals of Azerbaijan
