= Union of Artists of Azerbaijan =

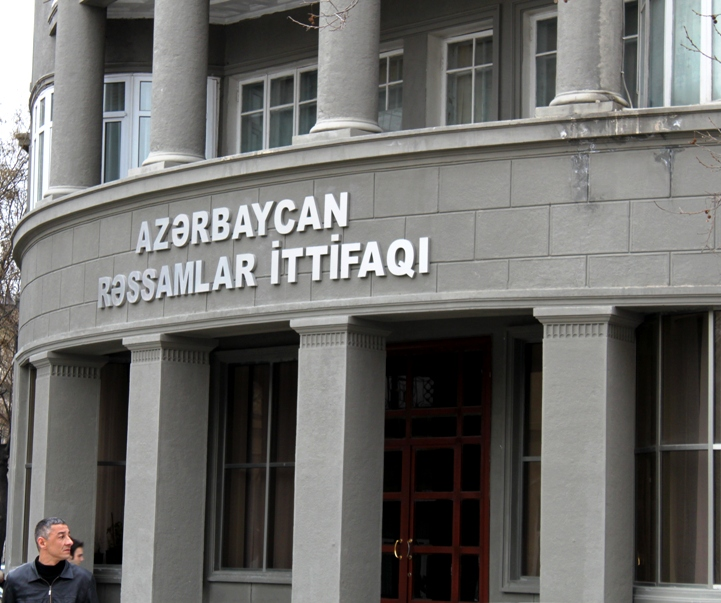
- Founded: 1932
- Location: Khagani street, Baku, Azerbaijan

Union of Artists of Azerbaijan - is a creative public organization, volunteer union of professional artists and art critics - creative people working in the territory of Azerbaijan.

== History ==
An organizational arrangement in the sphere of arts had begun in the republic, in 1920, which was ended with creation of Union of the Soviet Artists of Azerbaijan, in 1932. Union of Artists of Azerbaijan celebrated its 65th anniversary, in 2006. Opening of exposition dedicated to development of arts in the republic during the last decades was held for jubilee.

== Instituted prizes ==
A prize named after the artist-miniaturist of the 16th century, Soltan Muhammad was instituted by the Union of Artists of Azerbaijan and this premium is conferred once every two years to artists and art critics.
