= Monument to Nikola Tesla (Baku) =

- Azerbaijani: Nikola Teslanın heykəli
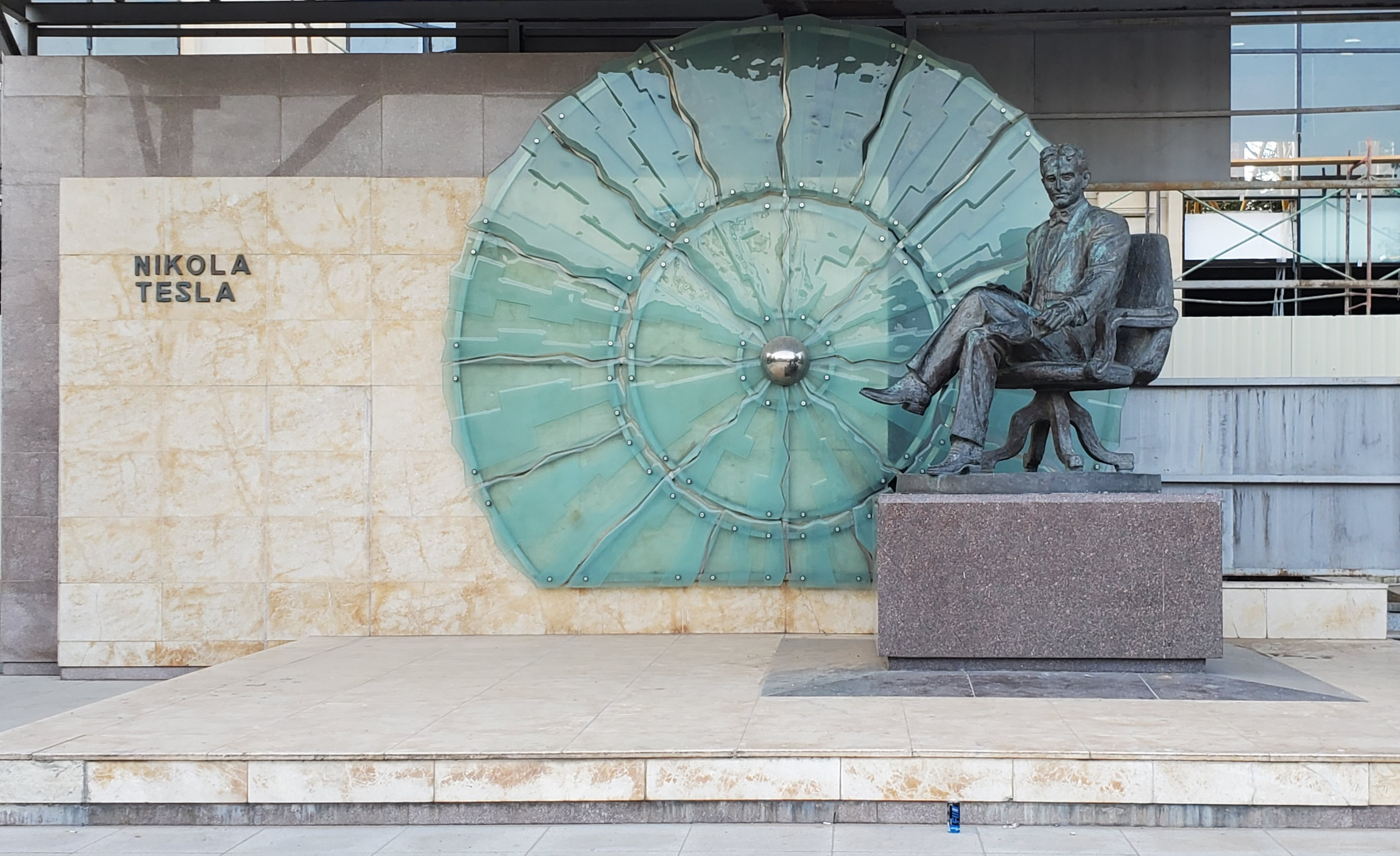
- Interactive map of Monument to Nikola Tesla
- Location: Baku, Azerbaijan
- Coordinates: 40°22′51″N 49°50′51″E
- Designer: Omar Eldarov
- Material: bronze
- Length: 3.3 m
- Opening date: 8 February 2013
- Dedicated to: Nikola Tesla

Monument to Nikola Tesla (Azerbaijani: Nikola Teslanın heykəli) is a monument to the Serbian-American scientist Nikola Tesla, located in the capital of Azerbaijan, Baku, in a park at the crossing of the Azadlig Avenue and the Suleiman Rahimov Street. The monument authors are the People's Artist of Azerbaijan, the sculptor Omar Eldarov and the architect Sanan Salamzade. The monument is cast from bronze. Its height together with the pedestal is 3.3 meters. The monument is set against the background of a decorative panel depicting one of Teslas main inventions - an alternator.

== Opening ceremony ==
The opening ceremony of the monument took place on 8 February 2013. The ceremony was attended by the President of Azerbaijan, Ilham Aliyev, the First Lady of Azerbaijan, Mehriban Aliyeva, the President of Serbia, Tomislav Nikolić, and the First Lady of Serbia, Dragica Nikolić. At the opening ceremony, the presidents delivered speeches.

== See also ==
- Aliagha Vahid Monument
- Mustafa Kemal Atatürk Monument, Baku
- Wolfgang Amadeus Mozart monument, Baku
