= Jafar Jabbarli Monument =

Coordinates: 40.4°N 49.8°E

- Azerbaijani: Cəfər Cabbarlının heykəli
- Location: Jafar Jabbarli square, Baku, Azerbaijan
- Designer: Miralasgar Mirgasimov
- Material: pink granite
- Length: 5.5 m
- Opening date: 1959-1982
- Dedicated to: Jafar Jabbarli

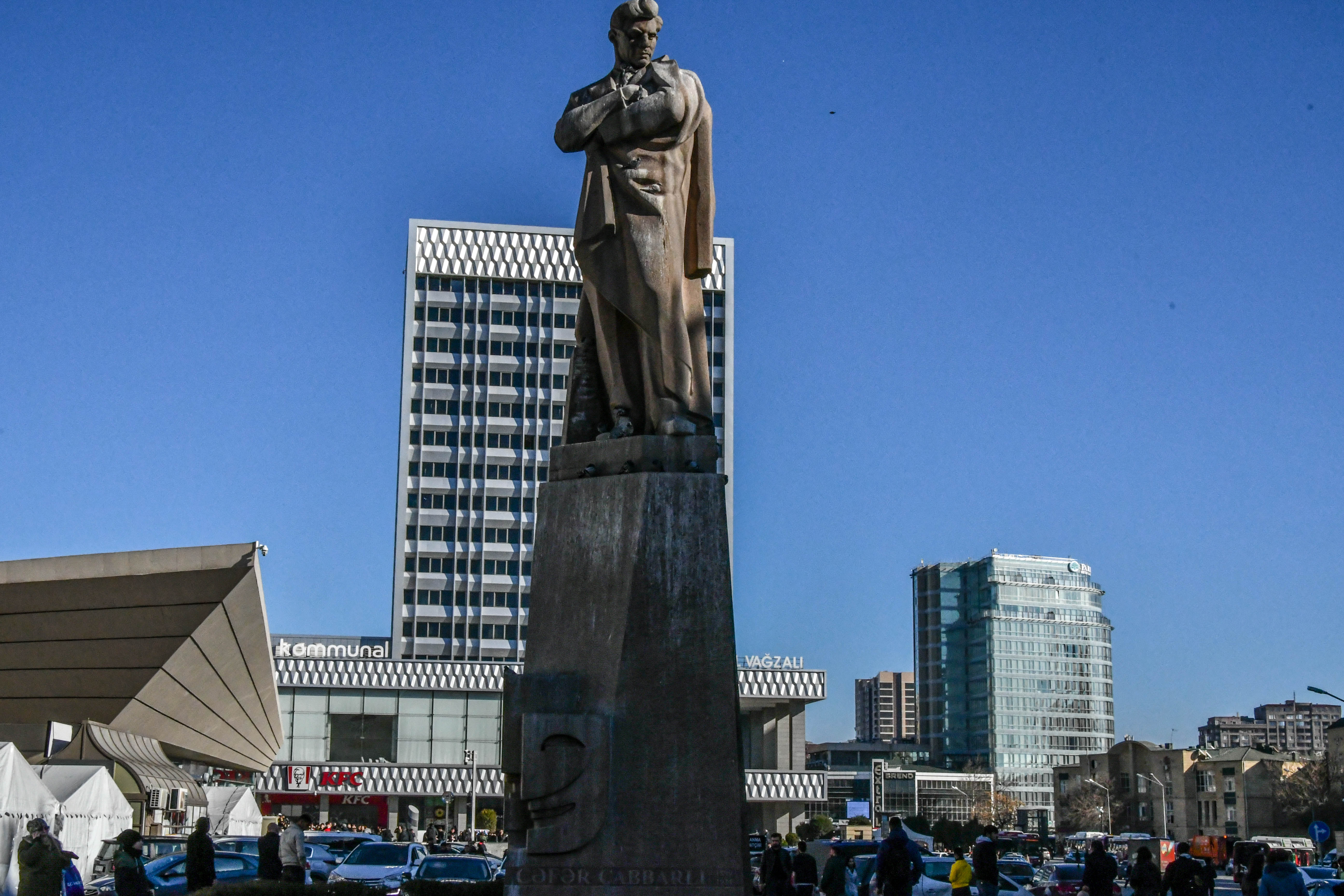
Jafar Jabbarli monument

Jafar Jabbarli Monument (Azerbaijani: Cəfər Cabbarlının heykəli) is a monument to the Azerbaijani poet and dramatist Jafar Jabbarli (1899–1934), located on Jafar Jabbarli Square in the capital of Azerbaijan, Baku, not far from the entrance to the 28 May metro station. The monument was made of pink granite by the sculptor Mir-Ali Mir-Gasimov. It was installed in 1982. The architect of the monument is Yusif Kadymov.

== Monument’s history ==
The decision to raise a monument to the dramatist on the square in front of the Baku railway station was made in 1959. In the same year, a stone was set on the site of the future monument, informing that a monument to Jafar Jabbarli would be placed there. A competition was announced for the best project, which was won by Mir-Ali Mir-Gasimov.

For the pedestals material, Mir-Ali Mir-Gasimov together with his wife Gultekin khanym went to Ukraine, to the Novo-Danilovsky quarry. Despite the fact that the sculptor had already begun the work, the striving style for minimalism, widespread during those years of Khrushchevs rule, and the fight against "excesses" suspended this work for a long time. In the late ’70s, they recalled about the monument, but the case again got frozen. Soon, the first secretary of the Central Committee of the Communist Party of Azerbaijan, Heydar Aliyev, intervened in the situation. He personally supervised the progress of the work, provided assistance and support to Mir-Gasimov, and back in 1979 he came to the sculptor's workshop and got acquainted with the sketches of the works, Aliyev liked those.

While working on the monument, Mir-Ali Mir-Gasimov was very worried and nervous, and when the work was almost finished, the sculptor had a massive heart attack right in the workshop. On Aliyev's instructions, the personal doctor of the first secretary took care of the artists health.

Soon, the work, which Mir-Kasimov considered one of the most important in his life, was completed. The monument was opened on 23 March 1982 by Heydar Aliyev himself, delivering a speech at the ceremony. This monument is considered one of the most famous works of the sculptor.

In the same year, in accordance with the decree of the Supreme Soviet of the Azerbaijan SSR of 1 December 1982, Mir-Gasimov was awarded the title of People's Artist of the Azerbaijan SSR.

The total height of the monument is 5.5 m, and the mass of the granite from which it is made is 280 tons.

In 2013, the monument underwent restoration, as a result of which the name and surname of Jafar Jabbarli, as well as the years of his birth and death, and the name and surname of the sculpture Mir-Ali Mir-Gasimov were engraved on the monument.

== See also ==
- Aliagha Vahid Monument
- Mustafa Kemal Atatürk Monument, Baku
- Wolfgang Amadeus Mozart monument, Baku
