= Gara Garayev Monument =

- Azerbaijani: Qara Qarayevin heykəli
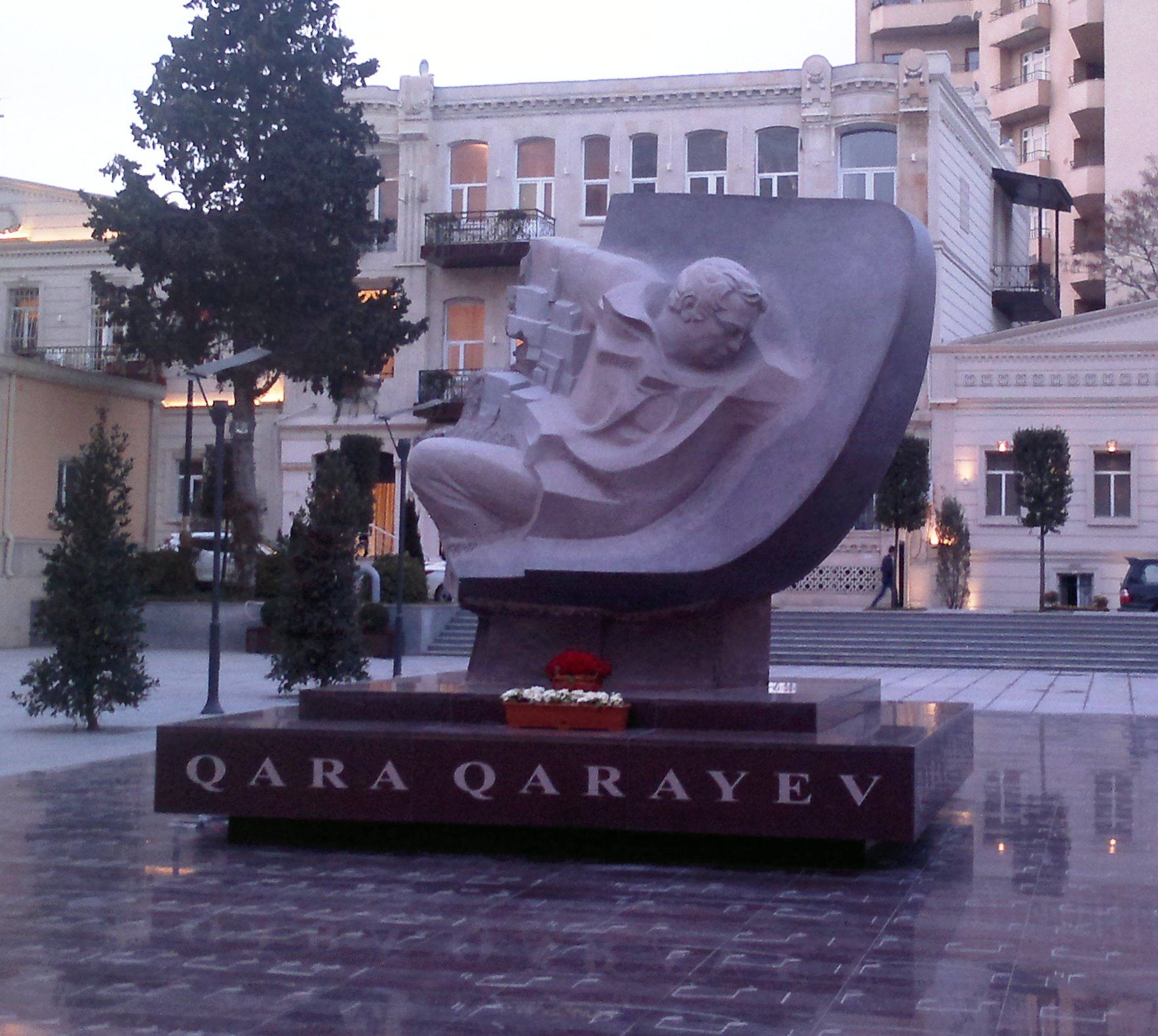
- Interactive map of Gara Garayev Monument
- Location: Baku, Azerbaijan
- Coordinates: 40°22′33″N 49°50′39″E
- Designer: Fazil Najafov
- Material: granite
- Length: 3.5 m
- Opening date: 2014
- Dedicated to: Gara Garayev

Gara Garayev Monument (Azerbaijani: Qara Qarayevin heykəli) – is a monument in Baku to the composer Gara Garayev (1918–1982).

== Description ==
The height of the monument is 3.5 meters. It is made of granite.

The monument is located behind the Nizami cinema, next to the Baku Music Academy and the residential building where the composer lived.

The monument's authors are the People's Artist of Azerbaijan, the sculptor Fazil Najafov and the Honoured Architect of Azerbaijan Rahim Seifullayev.

Before starting the work, Najafov studied the life and the work of Gara Garayev, according to the sculptor: “Garayev's music has filled my soul”. He understood that the statue should be complex, ambiguously perceived, carry something new, depicting non-conventional features...

Initially, they thought to create the sculpture quickly, the authors planned that the statue would be a seated or standing figure, but several versions were made, the work took three years.

The sculptor tried to embody in granite not only the personality of the composer, but also the essence of his art, music; the music that escaped from the stone, spreading into the air, falling on the slab of the square, taking the form of the waltz notes from the ballet "Seven Beauties" - this is what the carpet is decorated with. On the side, next to the composers feet, there is the old city, most likely Icherisheher, the back surface is designed in a different style. This is a large surface, treated with numerous plots, where the composers favourite heroes are depicted: Don Quixote fighting the mill in the upper right corner, Majnun, a captive of love in the lower pit, when he is capable of everything that separates the ashug-Masha in the centre, and a number of other figures.

— Efendizade Rena

== Unveiling ==
The unveiling ceremony of the monument to the composer Gara Garayev took place on 3 February 2014 with the participation of the President of Azerbaijan, Ilham Aliyev, the First Lady Mehriban Aliyeva, and the son of the composer Faraj Garayev.

== See also ==
- Aliagha Vahid Monument
- Jafar Jabbarli Monument
- Mustafa Kemal Atatürk Monument, Baku
