= Fazil Najafov =

Azerbaijani artist (1935–2023)

Fazil Najafov Fazil Nəcəfov
- Born: 16 February 1935; Baku, Azerbaijan SSR, Transcaucasian SFSR, USSR
- Died: 11 July 2023 (aged 88)
- Education: Surikov Moscow Art Institute
- Occupation(s): Sculptor, painter
- Notable work: Gara Garayev Monument
- Awards

Fazil Imamverdi oghlu Najafov (Azerbaijani: Fazil İmamverdi oğlu Nəcəfov, 16 February 1935 – 11 July 2023) was an Azerbaijani sculptor and painter. He was a People's Artist of Azerbaijan (2002) and one of the founders of the avant-garde style in Azerbaijani sculpture.

== Biography ==
Fazil Najafov was born in Baku in 1935. In 1955, he graduated from Azim Azimzade State Art School. He graduated from the Surikov Moscow Art Institute in 1961. The sculpture composition "Explanation" of the artist, who participated in exhibitions since the 1960s, and later the work "Oilman" attracted the public's attention.

In 2014, Najafov created a monument to the composer Gara Garayev, which was installed in the center of Baku.

Currently, the works of Fazil Najafov form a significant part of the collection of Baku Museum of Modern Art. In January 2019, the presentation of the documentary film "Stones looking at the sky" dedicated to the work of Fazil Najafov was held.

Najafov died on 11 July 2023, at the age of 88.

== Awards ==
- Honored Art Worker of the Azerbaijan SSR — 7 May 1988
- People's Artist of Azerbaijan — 30 May 2002
- Shohrat Order — 15 February 2020
