= Miralasgar Mirgasimov =

Azerbaijani sculptor (1924–2003)

Miralasgar Mirgasimov Mirələsgər Mirqasımov
- Born: February 9, 1924 (age 102); Baku, Azerbaijan SSR
- Died: November 9, 2003 (aged 79); Baku Azerbaijan
- Education: Azerbaijan Art School (1944); Repin Institute (1951)
- Notable work: Jafar Jabbarli Monument (Baku); Nariman Narimanov Monument (Sumgayit); Jalil Mammadguluzade Monument (Nakhchivan)
- Awards: People's Artist of the Azerbaijan SSR Honoured Art Worker of the Azerbaijan SSR Shohrat Order

Miralasgar Mirgasimov (Azerbaijani: Mirələsgər Mirqasımov; 9 February 1924 in Baku – 9 November 2003 in Baku) was an Azerbaijani and Soviet sculptor, member of the Union of Artists of Azerbaijan, professor, Honoured Art Worker of the Azerbaijan SSR, and People' Artist of the Azerbaijan SSR. He is the son of the first president of the Azerbaijan Academy of Sciences, Mirasadulla Mirgasimov.

Miralasgar is the first Azerbaijani sculptor who received a full specialized higher education. In 1944, he graduated with honours from the Azerbaijan Art School, and in 1951 - from the Repin Institute. He is the author of the monuments to Jafar Jabbarli (Baku), Nariman Narimanov (Sumgayit), Jalil Mammadguluzade (Nakhchivan). Some of Mirgasimovs works, such as the "Portrait of an Oilman", the "Portrait of a Girl", the"Girl with a Dove", are exhibited at the National Art Museum of Azerbaijan in Baku.

He participated in world exhibitions, including the 1967 World Exhibition in Montreal. Mirgasimovs works were also exhibited in Russia, Poland, Bulgaria, Germany, Egypt, and other countries. He was awarded with various orders and medals, including the Shohrat Order of the Republic of Azerbaijan.

== Biography ==
=== Childhood and youth ===
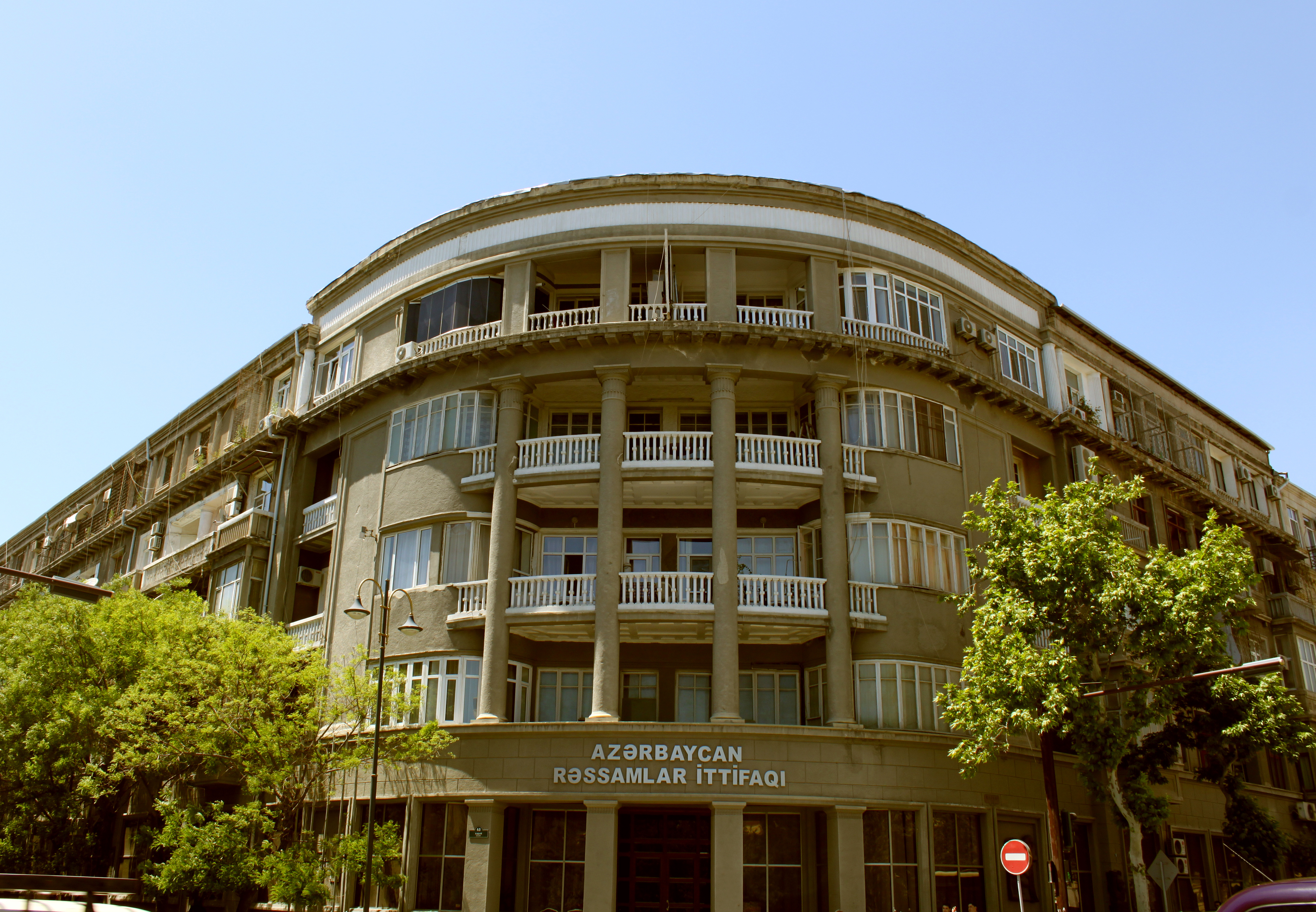
The house in Baku where Mirgasimov spent his childhood.

Miralasgar Mirgasimov was born on 9 February 1924 in Baku in the family of the doctor Mirasadulla Mirgasimov and his wife Jeyran khanim. The family had four more children. Miralasgar was the second child. Since childhood, everyone called him Alik. When Miralasgar was six years old, he experienced an epidemic cerebrospinal meningitis. Later he recovered, but soon, as a result of the atrophy of the auditory nerve, the little Miralasgar completely lost his hearing ability.

It was impossible to return the child's hearing at that time. Miralasgar's father, Mirasadulla Mirgasimov, also understood this. Despite the risk of the speech loss, thanks to his mother, who constantly communicated with her son and, using a special method she had invented, she has taught her son the alphabet, abandoning the ABC book for the deaf and dumb, consequently Miralasgar did not become dumb, therefore Miralasgar was not sent to a special school for the deaf. Soon Miralasgar learned to read, and his mother continued his education according to the method of teaching literacy and reading by the lips and the face expression of the speaker proposed by the Moscow speech therapist Natalya Rau. Miralasgar has mastered this technique well.

Miralasgar's mother, later in her book "The notes of a Mother", which she dedicated to her son, wrote about him:

His feelings and perception are honed to subtlety. He very boldly navigates in any environment having some kind of a special and inherent sense, a skill to quickly catch and understand everything. The kindness, the genuine love and the attraction to everything living and beautiful in the most natural way capture his nature. He never loses his peace of mind, he accepts the everyday troubles firmly. He always does what he thinks, even if it affects his peace.

=== Studying sculpture ===
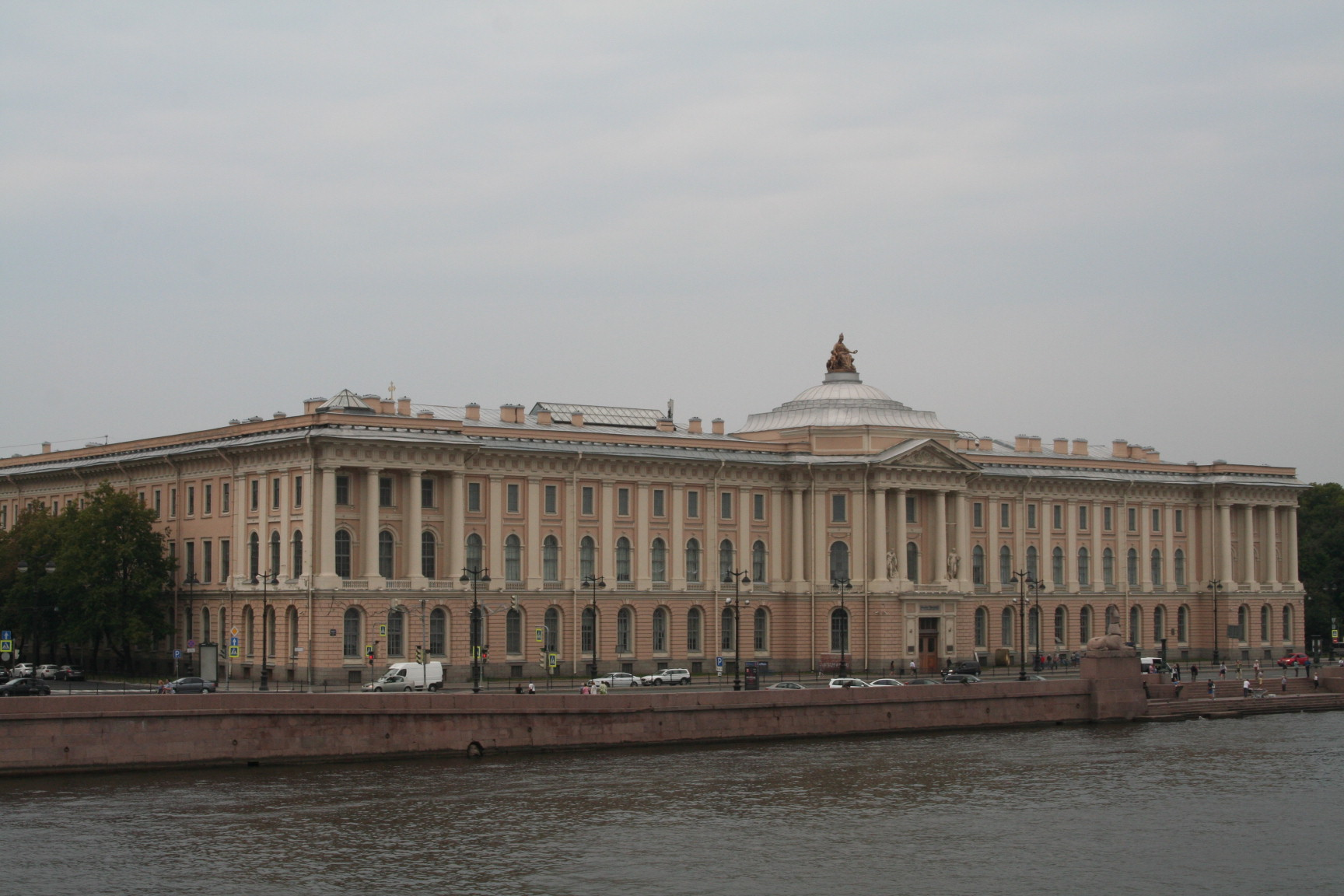
Repin Institute that Mirgasimov graduated from in 1951 (the building nowadays).

As a child, Miralasgar dreamed of becoming a pilot, and then - an agronomist or biologist. The boy also loved to draw and spent hours sculpting or painting. Once his mother addressed to the prominent sculptor Pinhos Sabsai, with whom the Mirgasimov family were neighbours. Under Sabsai's guidance, Miralasgar created, by memory, from clay, a sculpture of a lion seen in a menagerie, and afterward a human figurine. It was a sculpture of Quentin Dorward, the hero of the novel of the same name by Walter Scott, which Miralasgar had read and was inspired by. Seeing the sculpture, Sabsai told the parents: “Your son is undoubtedly gifted”. Miralasgar Mirgasimov was also tested by M.Gerasimov. Soon, special classes began with the boy at the Azerbaijan Art School.

In 1944, Miralasgar Mirgasimov graduated with honours from the Azerbaijan Art School. At this time, the World War II was still going on. Nevertheless, Miralasgar decided to go to the post-blockade Leningrad and enter the Repin Institute. In one of his letters sent home, Miralasgar writes:

Mother, I work a lot as the program is very intense. Soon we will make a plaster cast - a figure. It's so cold here that there can be no nudity. In some workshops, the temperature is kept at zero degrees...

In another letter to his mother, Mirgasimov wrote that at that time he had the highest marks at the sculpture department. So, only two, according to him, including himself, received an "excellent" for a sculpture, and that only one received an "excellent" for a drawing – this was himself.

Mirgasimov's thesis was dedicated to the "heroes-oilmen", and he successfully defended it. Thus, Miralasgar Mirgasimov became the first Azerbaijani sculptor who received a full specialized higher education.

=== Further life and work ===
In 1951, he graduated from the institute and together with S. Guliyev created a monument to V. I. Lenin for the city of Khankendi. Mirgasimov worked a lot in Baku. One of his sculptural works entitled "The portrait of a Girl", carved in marble, was especially popular. Before Mirgasimov, none of the Azerbaijani sculptors worked with stone. Taking part with this work in the frame of the republican and Transcaucasian exhibitions, Mirgasimov also presented this sculpture at the all-Union exhibition, and then at the 5th World Youth Festival in Warsaw, becoming the first Azerbaijani sculptor to win an international competition.

Later, Mirgasimov made other female sculptural portraits in marble: "Nana" and the "Girl with a Dove". His work the "Portrait of an Oilman" made of bronze was firstly exhibited in the opening hall of the 1961 World Art Exhibition, then, along with other works of the sculptor, it was exhibited at the 1967 World Exhibition in Montreal (Mirgasimov considered this sculpture his most successful work, since it was not made by an ordered). Today this work, as well as his "Portrait of a Girl", "Girl with a Dove", and "Naila" are exhibited at the National Art Museum of Azerbaijan in Baku. Also, the works of Mirgasimov were exhibited in Russia, Bulgaria, Germany, Egypt, and other countries.

Also, Miralasgar Mirgasimov became the author of a bronze bust of the second Hero of the Socialist Labor - Basti Bagirova, which was installed in her homeland, the Goranboy region, a portrait of his father, the academician Mirasadulla Mirgasimov, a half-figure of Nariman Narimanov in Sumgayit, a portrait of his mother, etc. In Nakhchivan, a monument to Jalil Mammadguluzade by Mirgasimov (created in 1959, installed in 1974) was raised.

The People's Artist of Azerbaijan, Togrul Narimanbeyov, wrote about the work of the sculptor:

The creativity of Miralasgar Mirgasimov is characterized by a high romance, a poetic vision of the world, an inexhaustible optimism, admiration for the man’s beauty, and by his rich spiritual world.

A great place in the images created by Mirgasimov was occupied by the theme of the inherent struggle in such works where the sculptor portrayed Bahram in the combat with an angry leopard, the African breaking the chains of the slavery, and Icarus (the conqueror of the air) on take-off. The images of a lion, a walrus, a horse tearing apart, a gazelle are the examples of the artist's animalistic sculptures.

In 1963 Mirgasimov was awarded the title of the Honoured Art Worker of the Azerbaijan SSR.

=== The image of Icarus in the creation of Mirgasimov ===
To create the image of Icarus at the time of take-off, Mirgasimov was inspired by the flight of the first man into space. Miralasgar Mirgasimov was the first among the sculptors to respond to this event. The sculpture is made of silvery aluminium. It was planned to be installed in front of the building of Baku airport; however, the idea never came to realization. Subsequently, Mirgasimov several times turned to the image of Icarus. Thus, the tombstone of the Head of the Civil Aviation Department of Azerbaijan, Nureddin Aliyev, authored by Mirgasimov, consists of a sculptural portrait of Aliyev and a bronze figure of Icarus, who, having lost a wing, falls, fixing his gaze and one hand to the sky.

=== Monument to Jafar Jabbarli ===
In 1982, a monument to the prominent Azerbaijani poet and playwright Jafar Jabbarli, made of pink granite by Mirgasimov, was raised in Baku. For the pedestal, Mirgasimov, together with his wife Gultekin Khanym, travelled to Ukraine, to the Novo-Danilovsky quarry.

The decision to establish the monument to the playwright on the square in front of the Baku railway station was made in 1959. In the same year, a stone was placed on the site of the future monument announcing that a monument to Jafar Jabbarli would be raised there. A competition was announced for the best project, which was won by Miralasgar Mirgasimov.

Despite the fact that the sculptor had already begun the work, the strive for minimalism, widespread during those years of Khrushchev's rule, and the fight against "excesses", suspended the process for a long time. In the late 70s, they remembered about the monument again, but the case was again frozen. Soon the first secretary of the Central Committee of the Communist Party of Azerbaijan, Heydar Aliyev, intervened in the situation. He personally supervised the progress of the work, provided Mirgasimov with help and support, and back in 1979 he came to the sculptor's workshop and got acquainted with the sketches of the works, consequently Aliyev liked those.

While working on the monument, Miralasgar Mirgasimov was very worried and nervous, and when the work was almost finished, the sculptor had a massive heart attack right in the workshop. At the disposition of Heydar Aliyev, the personal doctor of the first secretary was in charge of the artist's health.

Soon, the work, which Mirgasimov considered one of the most important in his life, was completed. The monument was opened on 23 March 1982 by Heydar Aliyev himself, who also made a speech at the ceremony. This monument is considered one of the most famous works of the sculptor.

In the same year, in accordance with the decree of the Supreme Soviet of the Azerbaijan SSR dated with 1 December, Mirgasimov was awarded the title of People's Artist of the Azerbaijan SSR.

=== The last years of life ===
In 1994, Miralasgar Mirgasimov had a severe stroke and was paralyzed, but soon recovered. Even then, it was difficult for him to work. The sculptor's eyesight deteriorated, speech was difficult, his hands did not obey. Despite this, Mirgasimov continued to create.

Miralasgar Mirgasimov was awarded various orders and medals, as well as the Order of Glory of the Republic of Azerbaijan.

The artist's dream was to create the image of Koroglu and the sculpture of the sea.

The last decades of his life, Miralasgar Mirgasimov spent together with his family in a house located on Nariman Narimanov Avenue in Baku. The sculptor died on 9 November 2003.
