= Farzaliyev =

Farzaliyev (Azerbaijani: Fərzəliyev, Russian: Фарзалиев) is an Azerbaijani surname. Notable people with the surname include:

- Chingiz Farzaliyev (born 1943), Azerbaijani artist and professor
- Firdovsi Farzaliyev (born 1993), Azerbaijani karateka
- Mashadi Mammad Farzaliyev (1872–1962), Azerbaijani folk singer
- Rizvan Farzaliyev (born 1979), Azerbaijani futsal player
