= Elmira Hüseynova =

Azerbaijani sculptor (1933–1995)

- Born: Elmira Hüseynova qızı Mehralı; 12 February 1933; Baku, Azerbaijan Soviet Socialist Republic
- Died: 23 January 1995 (aged 61); Baku, Azerbaijan
- Other names: (Russian: Эльмира Мехралы кызы Гусейнова)
- Occupation: sculptor
- Years active: 1957–1995
- Known for: monumental sculptures

Elmira Hüseynova (12 February 1933 – 23 January 1995) was an Azerbaijani sculptor and portrait painter, who has exhibits in various locations throughout the world and was honored as an Honored Artist of Azerbaijan.

== Early life ==
Elmira Hüseynova qızı Mehralı (Elmira Hüseynova, daughter of Mehralı) was born on 12 February 1933 in Baku, Azerbaijan Soviet Socialist Republic. From an early age, she wanted to become an artist. She attended the Azim Azimzade State Art College, graduating in 1954. She went on to further her education at the Ilya Repin St. Petersburg State Academic Institute for Painting, Sculpture and Architecture, graduating in 1960.

== Career ==
Hüseynova began exhibiting works in 1957, in both Azerbaijan and in various republics of the USSR, which mainly focused on cultural icons—literary figures, scientists, war heroes and ordinary working people. For sculpture, she worked in a variety of media including bronze, ceramics, epoxy resin, marble, plaster, stone, and wood. She worked with different types of woods and materials to produce the most appealing images of her subjects. She married Togrul Narimanbekov and the couple had a daughter, Asmar Narimanbekov, who was named after her mother's brother and would become an Honored Artist of Azerbaijan, as well.

Hüseynova is most noted for her massive sculpture works on monuments and her originality of composition. Some of her most noted pieces include The Farm Collective Girl (1957), Worker (1958), Family (1960), and Mother (1970). She created sculptures for the tombs of Jafar Jabbarly (1968) and Rasul Rza (1970), as well as a bas-relief of Lev Landau and a monument to Hasan bey Zardabi (1983), which stands in Icheri Sheher at the entrance to the publishing house of the Azerbaijan Encyclopedia. She created two monuments in Germany and in 1967 was recognized as an Honored Artist of Azerbaijan. Other noted works include a statue of Dmitri Mendeleev on the loggia of the National Library of Azerbaijan in Baku, a monument to Jafar Jabbar in Sumgayit (1966) and a painting on canvas in the Milli Mejlis building featuring a portrait of Nizami Ganjavi. In addition to her sculpture, she was known for portraiture, with her most-known pieces being: Portrait of Sattar Bahlulzade, Portrait of Rasul Rza, Portrait of a student, and Portrait of Tughril.

== Death and legacy ==
Hüseynova died on 23 January 1995 in Baku after a long illness. She has works in the permanent collections of the National Art Museum of Azerbaijan and the Azerbaijan State Art Galleries (az), as well as in private collections. In 2012, an exhibition of her works was held in her memory at the Baku Gallery.
