= Mirasadulla Mirgasimov =

- Mirəsədulla Mirqasımov
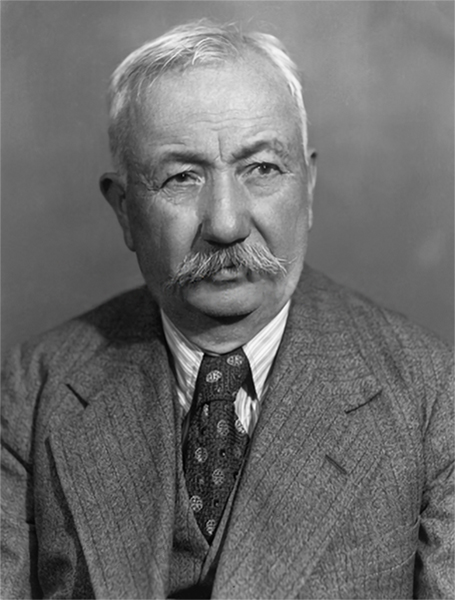
- Mirgasimov in 1950
- Born: 17 November 1883; Baku, Russian Empire
- Died: 20 July 1958 (aged 74); Baku, Azerbaijan SSR, Soviet Union
- Children: Miralasgar Mirgasimov; Ogtay Mirgasimov

Mirasadulla Miralasgar oglu Mirgasimov (Azerbaijani: Mir Əsədulla Mir Ələsgər oğlu Mirqasımov; 17 November 1883 – 20 July 1958) was an Azerbaijani and Soviet surgeon and scientist. He was one of the founders and the first president of Azerbaijan National Academy of Sciences (1945–1947).

== Biography ==
Mir Asadulla Mir Alesker oglu Mirkasimov was born in the city of Baku.

In 1913 he was enrolled in the Novorossiysk Medical School (Odesa I. I. Mechnikov National University).

In 1927 he became a doctor of medical science, in 1929 he was professor, and in 1945 he became the academician of the Azerbaijan SSR and was the first president (1945–1947). He was one of the founders of the Azerbaijan University of Medicine and Academy of Sciences.

He died in Baku, aged 74.

== Main scientific activity ==
During his 45-year medical and scientific-research activity, he published two monographs: “The Materials on the study of kidney stones in Azerbaijan”, “Surgery of typhoid fever” (in two volumes) and a textbook on general surgery in the Azerbaijani language, as well as more than 90 scientific articles.

== Family ==
He had two sons, one of them being Miralasgar Mirgasimov.

== Awards and honors ==
- Order of Lenin (1946)
- Two Orders of the Red Banner of Labour (1940, 1950)
- Order of the Red Star (1943)
- Medal "For the Defence of the Caucasus" (1946)
- Medal "For Valiant Labour in the Great Patriotic War 1941–1945"
- Medal "For the Victory over Germany in the Great Patriotic War 1941–1945"
