= Asmer Narimanbekova =

Artist from Azerbaijan

Asmer Narimanbekova (born 13 March 1961) is an artist from Azerbaijan. In 2002 she was awarded the title Honorary Artist of Azerbaijan.

== Biography ==
Narimanbekova was born in Baku. Her father Togrul Narimanbekov was an artist and her mother Elmira Guseynova, a sculptor.

From 1981 to 1986 she studied at the State Academy of Arts in Tbilisi, Georgia. In 2011 she was lecturing at the Azerbaijan Academy of Arts.

She has presented solo exhibitions at UNESCO in Paris, Passepartout Art Gallery in Milan, Expocentre in Cannes, Baku Gallery in Berlin and Humei Gallery in England.
