= Monument to Sattar Bahlulzade =

Monument in Əmircan, Baku, Azerbaijan

- Azerbaijani: Səttar Bəhlulzadənin heykəli
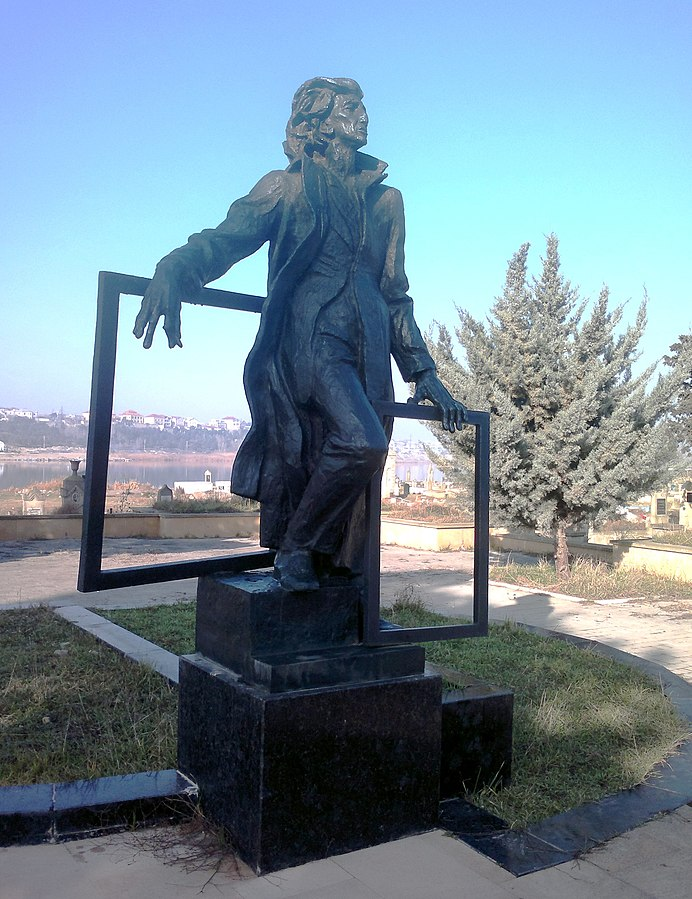
- Interactive map of Monument to Sattar Bahlulzade
- Location: Əmircan, Baku, Azerbaijan
- Designer: Omar Eldarov
- Material: Bronze
- Opening date: 1975
- Dedicated to: Sattar Bahlulzade

The Monument to Sattar Bahlulzade (Azerbaijani: Səttar Bəhlulzadənin heykəli) - is a monument to the Azerbaijani artist Sattar Bahlulzade above his grave in the cemetery of the artist's native village, Amirjan, near the Bulbula lake. The sculptor of the monument is Omar Eldarov. The monument was raised in 1975, a year after the death of the artist.

Bahlulzade is depicted looking at his favorite landscape, leaning on two empty picture frames. According to the art critic Samir Sadigov, the space, composition, dynamics and image in the sculpture complement each other. The frames, according to Sadigov, in addition to the spatial and aesthetic role, also play the role of an image. The frames are arranged in such a way that the viewer looking at the portrait, depending on the place, will see through them the village of Amirjan and the lake Bulbula from a new perspective.

The art critic Ziyadkhan Aliyev spoke about the monument to Sattar Bahlulzade:

The image of our immortal artist lives in the hearts of all people being reflected in the humanity and philosophical idea of Sattar's works. The sculptor, Omar Eldarov, was able to show in the image of his friend Sattar Bahlulzadeh the real hot temper and the real talent of Sattar.

The sculptor Omar Eldarov said that he created a monument to Sattar Bahlulzade "at the call of his heart".
