= Ogtay Mirgasimov =

Azerbaijani film director, screenwriter and film producer

Ogtay Mirgasimov Oqtay Mirqasımov
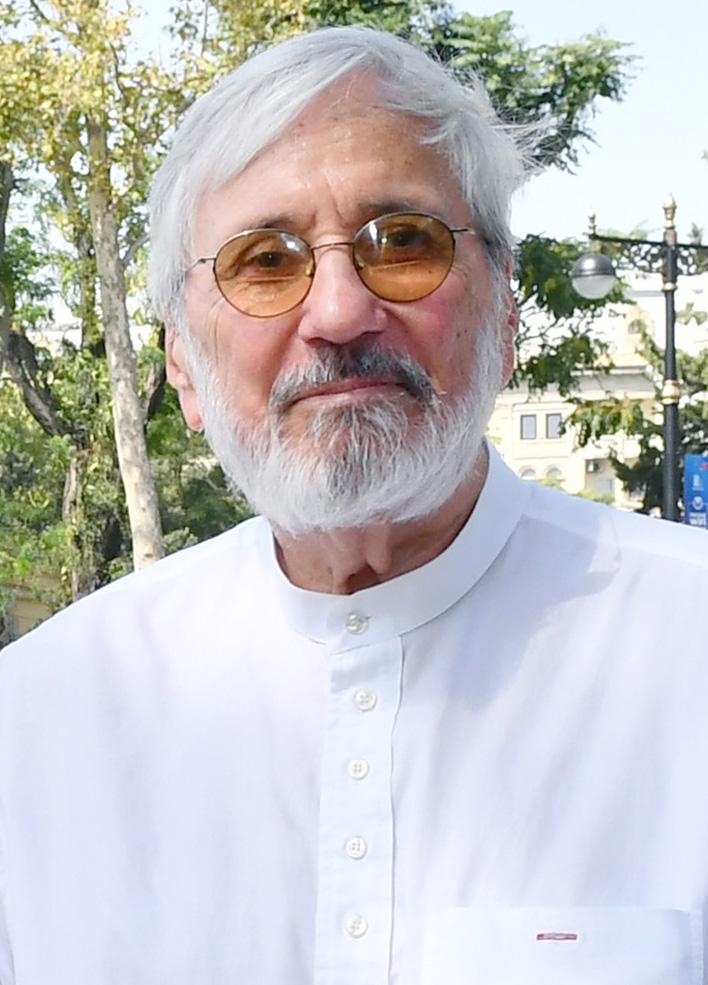
- Born: June 12, 1943 (age 83); Baku, Azerbaijan SSR, USSR
- Education: Gerasimov Institute of Cinematography
- Occupations: film director, screenwriter, film producer
- Father: Mirasadulla Mirgasimov
- Awards

Ogtay Mirasadulla oghlu Mirgasimov (Azerbaijani: Oqtay Mirəsədulla oğlu Mirqasımov, born June 12, 1943) is an Azerbaijani film director, screenwriter, film producer and a recipient of People's Artiste of Azerbaijan award.

== Biography ==
Ogtay Mirgasimov was born on June 12, 1943, in Baku. In 1963–1968, he studied at the directing faculty of Gerasimov Institute of Cinematography in Moscow, and returned to Baku to "Azerbaijanfilm" film studio.

In 1992–2001, he worked as the general director of "Azerkinovideo" Production Union. His films received awards at All-Union festivals.

== Awards ==
On December 18, 2000, he was awarded the People's Artiste of Azerbaijan award. In 2003, he was given the Shohrat Order honour by the president of Azerbaijan. In 2018, he was given the Sharaf Order award and in 2023, he was awarded Istiglal Order
