= Aliagha Vahid Monument =

Monument in Azerbaijan

- Azerbaijani: Əliağa Vahidin heykəli
- Interactive map of Aliagha Vahid Monument
- Location: Baku, Azerbaijan
- Coordinates: 40°21′58″N 49°49′56″E
- Designer: Rahib Hasanov Natig Aliyev
- Type: Memorial
- Material: bronze
- Length: 3 m
- Opening date: October 27, 1990
- Dedicated to: Aliagha Vahid

Aliagha Vahid Monument (Azerbaijani: Əliağa Vahidin heykəli) is a monument in Baku, capital of Azerbaijan, in honor of the Azerbaijani poet and ghazal singer Aliagha Vahid (1895–1965). It was built in 1990.

== History ==
A monument to Azerbaijan's poet and ghazal singer Aliagha Vahid was first proposed in 1989. It was designed and sculpted solely by Rahib Hasanov. The architect was Sanan Salamzade. The creative process that had lasted several months was completed in March 1990. The constant, intense endeavors and efforts undertaken by the three artists were artistically and architecturally addressed in the monument. The originality of the monument's form and shape is based on the famous hemistich of the poet nicknamed "Ghazalkhan (Khan of the ghazals) "I am the successor of great Fuzuli". The authors saw the tree trunks rising out of the ground as an artistic sign of the continuation by Vahid of the best tradition of Fuzuli. And the solution of the monument as a large tree-portrait was realized to give the hemistich a comprehensive artistic appearance. Sculptor Rahib Hasanov said the following about the monument:

Architects Sanan Salamzade and Jahangir Mammadov commissioned me to create a statue of Aliagha Vahid in 1989. Having thought about this a little bit, I made a model of the statue out of plasticine. When we look at the appearance of the statue, we see different episodes separately. It depicts Vahid's wedding party. He is attending his wedding. On the left side of the head is a mugham trio, which is equal to the size of its ear. This is a sign of the inseparability of the national music, mugham, and ghazal. On the other side is Vahid's funeral: Women in headscarves are mourning. At the back of his head, friends and colleagues of the poet are reciting poems and singing ghazals. Aliagha Vahid, Huseyn Javid, Mikayil Mushfig, Jafar Jabbarly, Azer Buzovnaly, Sattar Bahlulzade are also around the table. As Vahid was a lover of Fuzuli, the image at the bottom of the head depicting the assembly is an evidence of that. We human beings – both geniuses and ordinary people – are dust and to dust we will return. In the statue, the poet's head takes root, growing like a tree. The world is falling apart and changing caused by earthquakes, but the Earth remains forever. These trees are also growing on it. This is what is Vahid's secret. The philosophy of life of a ghazalkhan.

The process of bronze founding was conducted in St. Petersburg, USSR. The statute's height was previously measured as 5 meters, but it was later decided to reduce its size due to financial problems, now standing at 3 meters tall. Although the monument is made in the form of the poet's head, in fact, it is a multiplot sculpture sample. The statue was officially inaugurated on October 27, 1990, in the garden nor far from the Muslim Magomayev Azerbaijan State Academic Philharmonic Hall. In 2008, the statute was moved from the spot it had occupied since 1990. Its new location is Icherisheher.

== See also ==
- Khojaly Massacre Memorial
- Mustafa Kemal Atatürk Monument, Baku
- Wolfgang Amadeus Mozart monument, Baku
