= Togrul Narimanbekov =

Azerbaijani artist

- Toğrul Nərimanbəyov
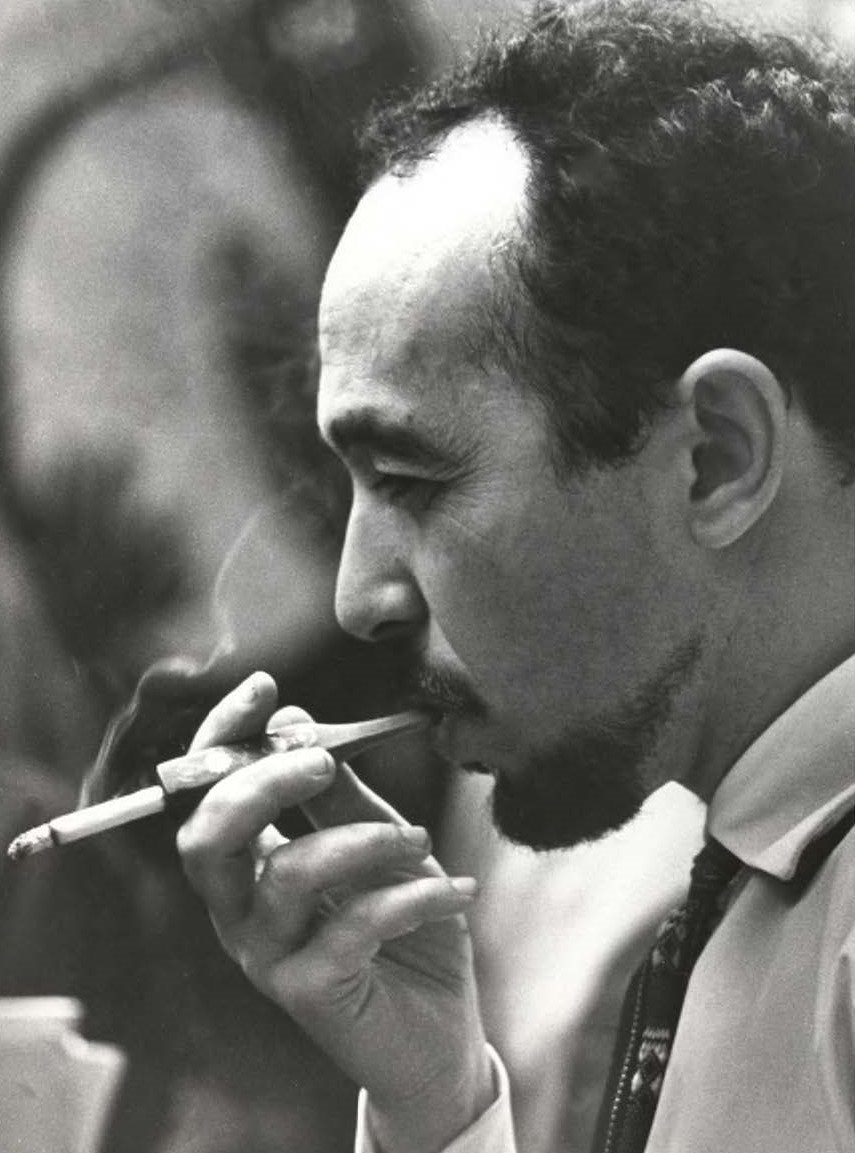
- Narimanbekov in 1972
- Born: Toğrul Fərman oğlu Nərimanbəyov; 7 August 1930; Baku, Azerbaijan SSR
- Died: 2 June 2013 (aged 82); Paris, France
- Known for: Artist, painter, scenographer, singer
- Awards: People's Artist of the Azerbaijan SSR (1967), USSR State Prize (1980), People's Artist of the USSR (1989), Order of Sovereignty (2000), Order of Glory (2010)

Signature
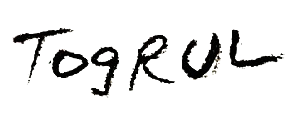

Togrul Farman oglu Narimanbekov (Azerbaijani: Toğrul Fərman oğlu Nərimanbəyov, Russian: Тогрул Нариманбеков; 7 August 1930 – 2 June 2013) was one of the prominent modern Azerbaijani artists, laureate of the State Prizes of the USSR and the Azerbaijan SSR, the People's Artist of the USSR and Azerbaijan, and a personal benefactor of the President of the Republic of Azerbaijan.

His works are exhibited in various museums and galleries around the world, including the "France Gallery" in France, the "Museum of Modern Art" in Germany (Cologne), the "Art Museum" in Germany (Hagen), the "Museum of Modern Art" in Poland (Warsaw), the "National Air and Space Museum" in the USA (Washington), the "Museum of Modern National Art" in Hungary (Budapest), the "Museum of Modern National Art" in Bulgaria (Sofia), the "Russian National Museum" in Russia (St. Petersburg), the "Tretyakov Gallery" in Russia (Moscow), the "Museum of the Peoples of the East" in Russia (Moscow), and the "Glinka Composer Museum" in Russia (Moscow).

Togrul Narimanbekov is the only Azerbaijani artist mentioned in the "Encyclopedia of Modern Fine Arts in France." In this book, his name is listed alongside other world-famous artists.

In addition to being a skilled painter, Togrul Narimanbekov was also a vocal artist and poet. He performed arias from classical operas, especially the works of Italian composers. In 1996, the painter held major concerts at the "Kirkha" concert hall in Baku, in 1998 at the Azerbaijan State Academic Opera and Ballet Theater, and in 2000 at the "Oratoria di San Rosso" hall in Bologna, Italy.

== Life ==
Togrul Ferman oglu Narimanbekov was born on August 7, 1930, in Baku. His grandfather, Amirbey Narimanbekov, was a lawyer who had been in exile during the reign of Tsar Nicholas II. He held lesson in Kyiv. After the establishment of the Azerbaijan Democratic Republic, he returned to Azerbaijan and worked as a governor in Baku. His father, Ferman Narimanbekov, was one of the 40 students sent abroad by the Azerbaijan Democratic Republic to study. He graduated with a degree in electrical engineering from Toulouse University while in France. While living in France, he married Irma Lya Rude, a dressmaker. Togrul's brother Vidadi was born in France.

In 1929, Ferman Narimanbekov returned to Baku with his wife Irma Lya Rude and their son Vidadi. Togrul Narimanbekov was born during that time. Towards the end of 1930, Ferman Narimanbekov, like other Azerbaijani intellectuals who had received education in Europe, became a victim of repression and was exiled to the Siberian city of Marinsk. Later, his mother was also arrested and exiled. Togrul Narimanbekov lived with his mother in exile for a while. He eventually started attending school, going to classes in the morning, and returning to the prison in the evening, enduring challenging circumstances. In 1941, when France was occupied by Germany, Irma Rude was given the ultimatum to renounce her French citizenship or be sent into exile, but she chose not to renounce her citizenship and was first sent to Kazakhstan and later exiled to Samarkand. While his parents were imprisoned, Togrul and his brother were looked after by their Polish aunt, Anna Andreyevna. Later, he painted a portrait of his aunt and named the painting "Mother.

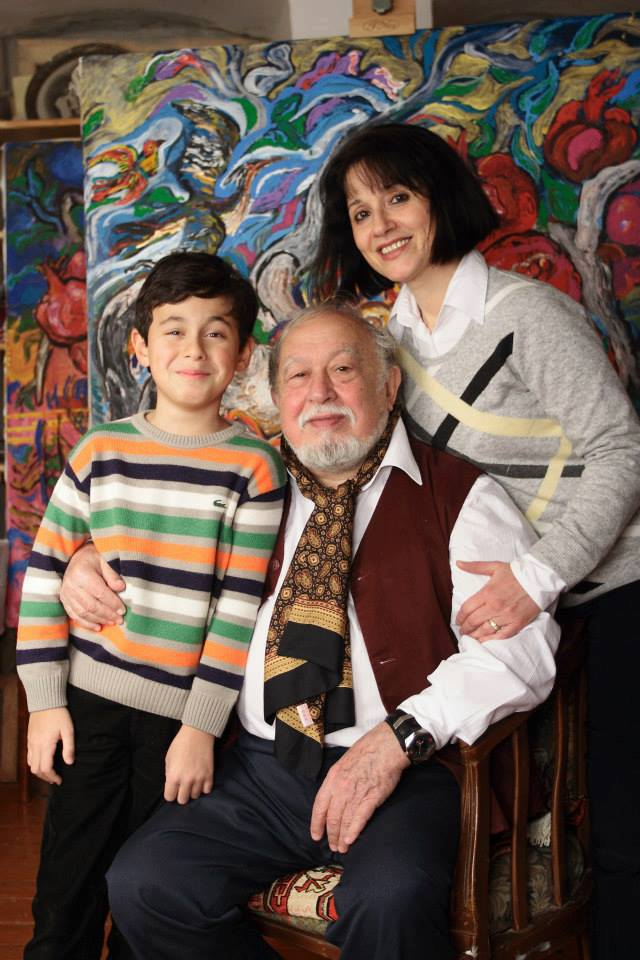
Togrul Narimanbekov with his wife and son

In 1946, Togrul Narimanbekov initially entered the Azim Azimzadeh State School of Painting in Azerbaijan. From 1950 onwards, he studied monumental and decorative painting at the Lithuanian Institute of Fine Arts. He graduated from there in 1955. At the same time, he began studying classical vocal music at the Vilnius Conservatory. During his student years, he met his mother in Samarkand. In 1961, Togrul's mother received amnesty and returned to Baku. His father, Ferman Bey Narimanbekov, who had been exiled to Siberia, also returned to his homeland after some time.

From the 1980s onward, Togrul Narimanbekov lived in several countries. He first traveled from Baku to Moscow and lived there for a while. In 1989, he was invited to Boston, Massachusetts, USA, where he held solo exhibitions. In 1992, he moved to the city of Luxembourg. He continued his artistic career in Luxembourg in 1992-1993. He held exhibitions in several galleries, which garnered significant attention. In 1993, he moved from Luxembourg to Paris. The reason Paris was particularly appealing to the artist was that his mother, Irma Rude, was originally French. The period of his life in Paris is considered one of the most productive in the artist's creative career.

=== Family ===
Togrul Narimanbekov married twice during his lifetime. His first wife was sculptor Elmira Huseynova. From this marriage, Togrul Narimanbekov had a daughter, Asmar Narimanbekov, who became an artist. Elmira Huseynova died on January 23, 1995. The painter later entered into a second marriage with the musician Sevil Nejefzade. From this marriage, he had a son named Fransua Narimanbekov, who followed in his father's footsteps and became involved in painting.

== Creativity ==
=== Early years ===
The artist's work is associated with the styles of abstractionism and figurativism. His works in various fields such as landscape, portrait, monumental painting, illustration, and theater art are characterized by thematic and genre diversity, as well as a distinctive style. The main features that define his personal style have been closely connected with the color harmony of decorative Azerbaijani art and the new directions of contemporary world art.

During the Soviet Union period, art critics who studied the artist’s work always described Togrul Narimanbekov as an “innovator.”

Togrul Narimanbekov began his artistic career in the 1950s. He says the following about this:

The years when I first came to art were very chaotic and contradictory. It was a period when a direction like socialist realism held great importance in art. Moreover, artists were assigned the political task of acting as “mobile exhibitors.” This was a policy aimed at restricting the artistic freedom of talented individuals and creating only formulaic works of art in the style of socialist realism.

When Narimanbekov began his artistic career, some of his early works showed the influence of European and Russian art. Azerbaijani art enthusiasts, whose eyes were accustomed to traditional paintings, did not unanimously accept the artist's distinct artistic style.

In 1950, the artist joined the Azerbaijan State Art Exhibition with his work titled Street of Turkey. Later, in 1953, he created Portrait of My Brother, depicting his brother Vidadi Nərimanbəyov, and Venus Nights. He completed one of his most successful paintings, Return from the Summer Pasture, in 1954. Nərimanbəyov’s 1955 graduation thesis at the Faculty of Painting of the Lithuanian Art University, Baltic Fishermen, is considered one of the most valuable early works of the artist.

In 1955, he returned to his homeland, Azerbaijan. During this period, there were differences in the perspectives on life and art among the artists living in Azerbaijan. Narimanbekov constantly experimented within various movements and directions. He created many successful works in different branches of painting, especially in landscape, portrait, and still life.

In his early landscape and still life works, the artist was influenced by the “severe style” of art. His first works in this direction include Garden in Baku (doorway) (1955), View of Bayil (1955), and Baku at Noon (1956). His 1963 painting Trees and Rocks is also a landscape work created in this style. His first still life works in this direction include Fruits, Still Life with Pumpkin, and Pomegranates and Pears.

One of Togrul's first successful works, "Dawn on the Caspian" (1957), was painted in a romantic style. His paintings "Stronger Than the Storm"(1960), "Happiness" (1961), "Joy" (1963), which depict brave oil workers, and "For Life" (1963), which portrays the harsh conditions of a Nazi prison, stand out for their dramatism and the artist’s philosophical reflections.

In the works he created during his 1961 expedition to Poland — "Portrait of a Young Polish Girl", "Meeting", "In the Café", "Krakow", "Polish Circus", and others — he depicted developing cities, people’s lives, their spiritual world, lovers living in love, and young people relaxing in cafés. In the early stages of his artistic career, the artist also painted notable portraits. His portraits from this period — "Turkish Poet Nazim Hikmet" (1960), "Driver Mammadaga" (1960), "Poet Rasul Rza" (1964), "Vocal Artist Bulbul" (1964), "Poet Bakhtiyar Vahabzade" (1965), as well as "Smoking Sattar Bahlulzade" (1961) and "Portrait of the Artist" (1962), both painted in oil on canvas — are among his most valuable portrait works.

In the 1963 painting "Mother", Narimanbekov depicted Anna Andreyevna, a Polish woman who cared for him and his brother while their mother and father were in exile.

=== 1960s-1980s ===
The 1960s–1980s were a period of mastery in Narimanbekov's art. During these years, painting in the Soviet Union was experiencing a phase of development. The second half of the 1960s is also considered a time when new artistic movements emerged. In this period, he boldly continued his artistic explorations. In his works from this time, particularly in landscapes and still lifes, Narimanbekov expressed the idea of the fertility of Azerbaijani land.

Together with his close friend, the other famous Azerbaijani artist Sattar Bahlulzade, he traveled through various regions of Azerbaijan. As a result of these journeys, he created works such as In the Orchards of Goychay (1965), Abundance (1968), Fertility (1968), and others. In his landscape paintings, Narimanbekov most often depicted Baku, the city where he was born. During the middle period of his artistic career, he produced works using oil on canvas such as Old Baku (1964), Spring in Baku (1964), Baku (1965), and Windy Day in Baku (1977). His attachment to Baku, its history, and architecture was most prominently reflected in his depictions of old cityscapes.

In Narimanbekov ’s thematic works, we see the prominence of ideas such as abundance and a good life. He created many works depicting his homeland Azerbaijan, the lifestyle of its people, their daily lives, and customs and traditions. Influenced by folk life, he addressed festive themes in works such as Holiday in Buzovna Village (1965) and Festival (1982), and market scenes in works like Suburban Baku Market (1968), Market in Baku (1974), Shaki Market (1976), and Autumn Market (1976), where he portrayed the lively and colorful atmosphere of Eastern bazaars.

During this period of his art, Narimanbekov also placed great importance on portrait painting. The most significant feature of his portraits was that he would first build a long-term friendship with his subjects, and only after getting to know them would he depict their inner world, ideas, and thoughts through various lines and colors.

In the 1960s–80s, the artist painted portraits of Azerbaijani writers, poets, and artists such as "Poet Fikret Goja" (1966), "Writer Anar" (1968), "Composer Emin Sabitoglu" (1977), "Singer Yaver Kelenterli" (1977), and "Georgian artist Niko Pirosmani" (1966), among others. Toğrul’s work "Portrait of My Mother" (1981), depicting his mother, the French-born Irma Lia Rudeni, also holds an important place in his creative work. In his self-portrait "Self-Portrait" (1976), it is possible to understand that he was in search of his artistic path.

During this period, Nərimanbəyov also painted portraits of children. His successful works on this theme include "Young Artist" (1965), "Tomik" (1969), "Günel" (1972), "Aysel" (1974), "Günay" (1975), and others. In the compositions "Sleeping Asmar" (1964) and "Girl and Still Life" (1968), depicting his daughter, the little girl is shown as a symbol of purity and abundance in nature, under rose bushes, flowers, and a fruit-bearing pomegranate tree.

Since Narimanbekov was also a professional musician, he constantly created works on musical themes. His artistic personality undoubtedly found reflection in his works. The mastery in his paintings stems from his delicate nature and artistic sensitivity. Works such as Singing Ashiq, Musicians, Ashiq Panah, Song, and others are music-themed pieces created by the artist during that period. His 1965 composition Mugham, which deals with the Azerbaijani folk music genre Mugham, holds an important place in his artistic career. This work is considered one of the masterpieces of Azerbaijani fine art and is among the artist’s most famous paintings.

Striving to create a unique style in modern Azerbaijani painting, Narimanbekov began producing a series of works influenced by Eastern folk epics, legends, and myths. In 1969, in his composition Abundance, created during a time dominated by Soviet ideology, the artist depicted this meaningful theme with an innovative style. His travels to various countries gave him the opportunity to familiarize himself with the works of great artists from ancient and modern times, visit the world’s most famous cities and museums, learn about the customs and traditions of other peoples, and communicate with ordinary people. After an artistic trip to India in 1971, Narimanbekov began creating a series of works about this country starting in 1972. In works such as Walk in Delhi, Market in India, Mahatma Gandhi, Mother and Child, Wishing Tree, Boy with a Windmill, Morning in a Bengal Village, Memories of Bombay, and others, the artist depicted India, a country hosting diverse cultures, its hospitable people, rich nature, and everyday life.

Alongside the "India" series, Nərimanbəyov worked on many landscape paintings in the composition "City Views" as a result of his travels. This includes depictions of the cities of Samarkand (Uzbekistan), Vilnius (Lithuania), Moscow (Russia), Havana (Cuba), and cities in Germany.

In the second half of the 1970s, Togrul Narimanbekov began painting murals. Between 1975 and 1978, he created the magnificent mural titled "In the World of Fairy Tales" in the foyer of the Azerbaijan State Puppet Theater, based on motifs from folk tales. This work was his first step and first successful piece in the art of mural painting. In 1978, Narimanbekov completed another major project by producing the painting "The Ashiq’s Song" on the walls of the foyer of the "Moscow" hotel in Baku. Like his paintings, these murals are valuable works of art inspired by national folklore. After this, Narimanbekov began not only designing theater decorations but also stage equipment. Working together with the prominent Azerbaijani composer Fikret Amirov, he created brilliant decorative compositions with rich color in the operas "Sevil" (1979), "Nasimi" (1979), and the ballets "One Thousand and One Nights" (1980). He also sketched stage decorations for Faraj Garayev’s ballet "Gobustan Shadows" (1969) and Gara Garayev’s ballet "Seven Beauties" (1972).

Togrul Narimanbekov prepared compositions and illustrations for "Azerbaijani Folk Epics", the poetry collection "While There is Time" by Azerbaijani poet Rasul Rza, and the book and film "Dada Gorgud" by writer Anar. The illustrations created for the book "Dada Gorgud", which deals with the stories of this common Turkish folk heritage, are among the most valuable examples of Azerbaijani painting. This book was published during the Soviet era by the "Detskaya izdatelstva" (Children’s Publishing House) in Moscow, the capital of Russia.

== Exhibitions ==
- In 1989, a solo art exhibition was held in one of the famous galleries in the city of Boston, where more than 70 paintings and graphic works were displayed. Art lovers there saw familiar faces such as "Guitarist Şehels," "Young Composer Romeo Meloni," "American Woman," and others. Later, at an exhibition held in New York City, over 70 paintings and graphic works were also presented to the audience.
- In 1992-1993, solo art exhibitions were held at the "Continental" hotel and the "Chateau Burkslenkr" gallery in Luxembourg. These personal art exhibitions by the artist attracted large audiences and made a strong impression, similar to the exhibitions in Boston and New York in the USA. At both exhibitions, the famous writer Chingiz Aitmatov, who was then the ambassador of Kyrgyzstan to Luxembourg, participated and highly praised Togrul Narimanbekov’s art in an interview with a Luxembourg magazine: "...Togrul is an artist who adds emotion to colors and convinces people to live. After seeing the works displayed at the exhibition, especially the painting ‘Eldar, the Son of Chingiz Aitmatov,’ I felt this even more deeply."
- Between 1993 and 1998, several solo exhibitions of Togrul Narimanbekov were held in France. In 1998, on the occasion of the 80th anniversary of the Azerbaijan Democratic Republic, a major solo exhibition was organized at the Convent des Cordeliers exhibition hall in Paris. The exhibition attracted attention with works such as “Old Baku,” “Sattar Bahlulzade Smoking,” “Singing Azerbaijan,” “Night Tea House,” “Morning at the Tea House,” “Eastern Market,” “Sevil in the Old City,” “Paradise Garden,” as well as paintings created in Paris like "Thoughts about Paris," "Saint Michel," "Notre Dame," "Girl from Notre Dame," "Paris Street," "Montmartre," "Paris Flowers," "Notre Dame Church," "Portrait of Irma Lya Ruden," and others. At this exhibition, well-known figures such as Princeton University professor Bernd R. Seizinger, Sorbonne University professor and collector Rene Gere, and researcher Kleopatra Pavlidou expressed their admiration and positive opinions about Togrul Narimanbekov 's art. Bernd R. Seizinger established a gallery-museum named after Togrul Narimanbekov in Boston.

== As an opera artist ==
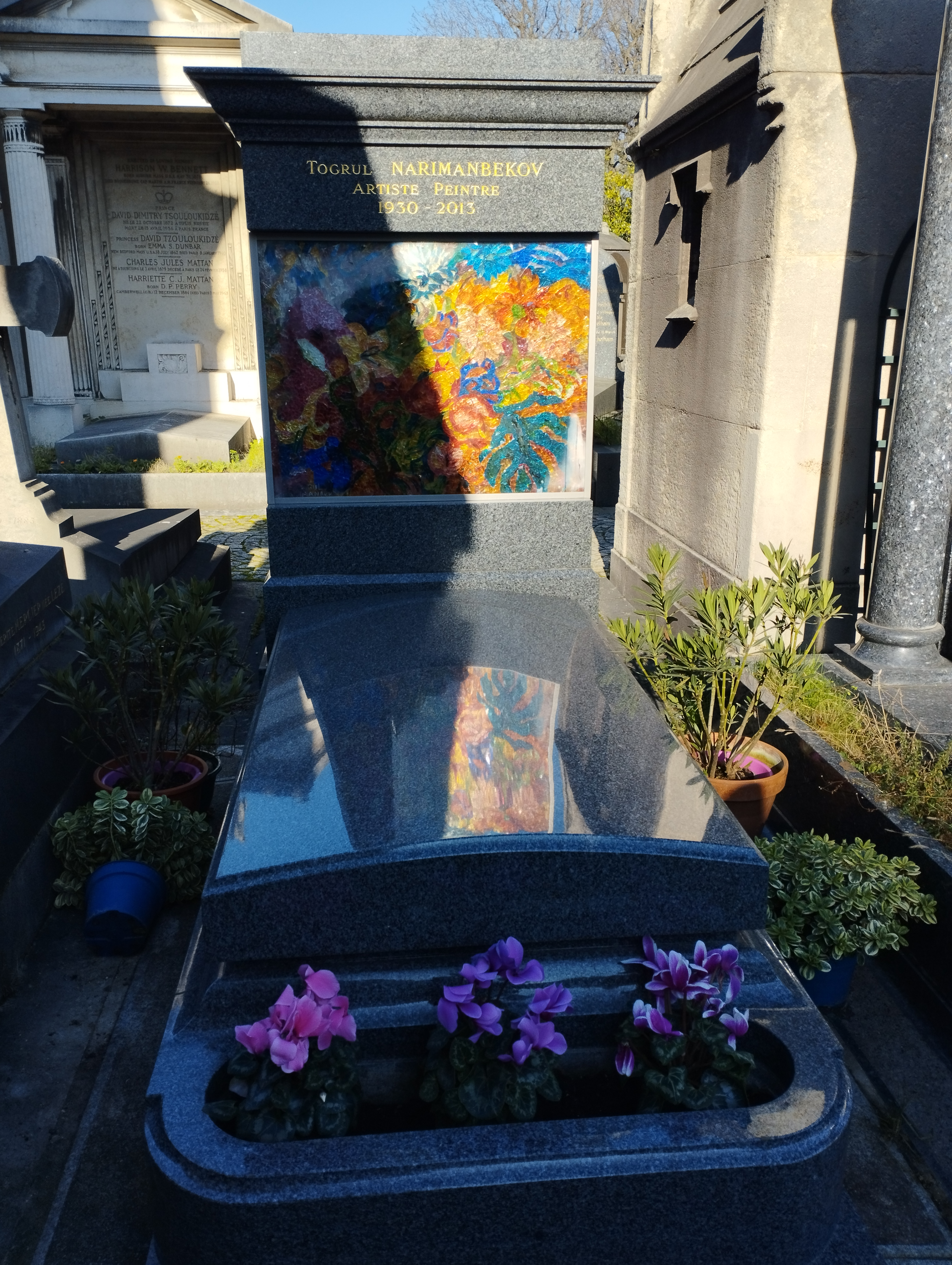
Tomb of Togrul Narimanbekov

He was not only a skilled painter but also a vocal artist and a poet. Togrul Narimanbekov performed arias from classical operas, especially works by Italian composers. The artist speaks about this talent:

I love singing. Singing is an integral part of my life. When I don’t sing, I feel uneasy. I always sing while painting. If God has given a person two talents, I believe it is ungrateful to abandon one and focus only on the other. Therefore, I consider singing as important in my life as painting. When people paint, they transfer what they want onto the canvas, and those works then separate from the person, but singing is within a person. What happens inside me while singing, how the voice is created, is still a miracle to me.

While studying painting at the Vilnius (Lithuania) Art University, Togrul Narimanbekov also began studying classical vocal music at the Vilnius Conservatory. Every time he came to Baku, he practiced at the Azerbaijan State Academic Opera and Ballet Theater. Sometimes he practiced at home, and since his wife Sevil was a musician trained at the conservatory, she accompanied him on the piano.

The artist gave major concerts in 1996 at the "Kirxa" concert hall in Baku, in 1998 at the Azerbaijan State Academic Opera and Ballet Theater, and in 2000 at the "Oratoria di San Rosso" hall in Bologna, Italy. In 1999, Narimanbekov received professional music education from private teachers in Italy. Since 2000, he has been a soloist at the Azerbaijan State Academic Opera and Ballet Theater.

== Death ==
He died on June 2, 2013, in a hospital in Paris. He was buried in the Passy Cemetery, located in the center of Paris.

== Awards ==
- "Honorary title of "Honored Artist of the Azerbaijan SSR" — 1964
- People's Artist of the Azerbaijan SSR — 7 July 1967
- State Prize of the Azerbaijan SSR — 1974
- State Prize of the USSR — 1980
- Order of the Red Banner of Labor — 1980
- Honorary title of "People's Artist of the USSR" — 22 June 1989
- Istiglal Order — 5 August 2000
- "Sharaf" Order — 9 August 2010

== Filmography ==
- Togrul Narimanbekov (film, 1966) — (short documentary television film)
- Gobustan (film, 1967)
- Hands and Colors (film, 1974)
- Dada Gorgud (film, 1975) — author of pictures (full-length feature film)
- Dante's Anniversary (film, 1978) — actor (full-length feature film)
- Melody of Colors (film, 1981)
- Hello, Zeynab! (film, 1982) — (short documentary-feature television film-concert)
- Seven Beauties (film, 1982) — costume designer (full-length film-ballet)
- Togrul (film, 2011)
