= Wolfgang Amadeus Mozart monument, Baku =

Wolfgang Amadeus Mozart monument
- Volfqanq Amadey Motsart
- Interactive map of Wolfgang Amadeus Mozart monument
- Location: Baku, Azerbaijan
- Designer: Natig Aliyev (sculptor); Chingiz Farzaliyev
- Type: Statue
- Opening date: 12 October 2011
- Dedicated to: Wolfgang Amadeus Mozart

Wolfgang Amadeus Mozart monument was erected in Baku, in 2011. It is dedicated Wolfgang Amadeus Mozart, an Austrian composer. The statue was erected on 12 October 2011 in Baku. President of Azerbaijan Ilham Aliyev and president of Austria Heinz Fischer inaugurated the monument. The author of the statue is an architect and painter Chingiz Farzaliyev and sculptor Natig Aliyev. The area around of the monument has been renovated and a park was built on an area of 2,300 square meters.
