= Chingiz Farzaliyev =

Azerbaijani artist and professor

- Çingiz Fərzəliyev
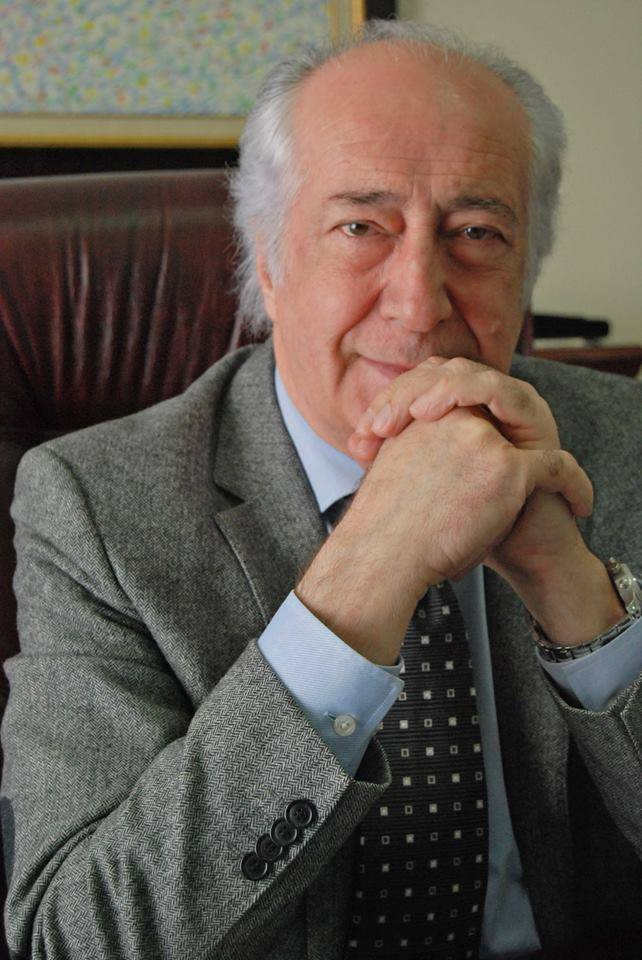
- Chingiz Farzaliyev in 2015
- Born: November 20, 1943 (age 82); Baku
- Citizenship: Soviet Union; Azerbaijan
- Education: Moscow State Academic Art Institute
- Occupation: Professor
- Years active: 1973–present
- Awards: Shohrat Order
- Website: chingizfarzaliyev.az

Chingiz Farzaliyev (Azerbaijani: Çingiz Fərzəliyev), is an Azerbaijani artist and professor. He received the honorary title of Honored Art Worker of Azerbaijan for fine arts.

== Life ==
Chingiz Farzaliyev was born on November 20, 1943, in Baku. In 1973, he graduated from the faculty of painting of the Moscow State Academic Art Institute. In 1975, he became a member of the Union of Artists of the USSR. Since 1966, he has been a participant of national, All-Union, and international exhibitions. Since 2004, he has been working as the head of the fine art chair at the Azerbaijan State Academy of Fine Arts. In 2006, he was awarded the honorary title of "Honored Art Worker of Azerbaijan". Since 2008, he works as a professor in the Azerbaijan State Academy of Fine Arts, and in 2010, he was the director of the Azerbaijan National Museum of Art from 2010 until 2023. He has also been the Chairman of the State Commission for Fine Arts since 2010.

== Honorary titles ==
- Honored Art Worker of Azerbaijan Republic, 2006;
- Honorary Member of the Russian Academy of Fine Arts, 2009;
- Honorary Professor of the Academy of Fine Art of Uzbekistan, 2012;
- Honorary Professor of the International Biographical Centre, University of Cambridge, United Kingdom, 2015;
- Honorary Doctor of the Tbilisi State Academy of Arts, 2015;
- Honorary Professor of the Moscow State Art Academic Institute named after V. I. Surikov, 2017;
- Full member of the Turkic World Studies International Academy of Sciences, 2019;
- ″Honoured Scientist and Cultural Worker of Europe″ for the contribution to the world of science and culture, European Academy of Natural Sciences, Hannover, Germany, 2021;

== Orders and awards ==
- 2nd prize at All-Union exhibition ″Youth of the Country″, a silver medal, USSR, 1976;
- 1st prize of All-Union competition ″Korchagins of the 70s″, USSR, 1977;
- Diploma of the International Association of the Union of Architects of the CIS countries, 1998;
- The ″Outstanding Personality in Art″ of the International Biographical Centre award from the University of Cambridge, United Kingdom, 2014;
- Grand Decoration of Honour for services to the Republic of Austria, 2015;
- Gold medal for ″The Best Patriotic Research Scientist of the Year″, European Press and Publishing House, Azerbaijan 2015;
- Grand Decoration of Honour for services to the Republic of Austria, 2015;
- Laureate of the Humay Award, 2015;
- Diploma of I degree in the nomination ″Art-book″ of XIII International Competition of the CIS countries, 2016;
- The Presidential Order of Brilliance, Georgia, 2016;
- Medal of TURKSOY for contribution to the promotion of Turkic art, 2018;
- Shohrat Order for merits in the development of fine art in Azerbaijan, 2018;
- Medal of the Azerbaijani Cultural Association ″Simurg″, 2019;
- Gold medal of the Russian Academy of Fine Arts, 2019;
- The Order of Arts and Letters, France, 2019;
- ″International Ataturk prize″ of the Turkic World Studies International Academy of Sciences for contribution to propaganda of Turkish world culture, Turkey, 2019;
- ″International Golden Star″ of the Turkic World Studies International Academy of Sciences for contribution into propaganda of Turkish culture, Turkey, 2019;
- Badge ″İlhamli (İnspired) Azerbaijan″ of public organization ″The Caucasus Media″ for services in the field of art, 2020;
- İnternational reward ″Medal of Leonard Eichler″ for the contribution into world science and culture, European Academy of Natural Sciences, Hannover, Germany, 2021;
- Silver medal of The Academy of Arts of Uzbekistan, Uzbekistan, 2022;
- Medal on behalf of Nizami Ganjavi of the Ministry of Culture of the Republic of Azerbaijan, 2022;

== Published works ==
- All About Still Life, Baku, 2004;
- All About Portrait, Baku, 2005;
- All About Landscape, Baku, 2006;
- Anthology of the Azerbaijani Painting, Baku, 2007;
- Azerbaijan State Museum of Art, Baku, 2010;
- Folk Art of Azerbaijan, Baku, 2013;
- 36 books from ″Sarvat″ series dedicated to 45 prominent representatives of Azerbaijani National Art of the 20th century, Baku, 2014;
- The book ″Varga and Gulshah″ devoted to the miniatures of manuscript of XIII century, Baku (2021);

== Curator of exhibitions ==
- ″At the Turn of Centuries″, 2010;
- ″In Between″ - Exhibition of Austrian modern art, 2011;
- ″The spirit of Budo - The History of Japan's Martial Art″, 2012
- ″Azerbaijani art through millenniums″, 2013;
- ″Russian Avant-Garde As Phenomenon in the Art of XX century″, 2015;
- ″French art from the collection of the Azerbaijan National Museum of Art″, 2017;
- ″Japanese art from the collection of Azerbaijan National Museum of Art″, 2018;

- ″German art from the collection of the Azerbaijan National Museum of Art″, 2019;
- ″On the Steps of Time″, 2019;
