= Sattar Bahlulzade =

Azerbaijani painter (1909–1974)

Sattar Bahlulzada
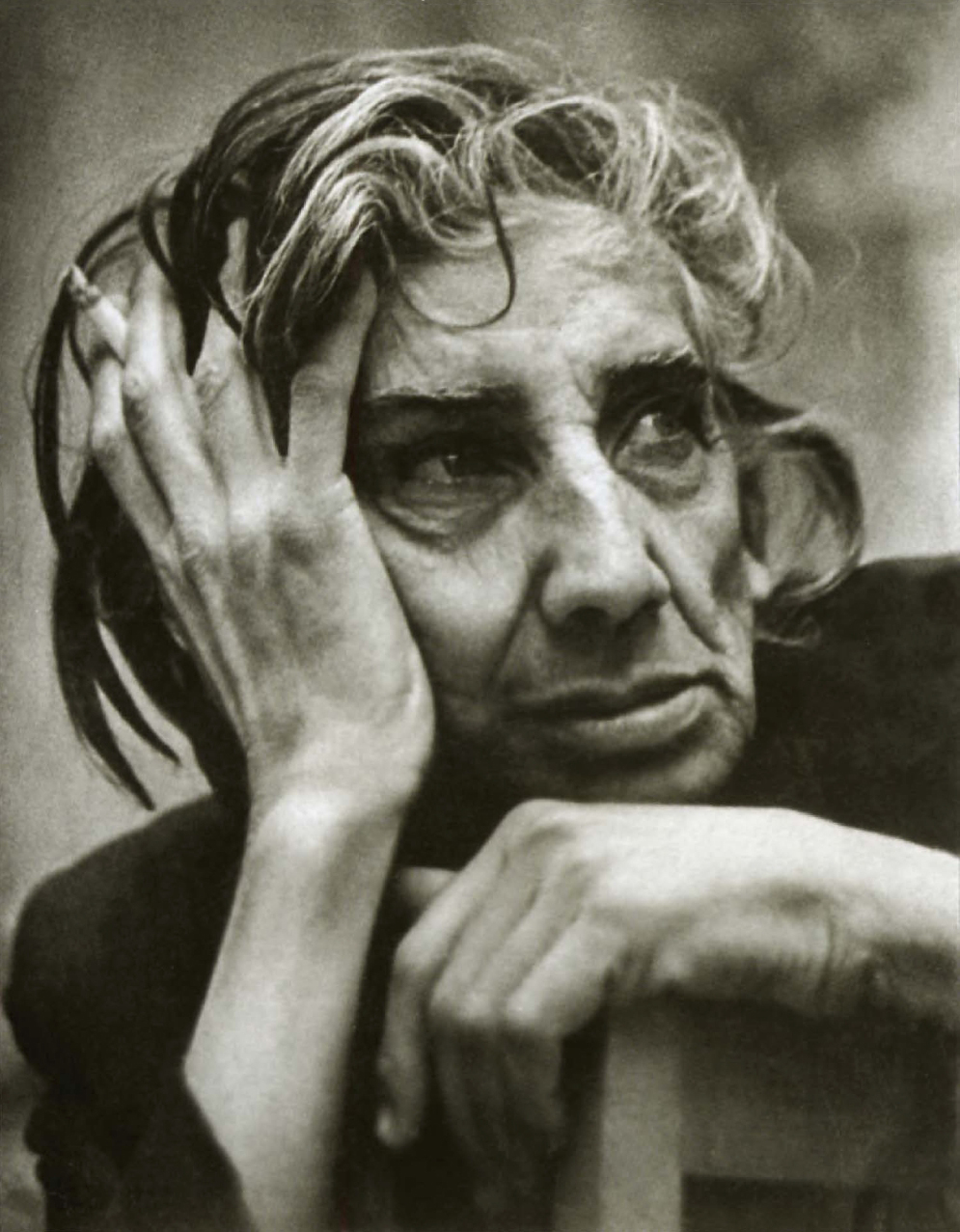
- Born: Səttar Bəhlul oğlu Bəhlulzadə; 15 December 1909; Baku, Russian Empire
- Died: 14 October 1974 (aged 64); Moscow, Russian SFSR, Soviet Union
- Known for: Landscape art, Portrait painting, Still life, History painting
- Movement: Impressionism, Neo-Impressionism
- Awards: Order of the Red Banner of Labour

Sattar Bahlulzade (Azerbaijani: Səttar Bəhlulzadə; 15 December 1909 – 14 October 1974) was an Azerbaijani painter, best known for his landscape paintings depicting the nature of Azerbaijan. He is considered to be the founder of Azerbaijani Impressionism.

Among Bahlulzade's best-known works are Tears of Kapaz (1965), Bank of the Gudiyalchay (1953), Dream of the Land (1961), Evening Above the Caspian Sea (1959), and Goygol (1964). His works have been featured in exhibitions in Azerbaijan, the Soviet Union, and other parts of the world. The majority of Bahlulzade's body of work is preserved in the National Art Museum of Azerbaijan, where a special hall is dedicated to the artist. Some of his paintings are also kept in museums in Moscow, Tbilisi, Beijing, etc.

Today, he is widely considered to be one of the greatest painters of Azerbaijan, as well as a prominent figure in the history of Azerbaijani art in general. He is the recipient of many awards, including two Orders of the Red Banner of Labour and People's Artist of Azerbaijan.

== Early life and education ==
Sattar Bahlulzade was born on 15 December 1909 in the village of Amirjan near Baku. He was the third child in the family after two elder sisters. Sattar developed a love for painting in his early childhood. After his father bought him colored pencils, Sattar drew everything around him - the Novruz holiday, Kos-kosa dances, children jumping over bonfires as part of the Novruz tradition, etc. Being surrounded by objects of folklore art - colorful carpets woven by his mother and grandmother, jewelry, as well as ceramics and copper dishes passed down from generation to generation - Sattar began to cultivate a love for art. In one of his diaries, the artist wrote:

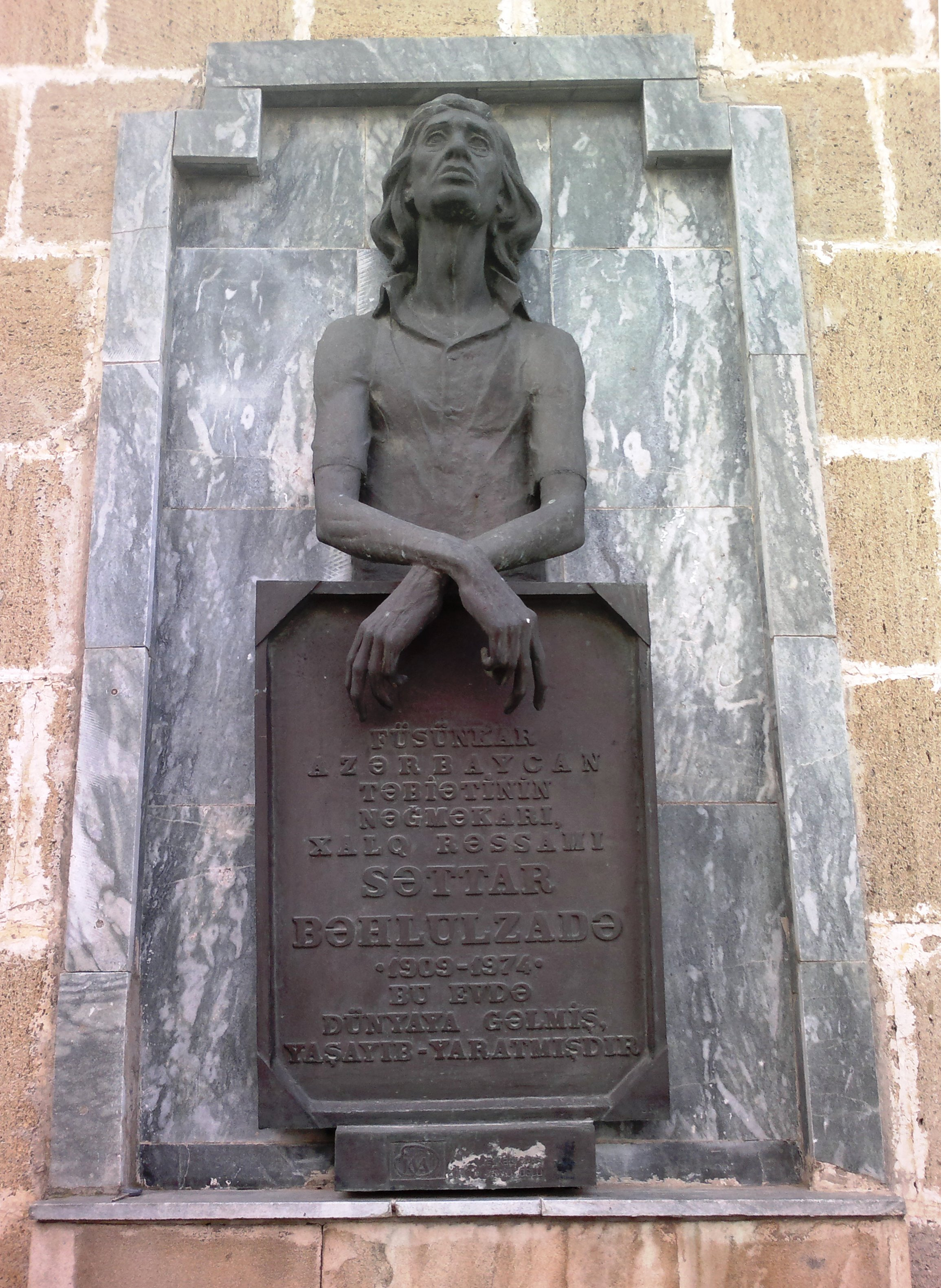
Sattar's sculpture on the house he was born in

"Everything had its own special place in the house. Mother arranged the dishes like an artist. She folded the blankets and beddings in a way that the color schemes matched. For her, it was a work of art, it was beauty."

At school, Sattar was fond of the poems of Nizami Ganjavi, Vagif, and Khaqani, but most of all, he was inspired by the poetry of Fuzuli and the characters in his version of the famous poem Layla and Majnun. He depicted these characters on the covers of his notebooks. His teachers liked Sattar's work, one of them telling him, "there is only one path forward for you, Sattar, and that is to become an artist." Bahlulzade's music teacher was the composer Muslim Magomayev, the grandfather of the iconic Soviet Azerbaijani singer Muslim Magomayev.

Sattar attended the National Art Institute in Baku starting in 1927. After graduating in 1931, he began working with Azim Azimzade for the newspaper "Communist" as a graphic illustrator. Bahlulzade worked in the editorial office for two years, during which his first works of art, cartoons, were published.

In 1933, began studying at the Moscow School of Painting, Sculpture and Architecture, where he became a student of Vladimir Favorsky. It is at this Institute that Bahlulzade started showing interest in landscape painting. His frequent summer trips to Crimea played an important role in developing his mastery of landscape art. There, Bahlulzade realized that painting really was his true purpose and path in life.

== Career ==
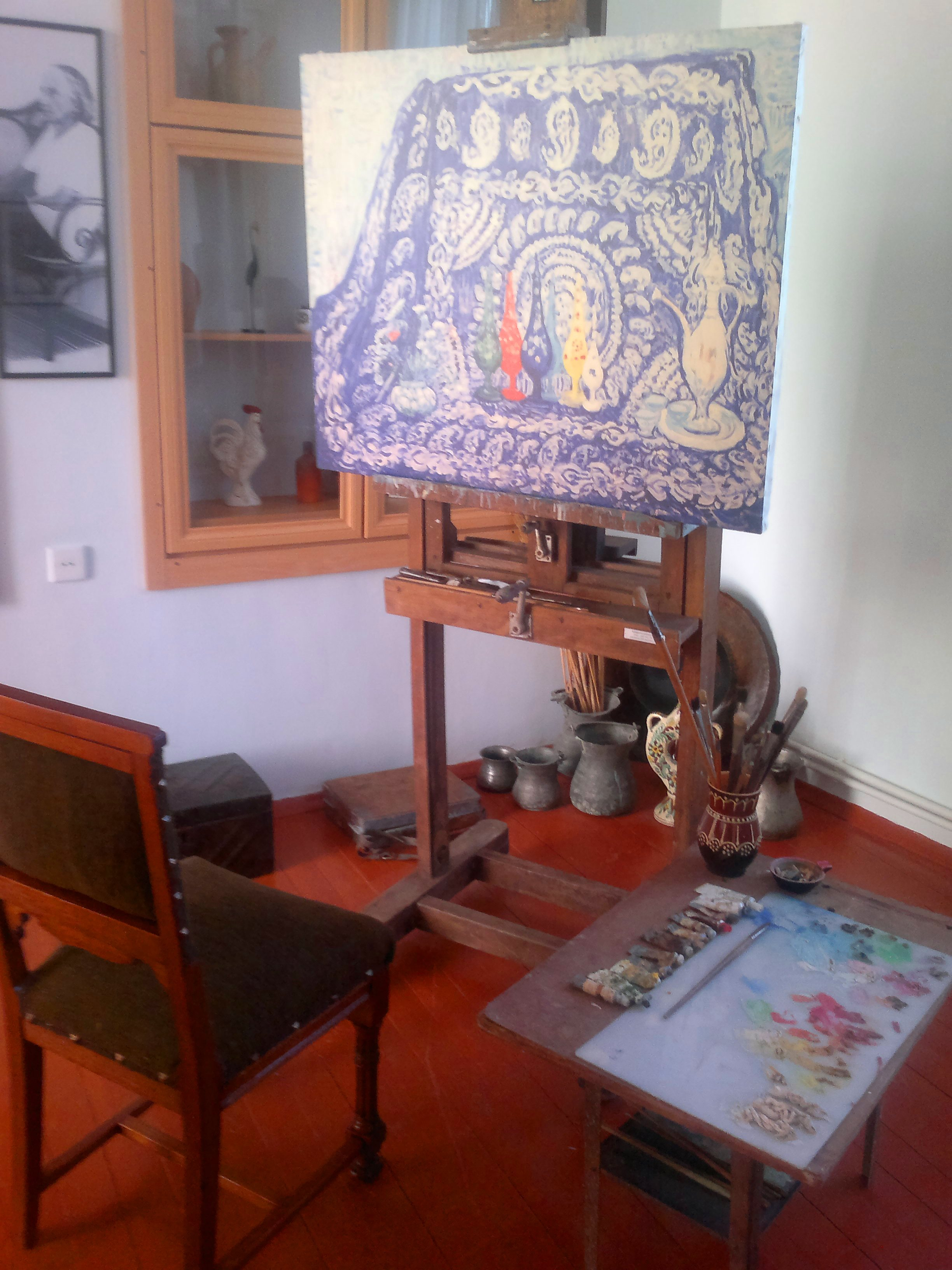
Bahlulzade's studio in his now house-museum

After his return to Baku, Bahlulzade's work focused on the depictions of historic personalities and events. in 1941, he became a member of the Artists' Union of the USSR. In the post-war years, Bahlulzade painted works depicting the oil fields, dachas, and villages of the Absheron Peninsula. Bahlulzade's attraction to depictions of nature grew, and he started to paint more landscape sceneries. Azerbaijani painter Azim Azimzade, impressed by Sattar's work, offered him a position at a Communist newspaper, where he was then chief illustrator.

Bahlulzade was known primarily for his landscape paintings dedicated to the nature of the Azerbaijan. Frequently, he went out into nature to capture on canvas all its beauty. Bahlulzade once said:

"I don't have to go to Tahiti, like Gauguin, for inspiration, and I do not advise others to do it. The life and land of your people - they are the true sources of inspiration."

Initially, the artist used a realistic approach to the portrayal of nature, as he was taught by his teachers. However, Bahlulzade soon developed his own style, which helped him to better express his emotions in his depictions of nature. His new style was actually more surreal and cosmic, with some of his works looking like satellite photographs of the Earth. Combining pastels with bold colors and bold brushstrokes, Bahlulzade illustrated nature more colorfully and lively, at times including fantastic elements.

Starting from the late 1940s, Bahlulzade started to create his most renowned works of art: The Bank of Qudyalchay, The Road to Gizbanovsha (1953), Golden Evenings (1955), Native Lands (1957), etc. In these landscapes, Bahlulzade satiated his color palette, achieving a colorful decorativeness in his displays.

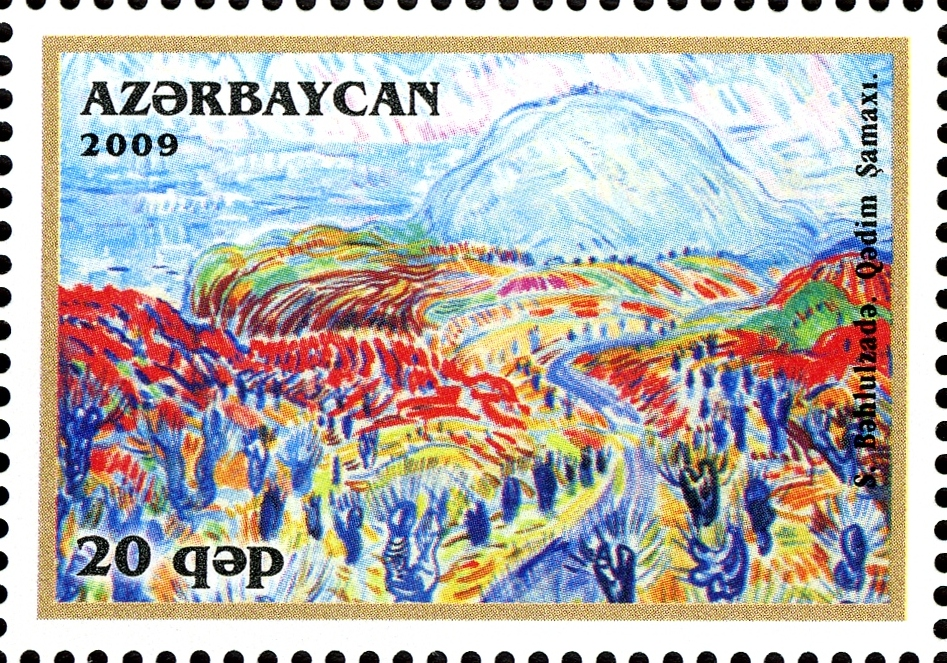
Stamp illustrating Ancient Shamakhi (1971)

Sattar Bahlulzade developed his work on both natural and industrial landscapes simultaneously. This was not without a reason. The painter could feel better than anyone the poetry of oil drills, which had been a feature of his childhood. In 1954, he visited the Oil Rocks offshore drilling complex, which was dubbed Island of Miracles at the time. He immediately became fascinated by the Island of Miracles. Sattar drew dozens of sketches there. He returned to Baku full of impressions and ideas about future oil industry landscapes. This led to a number of paintings, including Spring Morning in Baku (1959), Evening Above the Caspian Sea (1959), and Morning (1961).

A year before Bahlulzade's death, in 1973, a solo exhibition of the artist was published in Moscow. The Moscow press, covering this event, wrote: "The People's Artist of Azerbaijan Sattar Bahlulzade was only truly appreciated by a wider Russian audience after his personal exhibition in Moscow. I also fell in love with his work at first sight. The exhibition was simply stunning. It was a feast of colors and light in all their pristine clarity and poignancy. We simply did not know of such a beautiful and radiant Azerbaijan before Sattar Bahlulzade."

== Death ==
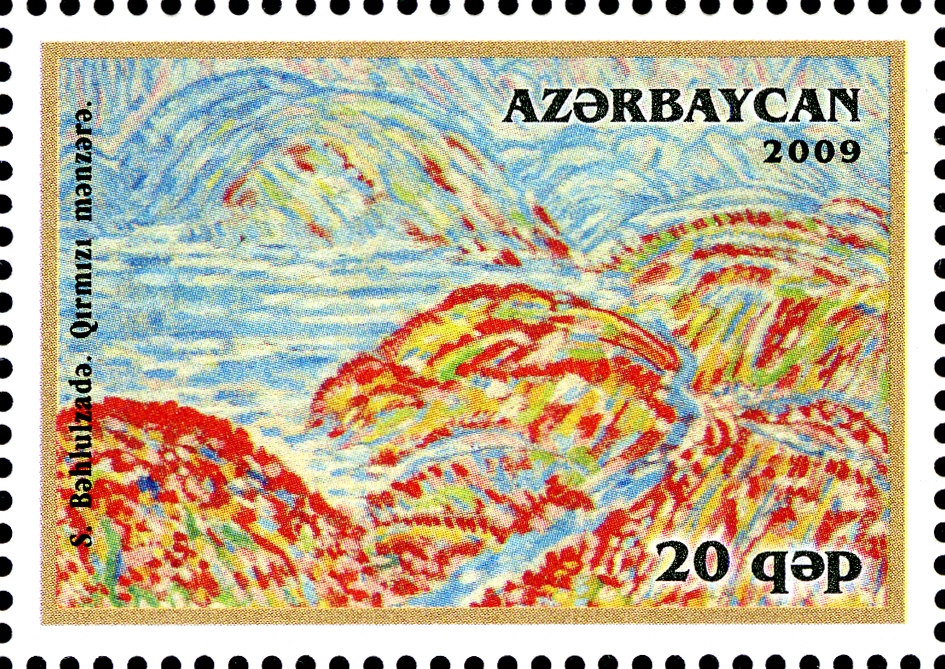
Stamp illustrating Bahlulzade's A Red View

In 1973, Bahlulzade became seriously ill due to blood poisoning. Although the artist was being treated in Sabunchu hospital in Baku, his condition was not getting better. The chief doctor of the hospital told him that the only way for him to recover was to continue his treatment in the Moscow. However, officials refused to pay for the artist's trip to Moscow, and so the trip was organized by his friends.

Sattar Bahlulzade died in Moscow on October 14, 1974. The artist was buried on October 16, not in the Alley of Honor in Baku as expected, but, at his own request, in his native village Amirjan, next to the grave of his mother. A monument was erected over Bahlulzade's grave by sculptor Omar Eldarov, depicting an artist with two empty picture frames.

== Style ==
Bahlulzade was a true lover of nature and saw himself as part of nature. He spent most of his life outdoors. One reason was that he wanted to be closer to nature, to understand nature, and portray it as it was. After graduating in Moscow in 1939 and returning to Baku, Sattar Bahlulzade was still developing his own style as a painter. As a painter, Sattar Bahlulzade could express himself better in harmony with nature, which we can see in the background of some of his most famous works. He spent a lot of time working on each painting. Among his works; however, there are no winter landscapes. The nature in winter attracted the artist to a lesser extent, and during this time of the year, he mostly painted in his personal studio, where he created new paintings based on his experiences in summer.

It took him much time and energy to capture nature. Sattar acknowledged this. He said:

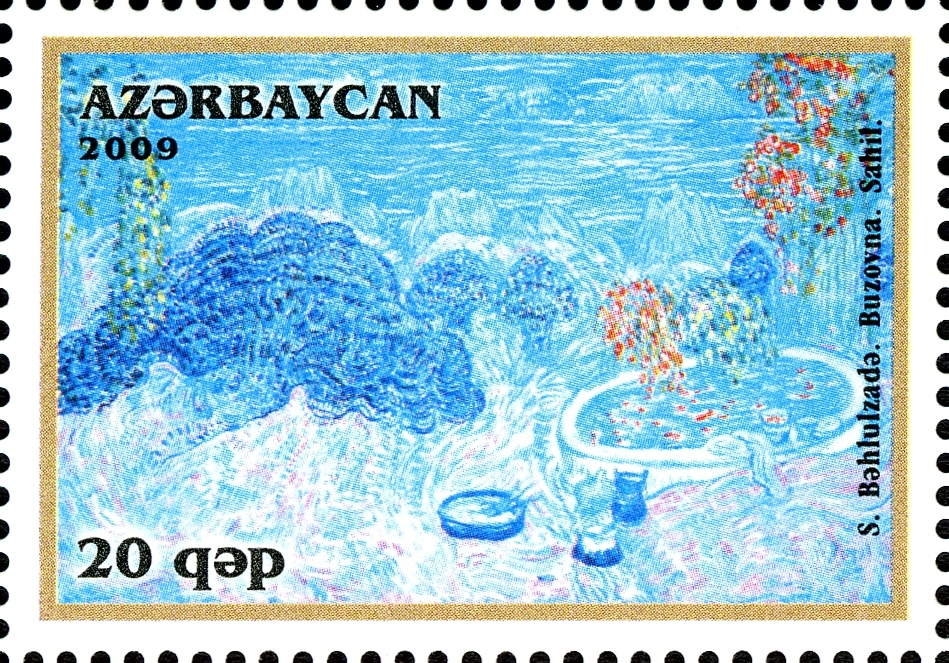
Stamp illustrating Bahlulzade's Morning in Buzovna

“Many people think that I can take a clean canvas and a paintbox and easily paint various moments in nature whenever I wish. They are wrong. This is not the case at all. I have always had a habit: most of the time, I first draw sketches for my pictures. Sometimes I do not draw sketches but keep them in my memory. For instance, the landscape "Tears of Kapaz" is drawn from memory. I did not draw any sketch for it. I had no opportunity to do that at the time anyway.

I remember my visit to Goygol together with Tahir Salahov and Togrul Narimanbekov. I woke up early in the morning and looked around. The sun was just rising. In the dawn, Kapaz [mountain] looked unusual to me. I cried out instinctively, waking Togrul and Tahir. They joined me where I was standing, and we looked at the unusual scene. None of us said a word or did anything. But I remembered that sight with all its brightness and mood. I copied that scene onto the canvas upon my return to Baku and called it The Tears of Kapaz. Togrul and Tahir were astonished when they saw the picture.

We have seen many pictures of Goygol so far. Of course, you can draw pictures of a thing or place many times. This is not very dangerous because every painter has his own approach and attitude to an object. What is most important is that a painter has to have his own creative view, his own fantasy, and creative thinking so that he does not look like others or repeat what other people have already done.”

== Character ==
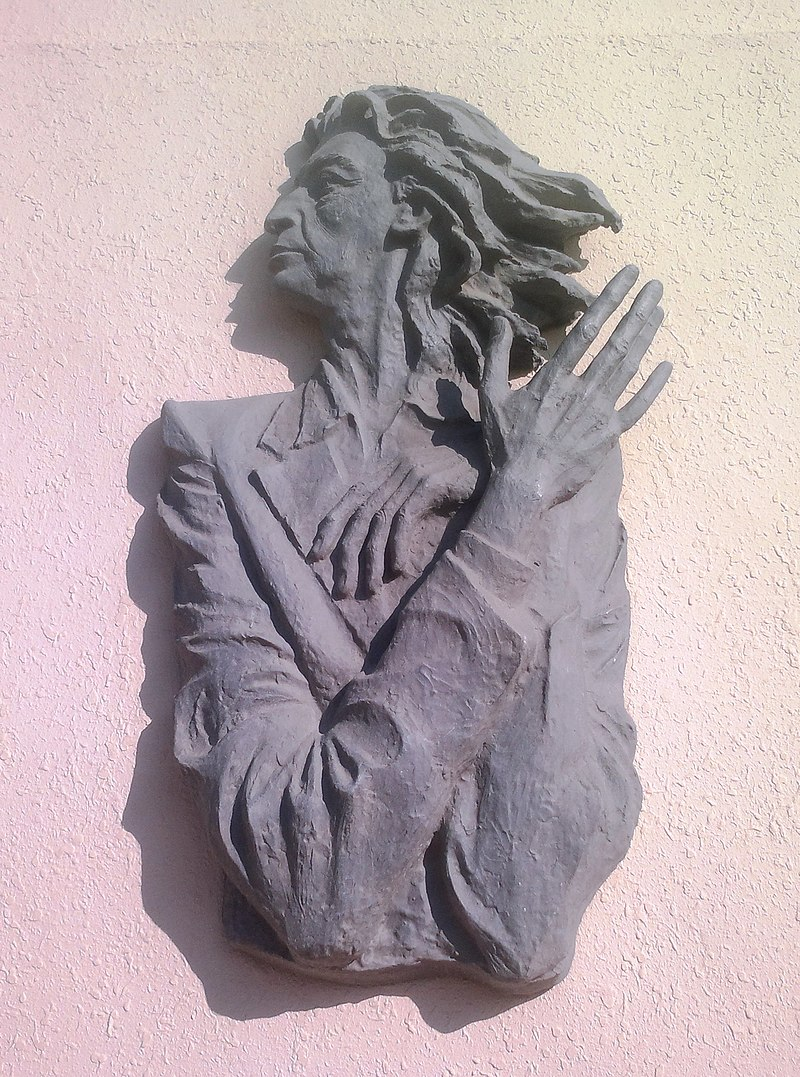
Relief of Bahlulzade on his house

For most of his life, Sattar Bahlulzade lived in his native village. The artist rarely went out to the city to visit friends and family. He was never married and did not have much personal life. However, he was a mentor figure to the painter Gayyur Yunus, who is from the same village.

Sattar was distinguished by his generosity. He often gave out his paintings as gifts. From time to time, the artist's studio was visited by foreigners interested in art. Once, an Italian guest expressed their desire to buy one of the artist's works. However, Sattar decided to give him a painting for free. When the guest told him that he could not accept such a valuable gift without giving something in return, Sattar replied, "I never give cheap gifts."

In 1964, the works of Bahlulzade were exhibited in the National Gallery in Prague. After the exhibition, five of the paintings were selected to be bought for the museum's collection. Nonetheless, Sattar refused the fee, offering the paintings to the gallery as a gift. These stories tell us about his lack of care for material possessions like money. He even smoked the cheapest brands of cigarettes.

Sattar had several unique physical features, one of which was his long hair. It is said that he had only cut his hair on two occasions in his entire life. The first time was when the Azerbaijani sculptor Fuad Abdurakhmanov decided to create a sculpture of the artist. Bahlulzade suspected that Fuad would be more interested in and focused on his hair than on his personality, and therefore he cut his hair and showed up in the sculptor's studio. Abdurakhmanov was naturally very surprised. Today, the resulting marble sculpture is displayed in the National Art Museum of Azerbaijan in Baku, illustrating the artist with short hair.

== Legacy ==
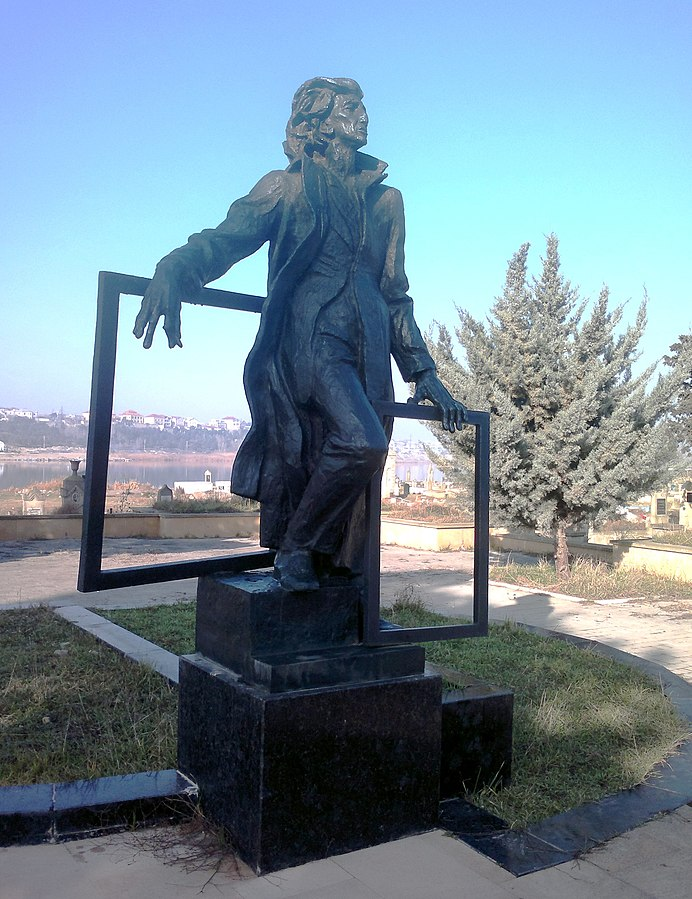
Monument of Bahlulzade on his grave in Amirjan

Bahlulzade's works have been shown at exhibitions of Soviet fine art in Algeria, Egypt, Lebanon, Syria, Tunisia, Norway, Germany, Czechoslovakia, Bulgaria, Hungary, Romania, Iraq, Cuba, Canada, Belgium, France, Japan, and other countries. The majority of the artist's paintings are stored in the National Art Museum of Azerbaijan, as well as museums in Moscow, Tbilisi, Yerevan, Beijing, and other cities around the world. In the National Art Museum of Azerbaijan, Bahlulzade's works are displayed in a separate room, which President Heydar Aliyev visited in 1994 to celebrate the 85th anniversary of Bahlulzade.

Bahlulzade's awards and titles include Order of the Red Banner of Labour (1959), Honored Artist of the Azerbaijan SSR (1960), and People's Artist of the Azerbaijan SSR (1963). In 1969, Sattar was awarded the Order of the Red Banner of Labour for the second time. In 1972, Sattar Bahlulzade was awarded the State Prize of the Azerbaijan SSR for his series of works denoted Landscapes of Azerbaijan.

A street in the Surakhani district of Baku is named after Bahlulzade. A house of culture in his native village, Amirjan, is also named after him. The life and work of Bahlulzade have been the subject of many documentaries, paintings, poems, and sculptures. On the artist's 100th anniversary (December 15, 2009), Azermarka issued a new series of postmarks titled Azerbaijani School of Fine Arts: Artist S. Bahlulzade. The series includes 6 stamps depicting Bahlulzade's paintings.
