= Omar Eldarov =

Soviet and Azerbaijani sculptor

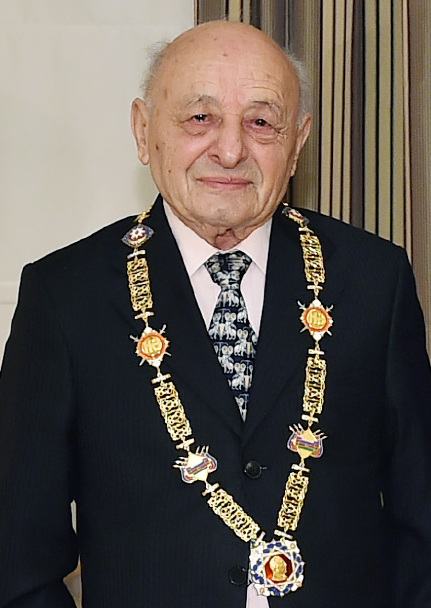
- Born: Omar Hasan oglu Eldarov; December 21, 1927 (age 98); Derbent, Dagestan ASSR, Russian SFSR, USSR
- Known for: sculptor-monumentalist

Omar Hasan oglu Eldarov (Azerbaijani: Ömər Həsən oğlu Eldarov) (born 21 December 1927) is an Azerbaijani sculptor. He has been awarded the titles of Honoured Art Worker of Azerbaijan (1962), People's Artist of Azerbaijan (1982), full member of the National Academy of Sciences of Azerbaijan (2001), full member of the Russian Academy of Arts (1988), and President of Azerbaijan State Academy of Fine Arts (2001).

== Work during the Soviet period ==
Omar Eldarov was born on December 21, 1927, in Derbent, Dagestan ASSR.

From 1942 to 1945, he studied at the Azerbaijan State Art School named after Azim Azimzade. In 1951, he graduated from the Institute of Painting, Sculpture and Architecture named after I.Y. Repin. He was a student of such notable masters as A.T. Matveyev, M.A. Kerzin and V.B. Pinchuk.

In 1980, he was awarded the USSR State Prize for his monument ensemble dedicated to Sadriddin Ayni in Dushanbe (1979). In 1959, he was awarded the Order of the Badge of Honor. He was also awarded the State Prize of the Azerbaijan SSR for the monument to P.A. Dzhaparidze in Baku (1980).

Famous works by Eldarov include the monument to Fizuli in Baku (1962, in collaboration with sculptor Tokay Mammadov), for which he was awarded the silver medal of the USSR Academy of Arts; the monument to Natavan (1960, Baku, in collaboration with architects E. Ismayilov and F. Leontyev); the Monument to Sattar Bahlulzade (1975); the portrait of the conductor Niyazi (1984); "Head of a Laughing Worker" (1984); "Mahatma Gandhi" (1987); "Avicenna" (1980); Rabindranath Tagore (1987); and portraits of Aysel (1988) and Ayten (1988).

== Work since 1991 ==
Since the dissolution of the Soviet Union, Omar Eldarov has created numerous significant works, including sculptures of Sattar Bahlulzade, as well as Muslim Mogomayev's bust, the monument to poet Huseyn Javid (1993) and the monument to Mammed Amin Rasulzade (intended for 1995, but not completed). Other notable works include sculptures dedicated to composer Fikrat Amirov, artist Azim Azimzade (2002) and singer Rashid Behbudov's bas-relief (2002). He also created monuments to poet Khurshid Banu Natavan, poet Nizami Ganjavi's bust in Cheboksary (2004) and gravestones for Zarifa Aliyeva, Heydar Aliyev, Sikh-Ali Gurbanov and Tofig Guliyev in the Alley of Honorable Burial in Baku. Additional works include the gravestone and bas-relief of Uzeyir Hajibeyov in Vienna (2005), Niyazi's bas-relief (2006), the monument to Heydar Aliyev in Nakhchivan (2006), the monument to İhsan Doğramacı in Ankara (2003), and memorial plaques dedicated to Tofig Guliyev (2006), Haydar Aliyev and academician Zarifa Aliyeva (2008).

Omar Eldarov was awarded "Gold medal" for his contribution to the development of Azerbaijani visual arts during solemn ceremonies celebrating the 65th anniversary of the Azerbaijan Artists Union. He was also awarded the commemorative medal "For Merits for Academy in Honor of the 250th Anniversary" to mark the anniversary of the Russian Academy of Arts (2007).

From 1995 to 2000, Omar Eldarov served as a deputy in the National Assembly of Azerbaijan. He is married and has three children: daughters Lala Eldarova (an art critic at the Institute of Arts and Architecture of the National Academy of Sciences of Azerbaijan) and Kamilla Eldarova (a painter), and a son, Muslim Eldarov (a sculptor and a publisher of the State Book of Azerbaijan-2002, magazine "Caspian").

In 1994, Eldarov told Azerbaijan International:

"When people see my works, the most important thing for me would be if they would become more kind and that they, too, would go out and create something beautiful. You know, 'Beauty and Kindness are sisters.'"
