= Mustafa Kemal Atatürk Monument, Baku =

Monument dedicated to Atatürk in Baku, Azerbaijan

Mustafa Kemal Atatürk Monument
- Mustafa Kamal Atatürkün heykəli
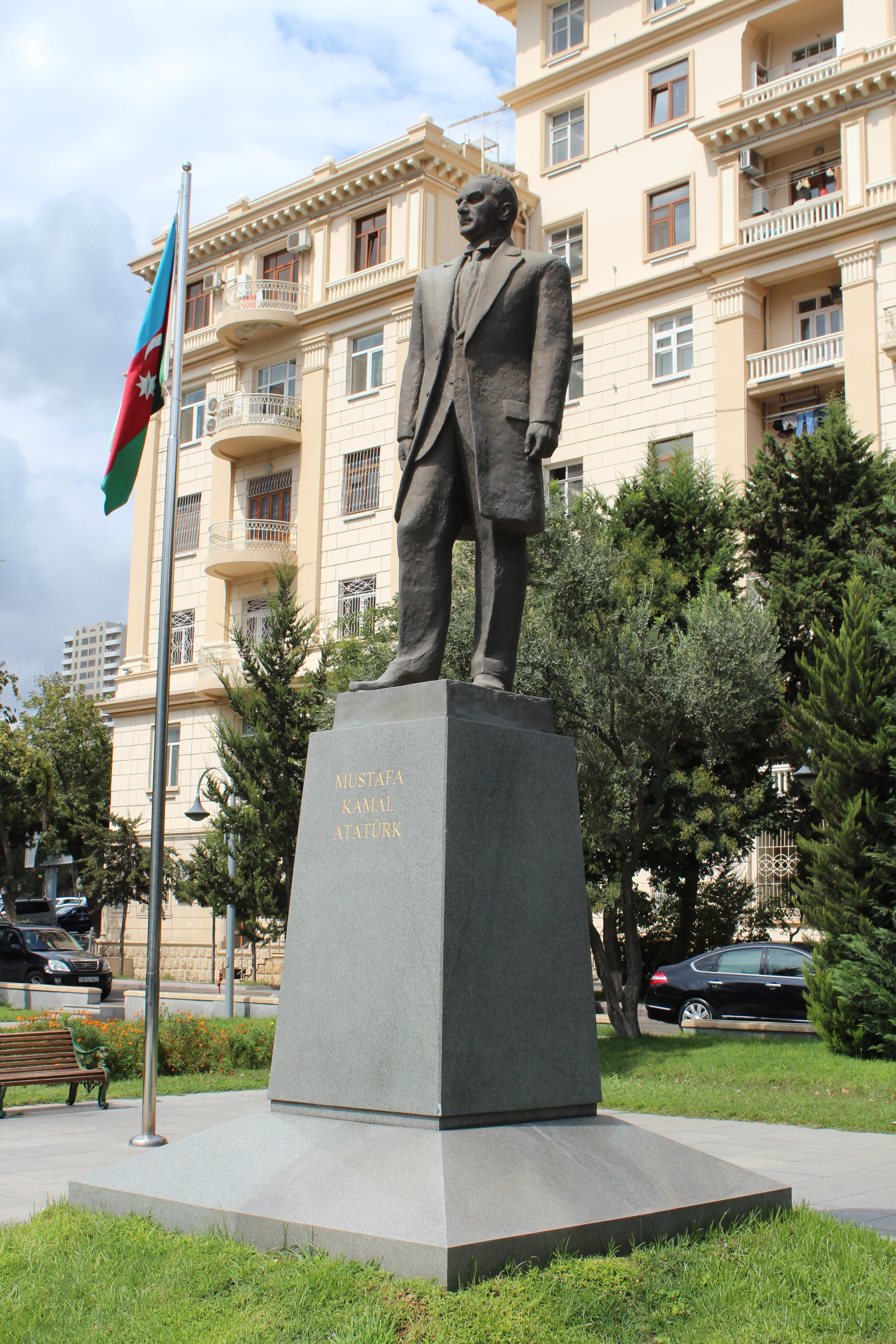
- Mustafa Kemal Atatürk Monument in Baku (September 2012)
- 40°23′22″N 49°50′12″E
- Location: Baku, Azerbaijan
- Designer: Omar Eldarov
- Type: Memorial
- Length: 10 m
- Opening date: 2010
- Dedicated to: Mustafa Kemal Atatürk

Mustafa Kemal Atatürk Monument (Azerbaijani: Mustafa Kamal Atatürkün heykəli) is a statue of former Turkish president Kemal Atatürk (1881–1938), located in Azerbaijan's capital, Baku.

== Description ==
The sculptor of the statue is People's Artist of the Republic of Azerbaijan, Rector of the Azerbaijan Academy of Arts Ömər Eldarov.

== History ==
The monument was opened on 17 May 2010 in a park on the intersection of Səməd Vurğun and Bakıxanov streets in front of the Turkish Embassy in Nasimi district of Baku. Azerbaijani President Ilham Aliyev and his wife Mehriban Aliyeva, then Turkish Prime Minister Recep Tayyip Erdoğan and his wife Emine Erdoğan attended the opening ceremony. A guard of honor was lined up in the park decorated with the national flags of Azerbaijan and Turkey.
