= List of Azerbaijani sculptors =

A list of notable Azerbaijani sculptors:

== A ==
- Hayat Abdullayeva (1912–2006)
- Fuad Abdurahmanov (1915–1971)
- Khanlar Ahmedov (born 1946)
- Huseyngulu Aliyev (born 1949)
- Natig Aliyev (born 1958)
- Akif Asgarov (1940–2023)

== E ==
- Omar Eldarov (born 1927)

== G ==
- Jalal Garyaghdi (1914–2001)

== H ==
- Huseyn Hagverdiyev (born 1956)
- Elmira Hüseynova (1933–1995)

== I ==
- Ali Ibadullayev (born 1951)

== K ==
- Samir Kachayev (1994–2016)

== M ==
- Salhab Mammadov (born 1943)
- Tokay Mammadov (1927–2018)
- Zivar Mammadova (1902–1980)
- Miralasgar Mirgasimov (1924–2003)

== N ==
- Fazil Najafov (1935–2023)

== R ==
- Vagif Rakhmanov (born 1940)
- Munavvar Rzayeva (1929–2004)

== S ==
- Fuad Salayev (born 1943)
- Gorkhmaz Sujaddinov (1932–2010)

== Z ==
- Telman Zeynalov (1931–2024)
