= Çuxuryurd =

Çuxuryurd or Chukhuryurt or Chukhur”yurt or Chukhuryurd may refer to:

- Çuxuryurd, Agsu, Azerbaijan
- Çuxuryurd, Shamakhi, Azerbaijan
