= Natig =

Natig, Natik or Natiq (Arabic: ناطق), is a given name and surname of Arabic origin that means speaking. Notable people with the name include:

== Given name ==
- Natig Aliyev (1947–2017), Azerbaijani politician
- Natig Aliyev (sculptor) (born 1958), Azerbaijani sculptor
- Natig Eyvazov (born 1970), Azerbaijani wrestler
- Natig Farajullazade (born 1960), Azerbaijani painter
- Natig Gasimov (born 1971), Azerbaijani war hero
- Natig Rasulzadeh (born 1949), Azerbaijani writer
- Natik Bagirov (born 1964), Azerbaijani-Belarusian judoka
- Natik Hashim (1960–2004), Iraqi football defender
- Natiq Gulaothi (1886–1969), Urdu poet
- Natiq Hashim (1960–2004), Iraqi footballer
- Natiq Makrani (1813–1848), Baloch writer, mystic, poet, and theologian

== Surname ==
- Saad Natiq (born 1994), Iraqi football player
