= Khojaly Genocide Memorial =

Khojaly Genocide Memorial may refer to:

- Khojaly Genocide Memorial (Baku)
- Khojaly Genocide Memorial (Berlin)
- Khojaly Genocide Memorial (The Hague)
