= Samir Kachayev =

Sculptor (b. 1994, d. 2016)

- Born: Samir Ziyaddin glu Kachayev; March 6, 1994; Çuxuryurd, Shamakhi District, Azerbaijan
- Died: April 2, 2016 (aged 22); Tartar District, Azerbaijan
- Education: Azerbaijan State Academy of Fine Arts
- Known for: sculptor
- Notable work: "Auguste Rodin", "Equilibrium", "Youth", "Shoemaker", etc.
- Awards
- Patrons: Salhab Mammadov, Natig Aliyev, Akif Asgarov, Akif Gaziyev

Samir Ziyaddin oglu Kachayev (Lekian: Самир Зияддин хва Качаев; Azerbaijani: Samir Ziyəddin oğlu Kaçayev; 1994–2016) was an Lezgin sculptor.

== Biography ==
Samir Ziyaddin oglu Kachayev was born on 16 March 1994 in the village Çuxuryurd in the Shamakhi District in Azerbaijan. In 2011, he enrolled in the Azerbaijan State Academy of Fine Arts and graduated from there in 2015. During his studies, he took part in several contests and exhibitions in Azerbaijan and in Turkey, France, and Switzerland. In 2015, he placed 2nd in the sculpture contest "Tolerant Azerbaijani Youth".

During his short art career, Samir Kachayev created such sculptures as "Auguste Rodin" (his diploma work), "Equilibrium", "Youth", and "Shoemaker". According to the honored art worker and Doctor of Philosophy Ziyadkhan Aliyev, these and dozens of other works by Kachayev are "professionally made examples of monumentality".

In July 2015, he enlisted in the Azerbaijani Armed Forces. On the night of 1 to 2 April 2016 Armenian–Azerbaijani clashes took place along the line of contact in Nagorno-Karabakh and surrounding territories. Samir Kachayev was wounded and died on the night of 1 to 2 April in Tartar District. On 5 April, a mutual ceasefire agreement was reached.

On 3 April 2016, Samir Kachayev was buried in the Malham village of the Shamakhi District. On 19 April 2016, Azerbaijani President Ilham Aliyev signed an order awarding honorary titles, orders and medals to a group of Azerbaijani military servicemen who "have demonstrated distinguished courage to support the territorial integrity of the country". Samir Kachayev was awarded with the medal For Heroism.

== Legacy ==
In May 2017, Kachayev's works were exhibited at the National Art Museum of Azerbaijan.

A monument for the work of his teacher at the academy, Rahib Garayev, was erected over Kachayev's grave.

On December 16, 2016, in the framework of the project "People's Treasure", the art album "Samir Kachayev. Sculpture" was presented. An exhibition of his works took place at the head office of Xalq Bank.

On April 5, 2017, on the stage of the Azerbaijan State Theatre of Young Spectators in Baku, the premiere of the performance "Interrupted..." took place, dedicated to the memory of Kachayev. The performance was based on the play written by Efim Abramov and Leila Begim.

== Links ==
- Samir Kachayev (1994 - 2016)
