= Monument to Nizami Ganjavi in Rome =

Coordinates: 41°54′56″N 12°28′51″E

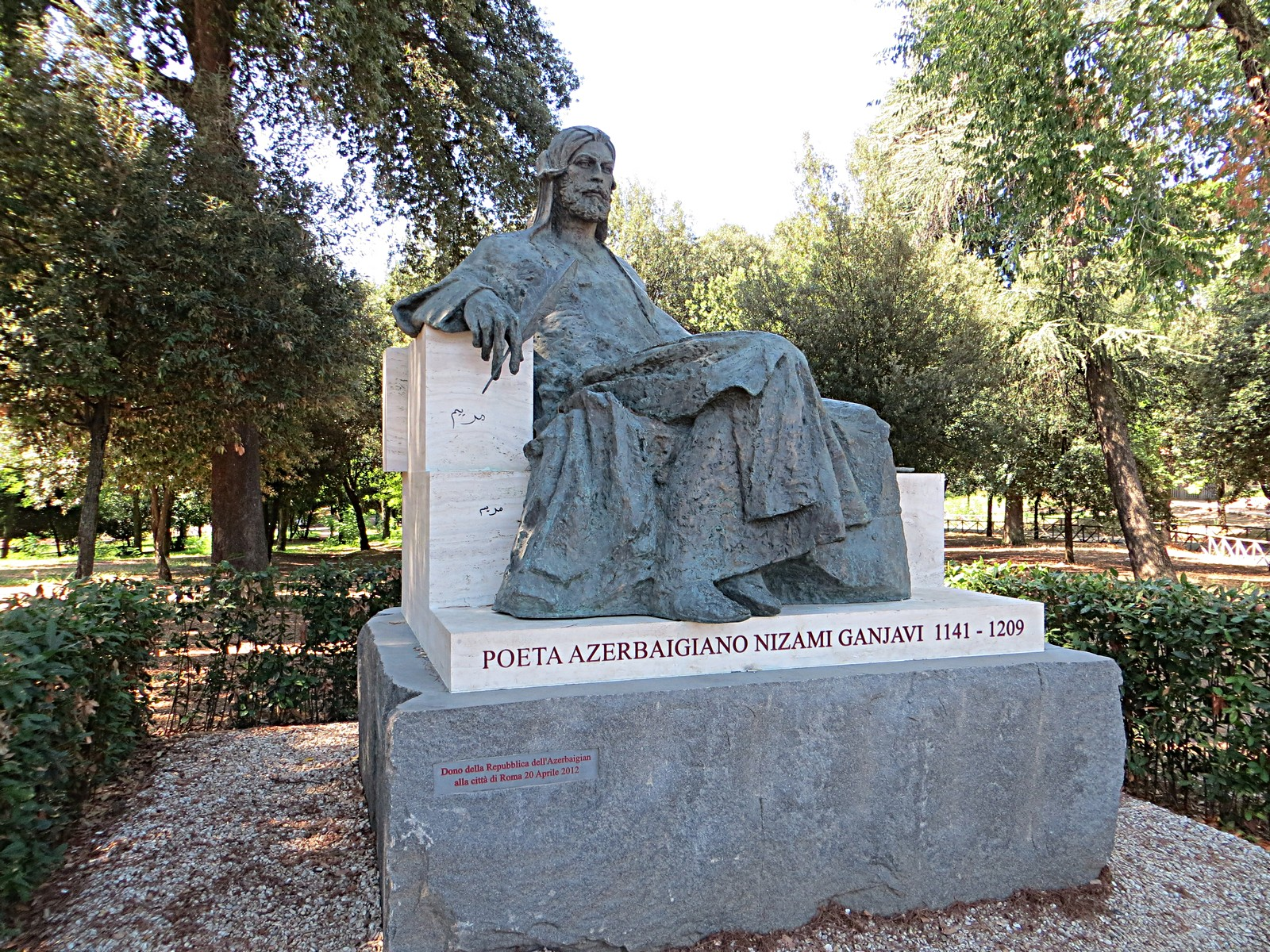
- Nizami Ganjavi's monument in the Villa Borghese monuments' park
- Interactive map of Monument to Nizami Ganjavi in Rome
- Location: Rome, Italy, Villa Borghese gardens, Viale Madama Letizia Street
- Type: Monument
- Completion date: 2012
- Dedicated to: Nizami Ganjavi

The Monument to Nizami Ganjavi (Italian: Monumento a Nizami Ganjavi), the medieval Persian poet, is located in the capital of Italy, Rome, in Villa Borghese gardens, on Viale Madama Letizia Street (Italian: Viale Madama Letizia). People's Artists of Azerbaijan, Salhab Mammadov and Ali Ibadullayev are the authors of the monument. The project was approved by The Commission on History and Arts of Rome.

== Opening of the monument ==
Opening ceremony of the monument was held on April 20, 2012 by the support of Heydar Aliyev Foundation and participation of Azerbaijani Embassy in Italy according to the direction of Azerbaijani president on June 23, 2011 “About holding the 870th anniversary of great Azerbaijani poet and thinker Nizami Ganjavi”.

Mehriban Aliyeva, the First Lady of Azerbaijan and president of Heydar Aliyev Foundation and also Serena Forni, head of the Rome City Mayor’s Office International Department, representatives of Azerbaijani Embassy in Italy, deputy minister of Culture and Tourism of Azerbaijan and others participated in the opening ceremony of the monument.

== Description of the monument ==
The monument portrays Nizami sitting with a pen in his right hand. There is an inscription on the monument in Italian, saying “Azerbaijani poet Nizami Ganjavi 1141-1209” on the monument (Italian: POETA AZERBAIGIANO NIZAMI GANJAVI 1141 – 1209). There is also an inscription on the pedestal saying “A gift from Azerbaijani Republic to Rome, April 20, 2012” (Italian: Dono della Repubblica dell'Azerbaigian alla città di Roma, 20 aprile 2012). Description was condemned by Iranian expatriates in Italy and Italian students interested in Iranian culture, who called for changing the written text as 'one of the greatest Persian poets'

== See also ==
- Campaign on granting Nizami the status of the national poet of Azerbaijan
