= Ali Ibadullayev =

Azerbaijani sculptor and painter

Ali Ibadullayev Əli İbadullayev
- Born: April 11, 1951 (age 74); Baku, Azerbaijan SSR, USSR
- Education: Stroganov Moscow Higher School of Arts and Industry
- Notable work: Monument to Nizami Ganjavi; Khojaly massacre memorial
- Style: Abstract art
- Awards: People's Artist of Azerbaijan Honored Artist of Azerbaijan
- Website: ali-ibadullayev.net

Ali Aziz oghlu Ibadullayev (Azerbaijani: Əli Əziz oğlu İbadullayev, born April 11, 1951) is an Azerbaijani sculptor and painter.

== Biography ==
Ali Ibadullayev was born on April 11, 1951, in the village of Amirjan in Baku. In 1966–1970 he studied at Azim Azimzade Azerbaijan State Art School and in 1970–1975 at Stroganov Moscow Higher School of Arts and Industry. He has been a member of Union of Artists of the USSR and Azerbaijan since 1978.

== Career ==
Ali Ibadullayev is mostly known as a sculptor. He has worked with his colleague, Salhab Mammadov, on most of the sculptures since 2006. In this regard, his "Mugam" (2009, Baku), "Monument to Farman Salmanov" (2009, Yugra, Russia), "Khojaly" (2011, Berlin), "Dervishes" (2011, Baku), "Monument to Nizami Ganjavi" (2012, Rome), "Lights of Absheron" (2012, Baku), "Monument of Azerbaijan–Poland friendship" (2013, Gniezno, Poland), "Memorial plaque to water engineer Stefan Skshyvan" (2013, Lodz, Poland), "Memorial plaque to Rasim Ojagov" (2013, Baku), "Monument to Pavel Pototsky" (2015, Krakow, Poland), "Pomegranate Monument" (2015, Goychay). His "Wind" and "Comet" sculptures, placed in front of the Museum of Modern Art in Baku, are examples of his independent works.

Abstract paintings cover a significant part of the artist's creative works. In this respect, his large-scale triptychs such as, "Mugam", "Khazar", "Volcano", "Absheron Motif", as well as "Movement", "Pink Flowers", "Flight", "Pomegranate", "Vineyard" are notable.

In 2011, Ali Ibadullayev's solo exhibition was held in Berlin, Germany. His works are kept in various museums in Azerbaijan, Russia, Germany, Canada and private collections in Spain, Italy, France, Belgium, Denmark, Sweden, Netherlands, Great Britain, Turkey, Switzerland, Japan, Algeria, USA, Venezuela and other countries.

== Awards ==
- People's Artist of the Republic of Azerbaijan — December 30, 2015
- Honored Artist of the Republic of Azerbaijan — December 29, 2006
- Prize of International Committee of the Red Cross — 1996
- "Zirva" Award — March 9, 2012

== Gallery ==
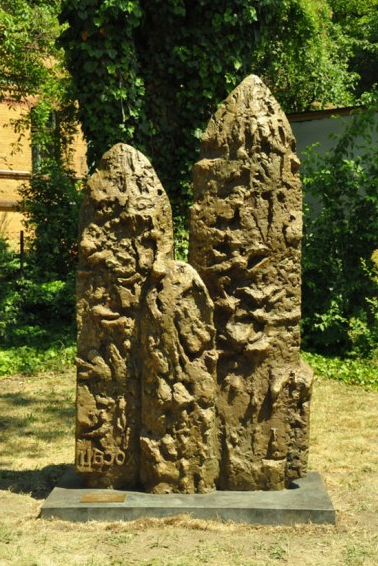
Khojaly massacre memorial in Berlin

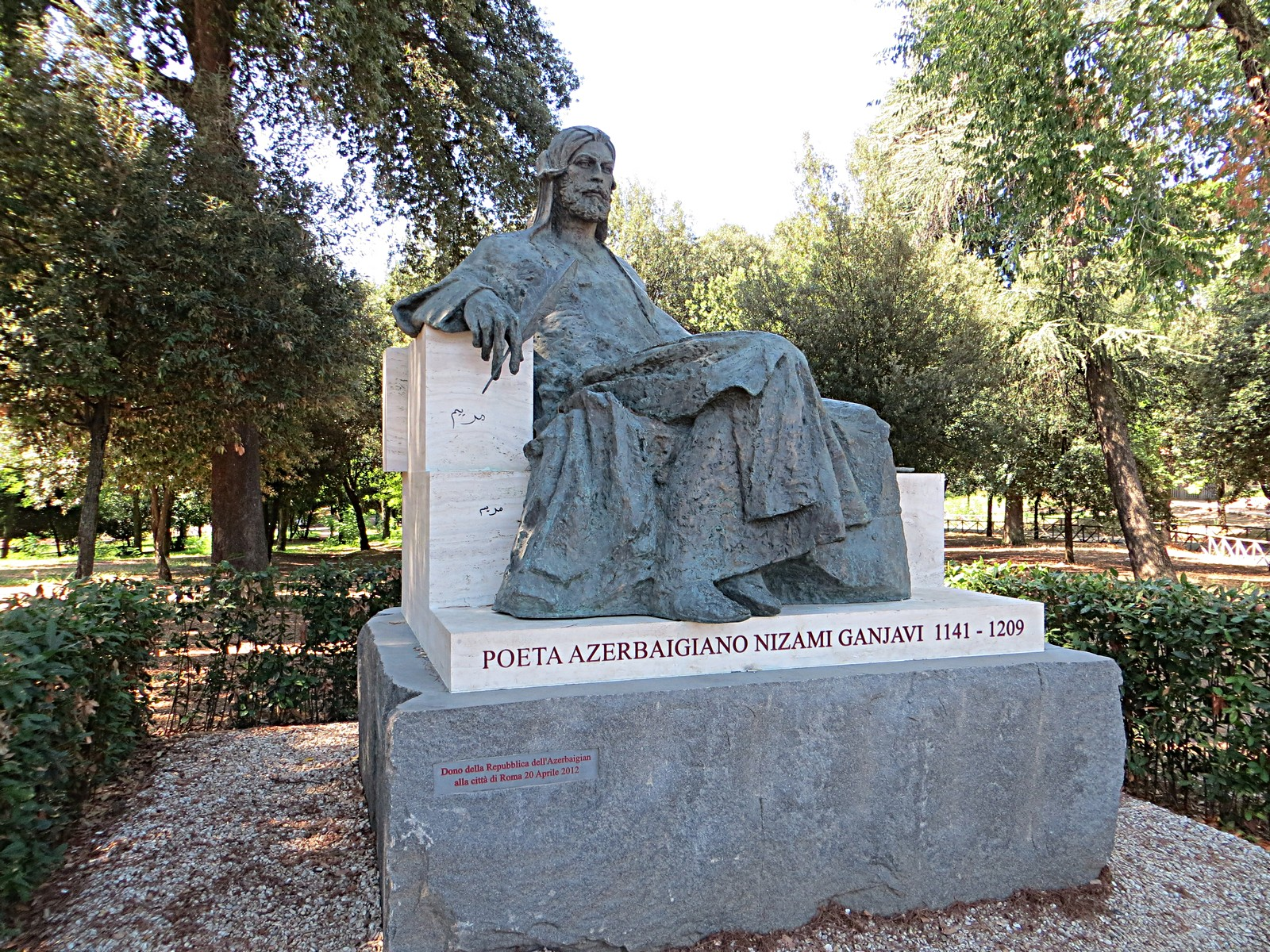
Monument to Nizami Ganjavi in Rome

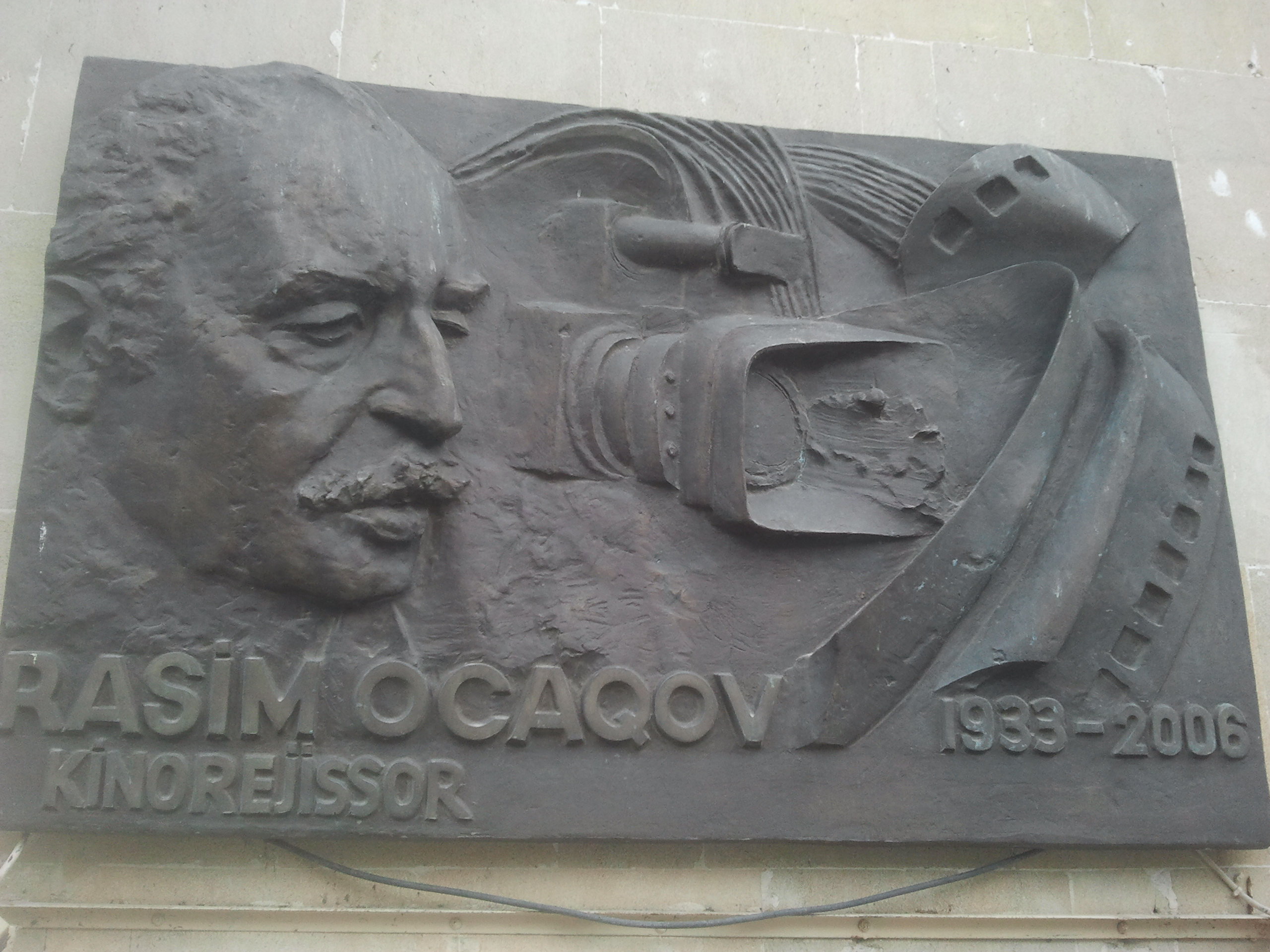
Memorial plaque of Rasim Ojagov in Baku

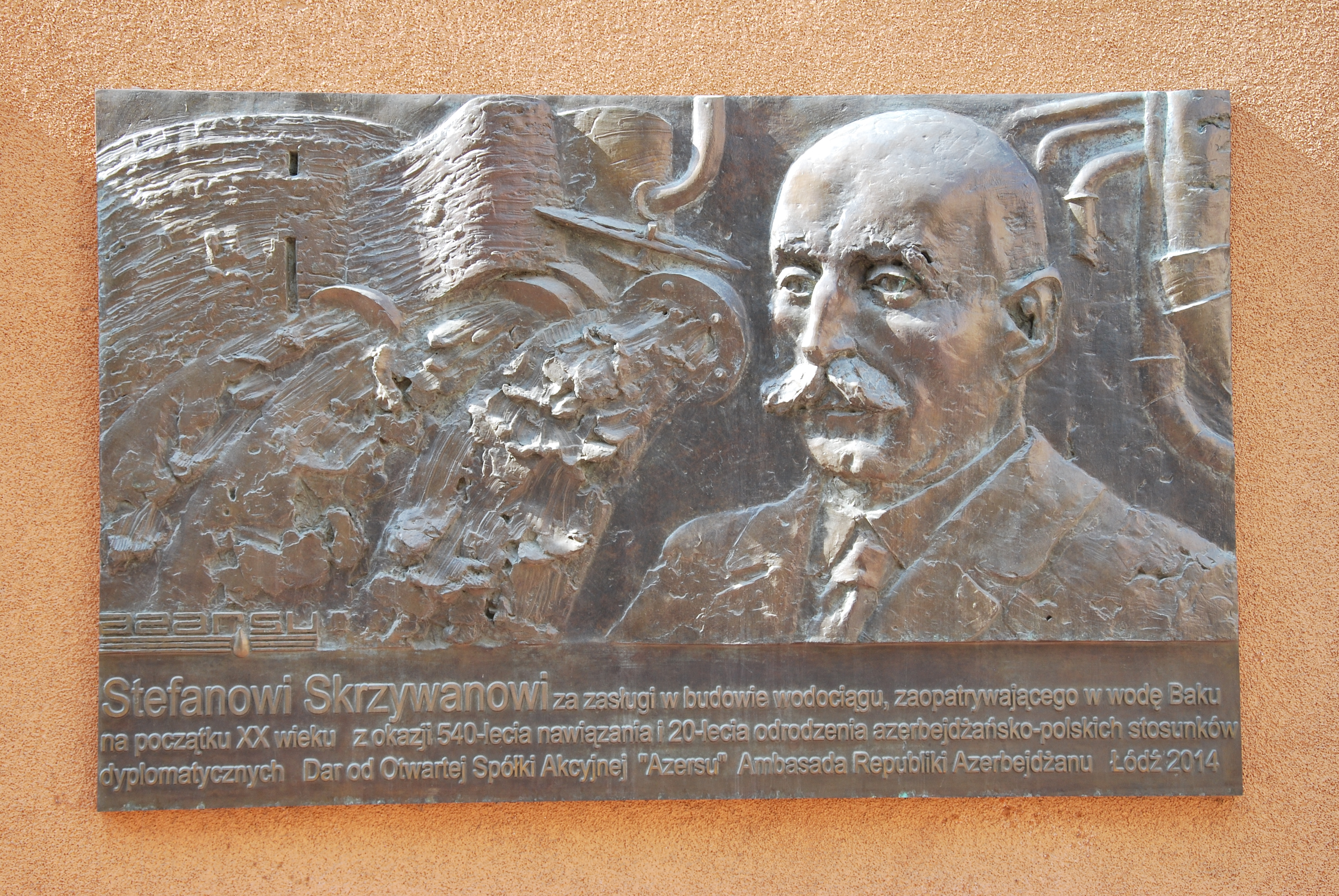
Memorial plaque to water engineer Stefan Skshyvan in Lodz, Poland
