= Aida Abdullayeva =

Azerbaijani Soviet harpist and teacher (1922–2009)

- Born: Aida Hamdulla gizi Abdullayeva; 23 April 1922; Baku, Azerbaijan
- Died: 11 April 2009 (aged 86); Baku, Azerbaijan
- Occupations: harpist, teacher

Aida Hamdulla gizi Abdullayeva (23 April 1922, Baku – 11 April 2009, Baku) was an Azerbaijani Soviet harpist, teacher, professor at the Baku Music Academy, founder of the Azerbaijan School of Harp Performance, Honored Artist of the Azerbaijan SSR (1972). She is known as the first Azerbaijani harpist.

== Life and education ==
Aida Abdullayeva was born on 23 April 1922 in Baku. In 1940, she graduated from ten-year high school and with the assistance of prominent composer Uzeyir Hajibeyov entered the Moscow Conservatory. With the beginning of the World War II, in 1941 Aida Abdullayeva returned to Baku and was employed in the orchestra of the Opera and Ballet Theater. In autumn 1942 Abdullayeva and her family was repressed and deported to Kazakhstan. Only in 1943, she with the assistance of Uzeyir Hajibeyov returned to Baku and resumed studying at the Baku State Conservatory, starting to work in the symphony orchestra of the Republic’s Radio Committee.

In 1944, Abdullayeva with the help of Uzeyir Hajibeyov returned to study at the Moscow Conservatory. She studied under the supervision of Ksenia Erdeli. In 1949, Abdullayeva graduated from the Moscow Conservatory. The same year the rector of the Conservatory offered her to start teaching harp class.

== Career ==
Starting from 1950 and until the end of her life Abdullaeva worked at the Baku Music Academy. In the 1970s Abdullayeva organized the first quartet of harpists from among her students. For over 60 years of work at the conservatory, she has trained more than 25 professionals that became laureates of various prestigious competitions.

In 1972, Abdullayeva was awarded a title of Honored Artist of Azerbaijan.

In 1985, she published a valuable textbook "Program for the class of harp in music schools".

Abdullayeva transcribed many plays by Fikret Amirov, preserving the composer’s style and the national nature of Azerbaijani music.

Abdullayeva was married to a sculptor Tokay Mammadov.

Aida Abdullayeva died on 11 April 2009 in Baku. In April 2012, Baku Jazz Center hosted an event dedicated to the 90th birthday of Abdullayeva.
