= Khojaly massacre memorials =

There are memorials around the globe dedicated to the Azerbaijani victims of the Khojaly massacre — mostly civilians, but also armed troops — by local irregular Armenian forces and the 366th CIS regiment in the town of Khojaly on 26 February 1992.

== Azerbaijan ==
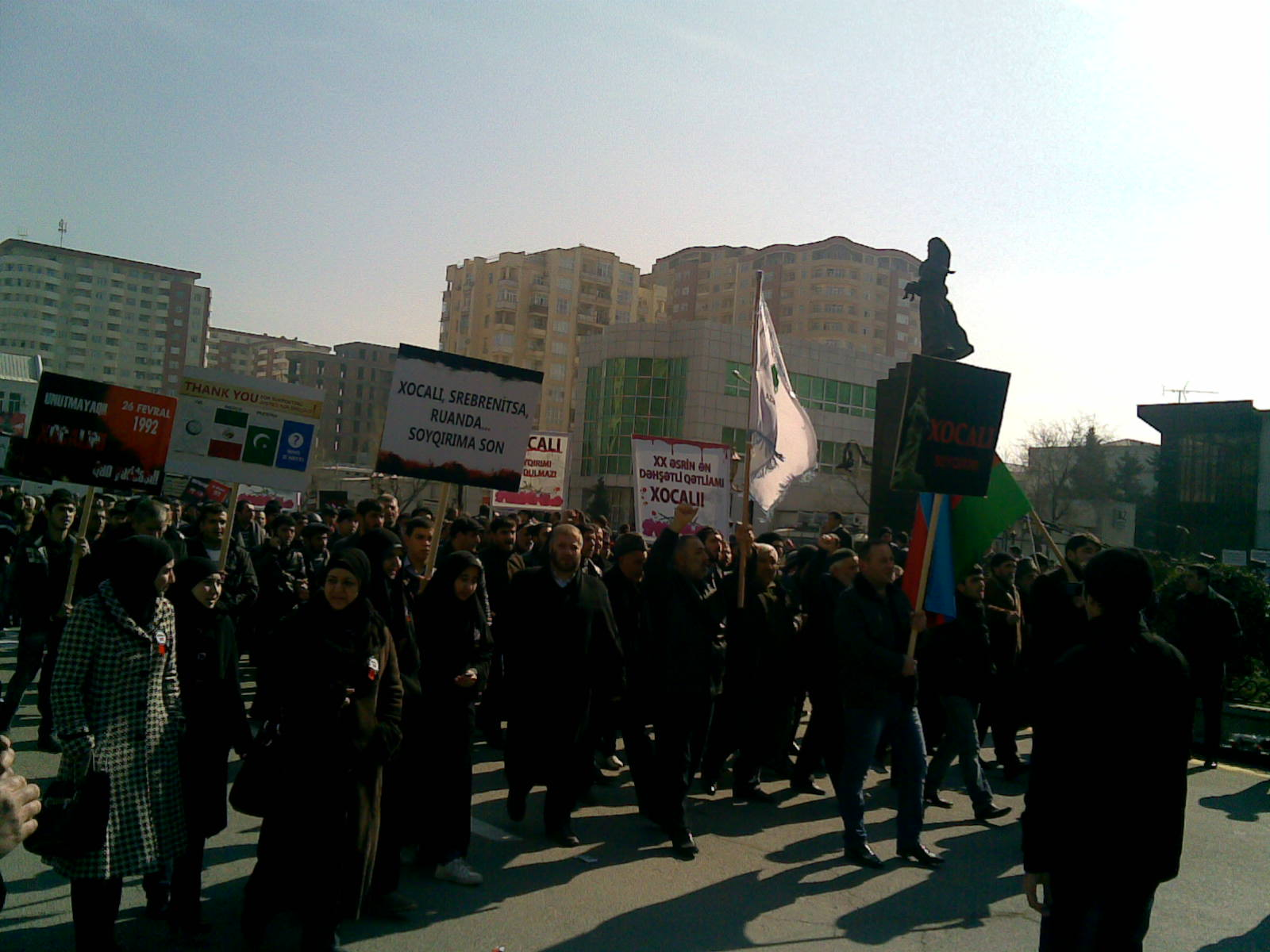
Commemoration of the 20th anniversary of the Khojaly massacre near the Khojaly Massacre Memorial in Baku, Azerbaijan

A 8.6-meters-long Khojaly massacre memorial was erected in Baku, near the "Shah Ismail Khatai" metro station, sculpted by Aslan, Teymur and Mahmud Rustamovs. The opening ceremony took place on February 26, 2008, the 16-year anniversary of the tragedy.

== Bosnia and Herzegovina ==
In February 2012, a memorial the victims of massacre was unveiled in Sarajevo, by the efforts of Leyla Aliyeva - the daughter of Azerbaijani president Ilham Aliyev and the initiator of "Justice of Khojaly" campaign.

== Germany ==
Khojaly massacre memorial
- Chodschali-Denkmal in Berlin
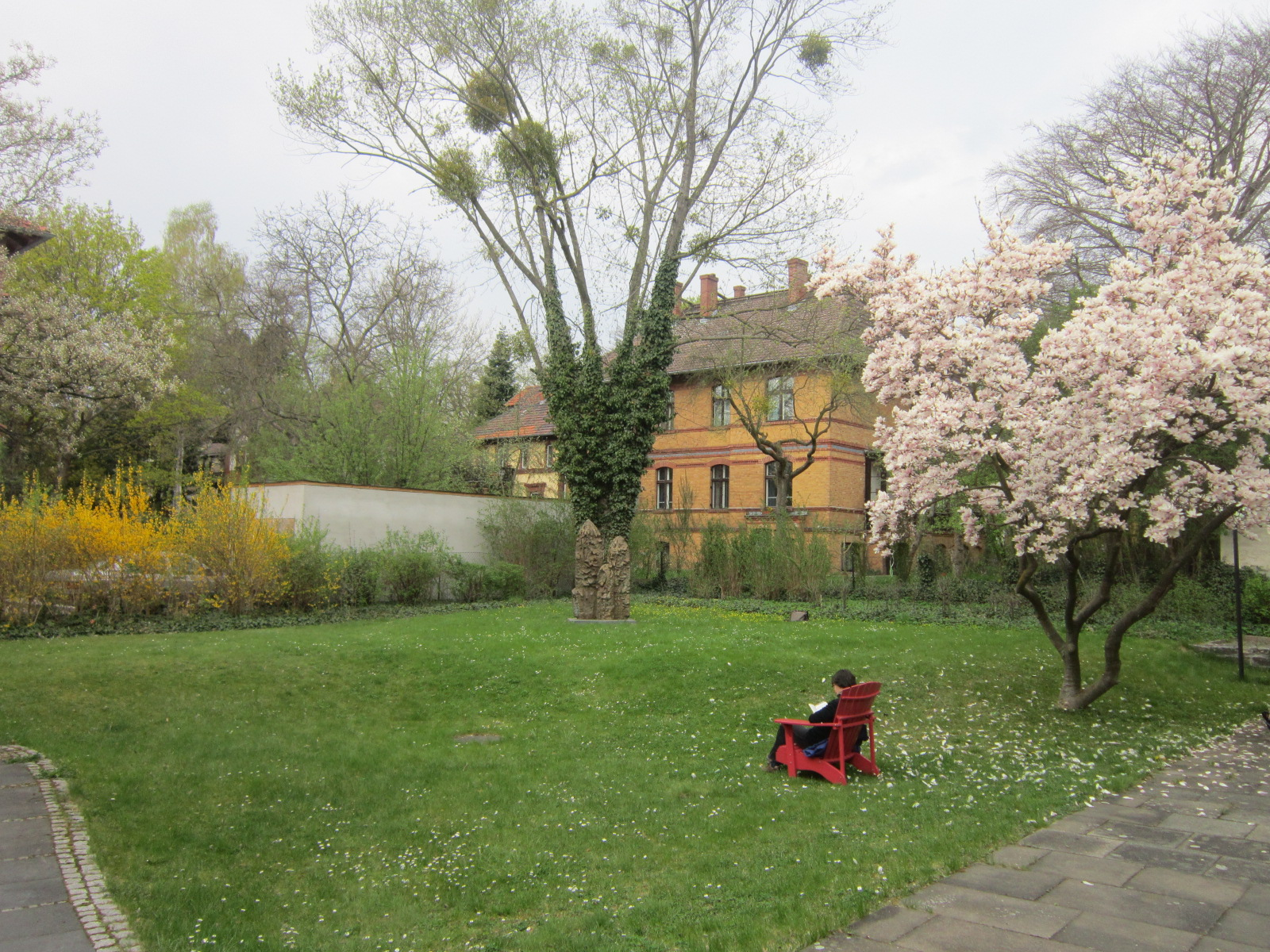
- Location: Zehlendorf, Berlin, Germany
- Designer: Akif Asgarov; Salhab Mammadov; Ali Ibadullayev; Ebrahim Ehrari
- Type: Memorial
- Height: 2 m (6 ft 7 in)
- Completion date: 2011
- Opening date: 30 May 2011
- Dedicated to: Victims of the Khojaly Massacre

The Khojaly Massacre Memorial is a public memorial dedicated to victims of the Khojaly Massacre, located near Gottfried Benn Library in Steglitz-Zehlendorf, Germany.

The idea of the monument belongs to four sculptors - Akif Asgarov, Salhab Mammadov, Ali Ibadullayev and Ebrahim Ehrari. Ehrari, who lived in Germany, found people, including state officials, who helped to establish the memorial. Azerbaijan's Ministry of Culture and Tourism also provided assistance. The opening of the memorial was postponed due to protest from the Armenian diaspora. Azerbaijani ambassador to Germany Parviz Shahbazov, who was summoned to the Foreign Ministry of Germany, explained that the monument "is not directed against a particular country", but is "against war, for peace and better relations between peoples to prevent such events from ever happening again." As a result, the permission for opening of the monument was granted.

The memorial opening ceremony on 30 May 2011 was attended by Mayor of Steglitz-Zehlendorf Norbert Kopp; Azerbaijani Deputy Minister of Culture and Tourism Adalat Valiyev; Azerbaijani expatriates and intellectuals from both countries.

The monument consists of three abstract bronze figures, symbolizing father, mother and a child and signifying hope for a peaceful future of the nations. On the pedestal there is a plate with the following inscription "Ein Geschenk für Steglitz-Zehlendorf (a gift to Steglitz-Zehlendorf).

== Israel ==
In February 2016, a memorial garden in Chaim Weizmann forest was opened in memory of victims of the massacre, by the efforts of the Azerbaijan-Israel International Association (AZIZ), with support from Heydar Aliyev Foundation (led by Azerbaijan's First Lady Mehriban Aliyeva), "Justice for Khojaly" campaign (led by Azerbaijani president Ilhams Aliyev's daughter Leyla Aliyeva) and the Jewish National Fund.

== Mexico ==
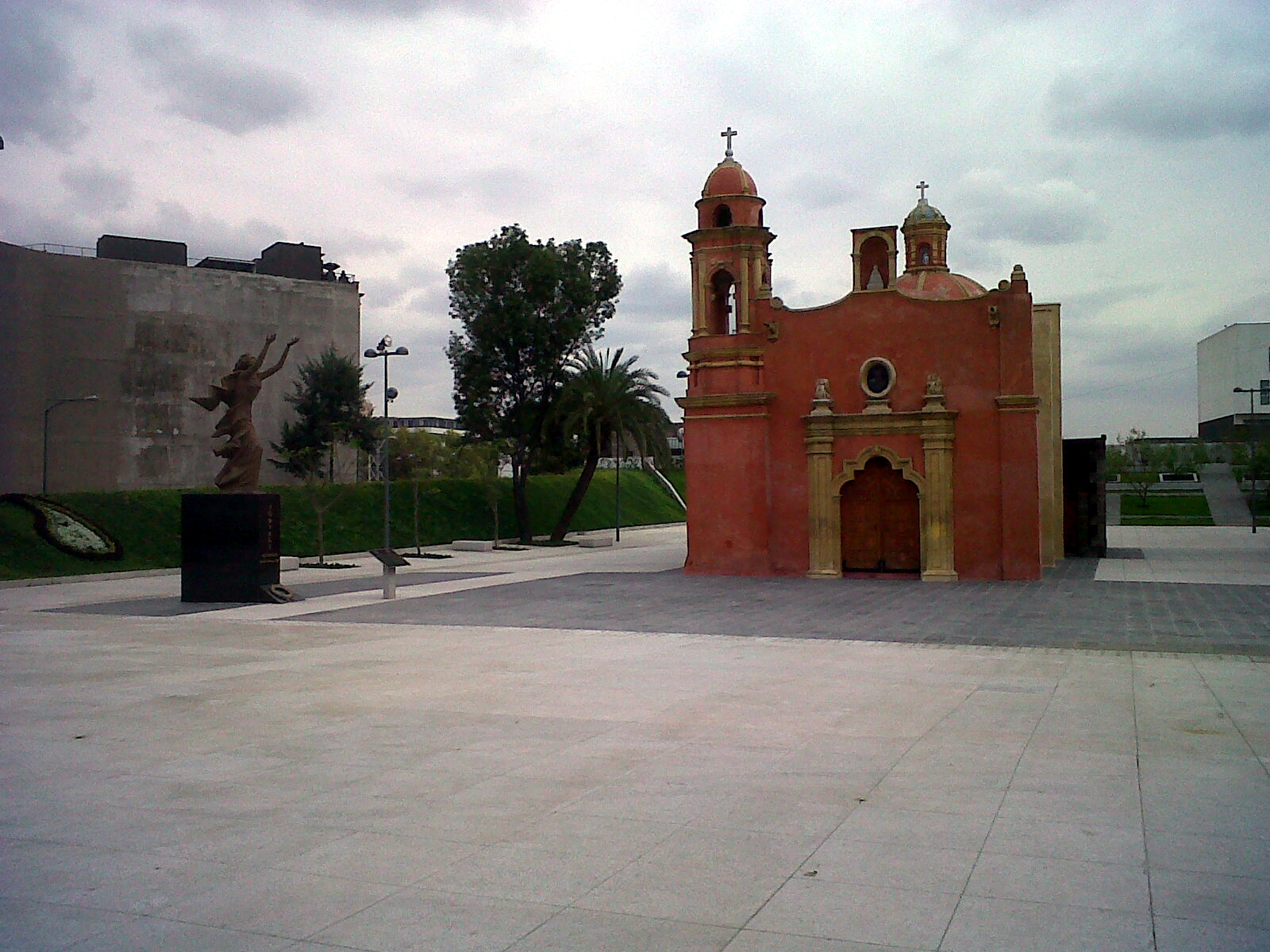
Monument to the Khojaly massacre in Mexico City (on the left)

In August 2012, a monument was unveiled in Mexico City's Tlaxcoaque square, changing the name of the square to Plaza Tlaxcoaque Jodyali.

=== Controversy ===
In November 2012, a Mexican advisory commission said authorities had erred by accepting money to allow a foreign government to decide which political figures or historic events should be commemorated in Mexico City's public spaces, adding that a plaque on the monument calling the Azerbaijani deaths "genocide" was misleading." Recommending that authorities take action, it was decided to remove substitute the word "genocide" with "massacre", together with the removal of Azerbaijan's former president Heydar Aliyev's statue from the park. The incident generated negative public image of Azerbaijan in Mexico, referring to the efforts of erecting the statue as "an authoritarian government clumsily trying to buy influence and whitewash the legacy of a dictator." Guillermo Osorno, a prominent journalist and member of a government commission appointed to study the monuments commented that “now everybody talks about Azerbaijan, but in a bad way”.

== Netherlands ==
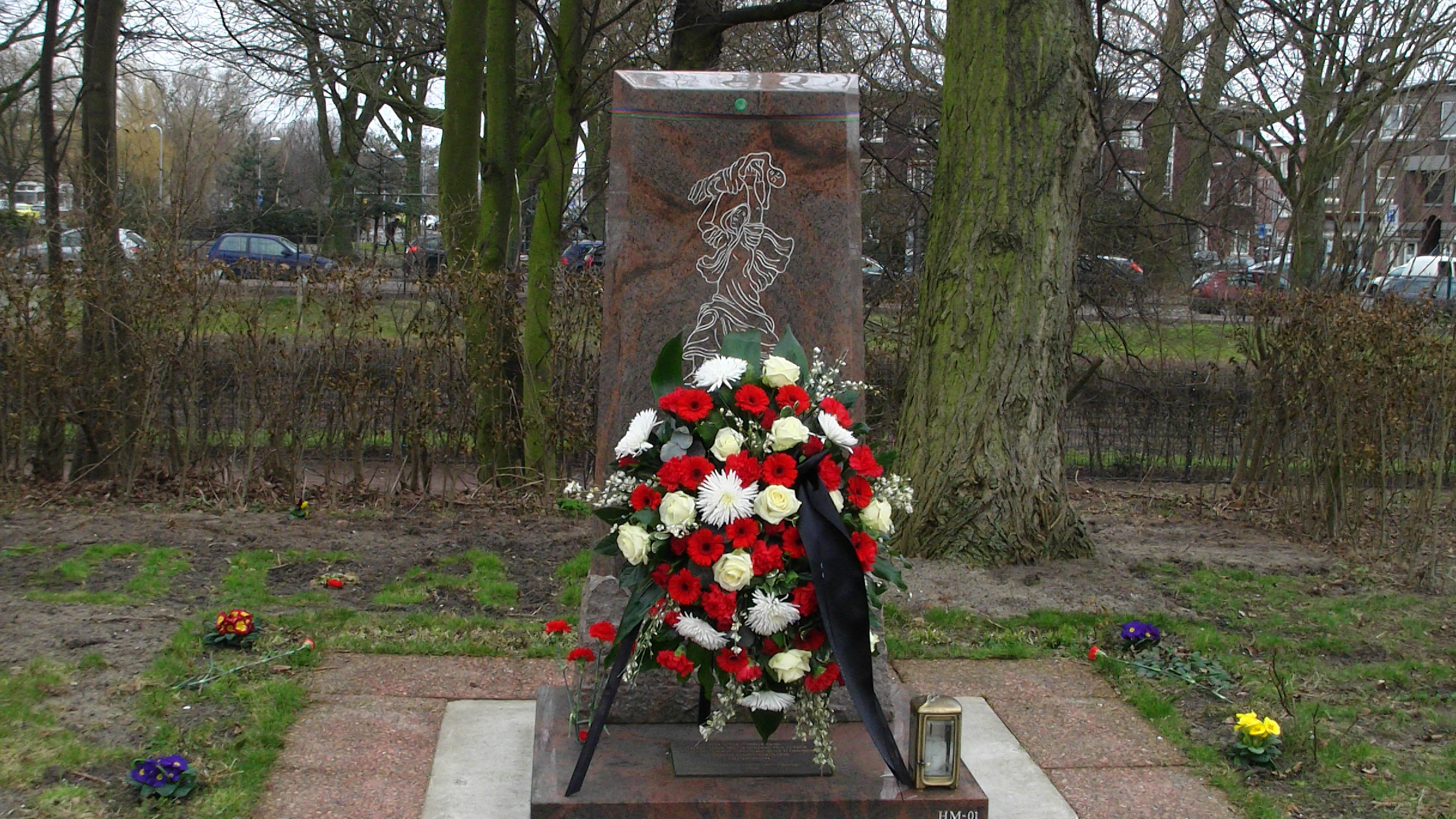
Khojaly Massacre Memorial in the Hague

Khojaly massacre memorial in Kamperfoeliestraat Park of the Hague was unveiled on February 24, 2008 at an initiative of Dutch-Azeri-Turkish Culture Association, with support from Azerbaijan's State Committee on Work with Azerbaijanis Living Abroad. The Azerbaijani ambassador to the Netherlands led the opening ceremony. The monument shows an image of a mother raising her baby above her head "to protect it from Armenian thugs", in the words of a representative of Azerbaijan's State Committee on Work with Azerbaijanis Living Abroad. The marble-made edifice is about two meters high. A large flower garden was planned around the monument located in a vast area rented for 30 years.

== Turkey ==
Another memorial was built in Ankara, Turkey. In 2011, municipalities of Turkish cities Isparta, Adana, Uşak and Çanakkale also approved proposal for a memorial to the victims of Khojaly massacre. In February 2014, the opening ceremony for the monument to the victims of the Khojaly massacre was held in Uşak. On 23 April 2015, another monument was unveiled in İzmit. In 2016, Khojaly memorial was built in Denizli.

== See also ==
- Khojaly massacre
- Khojaly massacre commemoration
