= Çuxuryurd, Agsu =

Çuxuryurd
- Location within Azerbaijan
- Coordinates: 40°29′16″N 48°25′02″E
- Country: Azerbaijan
- Rayon: Agsu
- Time zone: UTC+4 (AZT)
  - Summer (DST): UTC+5 (AZT)

Çuxuryurd (also, Chukhuryurd and Chukhuryurt) is a village in the Agsu Rayon of Azerbaijan.
