= Zivar Mammadova =

Azerbaijani sculptor (1902–1980)

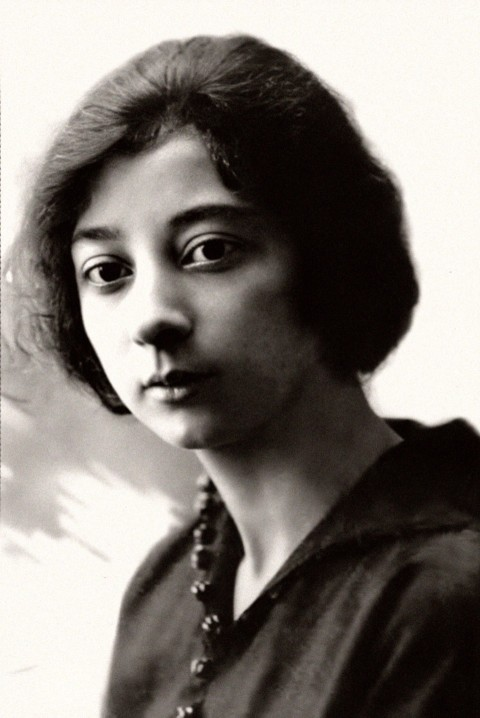
- Photograph of the Azerbaijani sculptor Zivar Mammadova in 1920s
- Born: June 14, 1902; Baku, Russian Empire
- Died: April 22, 1980 (aged 77); Baku, Azerbaijan SSR, Soviet Union

Zivar Mammadova (Azerbaijani: Zivər Nəcəfqulu qızı Məmmədova; 14 June 1902 – 22 April 1980) was the first Azerbaijani female sculptor, who worked mainly in the portrait genre.

She was a member of the Union of Artists of the USSR, and the mother of People's Artist of Azerbaijan, sculptor Tokay Mammadov.

== Life and education ==
Zivar Mammadova was born on 14 June 1902 in Baku in the family of Najafgulu Tagiyev. In 1909 she entered the Baku women's educational institution (gymnasium) of St. Nina. After graduating from the gymnasium, Zivar entered two educational institutions at the same time: the natural class of the Azerbaijan Higher Art School and the violin class of the State Turkic Music School. In 1924, she graduated from the Azerbaijan Higher Art School.

== Activity ==
She studied with the sculptor Stepan Erzya who taught Mammadova many techniques in the field of technology and ancillary work. As Mamedova later communicated to the art critic D. Novruzova, Erzya told her:

“To be a sculptor, one must be a carpenter, a locksmith, and a blacksmith… An artist should not depend on workers”.

Sometime after graduating from high school, Zivar Mammadova worked in the workshops of Stepan Erzya and Pinkhos Sabsay. She was also known as a portrait painter and created a rich gallery of portraits. In the period from 1930 to 1940, she created portrait busts of such famous personalities as Azim Azimzade, Huseyngulu Sarabski, Mashadi Azizbeyov, Idris Suleymanov, Huseynbala Aliyev, Basti Bagirova and others. In addition, she made a tombstone for Azim Azimzade in the Alley of Honour.

Zivar Mammadova was also a professional violinist. She played the violin in the State Symphony Orchestra, founded and directed by Uzeyir Hajibeyov in 1922, and was one of the main performers of the operetta "Arshin Mal Alan" in 1923. For some time she also worked as a translator at the State Publishing House of Azerbaijan “Azerneshr”.

In 1950, she created a monument to the composer Uzeyir Hajibeyov from plaster. This work went down in history as the only one, in the process of creating which, Hajibeyov posed for an artist-sculptor. Especially notable are such works created by Zivar Mammadova as "Collective Farm Woman" (gypsum, 1940), "Girl with a Doll" (decorative figurine, porcelain, glaze, 1950), "Dancer" (decorative figurine, porcelain, glaze, gilding, 1954) and other.

Zivar Mammadova died on 22 April 1980 in Baku.

== Family ==
In 1924, Zivar married Habib Mammadov. From this marriage, a daughter, Gulbeniz, and a son, Tokay, were born. Habib Mammadov in 1928-1930 studied at the Bauman vocational school in Moscow. He worked in the Council of People's Commissars as a proofreader-translator.

Tokay Mammadov was a sculptor and artist. People Painter of the Azerbaijan SSR (1973), Corresponding Member of the Academy of Arts of the USSR (1975), Honoured Art Worker of the Azerbaijan SSR (1962), professor (1977). In 1970-1972 he was the chairman of the board of the Union of Artists of Azerbaijan. Laureate of the State Prize of the USSR (1978).

== Bibliography ==
- Клюева И.В. Художественно-педагогическая деятельность Степана Эрьзи. — Саранск: Издательство Мордовского университета, 2007. — 202 с.
- Мәммәдова (азерб.) // Азербайджанская советская энциклопедия / Под ред. Дж.Кулиева. — Б.: Главная редакция Азербайджанской советской энциклопедии, 1982. — C. VI. — S. 508.
