= Telman Zeynalov =

Azerbaijani sculptor (1931–2024)

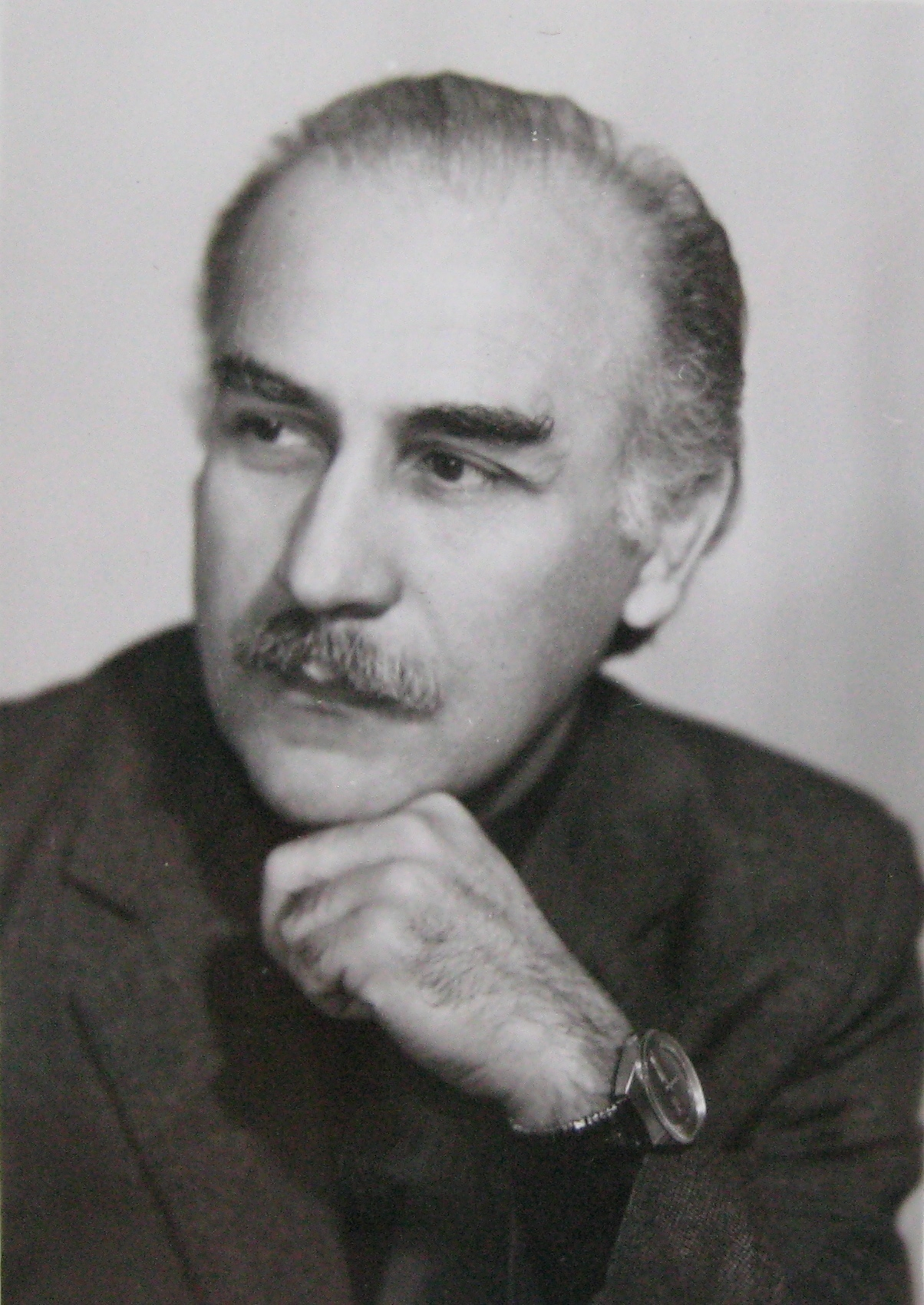
- Born: 20 October 1931; Baku, Azerbaijan SSR, Transcaucasian SFSR, USSR
- Died: 12 January 2024 (aged 92)
- Education: Azim Azimzade Art School; Leningrad Vera Mukhina Higher School of Art and Design
- Occupation: Sculptor
- Awards: State Prize of the Azerbaijan SSR

Telman Heydar oghlu Zeynalov (Azerbaijani: Telman Heydər oğlu Zeynalov, 20 October 1931 – 12 January 2024) was an Azerbaijani sculptor, Honored Art Worker of Azerbaijan (1992), State Prize Laureate of the Azerbaijan SSR (1978), Humay Award Laureate (2001), Personal Pensioner of the President of the Republic of Azerbaijan (2002).

== Biography ==
Telman Zeynalov was born on 20 October 1931, in Baku. In 1948, he was admitted to the sculpture department of the Azerbaijan State Azim Azimzade Art School. In 1956–1962, he studied sculpture at the Leningrad Vera Mukhina Higher School of Art and Design. In 1965, he became a member of the Artists' Union of the USSR. In 1977–1991, he was the chairman of the artistic council for sculpture at the Union of Artists of Azerbaijan, in 1982 and 1987, he was elected a member of the Board of Directors of the Union of Artists of Azerbaijan. Zeynalov died on 12 January 2024, at the age of 92.

== Awards ==
- State Prize of the Azerbaijan SSR — 1978
- Honored Art Worker of Azerbaijan — 4 March 1992
- Personal Pension of the President of the Republic of Azerbaijan — 11 June 2002
- Humay Award

== Works ==
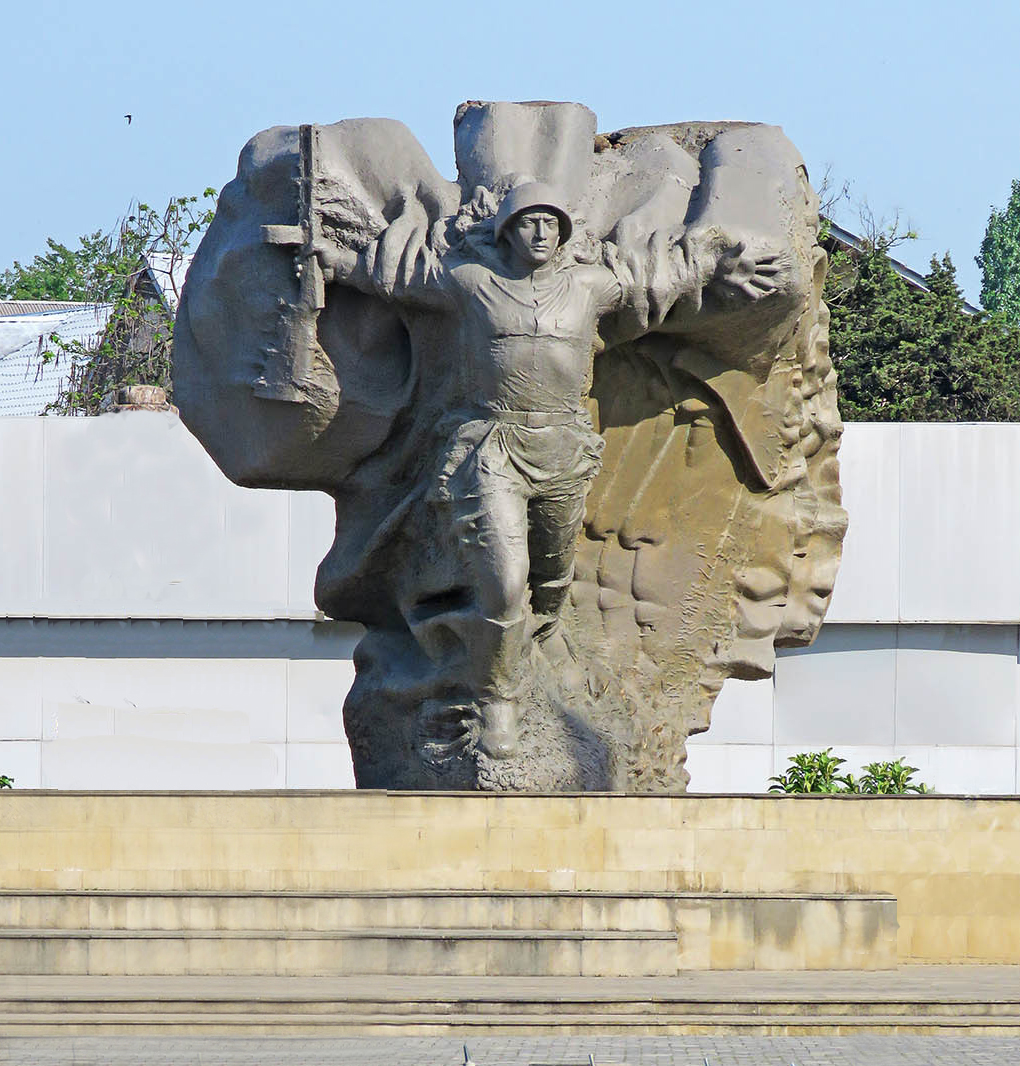
Monument to the memory of the soldiers who died in the Great Patriotic War, together with Eldar Zeynalov. (1976, Lankaran)

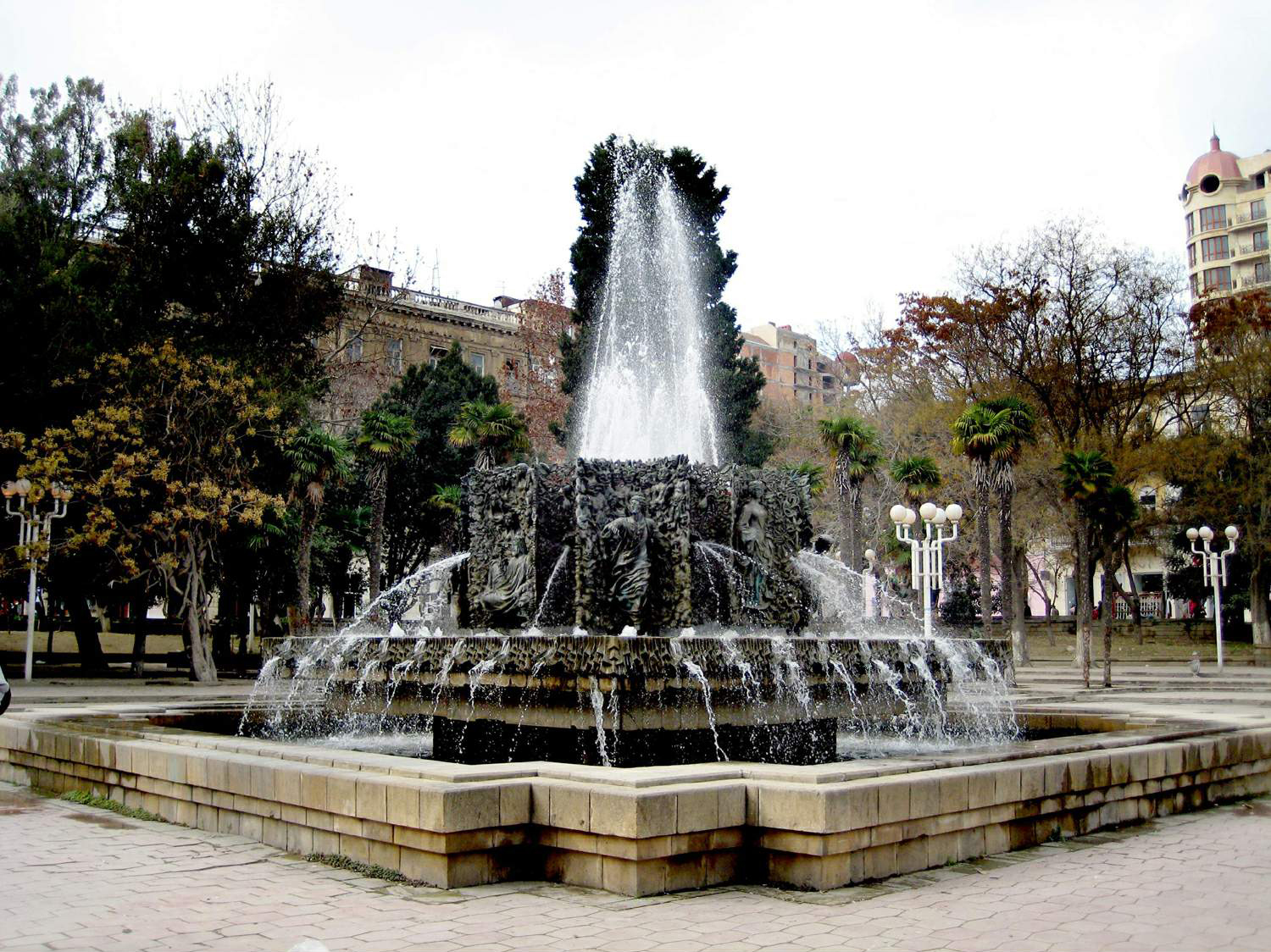
"Seven beauties" fountain–sculptural ensemble, together with Eldar Zeynalov. (1987, Baku)

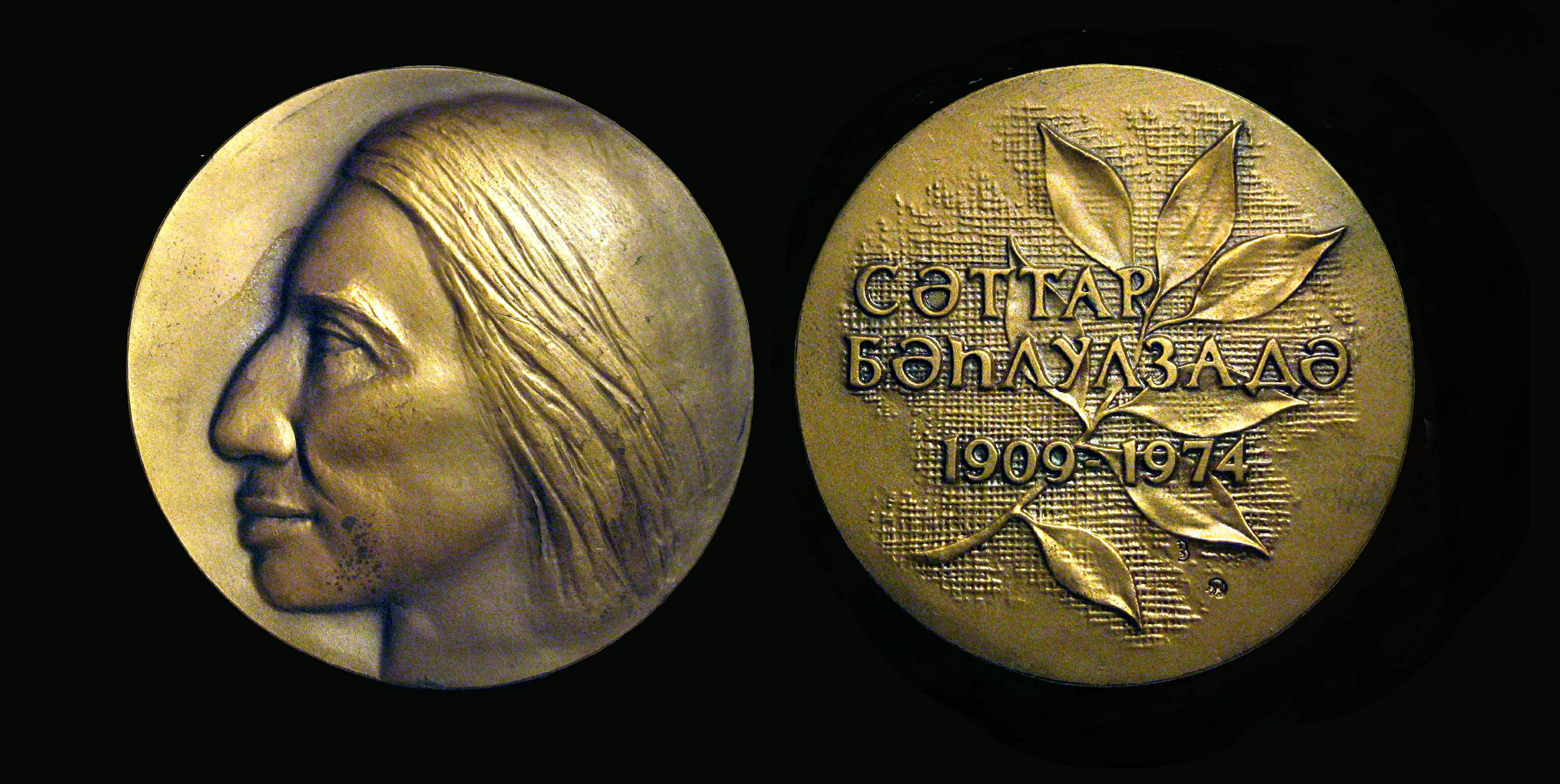
"Sattar Bahlulzade" jubilee medal, together with Eldar Zeynalov. (1992)

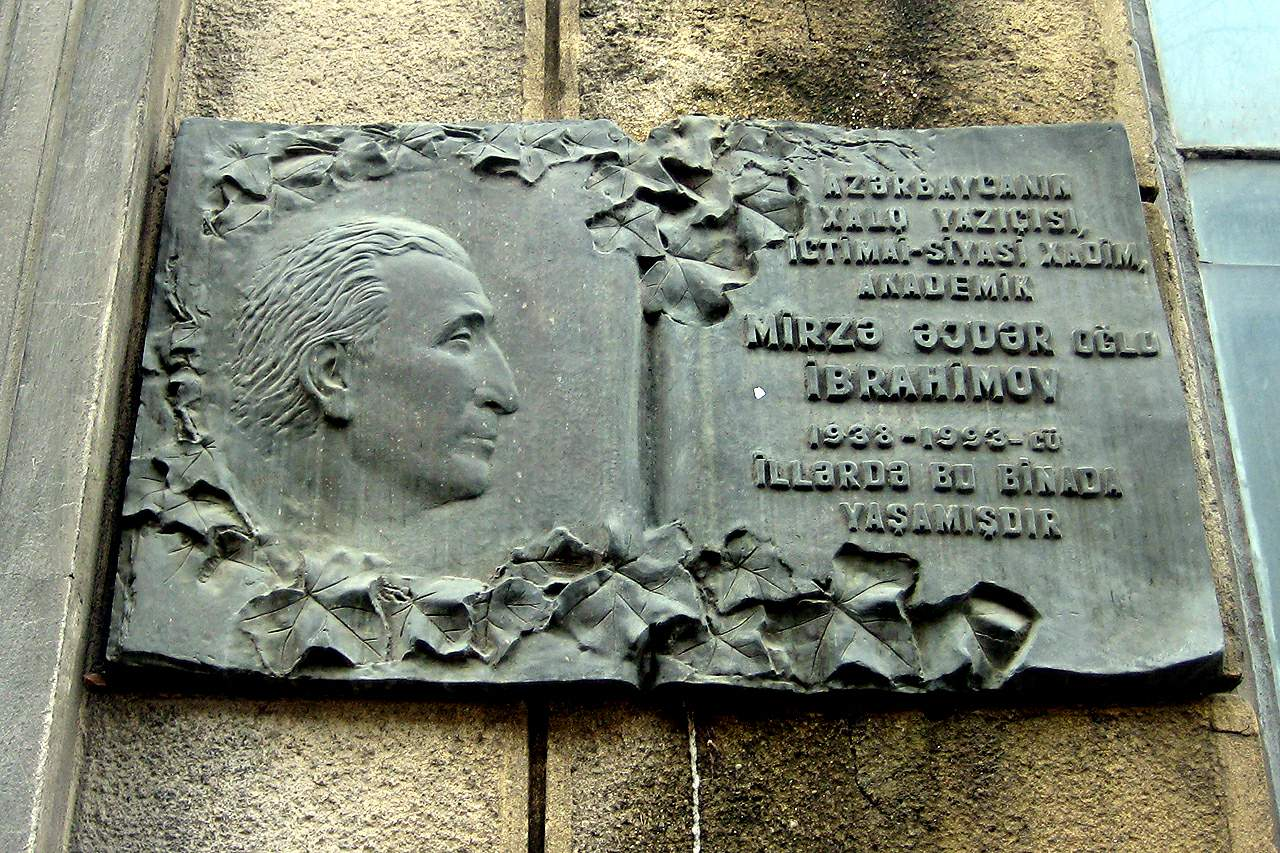
"Mirza Ajdar oghlu Ibrahimov" memorial plaque, together with Eldar Zeynalov.

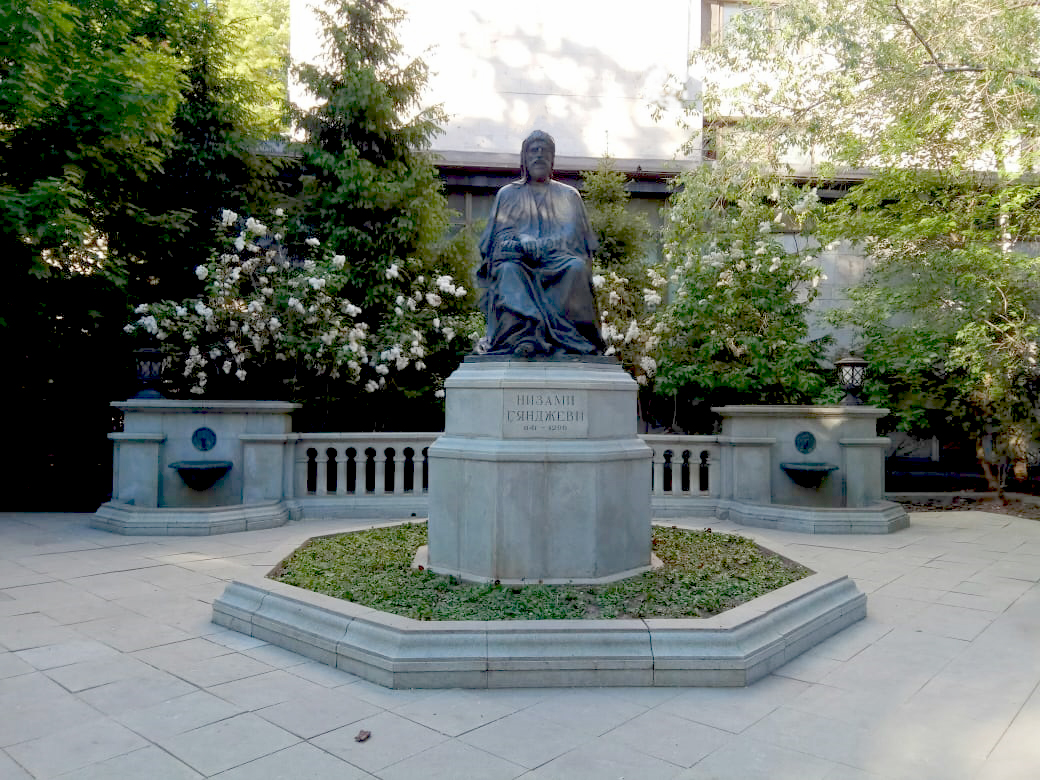
Monument to the memory of Nizami Ganjavi, together with Eldar Zeynalov. (1991, Moscow)

== Sources ==
- "11.6. ИЗОБРАЗИТЕЛЬНОЕ И ДЕКОРАТИВНО-ПРИКЛАДНОЕ ИСКУССТВО 11.6.1. Изобразительное искусство". Azərbaycan Milli Ensiklopediyası.
- "Монумент в Ленкорани".
