= Sinop University =

Public university in Sinop, Turkey

- Sinop Üniversitesi
- Established: 2007
- Location: Sinop, Turkey
- Website: Official website

Sinop University (Turkish: Sinop Üniversitesi) is a university located in Sinop, Turkey. It was established in 2007.
