= Natig Aliyev (sculptor) =

Azerbaijani sculptor

Natig Aliyev Natiq Əliyev
- Born: August 10, 1958 (age 67); Baku, Azerbaijan SSR, USSR
- Education: Saint Petersburg Academy of Art
- Occupation: sculptor
- Awards

Natig Kamal oghlu Aliyev (Azerbaijani: Natiq Kamal oğlu Əliyev, born August 10, 1958) is an Azerbaijani sculptor, professor, honorary member of the Russian Academy of Arts (2008), People's Artist of Azerbaijan (2005). Rector of Azerbaijan State Academy of Fine Arts.

== Biography ==
Natig Aliyev was born on August 10, 1958, in Baku. In 1974–1978, he studied at the Azim Azimzade State Art School and graduated with honors. In 1978–1983, he studied at the Saint Petersburg Academy of Art, graduated with honors. In 1980–1983, he was a Lenin scholar.

He is a professor at the Azerbaijan State Academy of Fine Arts, head of the workshop at the sculpture department, and chairman of the artistic-methodical council of the academy.

By the order of President Ilham Aliyev dated February 15, 2023, he was appointed the rector of the Azerbaijan State Academy of Fine Arts.

== Awards ==
- Winner of the Republic Youth Award – 1989
- Honored Artist of Azerbaijan
- Soltan Mahammad Award – 2000
- People's Artist of Azerbaijan – December 28, 2005
- Zirva Award – 2008
- Decoration of Honour for Services to the Republic of Austria – 2015
- Shohrat Order – August 9, 2018
