= Huseyngulu Aliyev =

Azerbaijani painter (born 1949)

Huseyngulu Aliyev Hüseynqulu Əliyev
- Born: February 3, 1949 (age 77); Bist, Ordubad, Nakhichevan ASSR, Azerbaijan SSR, USSR
- Occupations: painter, sculptor
- Awards: Honored Artist of Azerbaijan

Huseyngulu Ali oghlu Aliyev (Azerbaijani: Hüseynqulu Əli oğlu Əliyev, born February 3, 1949) is an Azerbaijani painter and sculptor, People's Artist of Azerbaijan (2002).

== Biography ==
Huseyngulu Aliyev was born on February 3, 1949, in Bist village of Ordubad district. In 1971–1975, he studied at the Baku Azim Azimzade Art School, in 1977–1982, at the Faculty of Applied Decorative Arts of the Azerbaijan State Art Institute.

In 1982–1988, he worked at the Nakhchivan State Art Gallery. Since 1988, he has been working as the chief artist of the Nakhchivan State Musical Dramatic Theatre. Currently, he is the head of the department at Nakhchivan State University.

Since 1986, he has been a member of the Union of Artists of Azerbaijan.

== Awards ==
- Honored Art Worker of the Nakhichevan ASSR – 1988
- Honored Artist of Azerbaijan – October 9, 1999
- People's Artist of Azerbaijan – May 30, 2002
