= Tokay Mammadov =

Soviet and Azerbaijani sculptor (1927–2018)

Tokay Məmmədov
- Born: Tokay Habib oglu Mammadov; July 18, 1927; Baku, Azerbaijan SSR
- Died: May 2, 2018 (aged 90); Baku, Azerbaijan
- Known for: sculptor-monumentalist
- Awards: USSR State Prize (1978), State Premium of the Azerbaijan SSR (1982), “Shohrat” Order(2002) etc.

Tokay Habib oglu Mammadov (Azerbaijani: Tokay Həbib oğlu Məmmədov; July 18, 1927, Baku, Azerbaijan SSR – May 2, 2018, Baku, Azerbaijan) was the eminent sculptor-monumentalist of Azerbaijan, People's Artist of the Azerbaijan SSR (1973), corresponding member of the USSR Academy of Arts (1975), Honored Arts Worker of the Azerbaijan SSR (1962), Professor (1977). In 1970-1972's he was a chairman of the Union of Artists of Azerbaijan and was the corresponding member of the Russian Academy of Arts.

== Life and education ==
He was the son of the first woman-sculptor of Azerbaijan, Zivar Mammadova and Habib Mammadov, candidate of technical sciences. After getting secondary education, Tokay Mammadov entered Baku Technical School of Arts and in the third year, in 1945, he was accepted to the sculpture faculty of Saint Petersburg State Academic Institute of Arts, Sculpture and Architecture named after I.E.Repin.

In 1951, he graduated from the Institute of Arts, Sculpture and Architecture named after I.E.Repin. He studied at such great masters as Aleksandr Matveyev, Mikhail Kerzin and Veniamin Pinchuk. He was conferred the USSR State Prize (1978) for a monument to Meshadi Azizbekov in Baku (1977). He was given the State Premium of the Azerbaijan SSR (1982) for sculptural monument to the XI Caucasian Red Army in Baku (1980). He was conferred a silver medal of the USSR Academy of Arts for a monument to Fuzuli in Baku (1962).

== Art ==
Among his main works are: bronze busts to veterans of war, Adil Guliyev - Hero of the Soviet Union, N.Shaverdyayev, Bahaddin Mirzoyev, S.Ahmadov – Hero of Socialist Labour (USSR)(all in 1985); sculptural portrait of Samad Vurgun (1987), a monument to Nasimi (together with Ibrahim Zeynalov ) (1979).

Tokay Mammadov was one of the first Azerbaijani sculptors who began to work with wood, and since then, it became his favourite material. Jamil Novruzov - one of the eminent art critics of Azerbaijan describes Mammadov's work as follows:

He created great Nizami’s portrait and a lofty, intellectual, complex and spiritually rich world of the poet of wood. Wisdom of a human can be read from manly features, tiredly covered with eyelids eyes and frowns of Nizami.

For a time, he lived and worked in Baku and was a head of a department in the Azerbaijan State Academy of Arts. During these decades, he trained pleiad of young and talented specialists. He was married to Aida Abdullayeva – Honoured Artist of Azerbaijan, a grand granddaughter of Arablinski. According to the order of Ilham Aliyev – the President of Azerbaijan, he became a member of the Heraldry Council of the President of the Republic of Azerbaijan, since February 7, 2006. He was conferred a memorial medal “For great services to the Academy in honor of the 250th anniversary” in honor of the 250th anniversary of the Russian Academy of Arts.

== Awards ==
- The USSR State Prize (1978)
- State Premium of the Azerbaijan SSR (1982)
- “Shohrat” Order (Azerbaijan) (2002)
- Silver Medal of the USSR Academy of Arts (1958)
- “For great services to the Academy in honor of the 250th anniversary” (Russia) (2007)
- Medal named after academician Yusif Mammadaliyev (“Bilik” (“Knowledge”) center of enlightenment, culture and information) (2007)
