= Akif Asgarov =

Azerbaijani sculptor (1940–2023)

Akif Asgarov Akif Əsgərov
- Born: 1 May 1940; Nakhchivan, Nakhichevan ASSR, Azerbaijan SSR, USSR
- Died: 18 November 2023 (aged 83); Baku, Azerbaijan
- Education: Ilya Repin Leningrad Institute for Painting, Sculpture and Architecture
- Occupation: Sculptor
- Awards

Akif Izzatulla oghlu Asgarov (Azerbaijani: Akif İzzətulla oğlu Əsgərov; 1 May 1940 – 18 November 2023) was an Azerbaijani sculptor and a People's Artist of Azerbaijan (2018).

== Biography ==
Akif Asgarov was born in Nakhchivan on 1 May 1940. From 1958 to 1963, he studied at the Azim Azimzade Art School, and from 1963 to 1969 at the Ilya Repin Leningrad Institute for Painting, Sculpture and Architecture.

From 1970 to 1972, he was a member of the Artists' Union of the USSR. The sculptor's works are kept in the Volgograd Art Museum, Tretyakov Gallery, museums, and private collections in France, Germany, USA, Turkey, England. On 10 February 2016, Akif Asgarov was elected an honorary member of the Russian Academy of Arts. He was a professor of the Azerbaijan State Academy of Fine Arts.

In 1997, a personal exhibition of Akif Asgarov was held in Baku.

Asgarov died on 18 November 2023, at the age of 83.

== Awards ==
- People's Artist of Azerbaijan — 27 May 2018
- Honored Art Worker of Azerbaijan — 30 May 2002
- Labor Order — 30 April 2020
