= Natig Farajullazade =

Azerbaijani artist (b. 1960)

- Born: Natiq Nadir oğlu Fərəcullazadə; 24 January 1960 (age 66); Baku, Azerbaijan SSR, USSR
- Known for: realism, modernism

Natig Farajullazade is an Azerbaijani painter and heraldic master.

== Early life ==
Farajullazadeh was born on January 24, 1960, in Baku. After graduating from secondary school, he graduated from Baku Art School in 1979. In 1984, he graduated from Azerbaijan State Art Institute. In In 2005 he became a member of the Union of Artists of Azerbaijan.

== Career ==
Farajullazadeh is mainly engaged in painting in Turkey. He was one of the creators of the artistic composition of the Disney Heroes Park in Ankara in 2003 and the author of the relief decorative composition of the Sheraton Hotel there.

"The Red umbrella girl", "The lake", "Fatigue", "Dreams", "Morning", "Librarian", "Piggy girl", "Eternal fall", "Absheron women", "Before the Martyrs", "Life and Nature", "Far on the shores", "Absheron motif", "Conversation", "Rainy day" are works that take direction of modernism from realism.

Later, heraldry became important to him. He is the creator of orders and medals of Azerbaijan. He prepared medal sketches for international sports competitions in Azerbaijan and abroad. His medal creations include "Commemorative of the Century - 20 years", "90th Anniversary of Nakhchivan Autonomous Republic", commemorative badges of "TANAP", commemorative medal of I European Games, 130th jubilee medal of Uzeir Hajibeyli, Nizami Ganjavi medal, "100th anniversary of the Azerbaijani Army (1918-2018) The jubilee medal, the 100th Anniversary of the Azerbaijan Democratic Republic (1918-2018), the Order of Rashadat, the Medal of Merit.

== Exhibitions ==
Farajullazade participated in many exhibitions. His first exhibition was the "60th Anniversary of the USSR" (Academy of Artists of the USSR), held in 1985 in Leningrad. He also participated in "The Youth of the Country" (Republican Exhibition, Baku, 1987), "Glass and Ceramics" (First Republic Exhibition, Baku, 1987), "Small Forma" (Republican Exhibition, Baku, 1988) (Museum Center, Baku, 2010), "Khojaly genocide" (Competition, Baku, 2011). Personal exhibitions were dedicated to his 35th anniversary in Istanbul in 1995, and on January 22–28, 2010, to the 50th anniversary of the Union of Artists of Azerbaijan. His works are kept in museums and private collections in Azerbaijan and abroad.
