= Salhab Mammadov =

Azerbaijani sculptor and painter

Salhab Mammadov Səlhab Məmmədov
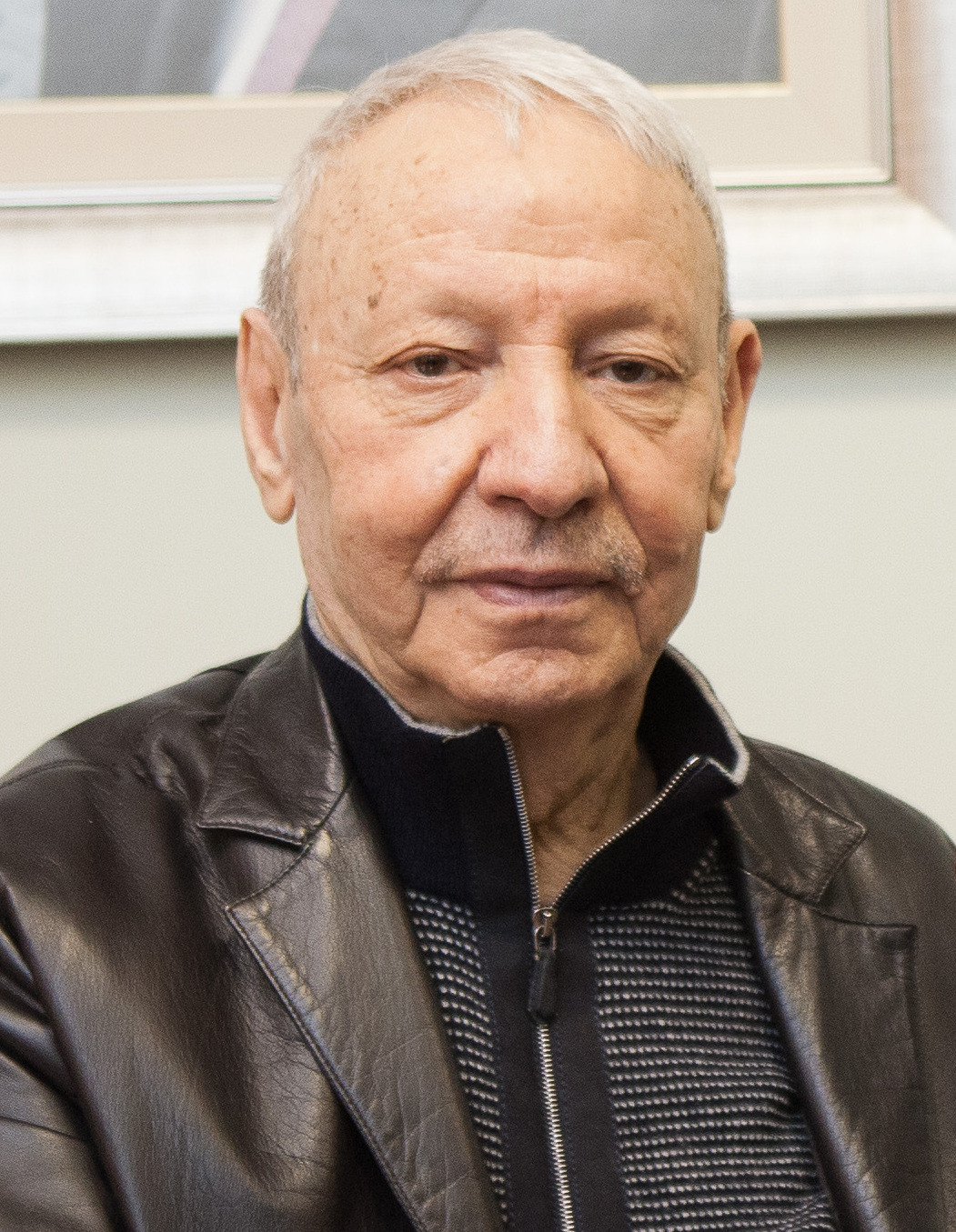
- Born: January 4, 1943 (age 83); Nukha, Nukha District, Azerbaijan SSR, USSR
- Education: Tbilisi State Academy of Arts
- Occupations: sculptor, painter
- Children: Emin Mammadov, Elkhan Mammadov
- Awards: ,

Salhab Isa oghlu Mammadov (Azerbaijani: Səlhab İsa oğlu Məmmədov, born January 4, 1943) is an Azerbaijani sculptor-painter, vice-rector of the Azerbaijan State Academy of Fine Arts, first deputy chairman of the Union of Artists of Azerbaijan, professor, People's Artist of Azerbaijan (2006).

== Biography ==
Salhab Mammadov was born on January 4, 1943, in Nukha. In 1962–1968, he studied at Tbilisi State Academy of Arts. The artist has been a member of the Union of Artists of Azerbaijan since 1970, the responsible secretary of the Union in 1982–1988, and its secretary since 1993. He is an honorary member of the Russian Academy of Arts since 2009.

Salhab Mammadov worked as a teacher at the Azerbaijan State University of Culture and Arts in 1989–1993, as an associate professor of the university in 1993–1999, as a professor of the Azerbaijan State Academy of Fine Arts since 1999, and as vice-rector for international relations of the academy since 2004.

He has repeatedly been the organizer of art exhibitions in Azerbaijan, Russian cities such as Moscow, Saint Petersburg and some foreign countries, and has been invited as a chief artist and designer. Salhab Mammadov is the co-author of the "Khojaly" monument in Berlin, Germany, the "Nizami Ganjavi" monument in Villa Borghese gardens in Rome, and the "Dostlug" monument in Gniezno, Poland. He is the author of scientific works such as "Painting in Fine Art", "Art of Painting".

== Awards ==
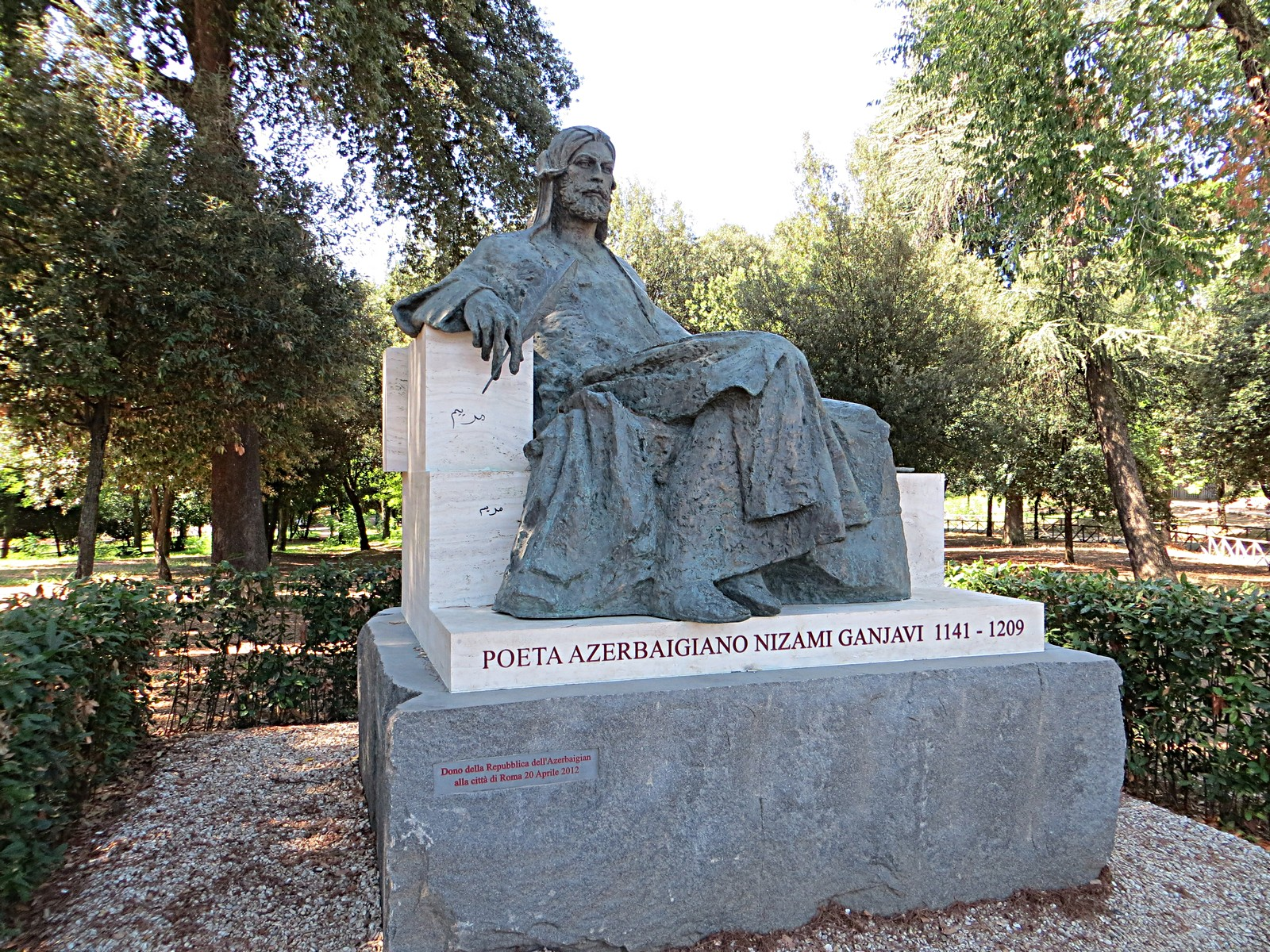
Monument to Nizami Ganjavi in Rome

- People's Artist of Azerbaijan — December 29, 2006
- Honored Art Worker of the Azerbaijan SSR — May 7, 1988
- Sharaf Order — December 28, 2017
- Shohrat Order — December 19, 2012
- Honorary Diploma of the President of Azerbaijan — January 3, 2023
