= Çuxuryurd, Shamakhi =

Çuxuryurd
- Municipality
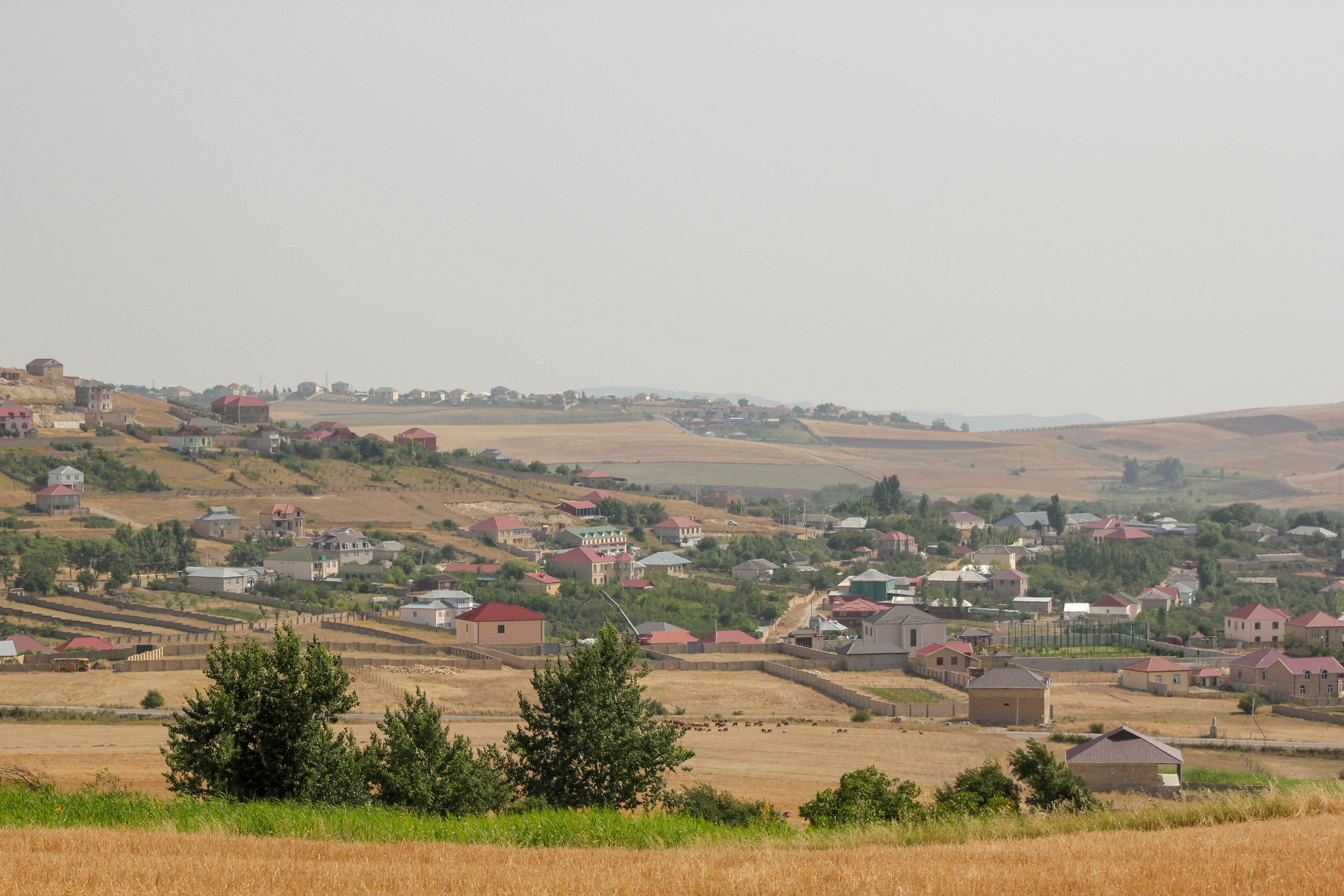

- Location within Azerbaijan
- Coordinates: 40°42′54″N 48°38′06″E
- Country: Azerbaijan
- Rayon: Shamakhi

Population
  - Total: 826
- Time zone: UTC+4 (AZT)
  - Summer (DST): UTC+5 (AZT)

Çuxuryurd (also, Chukhur”yurt and Chukhuryurd) is a village and municipality in the Shamakhi Rayon of Azerbaijan. It has a population of 826.

Near the village there is a lake surrounded by hills. In the village you can find three little shops and one "Apteka" (pharmacy).
