= Azerbaijan State Academy of Fine Arts =

Fine arts school in Baku, Azerbaijan

Coordinates: 40.3961°N 49.8733°E

Azerbaijan State Academy of Fine Arts in Baku

Azerbaijan State Academy of Fine Arts is a higher art school that is located in the city of Baku in Republic of Azerbaijan. It was founded in 2000 by a presidential decree. The academy aims the only higher education institution in the country that carries out educational programs of specialized secondary school, high school and other levels of education in accordance with the requirements of higher art education. The academy is officially accredited by the Ministry of Education of Azerbaijan. ASAFA offers courses and programs in higher education degrees, such as bachelor's degrees in several areas of study. Azerbaijan State Academy of Fine Arts prepares specialists in design, painting, theatrical and decorative arts, graphics, carpet artists, and sculpture. The academy has 102 professors and instructors, including 2 doctors of science, 13 professors, 7 candidates of science and 13 associate professors. Currently, there are more than 800 students studying at the Azerbaijan State Academy of Fine Arts. The building of academy covers is 6,500 square meters and has 128 classrooms, different subject specific rooms, laboratories and workshops.

== Faculty departments ==
- Architecture and design
- Decorative arts
- Sculpture
- Painting
- Art history

=== Architecture and design ===
In 2001, when creating the Azerbaijan State Academy of Arts, an experienced architect, a member of the Union of Architects of Azerbaijan, Kazim Alishir Agabekov was invited to the academy to create the “Architecture” department. Currently, the department "Architecture" employs 18 professors and instructors. At present, the head of the department is Mamedova Gular Gulaga gizi.

Currently, 42 students are studying in the major "Architecture". The main purpose of the department of architecture is to prepare students for high-level design specialties, professional architecture and interiors that meet modern requirements.

=== Decorative arts ===
The Faculty of Decorative and Applied Arts operates in accordance with the decision of the Ministry of Education of the Republic of Azerbaijan dated July 12, 2013. The faculty has a bachelor's and master's degree in the major -"Decorative Art" which includes carpet art, textiles art, ceramics art, metal art, glass art).

In the 2017/2018 school year, the teaching staff of the faculty was consisted of 21 people. The faculty is formed of 2 departments - "The Art of Textile and Carpet Art" and "The Art of Ceramics, Glass and Metal Art." There are 3 professors, 7 associate professors, 11 senior teachers, and 4 instructors in the workshops. Currently, 228 students are studying for a bachelor's degree, and 17 students for a master's degree.

=== Paintings ===
The faculty includes 3 majors: "Graphics", "Drawing" and "Sculpture". The duration of education at is 4 years for a bachelor's degree and 1.5 years for a master's degree. At this faculty, there are 4 departments: "Painting", "Graphics", "Academic painting and composition" and "Sculpture".

== History ==
The academy initially established in 2000 in because of the absence of any higher art school in the republic after the collapse of USSR. The Russian Academy of Arts was taken as the basic model of the Azerbaijan State Academy of Arts so that they still have close relations. It considered as the first time in Azerbaijan an art academy has brought together gathered almost all artistic and creative elites of the country.

== Collaborating universities ==
The academy has built relationships with the following universities;

- Mimar Sinan Fine Arts University
- Hacettepe University
- Dicle University
- Uludag University
- Sinop University
- Novosibirsk State Architectural and Art Academy
- Ural State Academy of Architecture and Arts
- Art Academy of Latvia
- Girne American University of the Turkish Republic of Northern Cyprus
- Near East University
- Uzbekistan National University of Arts and Design
- Helwan University
- Bucharest National University of Arts
- Weißensee Academy of Art Berlin
- Tbilisi State Academy of Arts

== See also ==
- List of universities and colleges in Azerbaijan
