= List of Mirza Kadym Irevani's works =

Mirza Gadim Irevani's works exhibited in National Art Museum of Azerbaijan.

The creative heritage of the 19th century Azerbaijani artist Mirza Kadym Irevani includes portraits, paintings-stencils, wall paintings, jewelry and paintings on glass. Museums of only three countries - Azerbaijan, Georgia and Russia - have Irevani's works in their collections. The main source used in the compilation of the following list is "XIX Century Artists: Mirza Gadim Iravani and Mir Mohsen Navvab" (Russian: "Художники XIX в. Мирза Кадым Еривани и Мир Мохсун Навваб»"), written by Natalya Miklashevskaya and published in the collection "Azerbaijan Art" (Baku, 1954) was an article. The article provides information about 23 works of Irevani, twenty of which are kept in the National Art Museum of Azerbaijan, two in the Hermitage, and one in the Art Museum of Georgia. The article also confirms the presence of Irevani's signature on several large portraits painted for the Palace of Sardar in Yerevan in the 1950s and currently stored in the Art Museum of Georgia.

== Siyahı ==
Work	Name	Technique / Size (cm)	Gallery	Description
	«Flowers and Birds»		National Art Museum of Azerbaijan, Baku	This drawing-stencil is the patterned part of the vertical frame. The central medallion is shaped like an arrow. the image is in the form of a stylized plant branch. Small birds are placed between the roses on the branch and the hips. The composition of the bouquet was made taking into account the shape of the medallion, and according to Miklashevskaya, it ensures the delicacy and harmony of this bouquet.
	«Rose and swallow»		National Art Museum of Azerbaijan, Baku	Although this stencil depicts roses and a swallow in a medallion, as in the "Flowers and Birds" painting, the flowers that make up the bouquet have a different appearance. In this painting, Irevani has replaced her hips with large lilies, and on the lower left side is a flower reminiscent of a sunflower. A swallow is depicted on the top of the bouquet. Harmony, well-crafted delicate composition are the characteristic features of the medallion.
	«Roses and pheasant»		National Art Museum of Azerbaijan, Baku	This drawing-stencil is drawn on oblong paper. The composition is arranged vertically (of fuchsia, tulip and rose hips) reminiscent of the edges of a vase from which leaves and flowering branches hang. Rose buds give completeness to the composition. In the center of the composition, two male pheasants are placed between a rose and iris flowers. Two male pheasants are depicted above the roses. The movement and gender elements of the birds, the color shade of the iris, the pink shoots and the colors of the branches corresponding to them are correctly given.
	«Horseman»	Tempera	National Art Museum of Azerbaijan, Baku	The description in this work is weak, approximate and schematic. According to Miklashevsky, the image of a man and a horse looks like wood or like a doll. "Horseman" is the only work of Iravani that has a landscape and a horse image.
	«A man with a dagger»		National Art Museum of Azerbaijan, Baku	"A man with a dagger" is a primitive one-line stencil-painting. Natalya Miklashevskaya believes that the image of an old man with a nimbus around his head, the characteristic cross dagger, represents Ali ibn Abu Taleb, who is considered a saint by Shiites.
	«Dervish»	Glass, oil paint 21 × 13,2	National Art Museum of Azerbaijan, Baku	Dervish is depicted on a completely green background. Dervish's face is young and beardless, with a scar on his right cheek. Miklashevskaya also notes that squinting eyes have been added to the facial expression. Dervish's black hair is combed straight and reaches to his shoulders. Darvish is wearing a red dress. The collar, slippers, belt, and pointed hat are depicted in green; dress and hat decorated with gold. A striped scarf is draped over his right hand. In this hand, the dervish holds a tabarzin. Dervish has a kashkul in his left hand. These items are essential accessories for a dervish. In the middle of the dervish's hat is written "Allah" in the Arabic alphabet.
	«Dancer»	Glass, tempera	National Art Museum of Azerbaijan, Baku	A dancer accompanying herself on a tambourine is depicted on a plain green background. The colors of her clothing contrast with the background. The dancer wears a kaftan, a wide red skirt and a green belt around her waist. With the help of white and golden squares, as well as circles, a pattern line is created that separates the border of the clothes. An expressive face has broad lines. The dancer has ruddy cheeks, harshly highlighted lips and eyes, and two freckles, indicating that she is wearing make-up. Henna is placed on the tips of her fingers. Thick and fairly short hair covers the face on both sides. On the dancer's head is a light hat with a sharp point. During the dance, the movement of the body is given correctly, and the rhythmic movement of the legs is shown by the folds of the wide skirt. Pieces of gold paper are pasted on the picture drawn from the back of the glass. Currently, the portrait, which consists of six parts, has been transferred to another glass and framed.
	«Warrior»		National Art Museum of Azerbaijan, Baku	Depicted in armor, the "Warrior" is depicted seated on a green seat. His facial features are understated with harsh lines. His large oval eyes are framed by wide black eyebrows, and a large curly mustache shadows his lip. The headgear consists of an iron helmet and an iron net that falls to the shoulders. The white cloth in the form of a harness is a tirme. (Note: A tirme is a woolen oriental cloth decorated with fine textures.) This type of cloth was used to make the helmet fit firmly on the head. The kneecap and breastplate are decorated with simple carved patterns. The metal finish is gray with slight shading. The warrior has bright-orange kneepads and black boots, which Miklashevskaya sees as a pop of color in the warrior's monochrome outfit.
	«Portrait of Abbas Mirza»		National Art Museum of Azerbaijan, Bakı	In the work Abbas Mirza is depicted in a frozen state. His face is surrounded by a thick beard and a small mustache. His headdress is a black karagul hat. The long top is tied at the waist with a tie. Since the lower corner of the paper is lost, only one leg remains intact. Although the intact leg is visible in profile, the figure itself is depicted in Morocco. Miklashevskaya suggests that the second leg was depicted in a similar way. This portrait is the only one of Iravai's surviving works that was painted on large-format paper and used only black paint.
	«Portrait of Tsarevich Alexander with his wife»		National Art Museum of Azerbaijan, Baku	The paper on which the work is described is framed with a 2 cm wide ornamental line. On the black background of the frame, the floral motif found in other works of Irevani is reflected. It consists of buds and slits. The pattern consists of multi-branched shoots and leaves that vary in color and shape. Blue, white, pink and red heads of flowers alternate. Thanks to the precise drawings and the black background, the ornament looks like an inlay made of colored stones. In the lower horizontal part, medallions are shown instead of flowers along almost the entire length. On the black background of the medallion is written in Russian: "Taken by college assessor Kadym bey". To the left of the inscription, in the corner, there is the signature of the artist: "Drawn by Kadım bey". Tempera on paper is in good condition, except for a partial loss of color from the center where the paper folds. A small piece of paper is lost in the lower corner where the writing is, but this does not prevent the writing from being fully legible.
	«Portrait of a Young Woman»	Paper, watercolor and tempera 35 × 28	National Art Museum of Azerbaijan, Baku	The portrait depicts a young woman with a slightly sad expression on her face. The features of the face are straight, wide, interlocking black eyebrows draw attention to large, expressive brown eyes. Her dark chestnut hair, with wavy strands falling down to her shoulders, was combed smooth in a straight line. The woman is depicted sitting on a carpet next to a white marble wall. The headdress is a shawl, and as a complementary element, a rose is attached to the hair with a pin. The woman is wearing a thin yellow blouse bordered with black work and with a large round collar. A large and small buta pattern decorates the red background of Irevani's embroidered robe on top of the blouse. Also, the pleats of the wide blue skirt (fog) are beautiful. Silk was avoided, the material of the big matakke was well expressed by the artist. The harmony of the orange color of the material with the white animated elements is also beautiful. The entire lower part of the sheet is filled with carpet. The dominance of ocher, green and white colors is noticeable in the plant patterns of the blue background of the carpet. Determining the type of carpet is difficult due to the mixed character of the carpet painting. Without any perspective, completely vertically, like other works of Irevani, the carpet is shown spreading across the floor. The applied technique is fundamentally and fundamentally similar to miniature technique. Paintings made with tempera and watercolors have come down to our time in a well-preserved form.
	«Portrait of a Young Man»	Paper, watercolor 21 × 12	National Art Museum of Azerbaijan, Baku	A tall young man is depicted against a wall decorated with ornaments and a diamond-shaped grid decorated with blue rose-flowered diamonds. There is an inscription on a yellow-brown stripe located horizontally: «Portrait of Nawab Majulla Mirza. It was drawn by humble Mirza Kadym Irevani» The young man's face is framed by shoulder-length black hair. The smoky picture of pursed lips gives a whimsical expression to the face. This young man is wearing a short-sleeved shirt. The hem of the dress has a line decorated with a plant pattern. The back was open and a blue "frost" was visible under it. Dark blue pants give the outfit extra shine. The young man has a cap (dirabi) made of black material. A two-tone dot (blue and reddish brown) was used to give a light-shadow effect, which helps to outline the delicate face. The carving of the back is well done with the use of white and blue color with small bush drawings on a red background. The portrait was painted with great care and delicacy using watercolor and tempera. The work has reached our time in good condition.
	«Mirror triptych»	gypsum, tempera	Hermitage Museum, Saint Petersburg	The mirror and the miniature are surrounded by a 2.5 cm thick frame. Simple floral oraments are painted on the plaster mortar covering the wider part of the frame made of wood. The heads of the flowers are gathered in carved patterns that cover the inner plaster lining of the frame. The wings of the triptych are attached to each other by means of metal loops. Wooden doors are also made into a suitable surface for painting with plaster mortar. This has led to ensuring a fairly good state of preservation of the color layer. Colors are lost only on the edges and bottom of the plates. It is painted with tempera on plaster mortar and varnished. The varnish has yellowed with age, which gives a yellowish brown tone to the white background. The drawings on the upper and lower wings are identical. Three ribbons, different in their description, form an ornamental frame and surround the bouquet. The background is painted in blue. Stylized floral ornament is made in one tone - silver color. The white flowers in the second frame harmonize with the central white part. Those flowers resemble a lily. The six-petalled flowers on a central stalk of equal-sized zigzag interlaced branches are spaced similarly. The stalk is more clearly described here. Deep medallions (inscriptions) extending along the width of the frame of the upper wing and almost completely covering it are filled with texts. There are two medallions on the right and left sides, and one medallion on the top and bottom. The lower medallion has the artist's name, and the other medallions have verses written in Persian. (Note: Verses and other writings were read by A.A. Alasgarzade, senior researcher of the Institute of History and Philosophy of ANAS.) A ligature with fine floral ornament decorates the background. Write the verses on the right medallions, and the ones on the left on the trees (witnesses of the greatness of God). Although the author of the first verse is unknown, the second verse belongs to the famous Persian poet Saadi of the 14th century.
	«Portrait of Mah Talat»	Gypsum solution, tempera	Art Museum of Georgia, Tbilisi	The woman depicted in the national costume of Azerbaijan is depicted on the background of an open window (net). The blue sky is visible from the window. The woman put her left hand on her hip and lowered her right hand. The middle part of the net is decorated with colorful glass because it is located in the middle and is raised so that it looks like it is on the woman's head. The green curtains hanging on the side windows are gathered from below and drawn towards the edges of the work. The floor is carpeted with a wide border. According to Miklashevskaya, although the lines of the woman's face, which is almost round, are less marked and expressionless, it certainly conveys the appropriateness of a portrait. Her black hair, falling in large bunches to her shoulders, surrounds her face. The headdress is light and is decorated with a busha of flowers and precious stones and pearls. Another piece of jewelry used by the lady is a mulberry attached to the earrings. There is a big ring on the index finger of the right hand. The wide bust of the blue blouse with yellow cuffs allows you to see the second yellow blouse. Over a layered green skirt (fog) and blouse, the lady wore a terry robe with elbow-length sleeves. The dark red surface of the plow is decorated with bushes arranged side by side. A carefully and delicately crafted floral tapestry wraps around the edges of the portrait like a frame. On the blue surface of the medallion located in the lower part of the frame, it is written in yellow paint: "Drawn by College Assessor Kadim Bey".
	«Rose and nightingale»		National Art Museum of Azerbaijan, Baku	The work depicts a large rose, buds and green leaves. The absence of a dot on the first leaf attracts attention. Other parts of the work are treated with one or two layers of paint. Only the lower side of the branch is green. A nightingale is depicted below the large rose. The work has reached our time in good condition.

== Literature ==
- Эривани / Под ред. Б. В. Иогансона. — Искусство стран и народов мира (краткая художественная энциклопедия): Советская энциклопедия, 1962. — С. 61.
- Миклашевская Н. М. Художники XIX в. Мирза Кадым Эривани и Мир Мохсун Навваб / Под ред. Полевого В. М.. — Искусство Азербайджана. — Баку, 1954. — Т. IV.
- Əliyev Z. Mirzə Qədim İrəvaninin yaradıcılığı Archived 2015-05-27 at the Wayback Machine (азерб.) // Каспий : газета. — 2015.
