= Dervish (Irevani) =

Painting by Mirza Gadim Iravani

- Dərviş
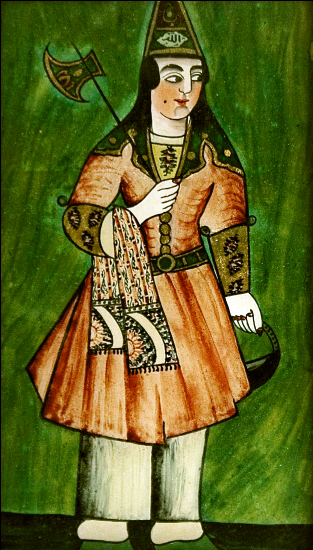
- Artist: Mirza Kadym Irevani
- Year: first half of the 19th century
- Medium: Oil on glass
- Location: National Art Museum of Azerbaijan; Paris

Dervish (Azerbaijani: Dərviş) is a painting by the 19th-century Azerbaijani artist Mirza Kadym Irevani, dating back to the early period of the artist's work. Made in oil on glass. Stored in the National Art Museum of Azerbaijan in Baku.

== Description ==
In the inventory book of the National Art Museum of Azerbaijan, this work was erroneously recorded under the title "Man". Currently exhibited under the name "Dervish". The dervish is depicted in full growth on a green background. The torso of the dervish is depicted in front, and the face is in three quarters, while the legs are in full profile. The dervish's face is young and beardless, with a mole on his right cheek. According to art historian Natalya Miklashevskaya, it resembles the face of a dancer, another work by Erivan of this period. The expressiveness of the face, as noted by Miklashevskaya, is given by slyly looking eyes. The black hair of the dervish is smoothly combed and falls to the shoulders.

The dervish is dressed in a red jubbe. The collar, shoes, belt and pointed cap of the depicted are green; the dress and hat are trimmed with gold. A striped scarf is thrown over the right hand of the dervish. In it he holds a "teberzin". And in the left hand - keshkul. These items are essential accessories for a dervish. In the center of the cap, the word "Allah" is arranged in Arabic script.

As Miklashevskaya notes, the technique of performing "Dervish" is similar to Erivan's work on glass "Dancer". The state of the work is good.

== See also ==
- Mirza Kadym Irevani

== Sources ==
- Миклашевская, Наталья; König, Eberhard (1954). Художники XIX в. Мирза Кадым Эривани и Мир Мохсун Навваб. Baku: Искусство Азербайджана.
