= Gogiashvili =

Gogiashvili is a Georgian surname. Notable people with the surname include:

- Anton Gogiashvili (1878–1907), Georgian painter and engraver.
- Giorgi Gogiashvili (born 1971), retired Georgian professional footballer.
- Guram Gogiashvili (born 1934), Georgian writer, translator and editor.
- Jemal Gogiashvili (born 1988), Georgian professional footballer.
