= Portrait of a Young Man (Iravani) =

Painting by Mirza Gadim Iravani

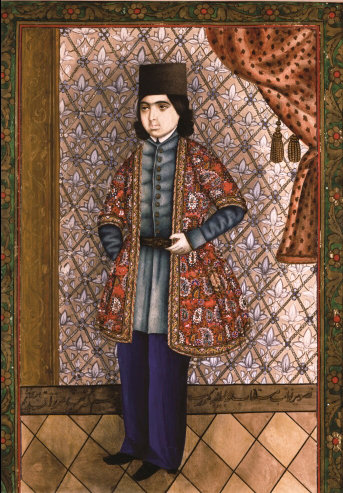
Portrait of a Young Man (19th century)

Portrait of a young man or The young man is a mid-nineteenth century watercolor painting by Mirza Gadim Iravani, an Azerbaijani painter. The painting is stored in the National Art Museum of Azerbaijan in Baku. The ornamentality is thoroughly harmonized with volumetric and plastic modeling of the shape as in other paintings by Iravani. Although the portrait was closely related to traditions of the medieval oriental miniature, the artist's interest in the external appearance of a man portrayed in the three-dimensional space of a concrete interior illustrates a crucial development in the Azerbaijani visual arts of the time.

== Description ==
A slender young man is portrayed against a background of a wall decorated with fine ornaments and diamond-shaped frames where each diamond is decorated with blue flowers. The face of the young man is framed with dark shoulder-length hair. A blurry picture of plump lips gives the face a naughty expression. The young man is dressed in an arkhalig made of tirma, with short sleeves. The ends of the garment are decorated with a flower-patterned fringe. The arkhalig is wide open, and a blue shirt is visible underneath. The dark blue trousers complete the brightness of the garments. There is an inscription in the horizontal ochre-colored line:

Portrait of His Excellency, noble Vajullah Mirza. Painted by humble Mirza Gadim Iravani.

An error occurred in the previous reading of this inscription. Thus, the word “navvab” (noble) was thought to be the name of the painter when the painting was first registered in the museum. As a result, the portrait of a young man had been identified as a portrait painted by Mir Mohsun Navvab in his youth.
