= 1993 National Art Museum of Azerbaijan theft =

Art theft in Baku, Azerbaijan

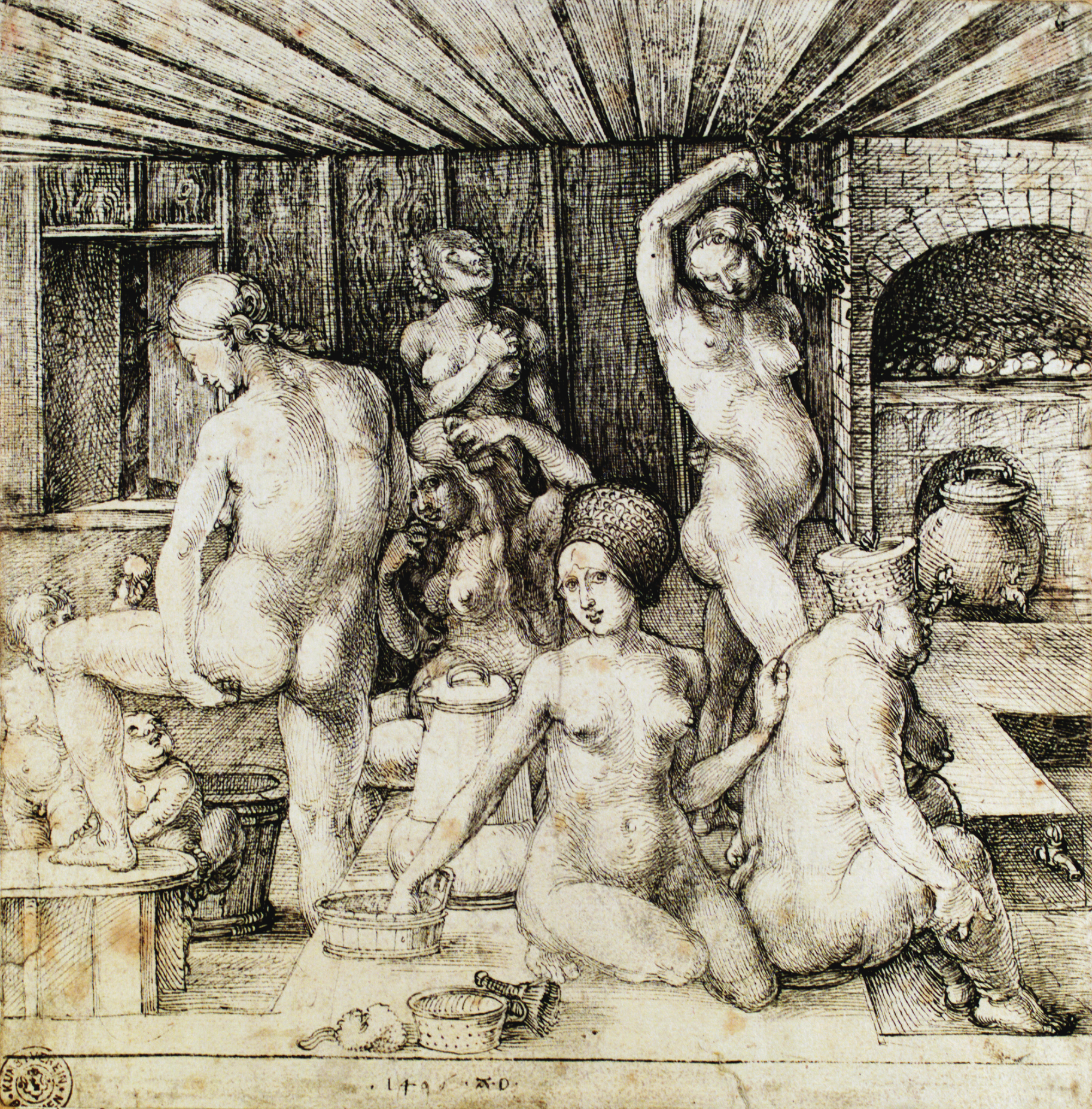
Women's Bathhouse by Dürer, housed in the National Art Museum of Azerbaijan at the time

In July 1993, a total of 304 items were stolen from the National Art Museum of Azerbaijan in Baku. They included 274 artworks and 30 medieval miniatures. The most valuable of them was Women's Bathhouse by Albrecht Dürer, valued at about $10 million. Other stolen artworks were made by Rembrandt, Anthony van Dyck, Nicolas Poussin, Jacob van Ruisdael and Jean-François Millet, among others. The artworks had been smuggled to the United States, from which they were later recovered. In 2001, twelve artworks were returned to their previous place of display, the Kunsthalle Bremen in Germany, while the rest were returned to Azerbaijan.

== Background ==
The artworks that were returned to Germany had been acquired by the Kunsthalle Bremen between 1820 and 1860. In 1943, during World War II, the artworks were among 1,520 treasures moved for safekeeping to Karnzow Castle. After advancing Soviet troops had occupied the castle, the drawings disappeared. According to Paul J. Browne, former senior adviser in the US Customs Service's office of investigation, the Soviet authorities transferred the drawings to the National Art Museum of Azerbaijan. In 1993 the museum announced plans to display the drawings, prompting the Germans to ask for their return. Azerbaijan and Germany started a repatriation discussion, when the theft took place in July 1993.

== Theft ==
Early circumstances of the theft were described by Ziyadkhan Aliyev, then Head of the Western European and Russian Art Department of the museum. According to him, the museum employee Jabrayil Babayev received a key to the museum's Graphics Fund from the museum's director. Babayev collected the drawings from the fund and took them to the house of the museum's director. The next day, upon request of museum's director, Babayev took the artworks to the Azerbaijani Ministry of Culture, room no. 325. The room housed the Department of Cooperation with Museums and Libraries, headed by Karim Tahirov at the time. However, Babayev in his testimony did not specify the person who received the artworks from him. The artworks then were smuggled from Azerbaijan to the United States.

According to US Customs, in 1995 Aydin Ibrahimov, an Azerbaijani Olympic wrestler, his former wife, Natavan Aleskerova, and former Japanese wrestler Masatsugu Koga met at a Chinese restaurant in the Swissôtel in Istanbul to plot the ransoming of the works to the Germans. Ziyadkhan Aliyev accused the museum employees of the theft, noting that Ibrahimov was not among its masterminds who escaped criminal liability.

Investigative authorities were initially told that the stolen artworks had little value. To determine whether they are authentic, then-Minister of Culture of Azerbaijan Polad Bulbuloglu organized a four-person expert commission, without the knowledge of investigative authorities. The commission included two art conservators, Natig Safarov and Gulshen Hajiyeva. The experts stated that the stolen artworks do not have museum value, but the art conservators were more cautious, stating that the final conclusion could be reached only after a physical and chemical examination. Despite that, the opinion of two other experts prevailed which was reflected in the final conclusion that the stolen artworks are of no museum value. This opinion was announced on television by Polad Bulbuloglu. Bulbuloglu later acknowledged that the stolen artworks were valuable.

== Recovery and arrests ==
According to Ziyadkhan Aliyev, the Azerbaijani law enforcement got on the track of the suspects relatively quickly, within about a week.

In the summer of 1997, Koga entered the German embassy in Tokyo showing photographs of the stolen drawings, which he described as family heirlooms, and offered to sell them back for $12 million. When the Germans told Koga that the drawings he was trying to sell had been stolen, he said they were not heirlooms after all and dropped the asking price to $6 million, which he said he needed for a kidney transplant. Still being declined, he left.

In September 1997, in the Grand Hyatt hotel in New York, Koga met with Anne Rover-Kann, curator of the Kunsthalle Bremen, and a US Customs undercover agent posing as her associate. When Koga showed the Dürer and Rembrandt drawings from a plain manila envelope, he was arrested.

In October 1997, Aleskerova, apparently learning of the arrest and concerned about the rest of the art, flew to New York, where she was stopped at John F. Kennedy International Airport until Customs agents could assemble a surveillance team. However, she was picked up by her son from a previous marriage, then a student at New York University. According to US Customs, a car pursuit ensued, where Aleskerova's son drove so erratically that agents had to pull them over. Aleskerova was arrested, while her son was released. Aleskerova was convicted in June 1999 and served an 11-month federal sentence in New York. Koga pleaded guilty, but, having suffered from renal failure, died at 64 in March 1999 in Tokyo.

The remaining missing artworks works from the National Art Museum of Azerbaijan were later retrieved from the closet and the bed of an apartment at 540 Ocean Parkway in New York, the home of another Azerbaijani wrestler. According to US Customs, he appeared to have no knowledge of the plot but was doing a favor for Ibrahimov. In 2001, twelve artworks were returned to Germany, while the rest were returned to Azerbaijan.

In September 2006, Ibrahimov surrendered to Azerbaijani authorities and was given a seven-year suspended sentence.
