= Anton Gogiashvili =

20th-century Georgian painter

- Born: 24 December 1878; Cholabargi, Guria, Kutais Governorate, Russian Empire
- Died: 28 December 1907 (aged 29); Tiflis, Tiflis Governorate, Russian Empire
- Education: Tbilisi Art School; Tbilisi Spiritual Seminary
- Known for: Painting

Anton Gogiashvili (Georgian: ანტონ გოგიაშვილი 24 December 1878 – 28 December 1907) was a Georgian painter. He is known for his portraits that showcase the life of the Georgian people, which were published in Georgian newspapers like Kvali, Cnobis Purtseli, Suratebiani Damateba and Shroma. They are now housed in the Art Museum of Georgia.

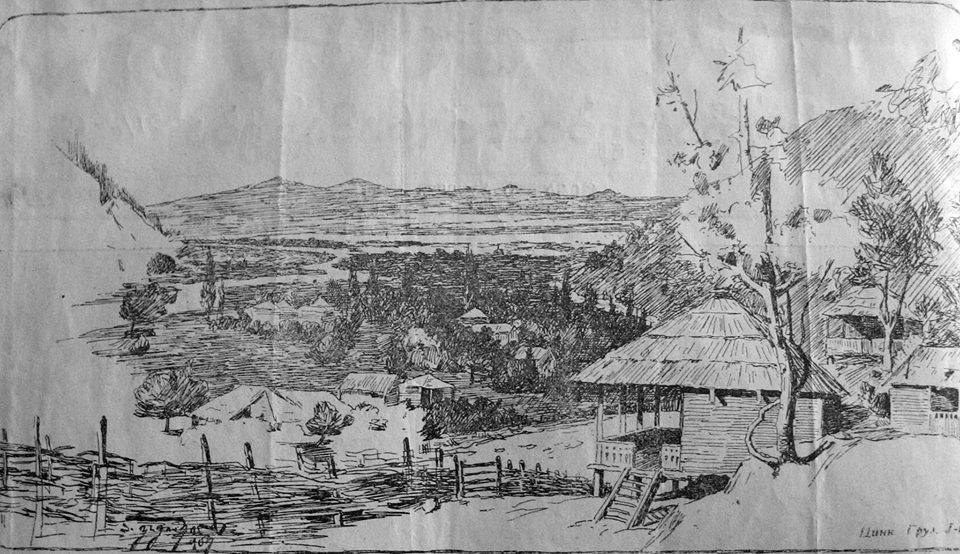
Work by Anton Gogiasvili
