= Mirza Kadym Irevani =

Painter from Erivan (1825–1875)

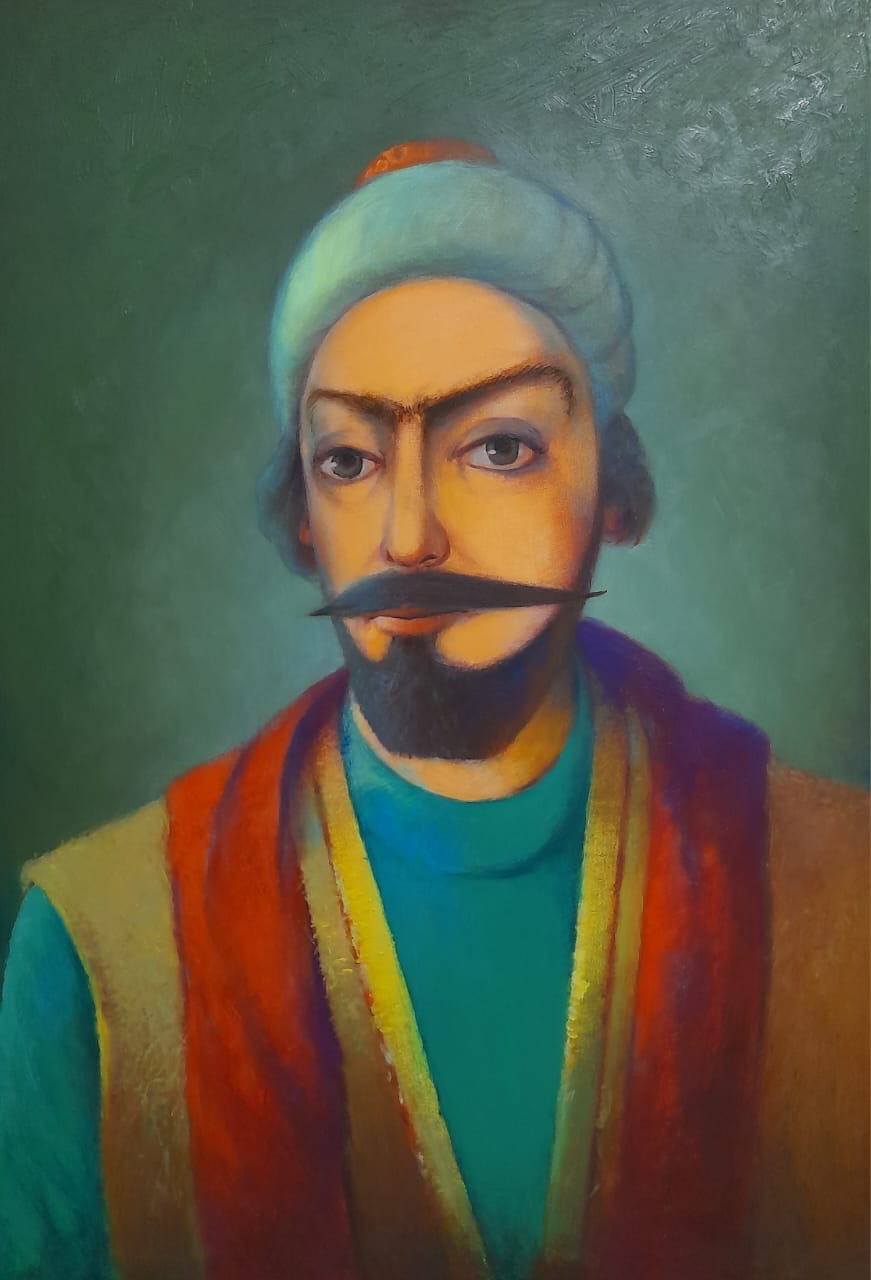
- Imaginary portrait by Telman Abdinov
- Born: c. 1825; Erivan, Erivan Khanate, Qajar Iran (now Armenia)
- Died: c. 1875; Erivan, Erivan Governorate, Russian Empire
- Education: Tiflis Progymnasium
- Known for: Painting
- Style: Applied arts, easel painting

Mirza Kadym Irevani (Note: His name was recorded in the Russified form "Kadim". "Kadym" is the Azerbaijani transliteration of the Russified version. In all likelihood, his original name was "Kāzem" (Persian: کاظم).) was an Azerbaijani ornamentalist artist and portraitist, whose work mostly consisted of typical Persian miniatures and lacquers.

Mirza Kadym Irevani is renowned for his drawings and miniature paintings. In the 1850s, he was commissioned by the Russians to repaint the interior of the Erivan Sardar's Palace, which had originally been painted by a Persian artist in 1815. He also painted 4 big (1 м X 2 м) portraits for the Sardar's Palace. Mirza Kadym Erivani's works are kept in the National Art Museum of Azerbaijan, the Art Museum of Georgia, and the Hermitage.

== Biography ==
Mirza Kadym Irevani was born in 1825, in the city of Erivan in Qajar Iran during the tenure of the last Iranian governor of the Erivan Khanate, Hossein Khan Sardar, and belonged to a "family of professional decorators". During Hossein Khan's capable governorship, Erivan prospered; the Sardar's Palace became decorated with mirrors, stuccos, and fourteen paintings.

The paintings depicted four heroes from the Iranian Shahnameh epic, including Rostam and Sohrab, as well as contemporary Iranian notables: King Fath-Ali Shah Qajar (r. 1797–1834), Abbas Mirza, Hossein Khan Sardar, and his brother Hasan Khan Qajar. Other paintings included two hunting and battle scenes. All fourteen paintings were originally painted in 1815 by a Persian painter named ʿAbd al-Rāziq.

At the decisive siege of Erivan of 1827, during the Russo-Persian War of 1826-1828, the Russian artillery gravely damaged the Sardar's Palace. After the Iranians were forced to cede Erivan to the Russians per the Treaty of Turkmenchay of 1828, the Erivan Sardar's palace was neglected by the Russians, and thus fell in ruins. A few decades later, in 1850, when Orientalism came in vogue, the Russians decided to rebuild the palace. The Russians commissioned Mirza Kadym Irevani to repaint the interior of the palace. Thus, "all historical figures depicted on the walls of the palace were from 30–40 years earlier than the time of Mirza Kadym Irevani".

Mirza Kadym Irevani's oeuvre consists mostly of "typical Persian miniatures and lacquers". He also created some "monumental and easel paintings with figurative motives", but they are considered to be of lesser aesthetic quality. In relation to his oeuvre, Associate Professor Irina Koshoridze adds:

The color range is not quite rich, and the proportions of the figures are not always right; they are occasionally even primitive. In the murals of the palace, he tried to follow the old schemes of the paintings of ʿAbd al-Rāziq, which is why the costumes and the compositional setting of the paintings have similarities with earlier Persian paintings (e.g., the Zand turbans, the early Qajar style cloth).

Mirza Kadym Irevani's paintings of the Sardar's Palace, as well as "a few of his oil paintings" are kept in the National Art Museum of Azerbaijan. Some of his other works are kept in the Hermitage in Saint Petersburg. Five paintings (Rostam, Sohrab, Fath-Ali Shah Qajar, Hossein Khan Sardar, and Hasan Khan Qajar) were moved to Georgia after the Russians demolished the Palace in 1914 and are kept in the Oriental arts department of the Art Museum of Georgia.

== Gallery ==
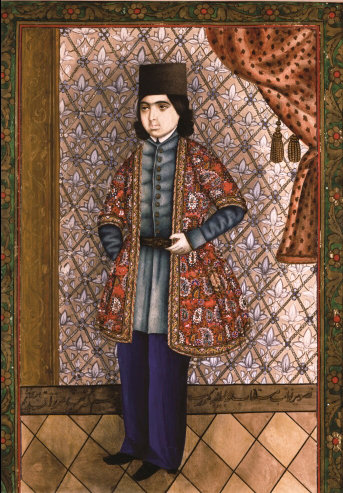
Portrait of a Young Man, Mid-19th century, Baku, National Art Museum of Azerbaijan

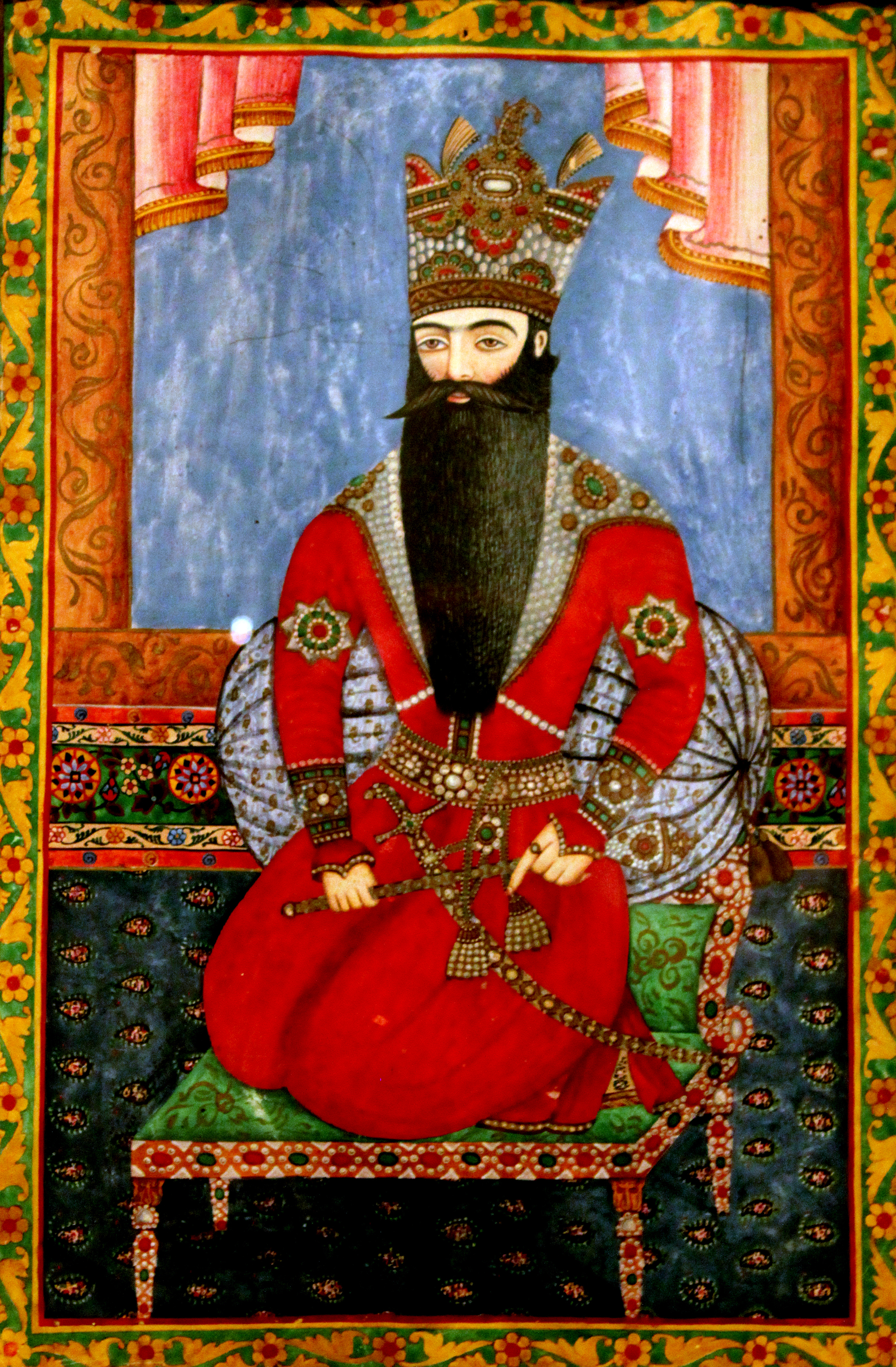
Portrait of Fath-Ali Shah, Baku, National Art Museum of Azerbaijan

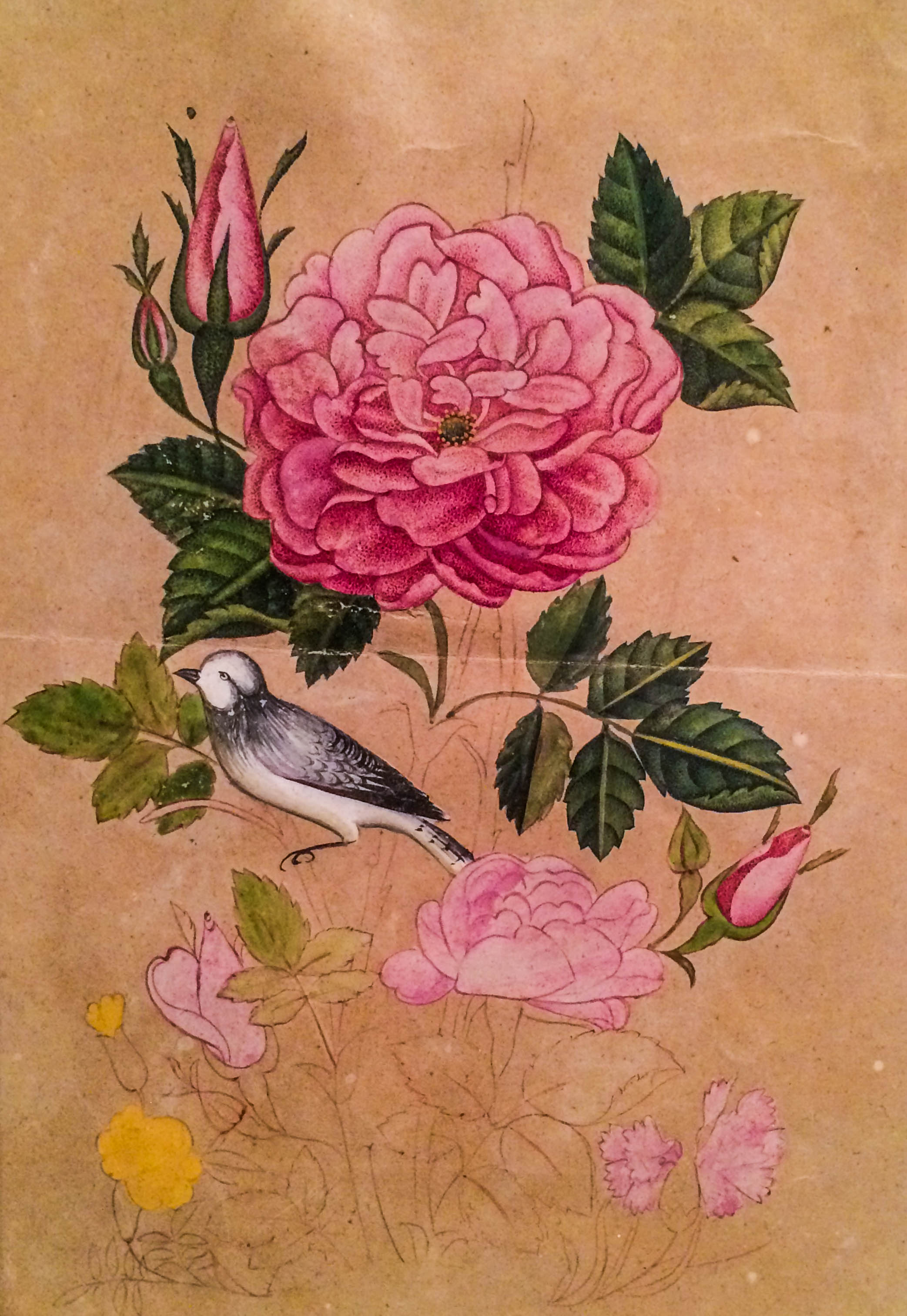
Roses and Nightingales, Baku, National Art Museum of Azerbaijan

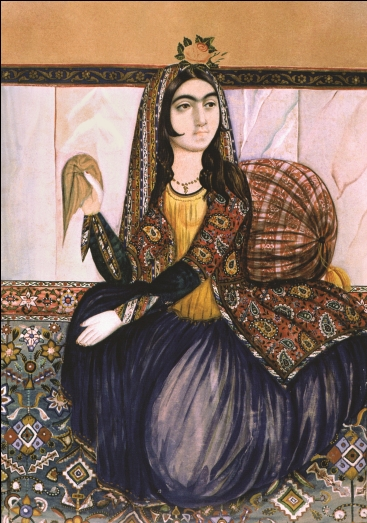
Portrait of a Sitting Woman, tempera, 1870s, Baku, National Art Museum of Azerbaijan

== Sources ==
- Gumppenberg, Marie-Carin von; Steinbach, Udo (2008). Der Kaukasus: Geschichte - Kultur - Politik (in German). C.H.Beck. ISBN 978-3-406-56800-8.
- Hambly, Gavin R. G. (1991). "The traditional Iranian city in the Qājār period". In Avery, Peter; Hambly, Gavin R. G.; Melville, Charles Peter (eds.). The Cambridge History of Iran: From Nadir Shah to the Islamic Republic. Vol. 7. Cambridge: Cambridge University Press. p. 552. ISBN 0-521-20095-4.
- Kettenhofen, Erich; Bournoutian, George A.; Hewsen, Robert H. (1998). "EREVAN". In Yarshater, Ehsan (ed.). Encyclopædia Iranica. Vol. VIII/5: English IV–Eršād al-zerāʿa. London and New York: Routledge & Kegan Paul. pp. 542–551. ISBN 978-1-56859-054-7.
- Koshoridze, Irina (2008). "Two 18th-Century Royal Palaces in Georgia and Armenia". Journal of Persianate Studies. 1 (2). Brill: 243–248. doi:10.1163/187471608786303920.
