= National Art Museum of Azerbaijan =

Coordinates: 40°21′47″N 49°49′54″E

Azerbaijan National Museum of Art
- Azərbaycan Milli İncəsənət Muzeyi
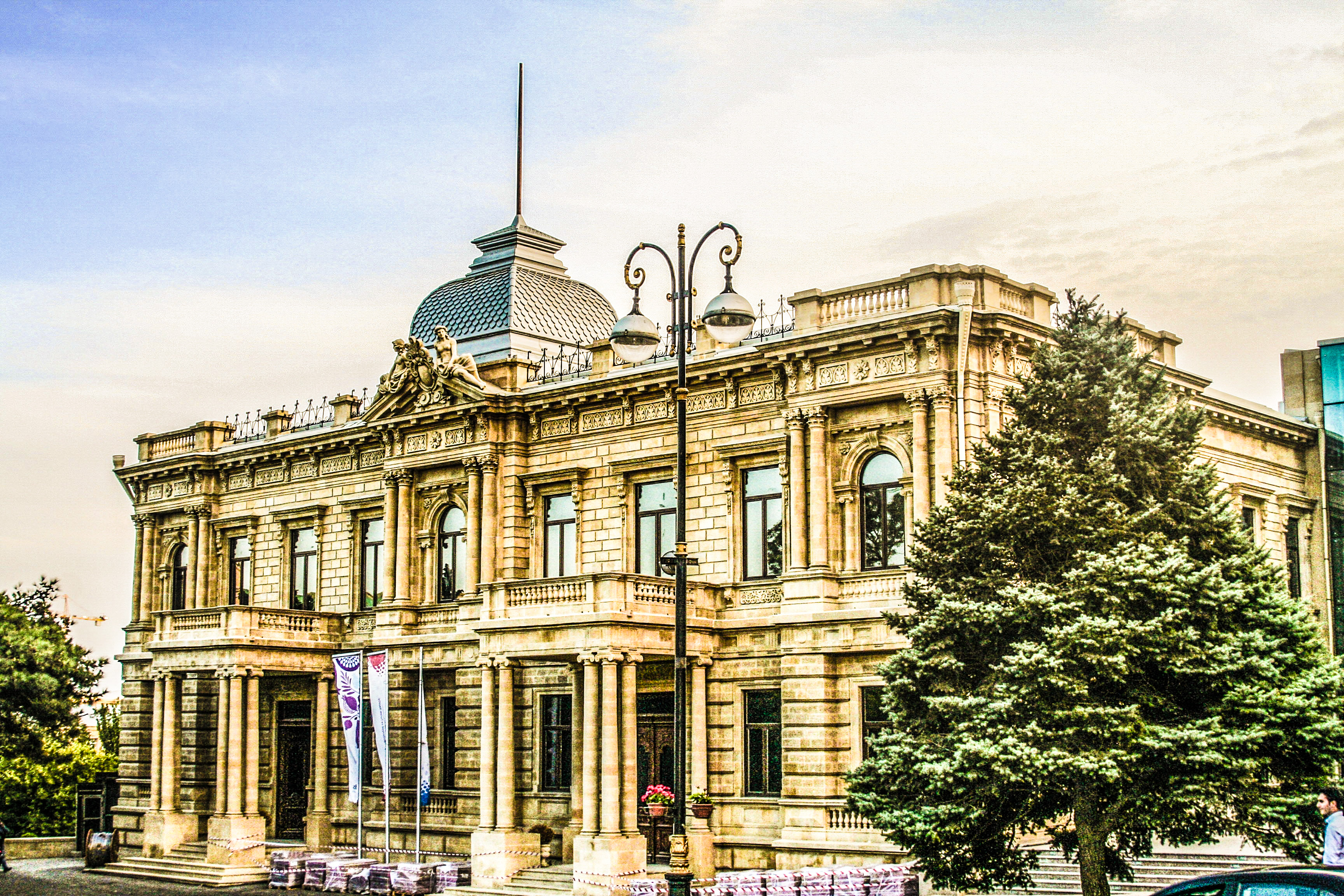
- Palace of De Boure - first building of the Azerbaijan National Museum of Art
- Established: 1936
- Location: Niyazi Street 9/11, Baku, Azerbaijan
- Type: Art museum
- Collection size: 15,000 items: 3,000 items displayed (12,000 items stored)
- Public transit access: M 1 Icheri Sheher metro station
- Website: Nationalmuseum.az

Azerbaijan National Museum of Art (Azerbaijani: Azərbaycan Milli İncəsənət Muzeyi) is the biggest art museum of Azerbaijan. It was founded in 1936 in Baku and in 1943 was named after Rustam Mustafayev, a prominent Azerbaijani scenic designer and theater artist. The museum consists of two 19th-century buildings standing next to each other. The museum's total collection includes over 15,000 artworks. There are over 3,000 items in 60 rooms on permanent display. About 12,000 items are kept in storage. The museum changes the exhibits periodically so that more of these artworks can be displayed temporarily.

== History ==
In 1936, the Council of People's Commissars of Azerbaijan SSR decided to separate the Art department from the Azerbaijan State Museum and organized it as an independent museum. Expeditions provided the museum with the first exhibits. In addition, other exhibits were purchased. The opening ceremony of the museum's first exhibition was organized in 1937 and in 1951, the museum moved to the Baroque-style De Bour mansion built at the end of the 19th century.

In July 1993, various artworks had been stolen from the museum and were later retrieved.

In 2006, the building was thoroughly reconstructed and the opening of a new exhibition took place in 2009. In 2011, the museum was declared to be of first National and then European Museum Standard (EUMS), meeting international standards and criteria, as appropriate for a museum and implying high-quality museum services and professional experience; this was by unanimous decision of the Council of Directors of the European Economic Chamber of Trade, Commerce and Industry – EEIG - located in Brussels. In May 2022, on International Museum Day, the Museum held a multimedia Museum Night as part of a strategic partnership with the UN to promote sustainable development.

There are approximately 9,000 scientific books and monographs, catalogues, albums and other professional literature in the library of the museum. There is also a rare book collection of old publications.

Exhibits preserved in the collection of Azerbaijan National Museum of Art include antique works of art that date from the 4th century BC. Ceramic bowls decorated with archaic ornamentation found in Nakhchivan, Mingachevir, Füzuli and Khanlar (now Goy-gol); decorative lamps and glazed tiles of the Seljuq period; parts of the friezes from the 13th century Bayil castle; 14th-18th century chests found in Absheron and Shamakhi; fine manuscripts about the Qur’an and 16th century books about astrology; original 17th-18th century Tabriz miniatures in tempera, gold water and watercolor; works by the celebrated artists Mir Mohsun Navvab, Mirza Qadim Irevani, Usta Qambar Qarabaghi, by the first professional artists in Azerbaijan and by our contemporaries; artistic metal items from the 16th and 17th centuries and samples of original fabric, embroidery, national costume and carpets and jewellery from the 18th-20th centuries are preserved here. Moreover, the collection of the national treasures, the examples of statuary, fine and graphic arts and other decorative-applied arts of Western Europe (France, Germany, Austria, Italy, Greece, Flanders, Denmark, Spain), the East (Iran, Turkey, Japan, China, India, Egypt, Middle East) and Russia is available at the museum.

Along with the carpets, other types of Azerbaijan decorative and applied arts, such as different techniques of embroidery, artistic metalwork, artistic fabrics, carving in wood, jewellery making, etc. are exhibited here. The gold thread embroidery of "gulabatin" type is widely spread throughout Azerbaijan. Shamakhi, Shusha, and Baku have traditionally been centers for this kind of art. Red and green velvet used to be the base for the gold and silver thread embroidery. Hats and so-called "arakhchins" were ornamented with rosettes and medallions made from stylized petals and stars. The "arkhalig" and "kulaja" also used to be embroidered with gold threads. The objects of different shape, size and purpose embroidered with gold threads including "arakhchins", kerchiefs, shoes, étuis for combs and cosmetics, dyes for eyebrows and eyelashes, étuis for watches, pencil-boxes, and many other things are displayed at the museum.

== Collection ==
Seven of the rooms in the first building feature European art, and ten rooms feature Russian art. European art includes works of Italian (Guercino, Leandro Bassano, Francesco Solimena, Lorenzo Bartolini), French (Jules Dupré, Gaspard Dughet, Pascal Dagnan-Bouveret, Jean-Joseph Benjamin-Constant), Dutch/Flemish (Frans Hals, Michiel Jansz van Mierevelt, Adriaen Brouwer, Adriaen van Ostade, Justus Sustermans, Pieter Claesz), German (Johann Heinrich Roos, Friedrich August von Kaulbach) and Polish (Jan Styka) painters.

The second edifice built in 1885 houses Eastern art, represented particularly by Persian, Turkish, Chinese and Japanese art. Russian art is encompassed notably by paintings of Karl Briullov, Alexey Venetsianov, Vasily Vereshchagin, Isaac Levitan, Vladimir Makovsky, Valentin Serov, Vladimir Borovikovsky, Vasily Tropinin, Konstantin Korovin and Ivan Shishkin. There are also restored samples of Russian avant-garde.

Among Azerbaijani artists represented are painters Mir Mohsun Navvab, Bahruz Kangarli, Tair Salakhov, Azim Azimzade, Salam Salamzade, Vidadi Narimanbekov, Mikail Abdullayev, Togrul Narimanbekov and sculptor Omar Eldarov. The works of Sattar Bahlulzade fill one entire room.

The museum also holds easel and book miniatures of 17th-19th centuries, lacquered miniatures of 18th-19th centuries and collection of sherbet spoons, made from mulberry tree.

The first works were obtained from Saint-Petersburg, Moscow and private collections. The museum expositions were later exhibited in Canada (1966), Cuba (1967), Syria (1968), France (1969), former Czechoslovakia, Algeria (both 1970), Iraq (1971) etc.

== Architecture ==
Calm horizontal division of the building is harmonized with verticals of clubhouse and Sadikhov's residential building. Von derr Nonne in regards to red lines of free streets was not connected to other buildings. The volumetric solution was implemented to the building to highlight its location and its view to the sea Classical elements, plastic means on rustication's background highlight the architectural style of the building.

This kind of buildings was usually made in the central streets of big cities. The gallery was also unique in the way it looked and was noticeable among other buildings. This building is considered one of the first attempts in the implementation of porticoes on the main facade, loggias - on the side and other plastic means. All this differentiates the building among others and gives volume on the perimeter of the building.

== The collection of antique and medieval art of Azerbaijan ==
This collection includes works of art from antique and Middle Ages, including figures of birds from Manna, female figures from III-I centuries BC, various ancient dishes from various territories of Azerbaijan which were found during excavations, a tombstone in a shape of horse, etc.

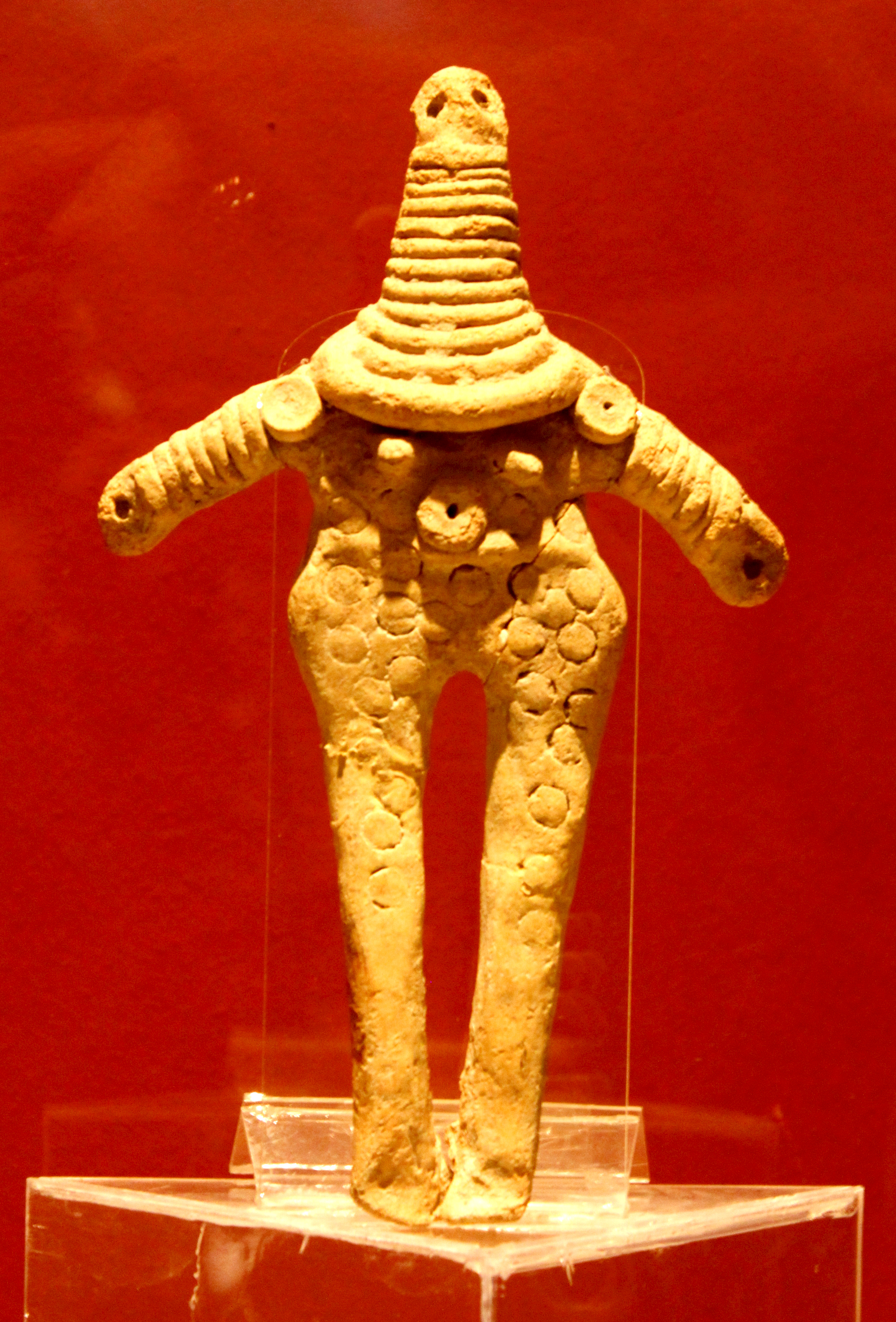

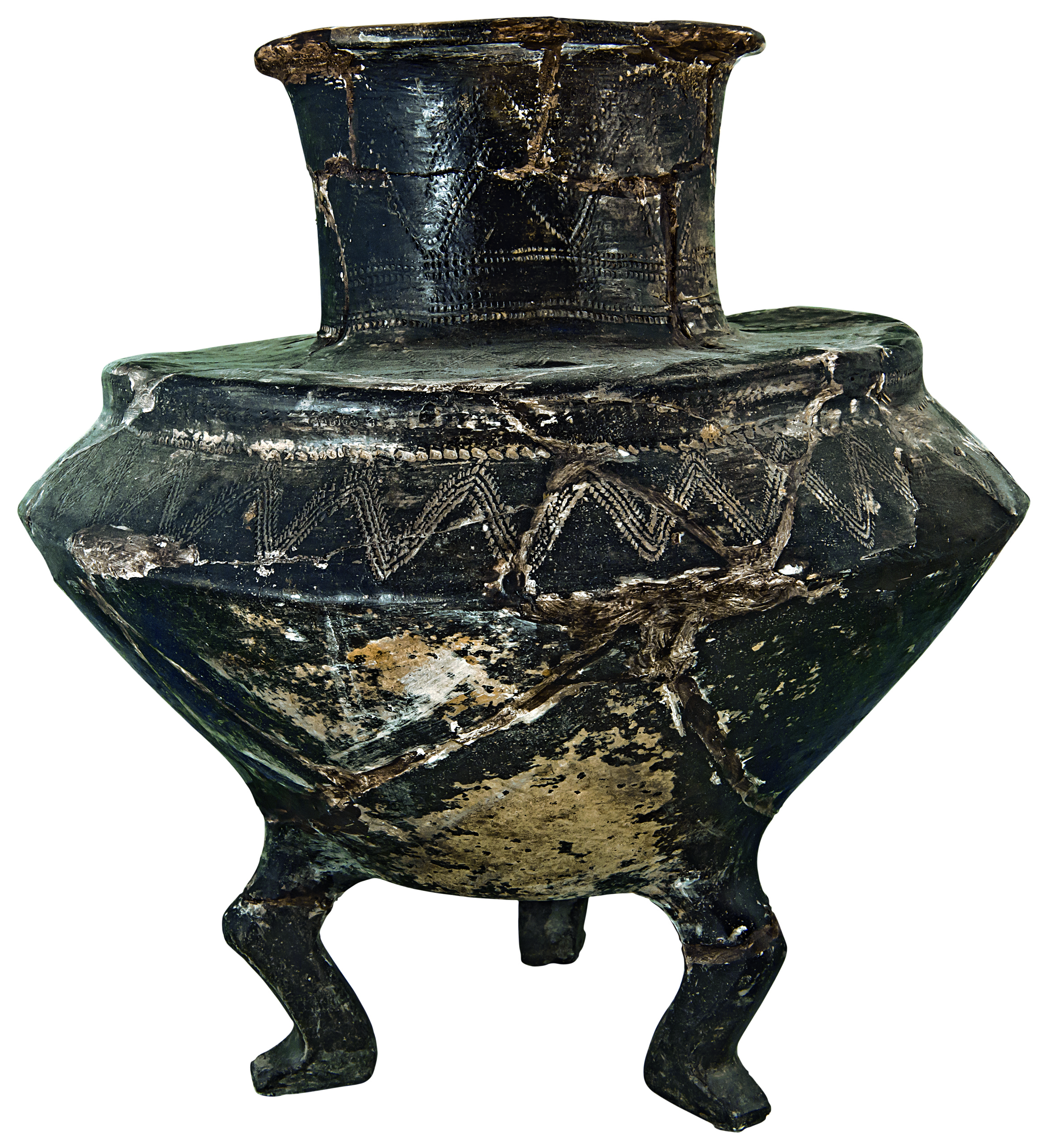

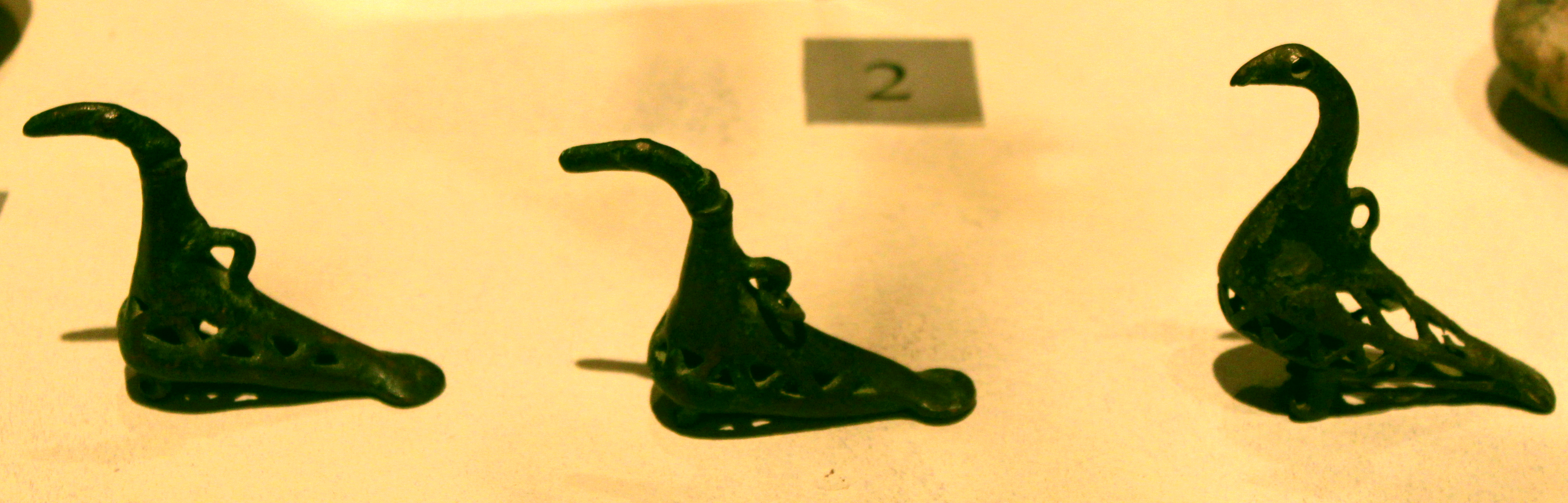

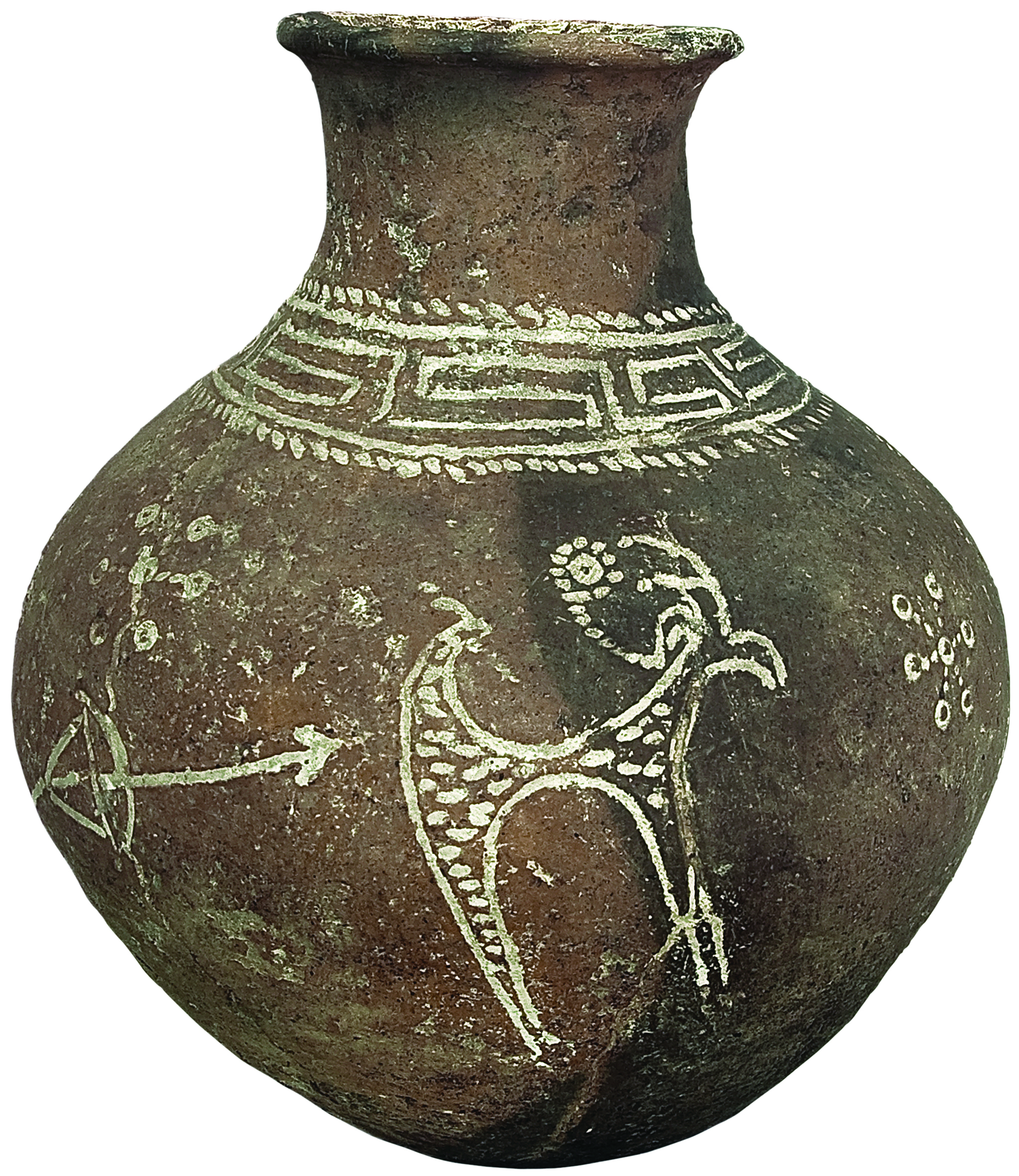

== Gallery ==
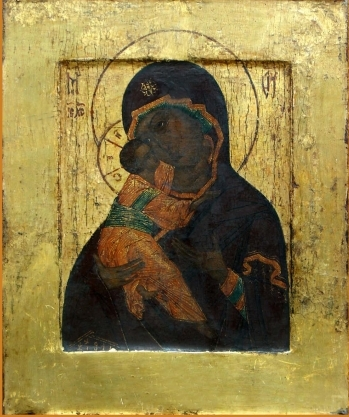
Theotokos of Vladimir, late 16th century

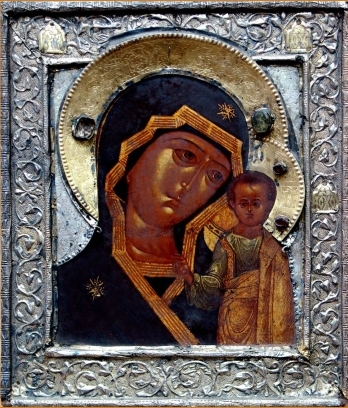
Our Lady of Kazan, late 17th century

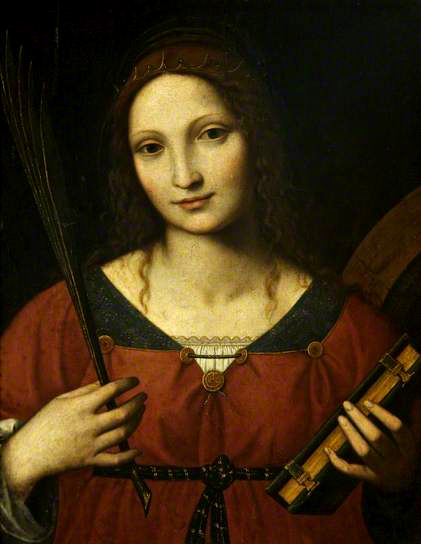
Bernardino Luini - St. Catherine, 16th century

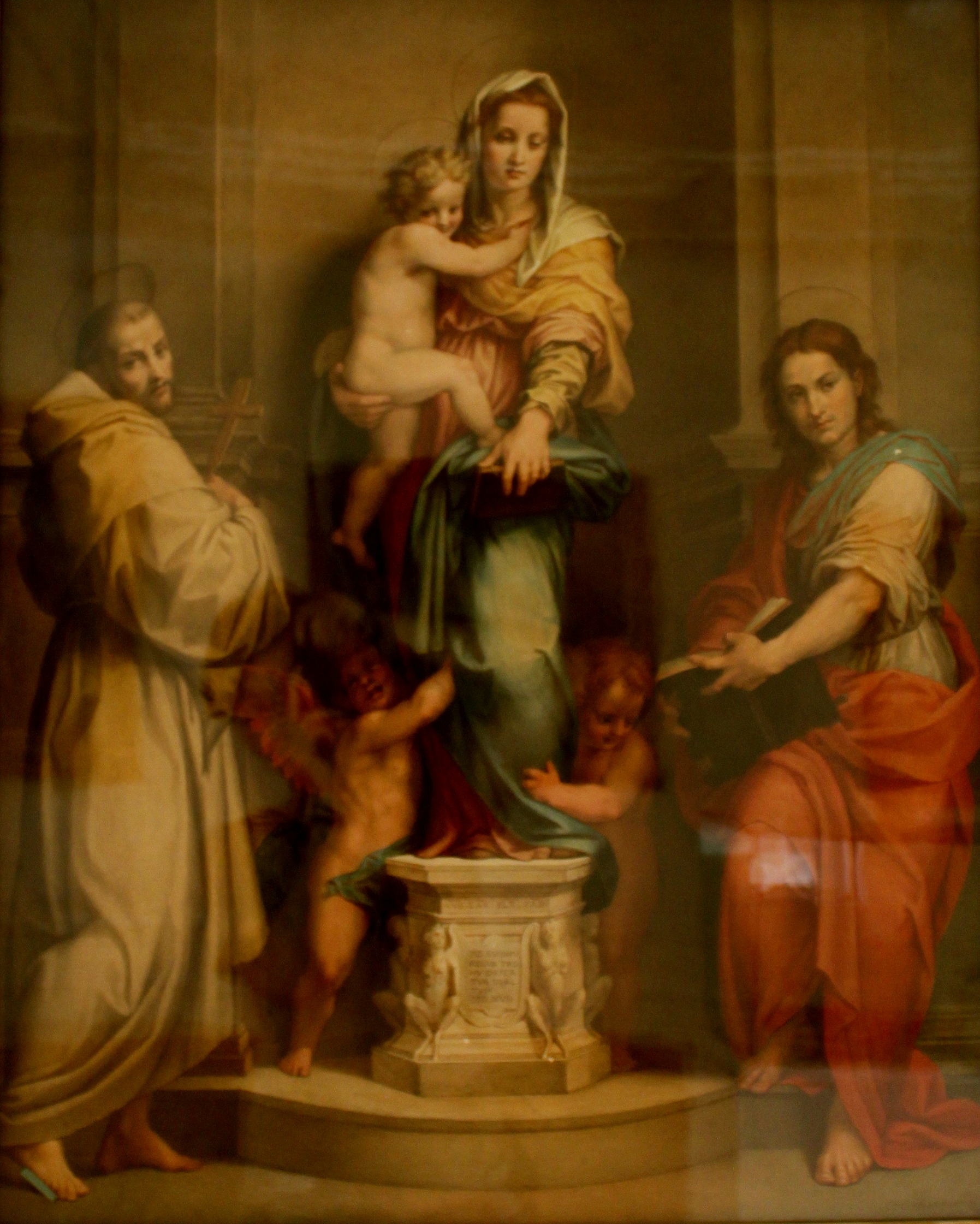
Andrea del Sarto - Madonna of the Harpies, 1517-1519

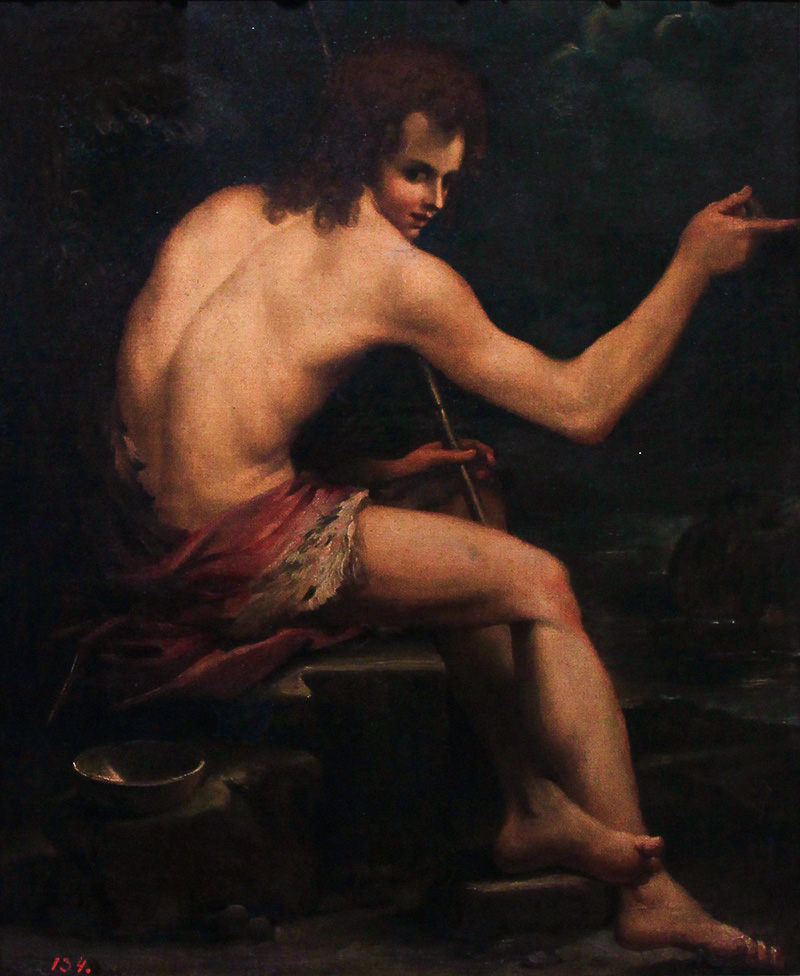
Bartolomeo Schedoni - John the Baptist, 17th century

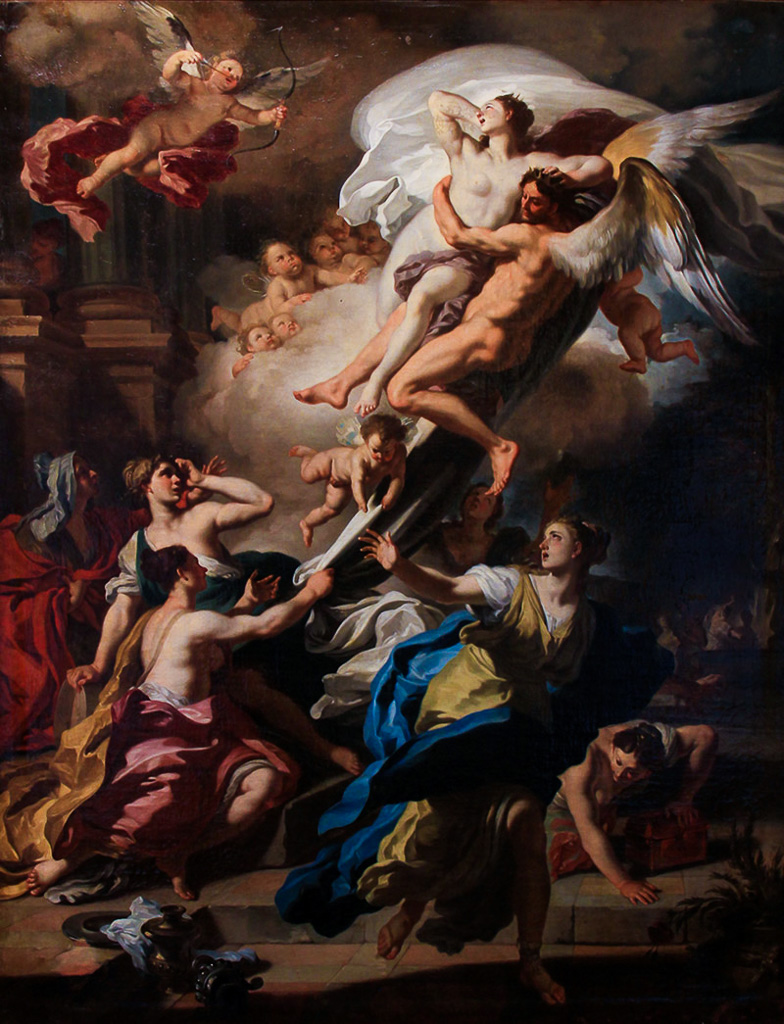
Francesco Solimena - Boreas Abducting Oreithyia, Daughter of Erechteus, 1729

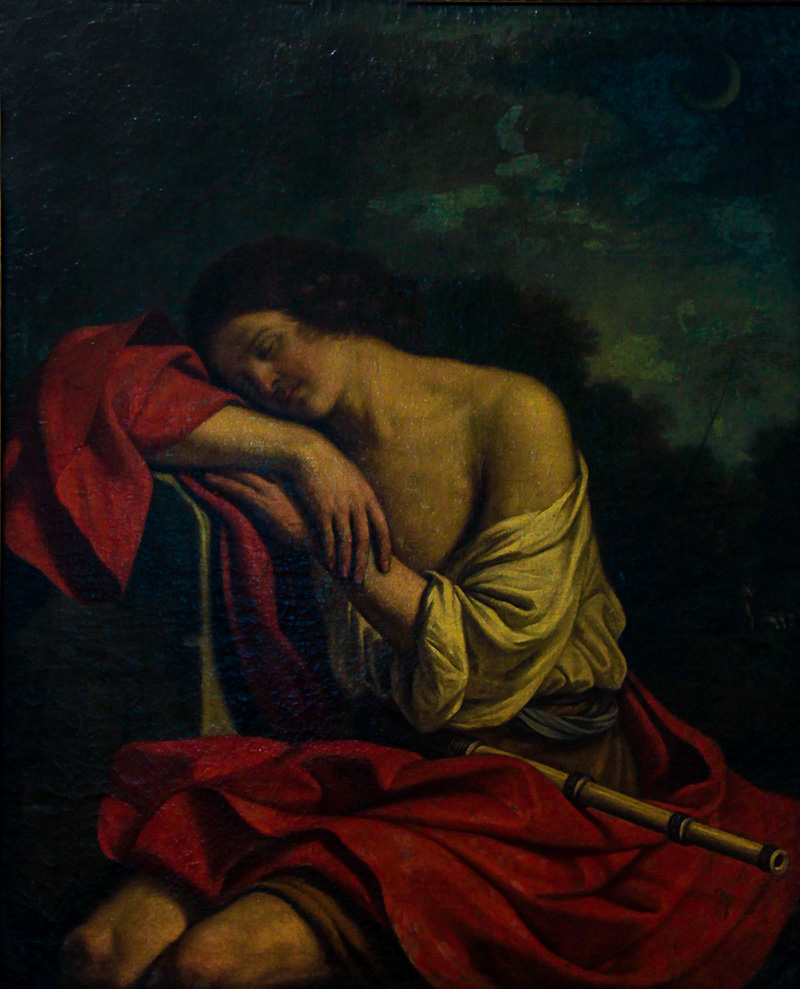
Guercino - Sleeping Endymion, 17th century

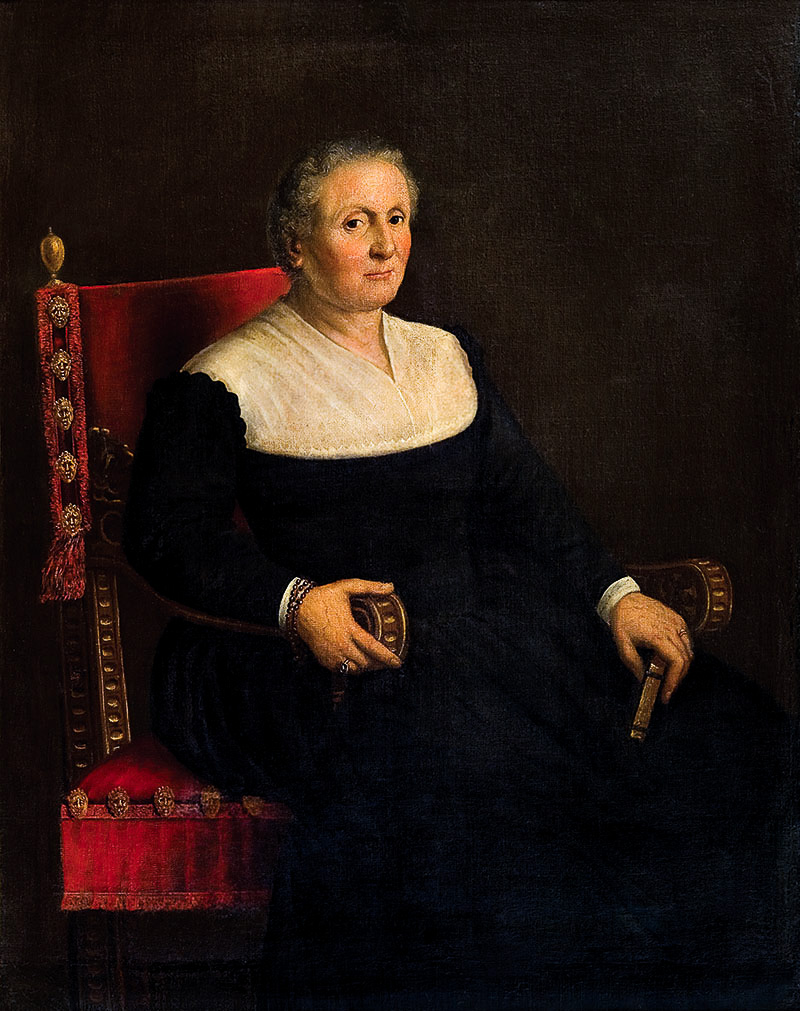
Leandro Bassano - Portrait of an Old Woman

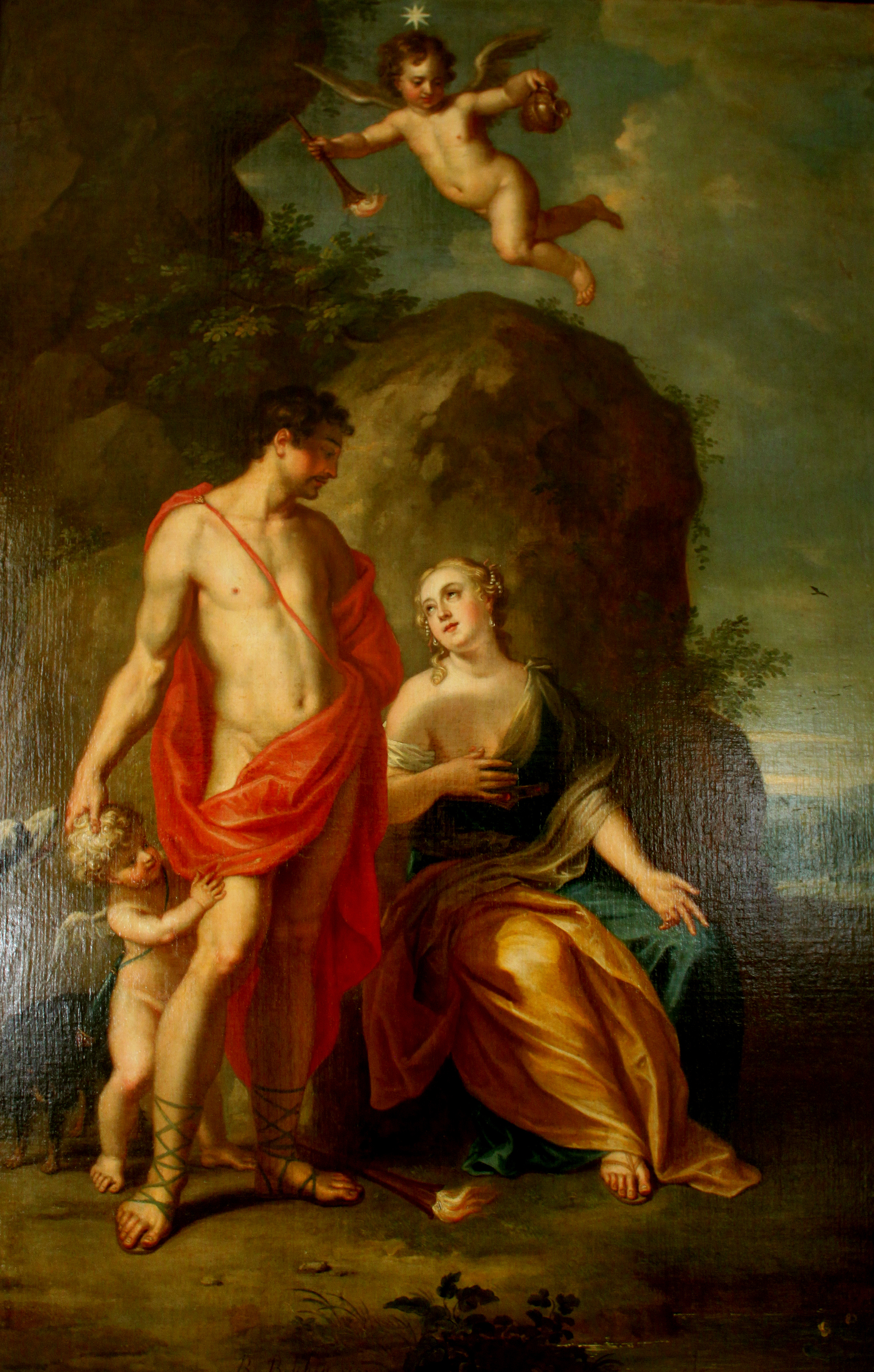
Balthasar Beschey - Venera and Adonis

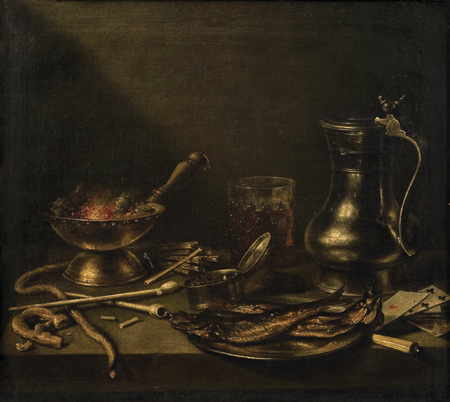
Pieter Claesz - Still life

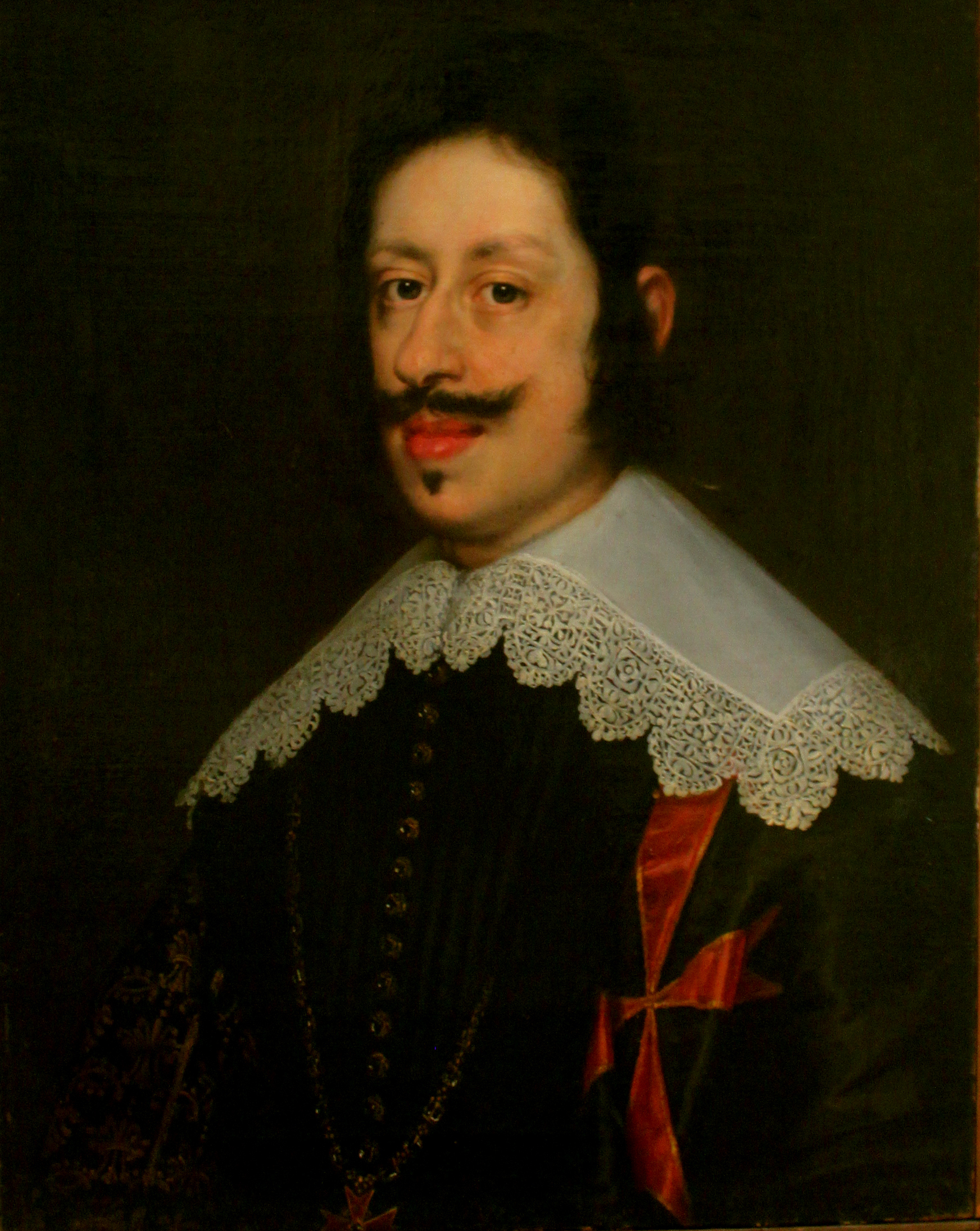
Justus Sustermans - Portrait of F. Medici, 17th century

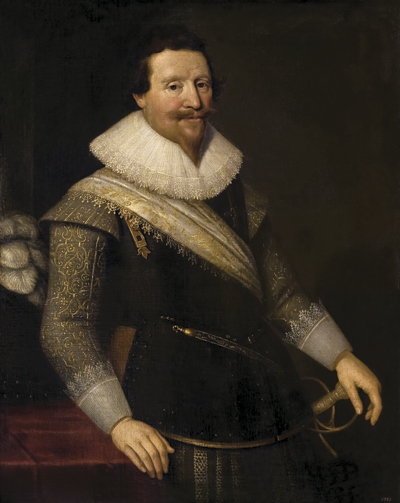
Michiel Jansz. van Mierevelt - Portrait of the Duke of Wallenstein, 17th century

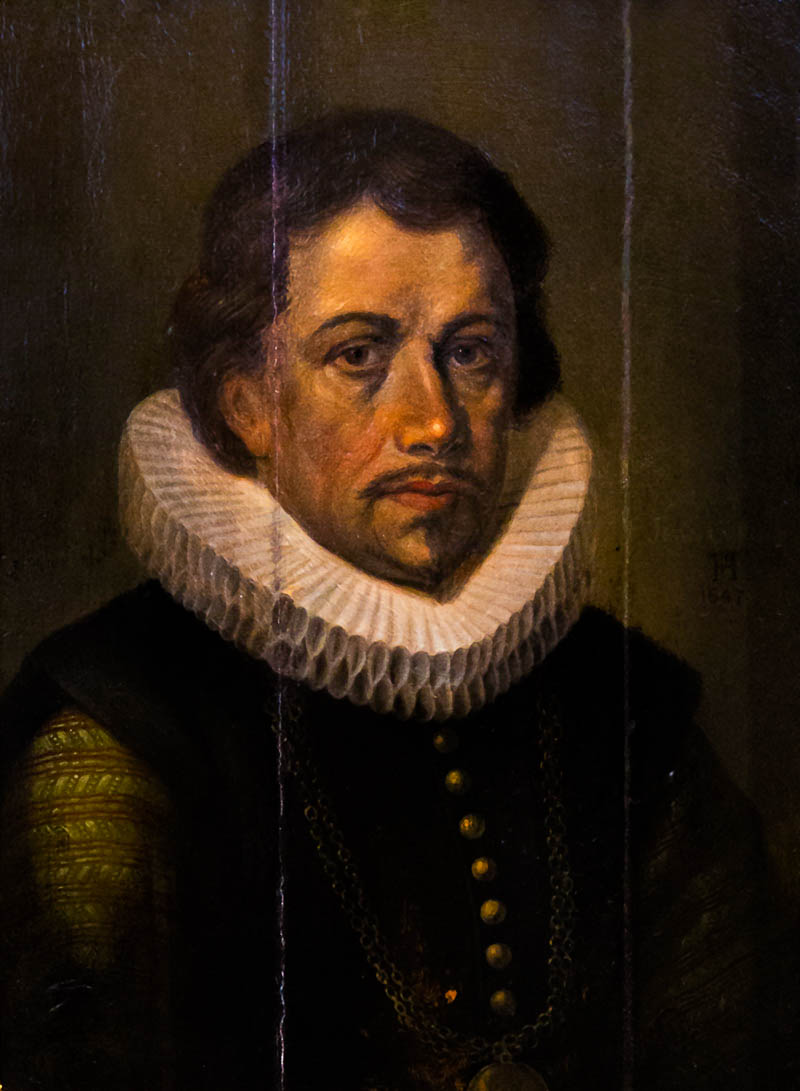
Frans Hals - Portrait of a man

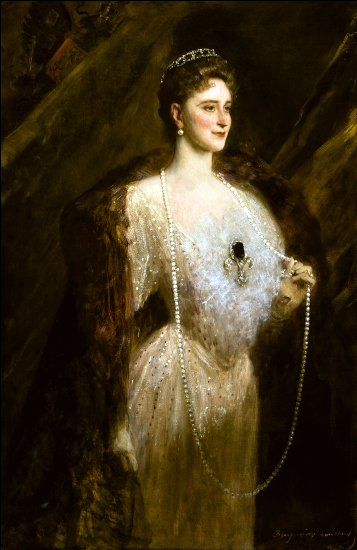
Jean-Joseph Benjamin-Constant - Portrait of the Empress Alexandra Fyodrovna, 19th century

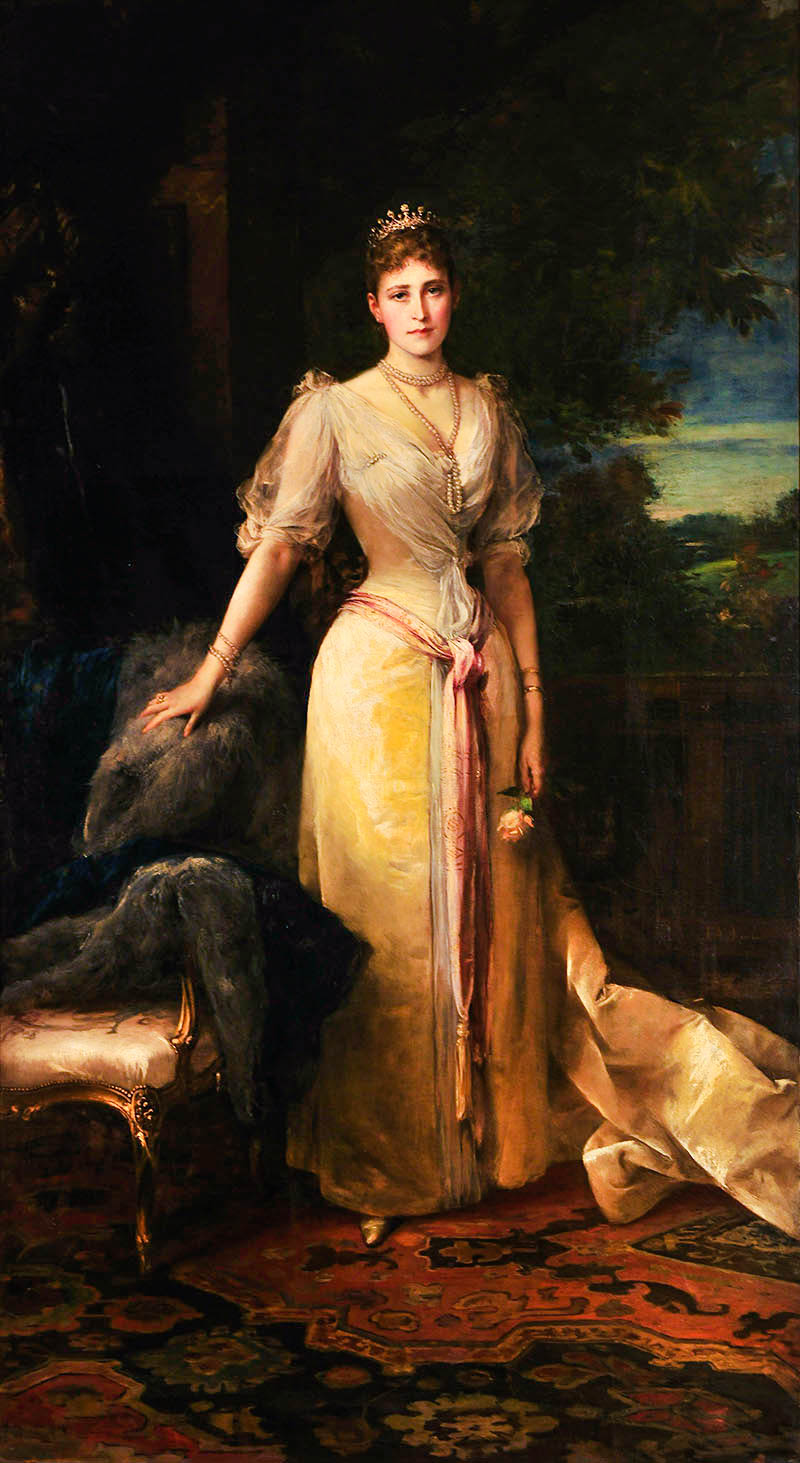
Friedrich August von Kaulbach - Portrait of Grand Duchess Elisabeth Feodorovna, 19th century

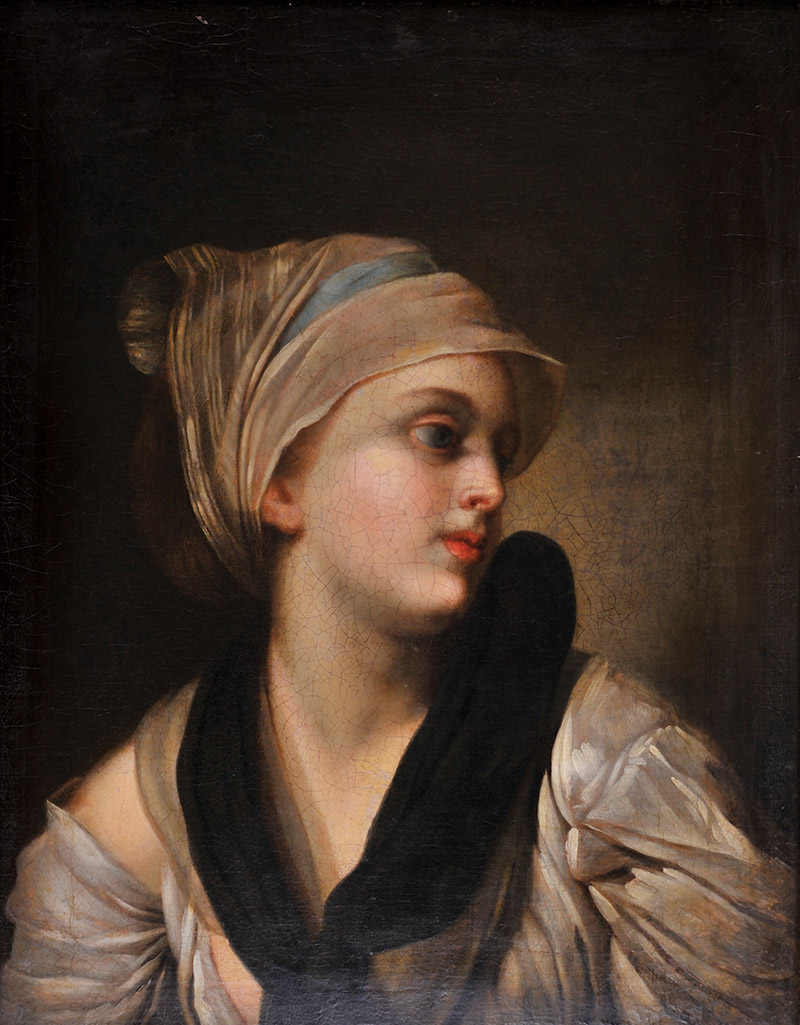
Jean-Baptiste Greuze - Portrait of a young woman, 18th century

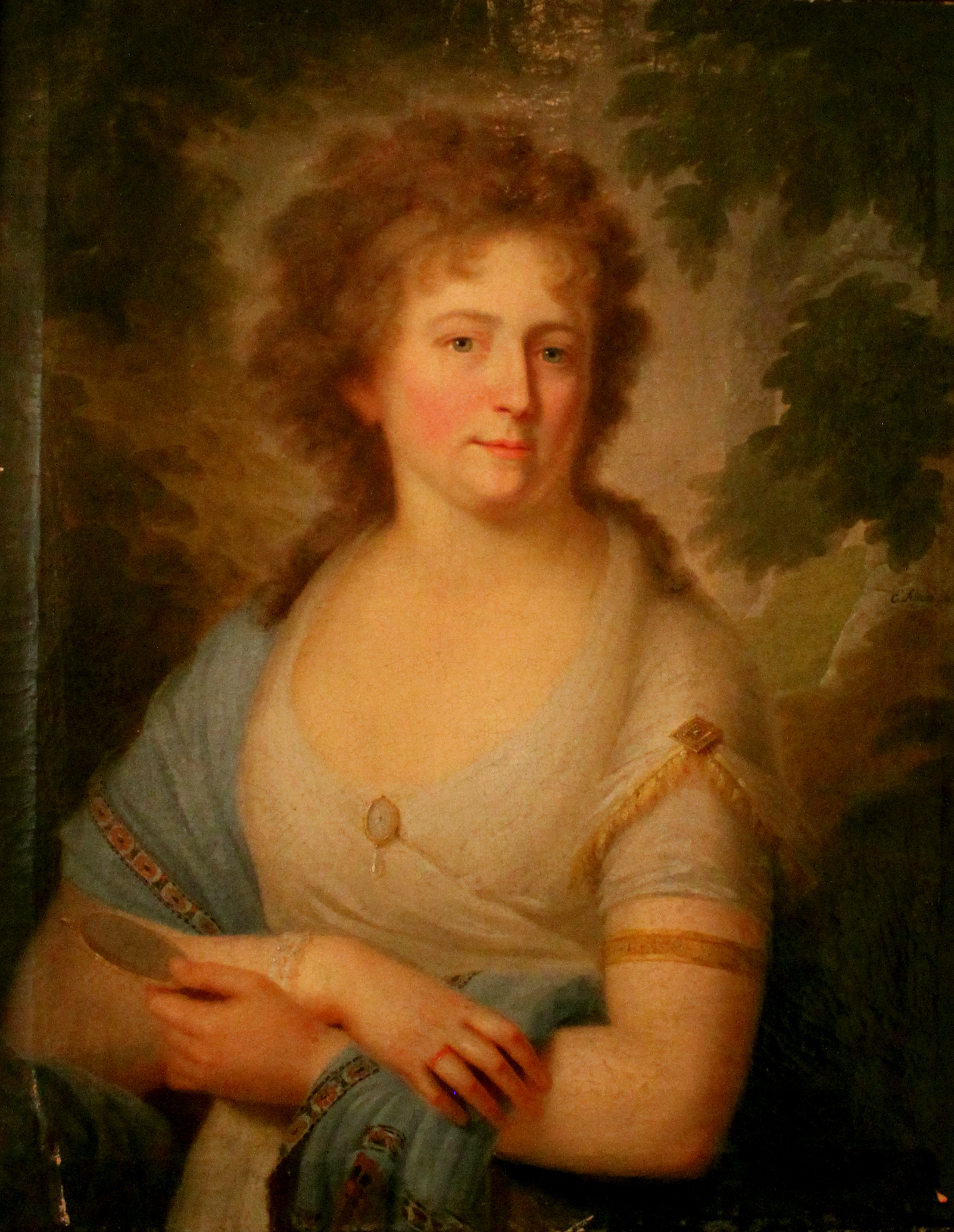
Eduard Joseph d'Alton - Portrait of a woman, 19th century

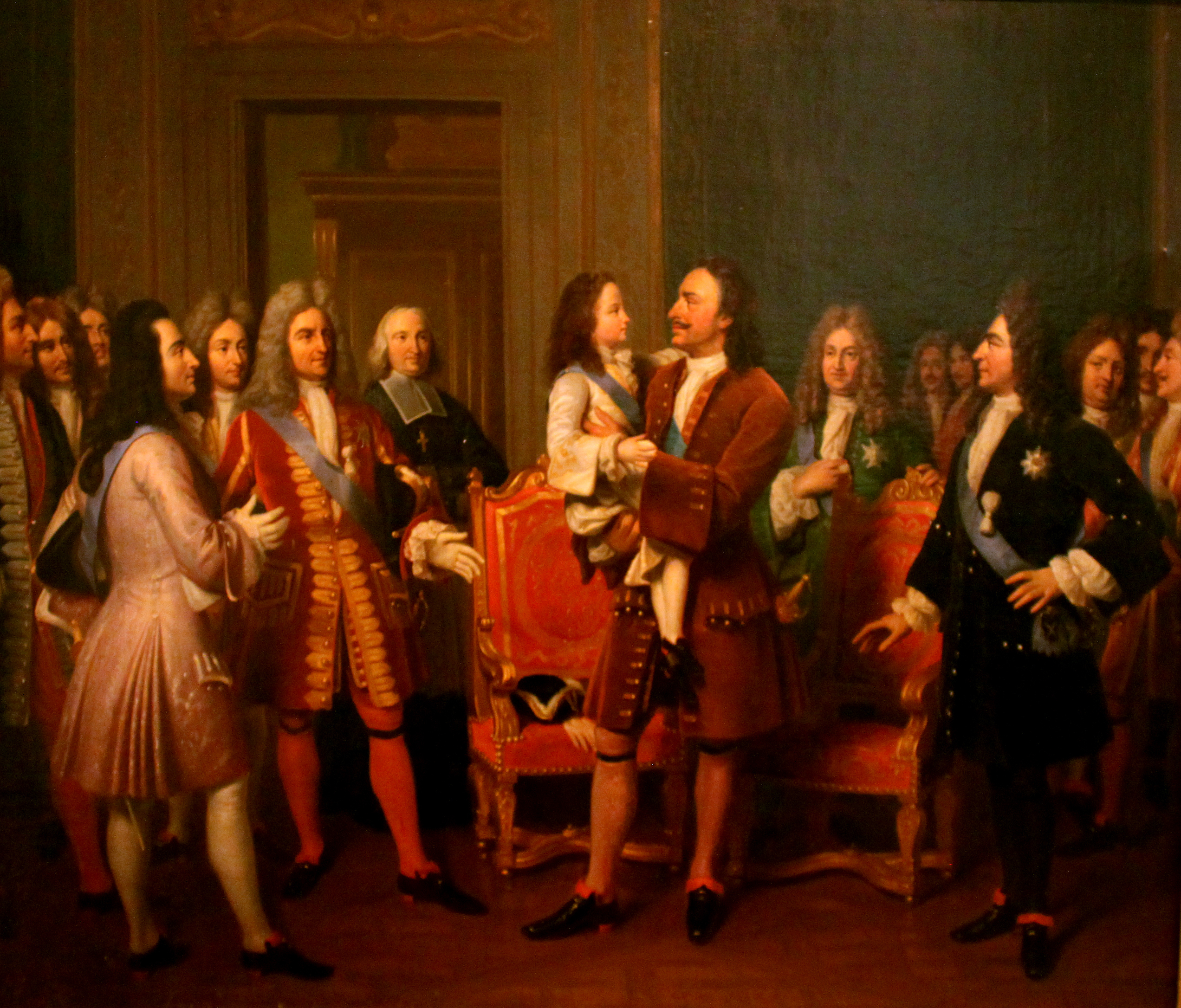
Louis Hersent - Peter I of Russia and Louis XV of France

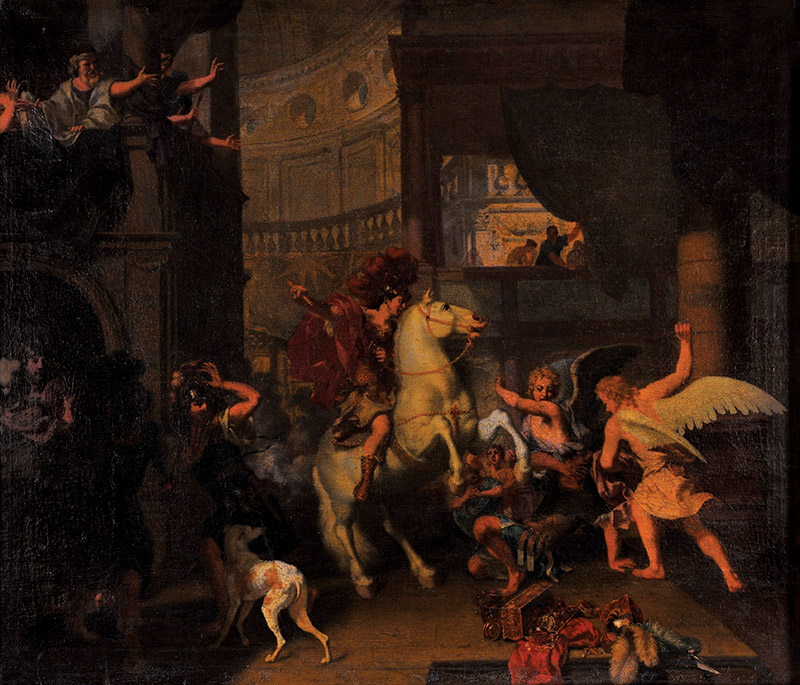
Charles Le Brun - Banishment of Iliadore

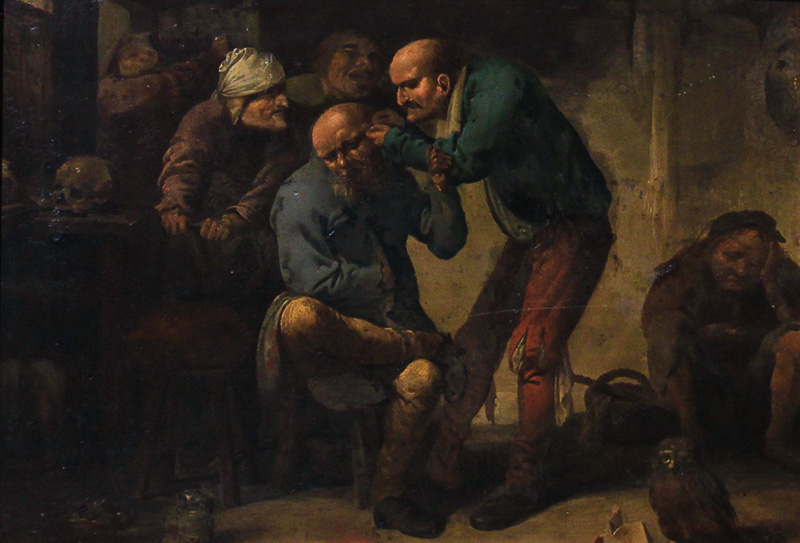
Adriaen Brouwer - Scene at a surgeon, 17th century

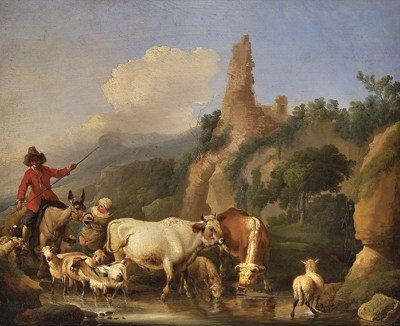
Johann Heinrich Roos - Herd, 1676

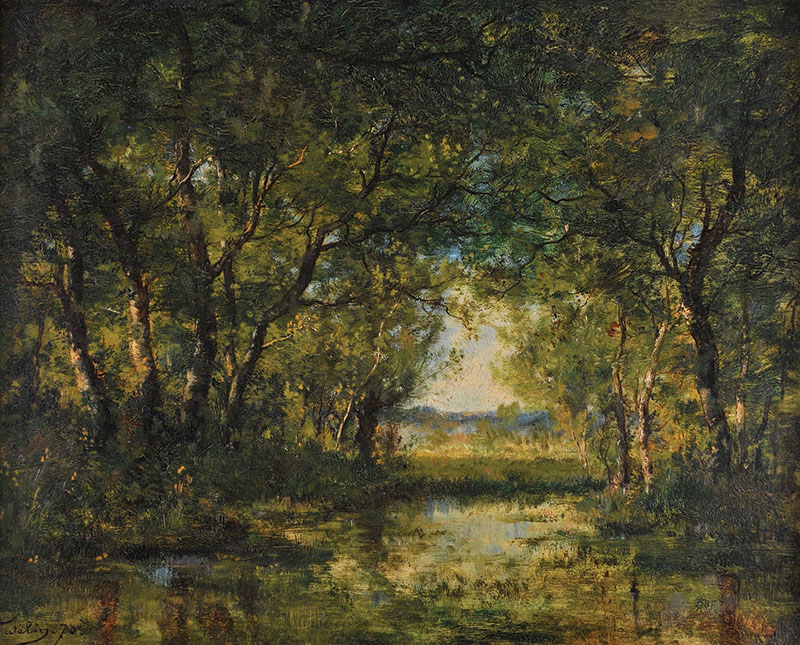
Louis Victor Watelin - Landscape, 1873

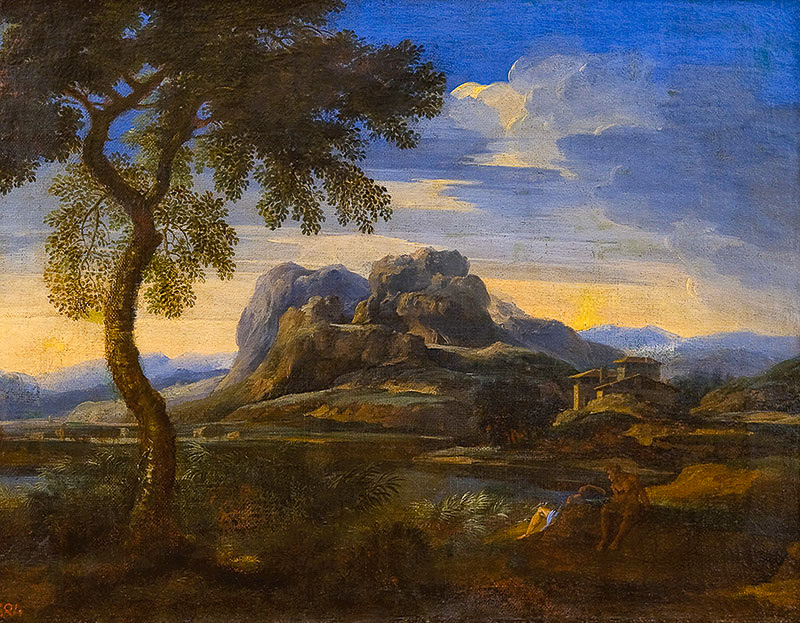
Gaspard Dughet - Landscape

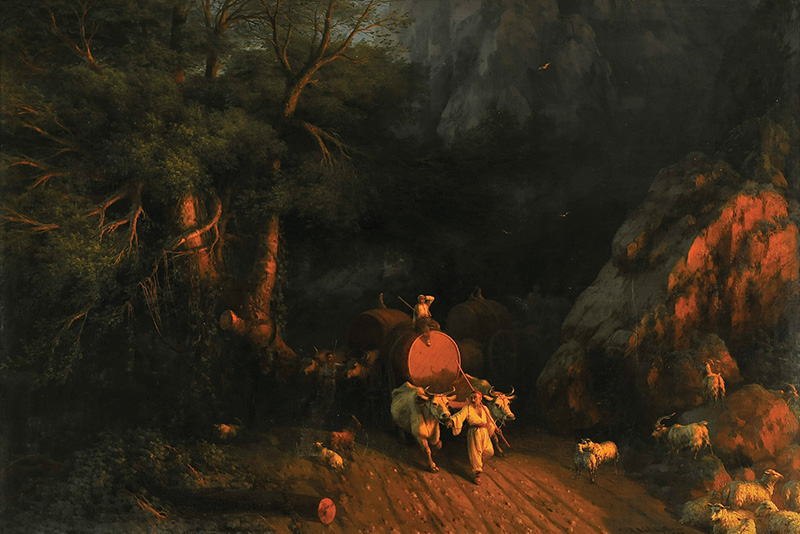
Ivan Aivazovsky - The road in the woods, 1857

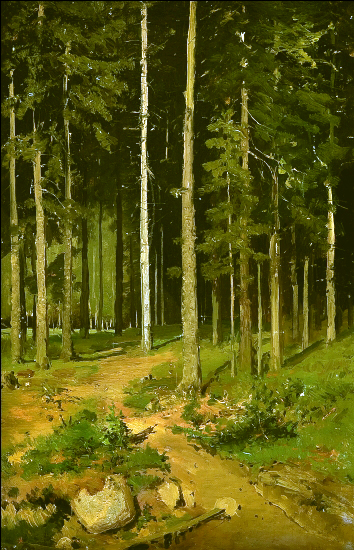
Ivan Shishkin - The road in the woods

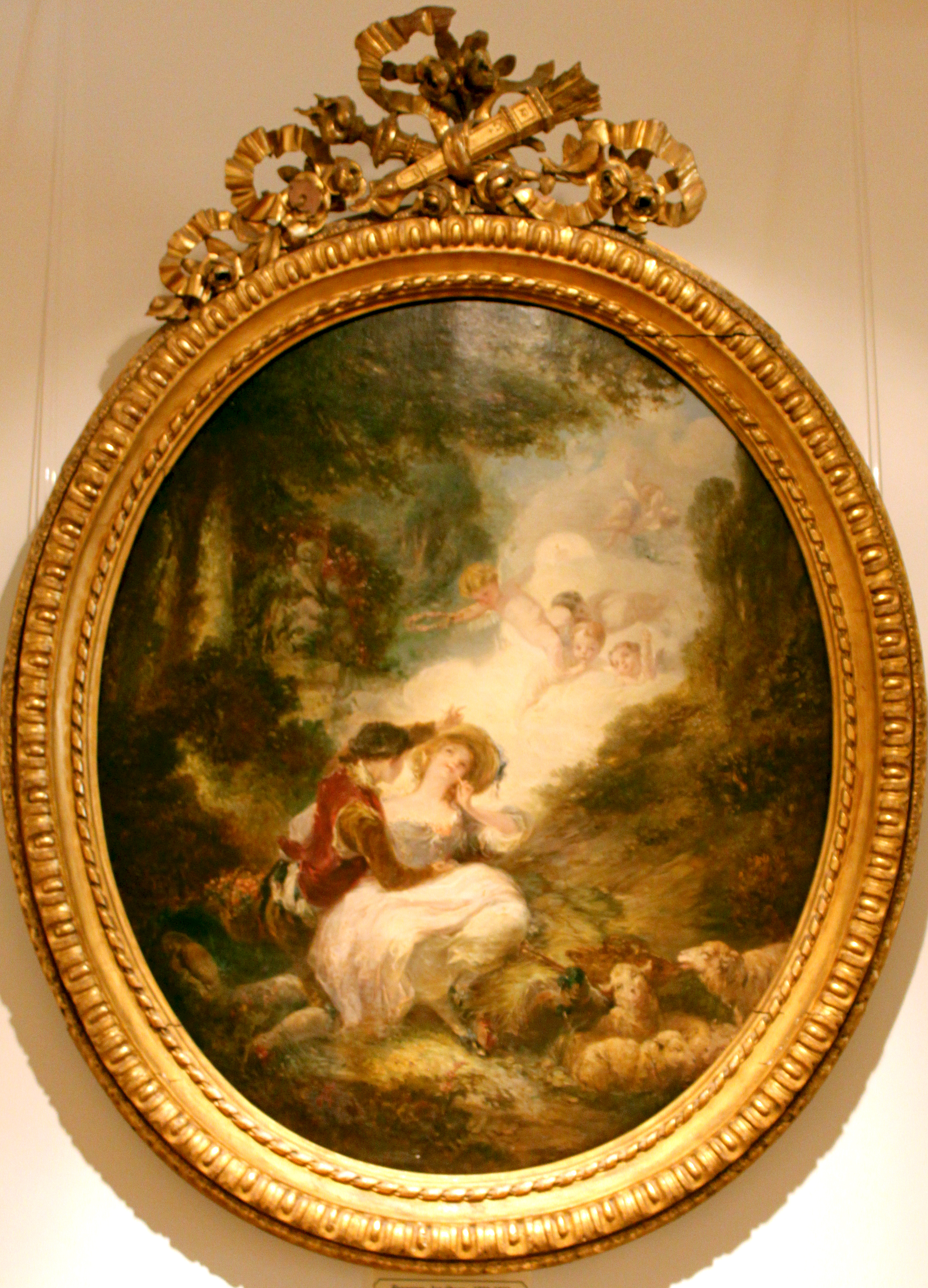
Jean-Honoré Fragonard - Pastorale

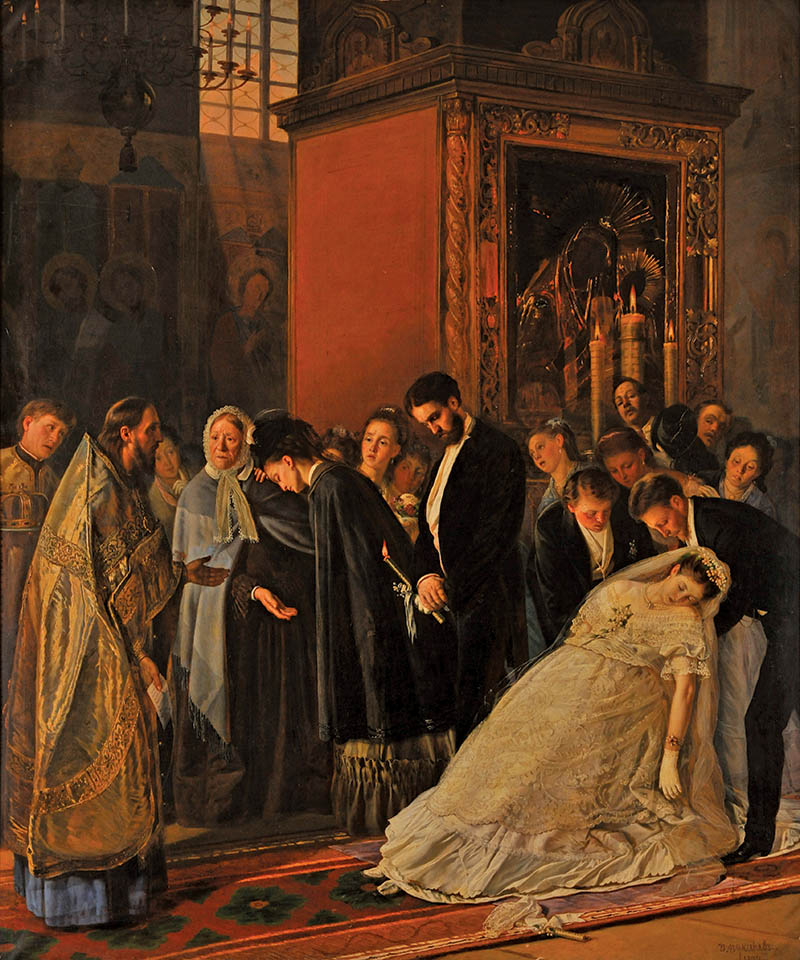
Vasili Pukirev - Interrupted wedding

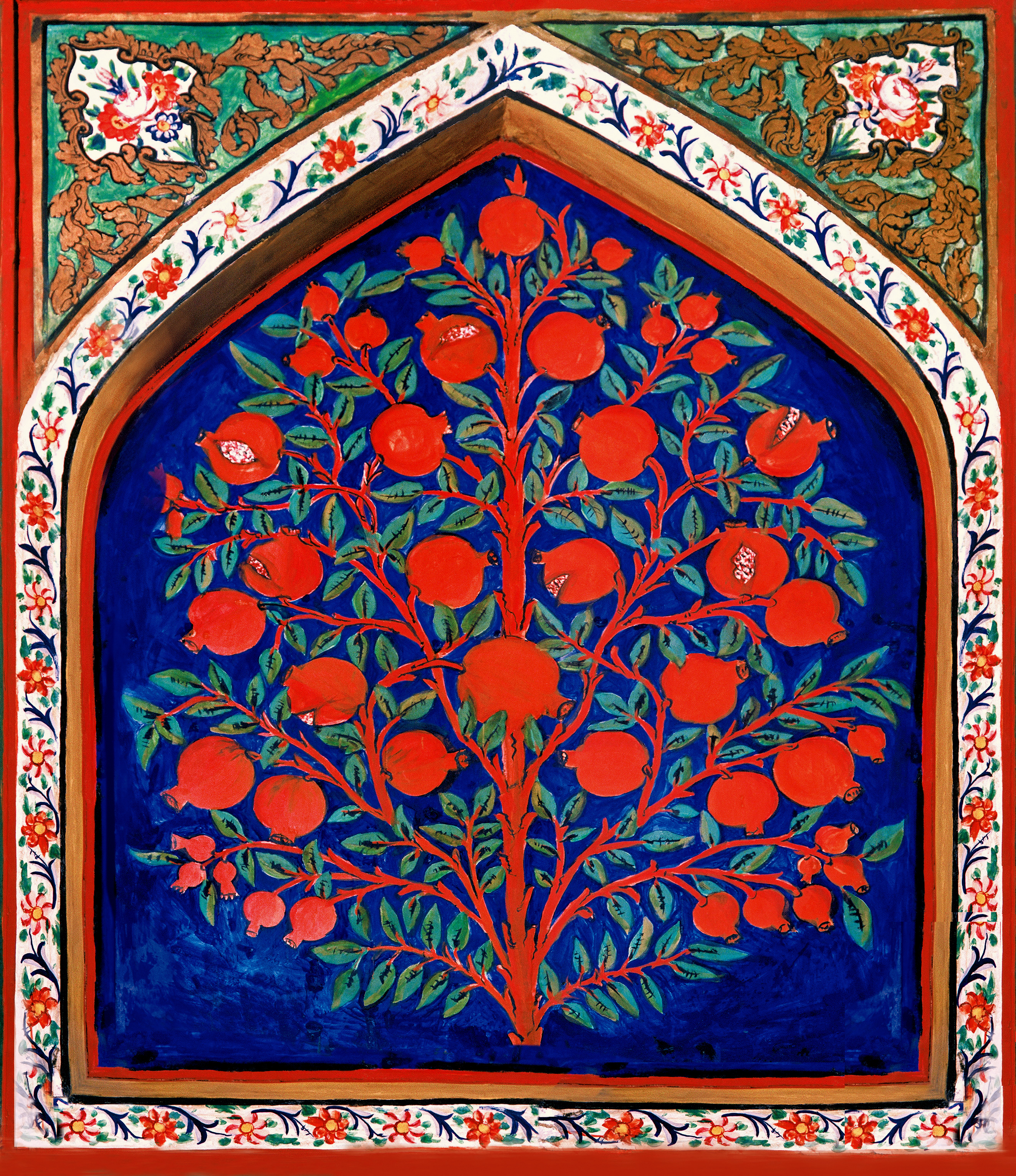
Usta Gambar Karabakhi - Tree of life

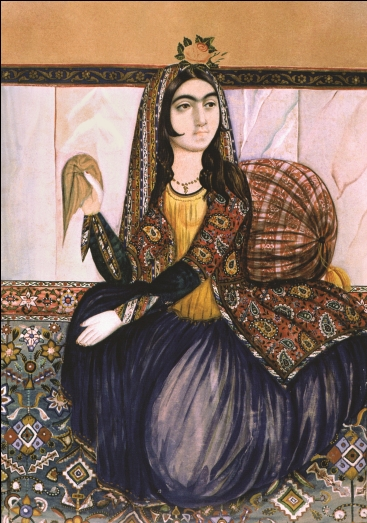
Mirza Kadym Irevani - Portrait of sitting woman, 1870

== See also ==
- Palace of De Boure
- List of museums in Azerbaijan
- Baku Museum of Modern Art
