= Art Museum of Georgia =

Museum in Tbilisi, Georgia

Coordinates: 41°41′49.28″N 44°48′2.6″E

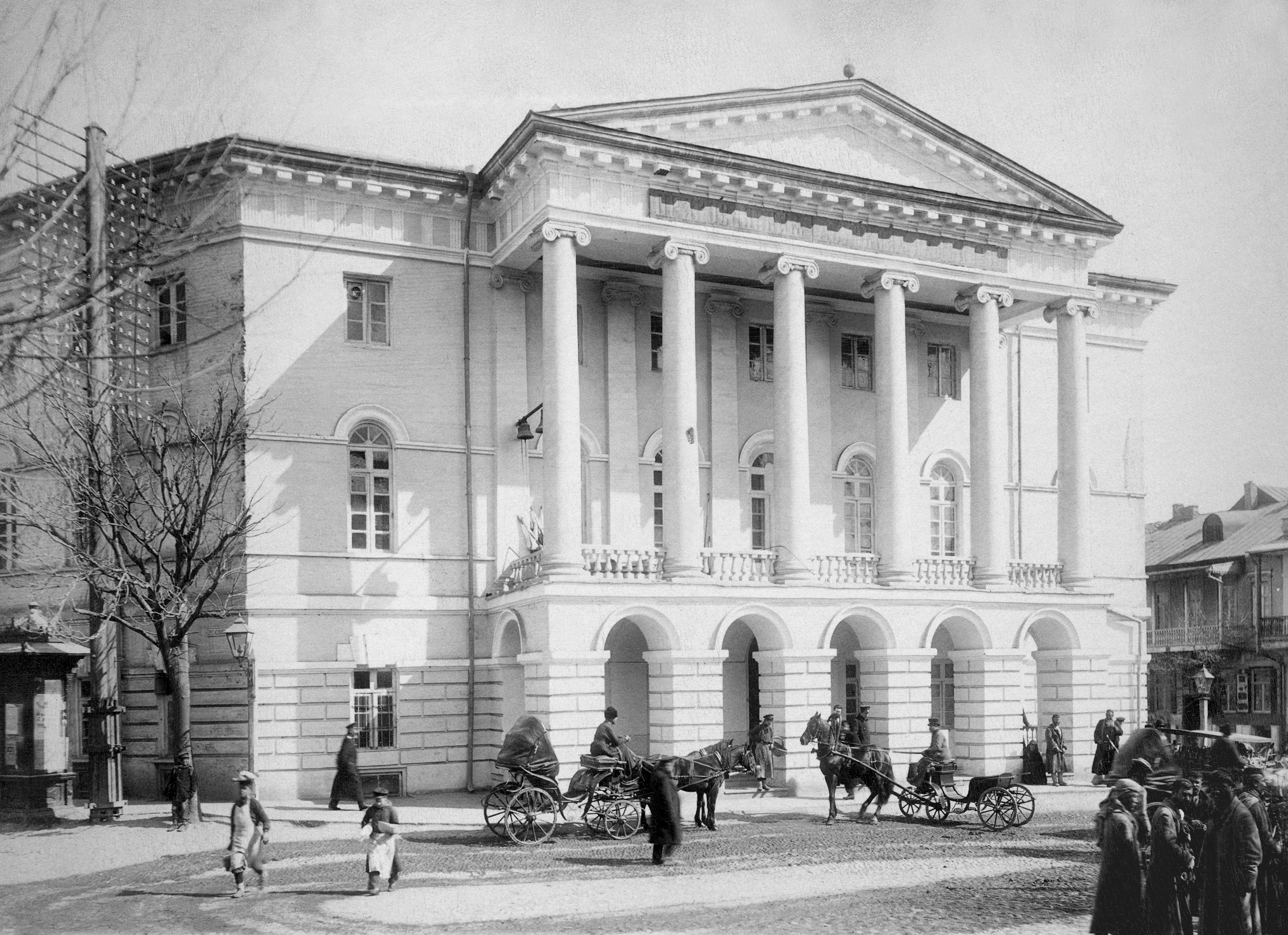
- Building of the Georgian Art Museum. Photo by Dmitri Ivanovich Yermakov (1846–1916)
- Former name: National Art Gallery
- Established: February 1, 1920
- Location: Tbilisi, Georgia (country)
- Website: Museum of Fine Arts

The Art Museum of Georgia (AMG) (Georgian: საქართველოს ხელოვნების მუზეუმი, sak'art'velos khelovnebis muzeumi), alternatively known as Shalva Amiranashvili Museum of Fine Arts, is one of the leading museums in the country of Georgia. Falling under the umbrella of the Georgian National Museum, AMG is located near Freedom Square, Tbilisi and possesses around 140,000 items of Georgian, Oriental, Russian, and other European art.

== History ==
A predecessor of the present-day museum, the National Art Gallery, was opened through the efforts of Western-educated young Georgian artists in Tbilisi (Tiflis) on February 1, 1920. Out of it grew the Central Museum of Fine Arts, which was opened in Tbilisi in August 1923. Additional material came from various smaller collections. At the end of 1932, the museum was relocated in the center of the old city on the site of the 13th-century Metekhi church.

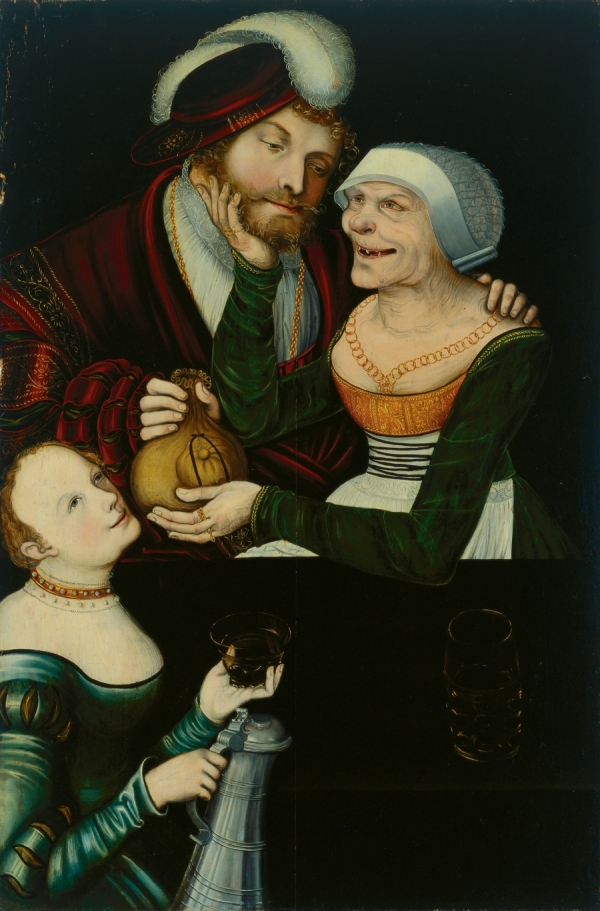
"The Procuress", a 16-century painting by Lucas Cranach the Elder was stolen and remained missing for a decade until 2004, when it was returned to the Georgian Art Museum.

In 1945, following a special agreement between the Soviet and French governments, numerous works of art constituting the National Treasury of Georgia – manuscripts, metalwork, jewelry, enamels, paintings – evacuated by the Georgian government-in-exile following the 1921 Red Army invasion, were returned to Tbilisi and added to the museum’s collection. The eminent Georgian art historian Shalva Amiranashvili (after whom the museum is currently named), who was to head the museum for more than thirty years, played an important role in the formation of the collection.

The museum became officially known as the Art Museum of Georgia in 1950, the same year that it moved to the building it now occupies. Built in 1838 in neoclassic style, the building housed the Tiflis Theological Seminary during the Imperial Russian period.

The museum was placed, at the end of 2004, under the joint administration with several other museums, forming the Georgian National Museum.

== Collections ==
The spacious rooms of the museum building house the permanent collection, consisting of sections of Georgian, Oriental, Russian, and European art.

The most important of the museum’s collections is naturally that of Georgian art, illustrating the development of the national artistic culture over many centuries from ancient times to the present. The Oriental section comes next in its size and importance, and is one of the largest in the post-Soviet countries. Pieces of Persian fine arts, particularly Qajar art, is probably the most significant part of the Oriental collection. It includes several miniatures of Persian court artists – images of court beauties, and portraits of shahs and noblemen.

The museum often holds temporary exhibitions of works from other collections in the country and abroad.
