= List of Azerbaijani painters =

This is a list of Azerbaijani painters.

== A–K ==
- Ahad Hosseini
- Alakbar Rezaguliyev
- Ali Ibadullayev
- Arif Huseynov
- Asaf Jafarov
- Aydin Rajabov
- Ayyub Huseynov
- Azim Azimzade
- Bahruz Kangarli
- Boyukagha Mirzazade
- Elbey Rzaguliyev
- Farhad Khalilov
- Fuad Abdurahmanov
- Geysar Kashiyeva
- Haydar Hatemi
- Jalal Garyaghdi
- Kazem Ordoobadi

== L–Z ==
- Maral Rahmanzadeh
- Mikayil Abdullayev
- Mirza Gadim Iravani
- Museyib Amirov
- Sattar Bahlulzade
- Semyon Bilmes
- Shmavon Mangasarov
- Sughra Baghirzada
- Togrul Narimanbekov
- Tahir Salahov
- Ujal Hagverdiyev
- Usta Gambar Karabakhi
- Vidadi Narimanbekov

== See also ==
- List of Azerbaijani artists
- List of Azerbaijani women artists
- Art of Azerbaijan
