= Azerbaijani art =

Azerbaijani art (Azerbaijani: Azərbaycan təsviri sənəti) is art created on the territory of what now makes up the Republic of Azerbaijan. There are many types of art to be found on Azerbaijan's territory, the major part of which being applied art items. This form of art, rooted in antiquity, is represented by a wide range of handicrafts, such as chasing (metalworking), jewelry-making, engraving, carving wood, stone, and bone, carpet-making, lacing, pattern weaving and printing, and knitting and embroidery.

== Prehistoric art ==
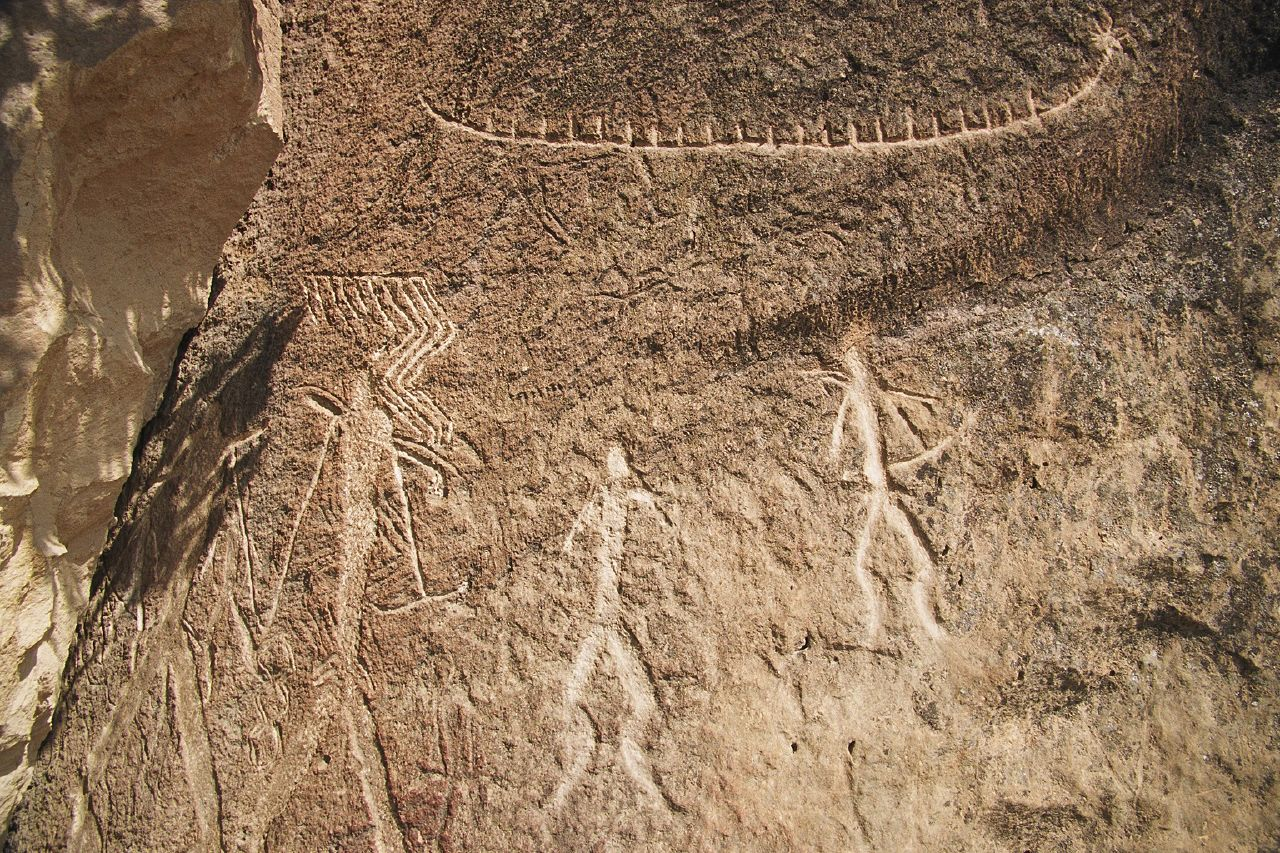
Rock paintings in Gobustan

Images reflecting magic, totemic notions of ancient people, their religious customs, and hunting scenes carved on rocks in Gobustan are evidence of primitive art created in the Paleolithic epoch. Carvings of men and women, fishing scenes, images of people dancing on the rocks, galloping horses, hunters, a lonely figure of a reaper with a sickle, round dances like the yalli (folk dance), boats with rowers, solar signs and various wild animals have been portrayed and found there.

Gamigaya Petroglyphs in the Ordubad District region date back from the fourth to the first centuries BC. About 1,500 dislodged and carved rock paintings with images of deer, goats, bulls, dogs, snakes, birds, fantastic beings, people, carriages, and various symbols have been discovered carved on basalt rocks.

== Middle Ages ==
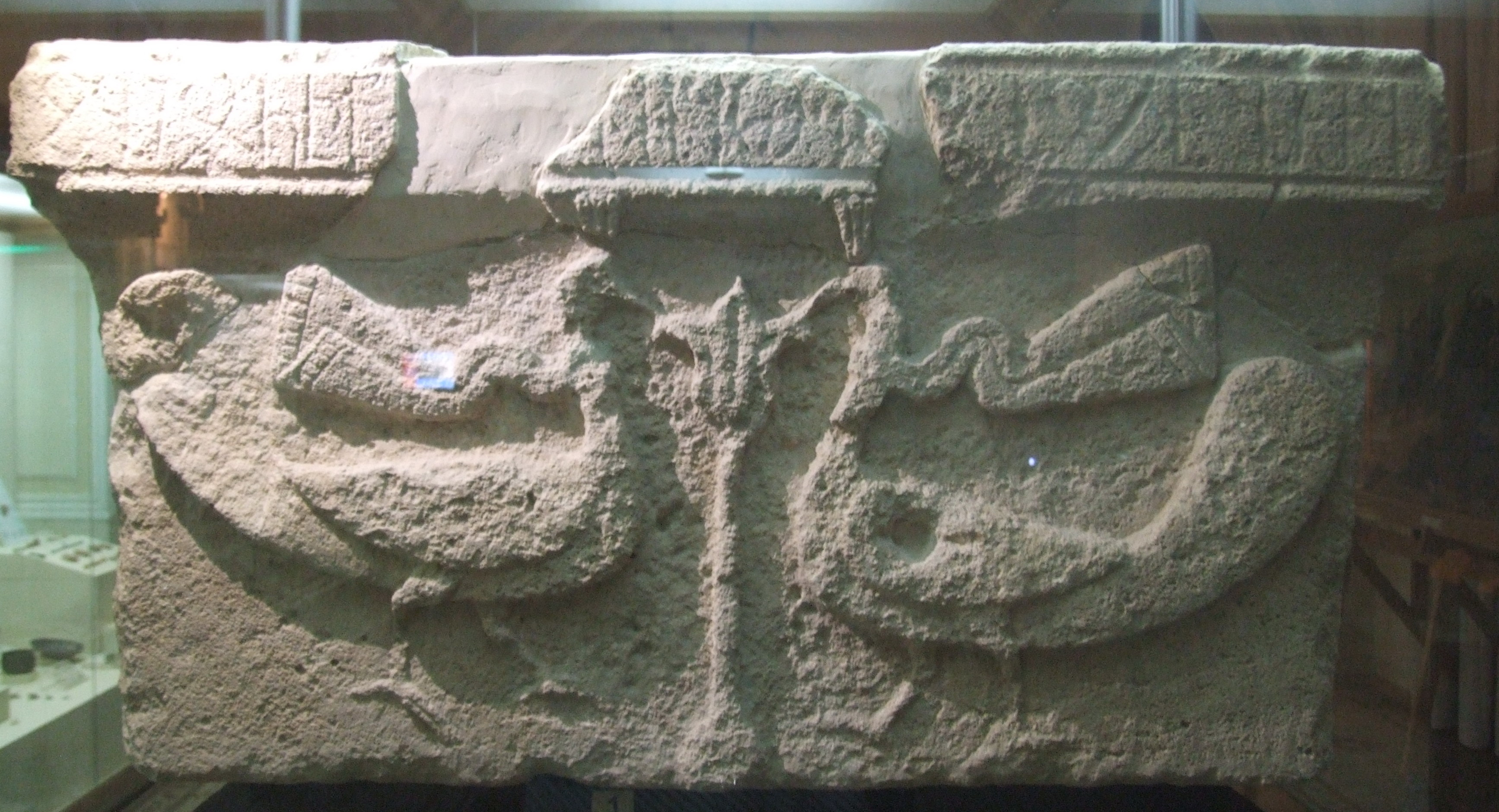
The stone cap of the 5th–6th centuries discovered in a temple in the Sudagilan settlement of the Mingachevir District with an inscription in Caucasian Albanian language

The development of old and the appearance of new cities favoured the development of caravan trade and the expansion of handicraft production. Many cities are famed for rug weaving and the production of artistic ceramic jars, gold and silver items.

A stone cap from the 5th–6th centuries discovered in the Sudagilan settlement of Mingachevir District is one of the most famous findings of that time. A cup discovered in the village of Bartim, dating from the second to fourth centuries is kept in the Moscow Museum of History.

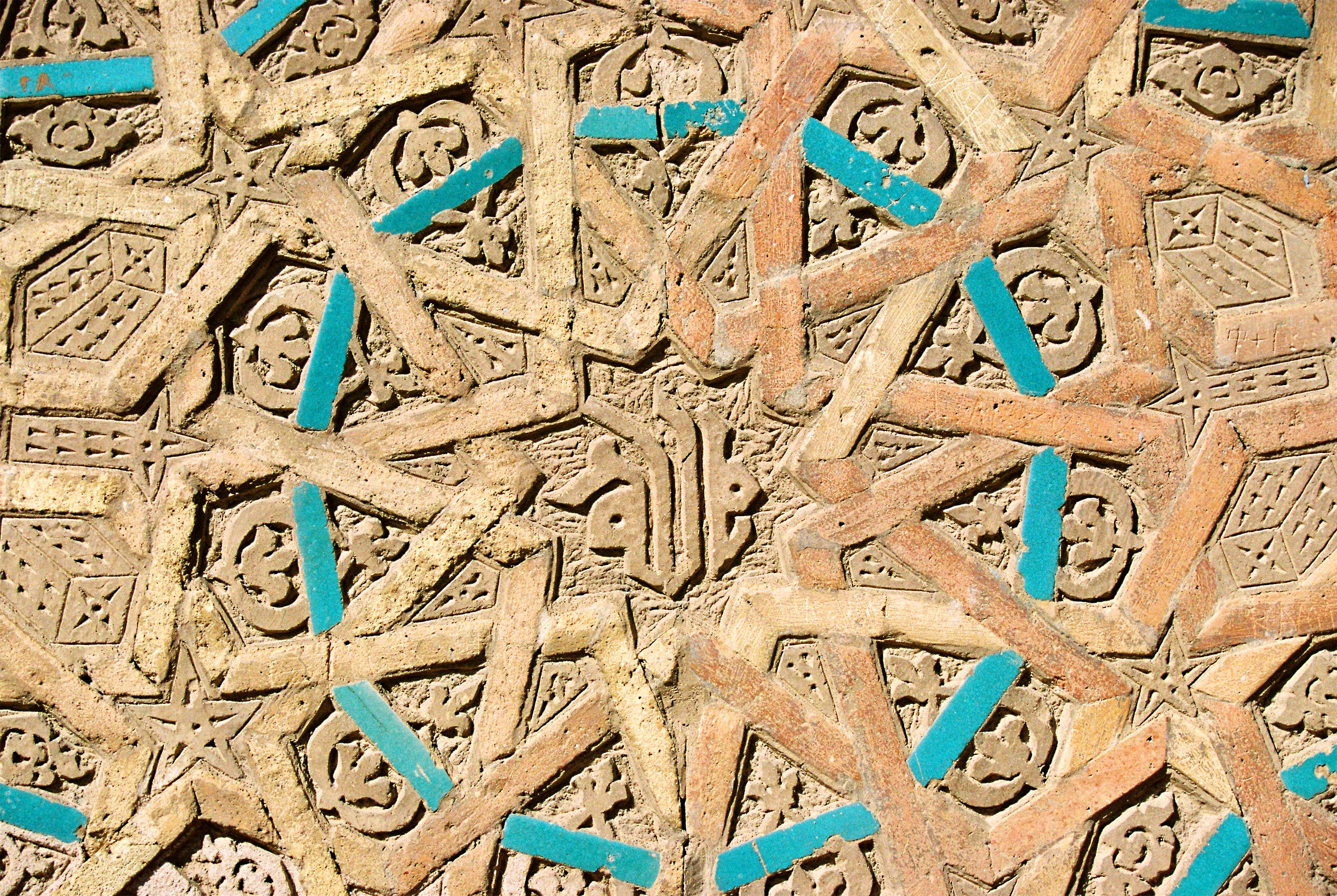
Ornament from the Momine Khatun Mausoleum in Nakhchivan, 12th century

The seizure of Caucasian Albania by Arabs in the seventh century was of great importance to the further development of the visual arts. Muslim, Iranian and Arabic cultures began to spread in the territory of modern Azerbaijan. The construction of mosques, mausoleums, castles, and other cultic architectural monuments followed, decorated with various patterns and ornaments, calligraphic elements (on epitaphs), tile and bas-reliefs Islamic restrictions on the portrayal of living beings stimulated the development of ornamental forms of decorative arts. Ornaments on the Momine Khatun Mausoleum in Nakhchivan, constructed in the epoch of the Seljuq and Khanegah on the shore of the Pirsaat River are monuments from that time.

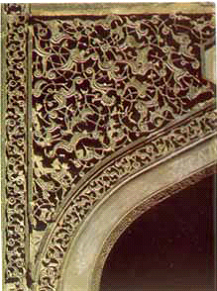
"Divankhana". A fragment of a decoration. Palace of the Shirvanshahs in Baku, 15th century.

Small states appeared in the territory of Azerbaijan after the weakening of Arab Caliphate. Local art schools were opened in cities such as Barda, Shamakhi, Beylagan, Ganja, Nakhchivan and Shabran. Architectural schools in Nakchivan, Shirvan-Absheron and Tabriz are the most important among them. Monuments and buildings of the "Nakhchivan school" are distinguished by their ceramic details, which were one-colour initially, but then became multi-coloured. Ornamental motifs generally consisted of baked brick and tile. Smooth stone walls were rarely used in architectural elements belong to the "Shirvan-Absheron" architectural school. Patterns of stone carving art, geometric and plant ornaments have an important place in buildings belonging to this school of architecture.

The artistic value of "divankhana" (rotunda-pavilion) from the Palace of the Shirvanshahs ensemble "is determined by the perfection of the composition, tectonics of architectural forms, the virtuosity of painting and creation of ornaments" according to L.Bretatsinki and B.Weymarn.

Stones with inscriptions and images of people and animals (tiger, camel, horse, bull and bird) have been found in the Shirvanshahs' architectural monument called Sabayil Castle constructed in the 13th century in Baku Bay. A deep carving style was a characteristics of friezes. This monument has a pattern of sculptural art where inscriptions and salient images was a decisive factor in the decorative design of buildings. Cultural traditions of ancient Caucasian Albania are preserved in the stone reliefs.

The Bayil stones, which had the characteristics of friezes, included decorative elements on grand architectural monuments at that time.

Ceramic items discovered during archaeological excavations in Shabran and Baylagan provide evidence of the high-level development of visual arts in the Middle Ages.

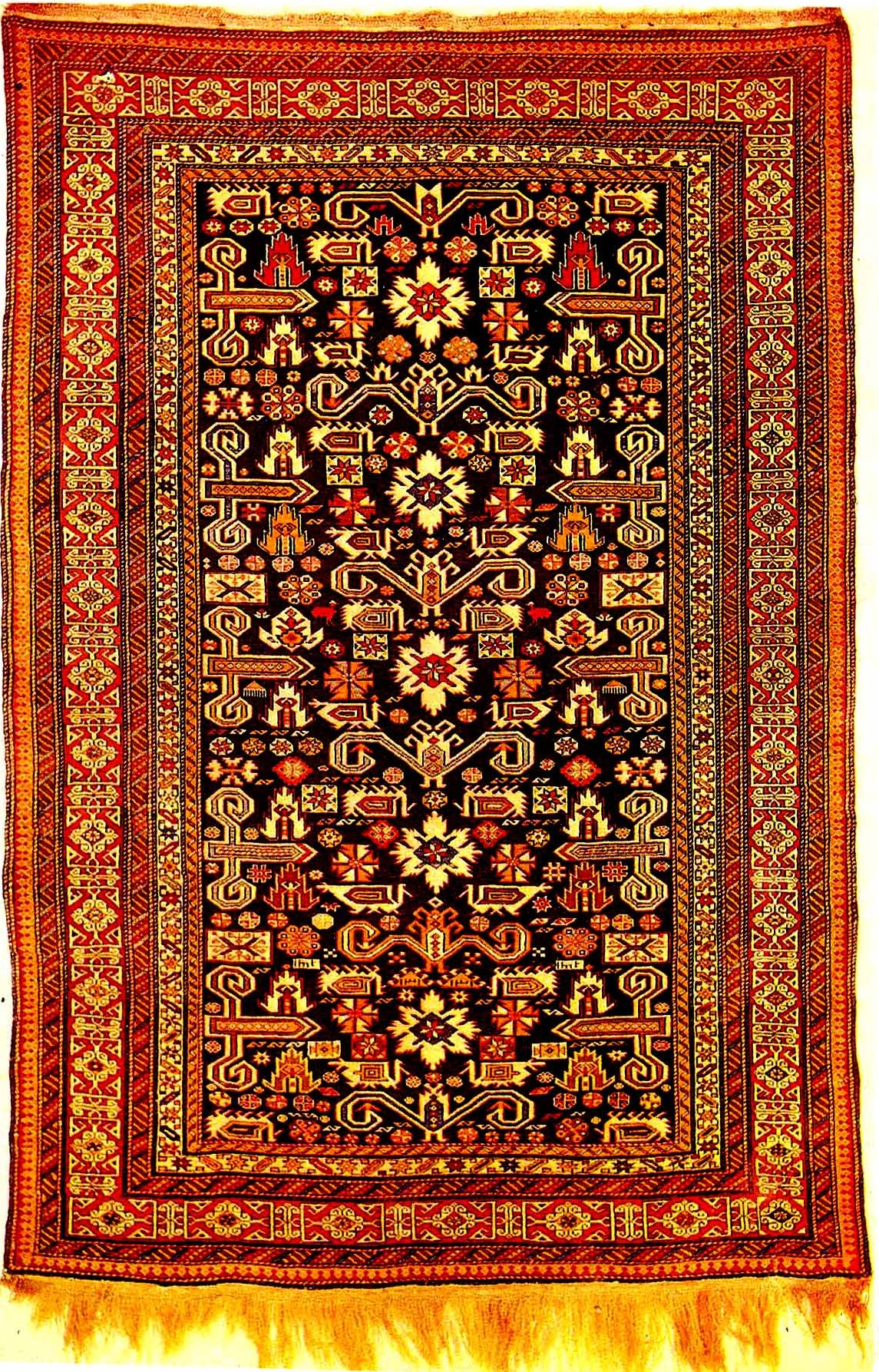

== 19th to early 20th centuries ==
=== Decorative art ===
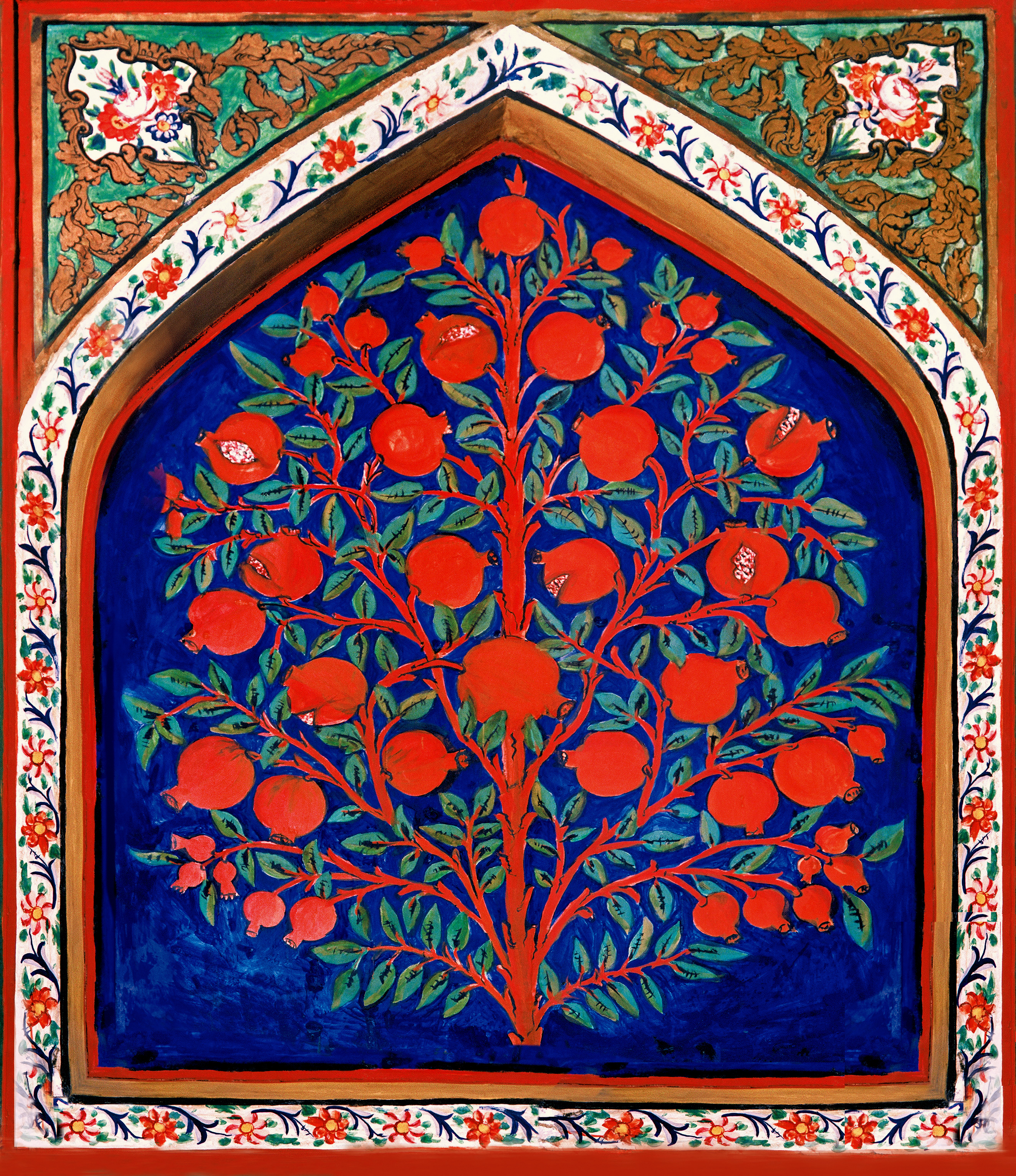
Tree of life by Usta Gambar Karabakhi

From the 19th century to early 20th century several artists of the decorative arts who had no formal artistic education became famous. One, Mir Mohsun Navvab who also known as a poet, music theorist and calligrapherwas among the most famous artists of that time. His creations are important in art sphere. Ornamental wall paintings, images of flowers and birds, illustrations to his own manuscripts (Bahr-ul Khazan (The sea of sorrow), 1864) are typical of his creativity.

Usta Gambar Garabaghi represents the national traditions of wall-painting (1830s–1905). He is famed for his works in the restoration of the Palace of Shaki Khans, paintings in the interiors of houses in Mehmandarov and Rustamov in Shusha and other cities. Paintings made by him did not break up the flatness of walls but emphasized their architectural details. His new works were distinguished for the growth of realistic features.

Landscapes, images of flowers and patterns of decorative-applied art made by poet Khurshidbanu Natavan should also be noted. She also decorated her poems with lyric art motifs.

=== Easel painting ===
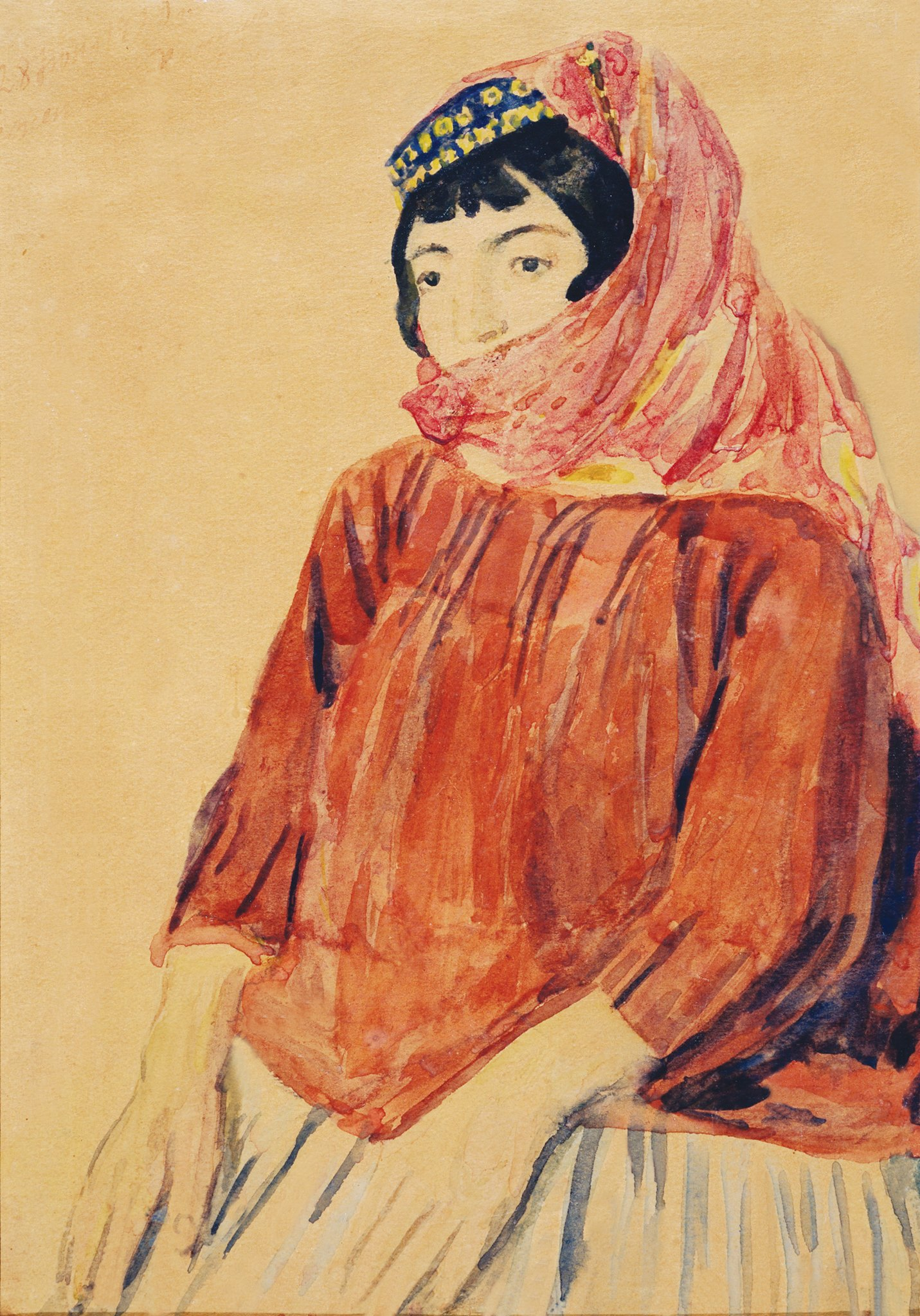
Refugee Woman by Bahruz Kangarli, 1920

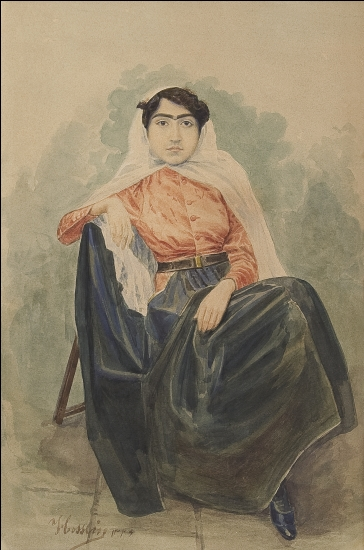
Azerbaijani woman by Abbas Huseyni, 1908

The new progressive visual arts of Azerbaijan faced a delay in development in the 19th century. The development of realistic easel painting was extremely slow.

The origins of easel painting in Azerbaijani visual arts began in this period, but works of the period such as portraits painted by painters such as Mir Mohsun Navvab "were still firmly connected to traditions of the eastern miniature of middle ages".

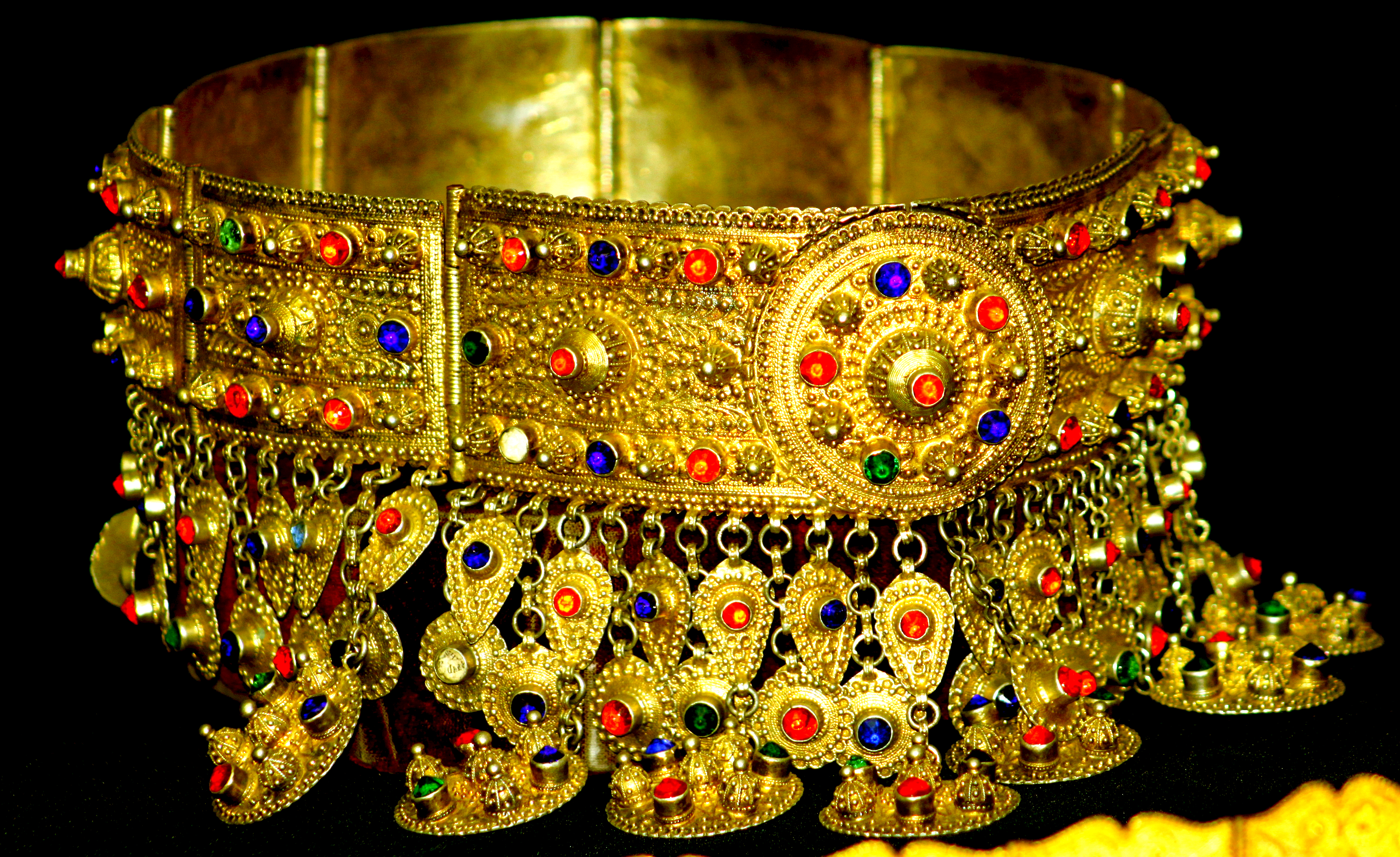
Golden Woman belt. Shabaka technique. National Museum of History of Azerbaijan.

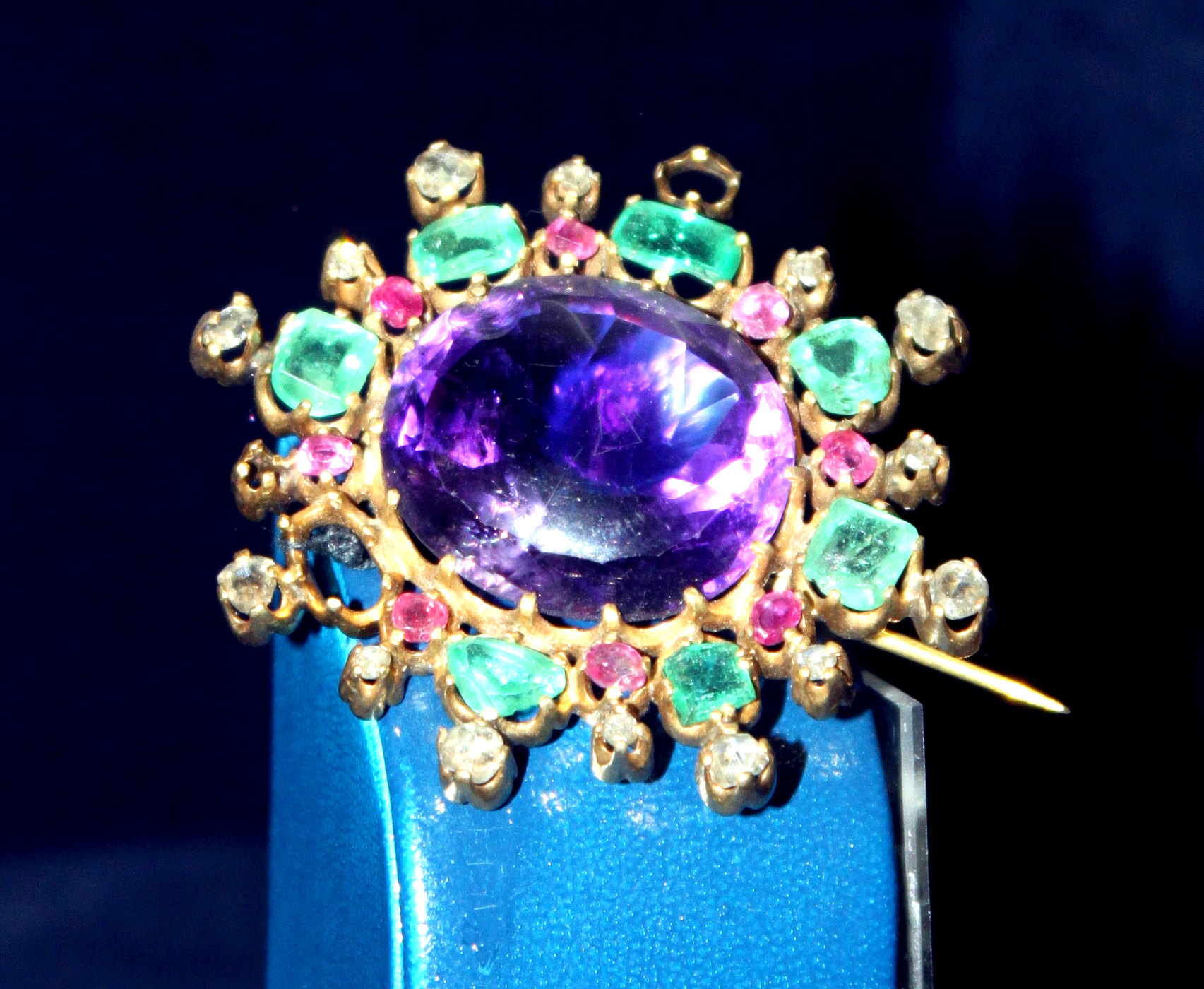
Golden brooch with diamond, emerald, ruby. National Museum of History of Azerbaijan.

Timur's Portrait by Mir Mohsun Navvab painted with watercolours in 1902 and now housed in the National Art Museum of Azerbaijan in Baku is also famous.

The genre of satiric graphics appeared with the publication of Molla Nasraddin magazine at the beginning of the 20th century and the development of book publishing. Artists of the magazine such as O.Schemrling, I.Rotter, A.Azimzade and K.Musayev actively worked in this sphere of arts. Azim Azimzade is a founder of satiric graphics of Azerbaijan. His sharp caricatures and grotesques scoffing at social inequality, ignorance, fanaticism and oppression by Tsarism are also famous. His series of watercolour paintings called Hundred Types, dedicated to freedom of women, atheism and political motifs, and also the illustrations of Mirza Alakbar Sabir's Hophopname collection of works are famous.

Bahruz Kangarli is the first Azerbaijani artist who got a professional education was one of the founders of the realistic easel arts of Azerbaijan He created landscapes such as Ilanly Mountain Under the Moonlight, Before the Dawn and Spring. He also created portraits of unfortunate people in his Refugees series and everyday life compositions Matchmaking and Wedding. His album Memory of Nakhchivan consisting of twenty landscapes is housed in the National Art Museum of Azerbaijan.

Kangarli drew outlines of costumes for Deadmen (J.Mammadguluzadeh), Haji Gara (M.F.Akhundov), Peri Jaud (A.Hagverdiyev) and other plays staged in Nakhchivan, in 1910.

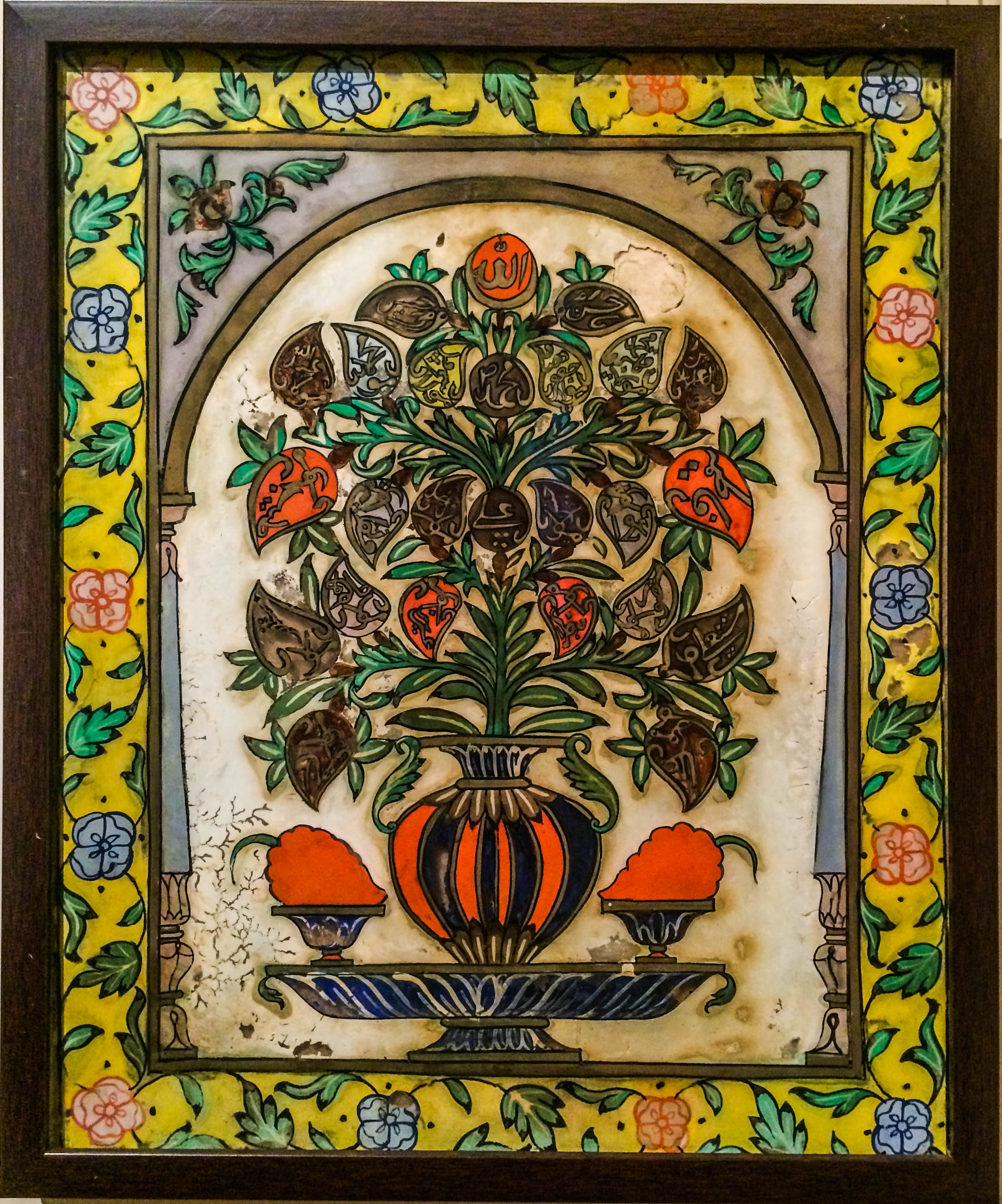
Tree of life, painting on glass. Karabakh. National Art Museum of Azerbaijan.

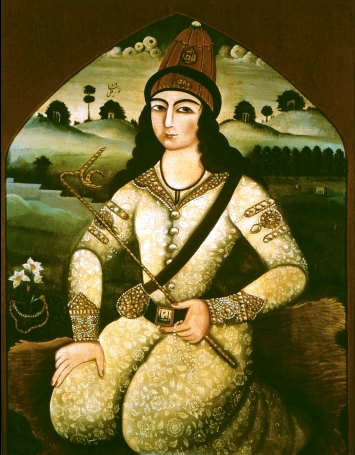
Unknown Azerbaijani artist – Portrait of Darvish Nurali Shah

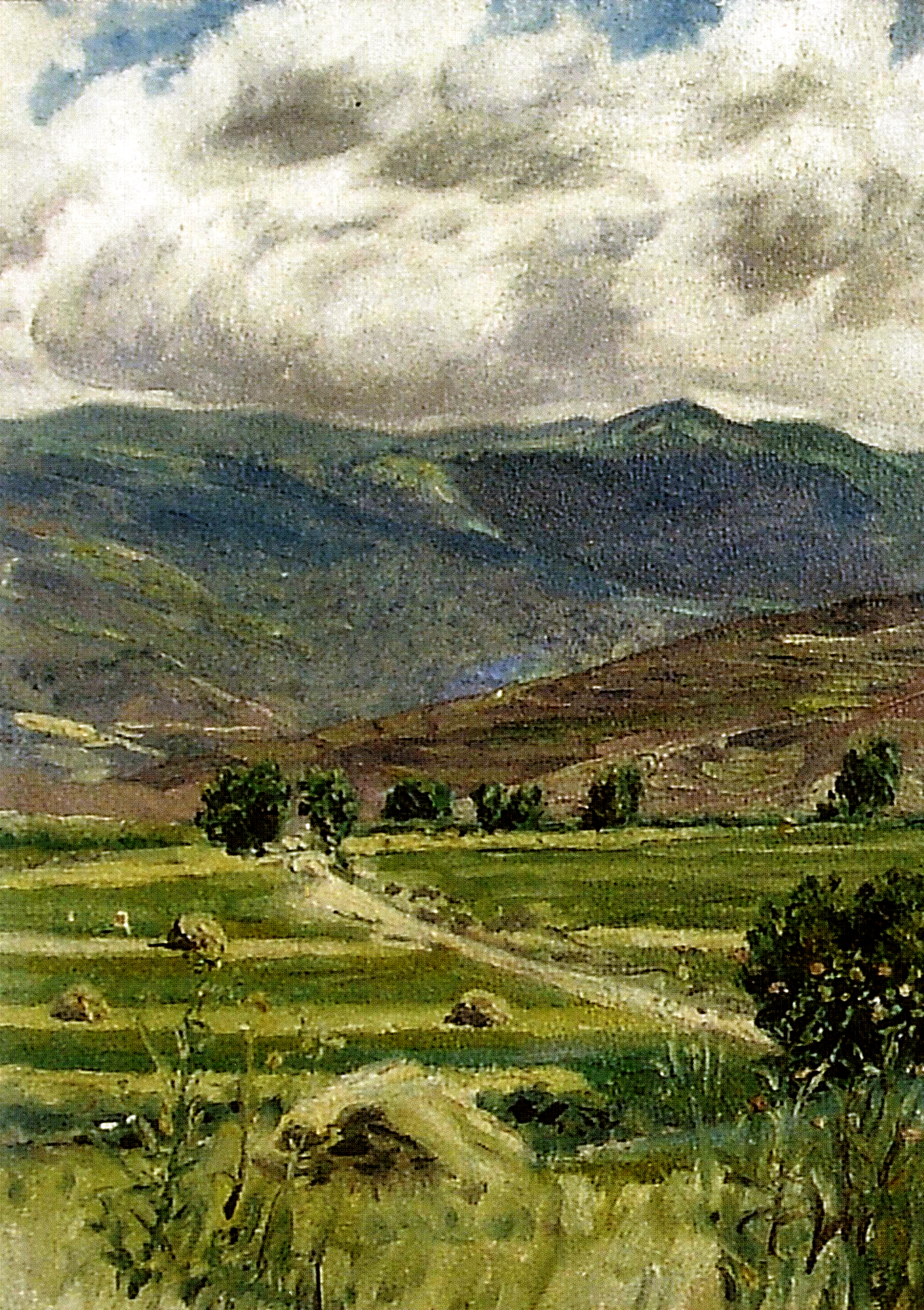
Landscape with mountains. Bahruz Kangarli. The early 20th century.

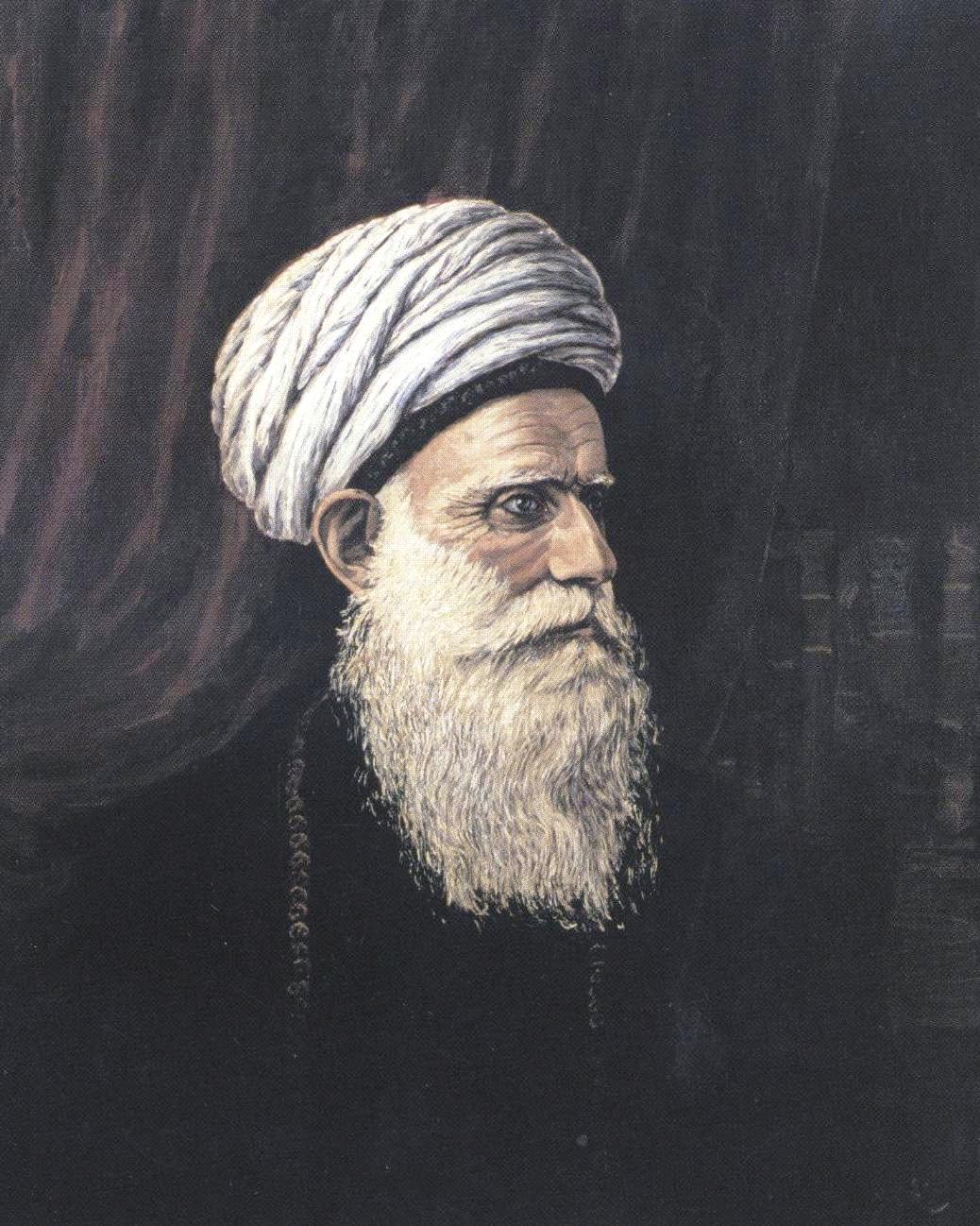
Portrait of Shaikh ul Islam. Ali bey Huseynzade. The early 20th century.

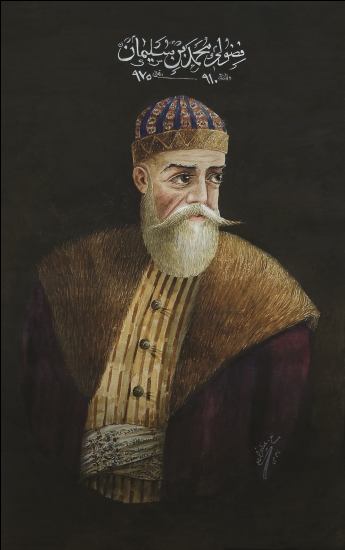
Portrait of Fuzuli. Azim Azimzade, 1914.

== Azerbaijani carpets ==
=== Azerbaijani rugs ===
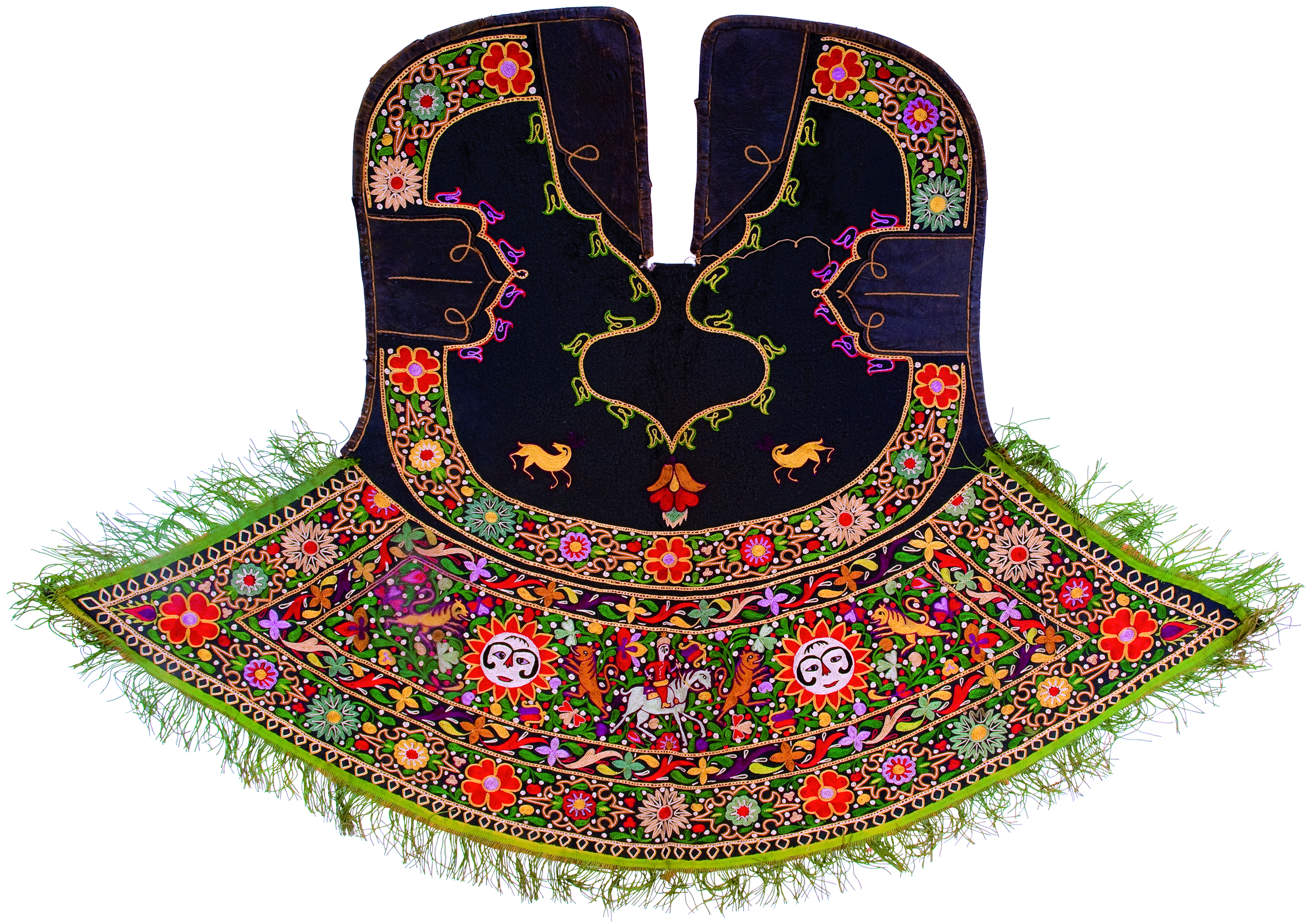
Azerbaijani Embroidery from Ganja

Azerbaijani carpets can be categorized into several large groups and a multitude of subgroups. Scientific research on the Azerbaijani carpet is connected to Latif Karimov, a prominent scientist and artist. He classified carpets into four large groups in four geographical zones of Azerbaijan, i.e. Guba-Shirvan, Ganja-Kazakh, Karabakh and Tabriz.

The Karabakh carpet is one of five ( major regional groups of carpets made in Azerbaijan named after the Karabakh region, which comprises present-day Nagorno-Karabakh and the adjacent lowland territories (lowland Karabakh).

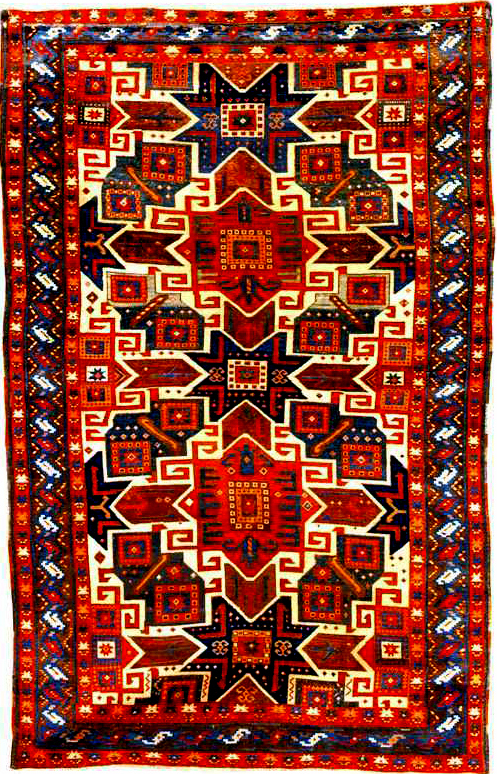
"Ulduzlu" carpet, Kazakh school, Azerbaijan Carpet Museum

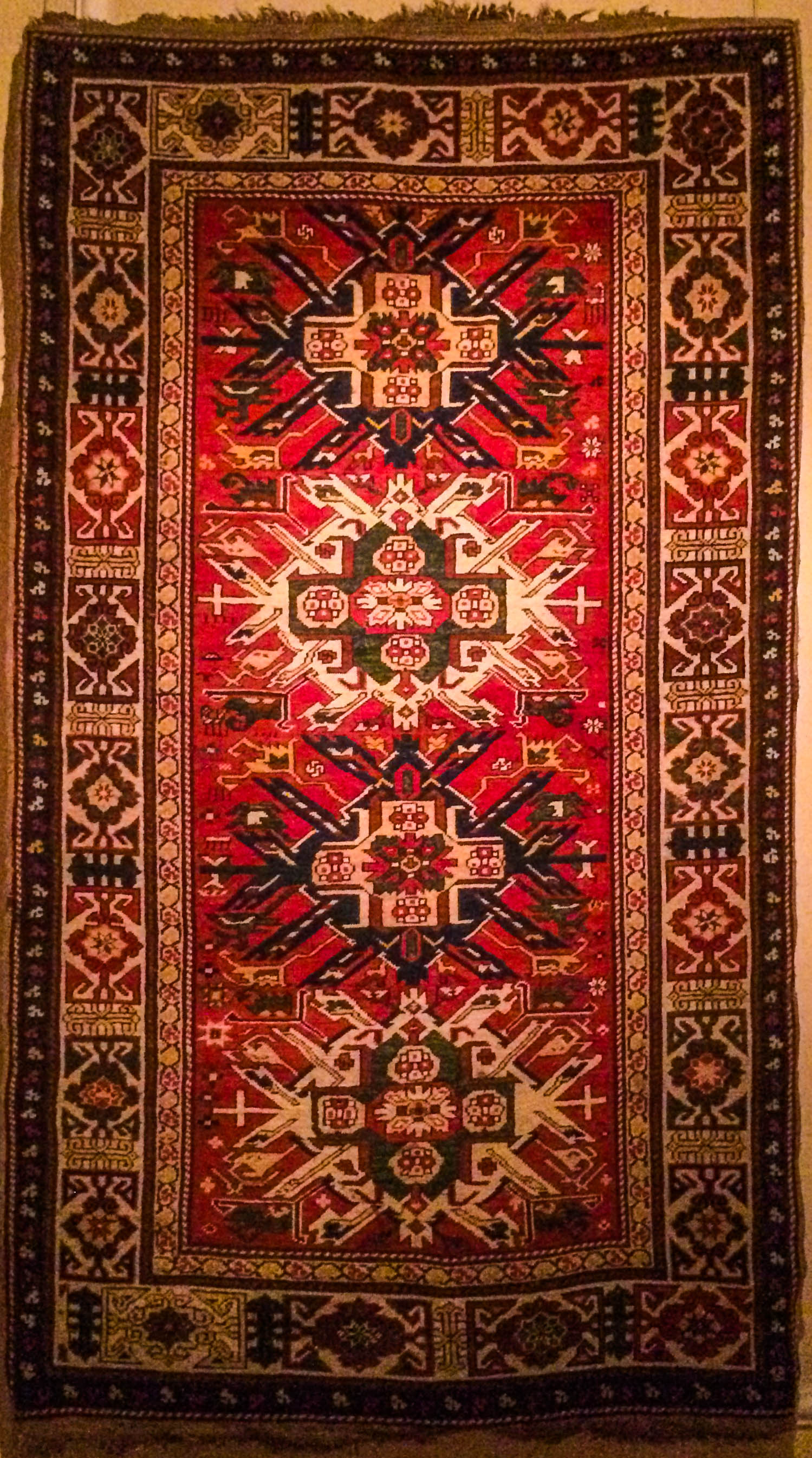
"Gövhər" carpet, Karabakh school, National Art Museum of Azerbaijan

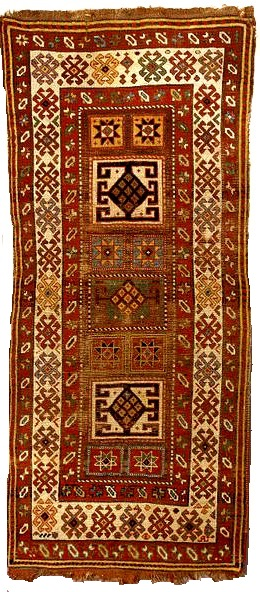
"Shamakhi" carpet, Shirvan school, Victoria and Albert Museum

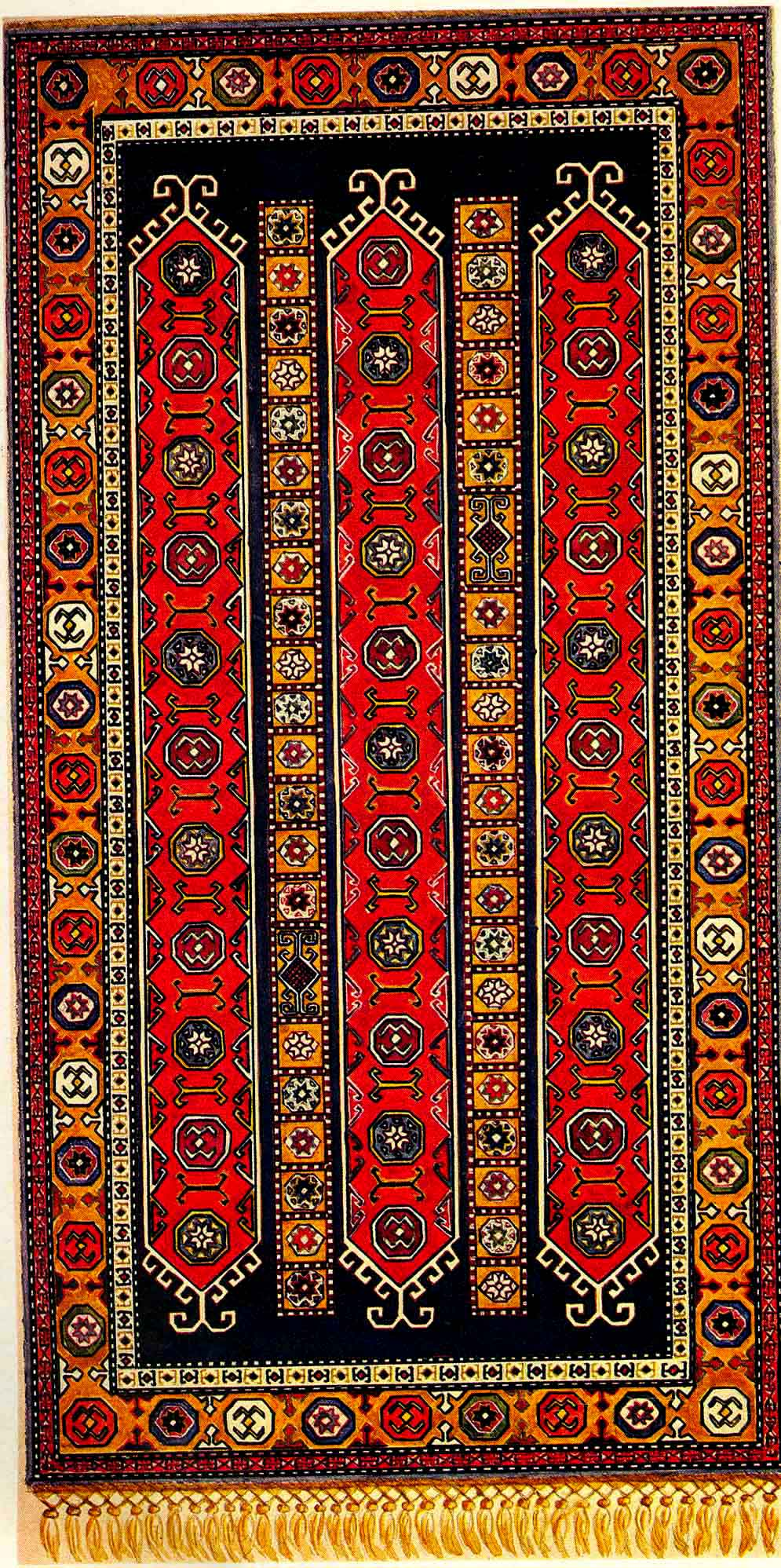
"Ganja" carpet, Ganja school, Azerbaijan Carpet Museum

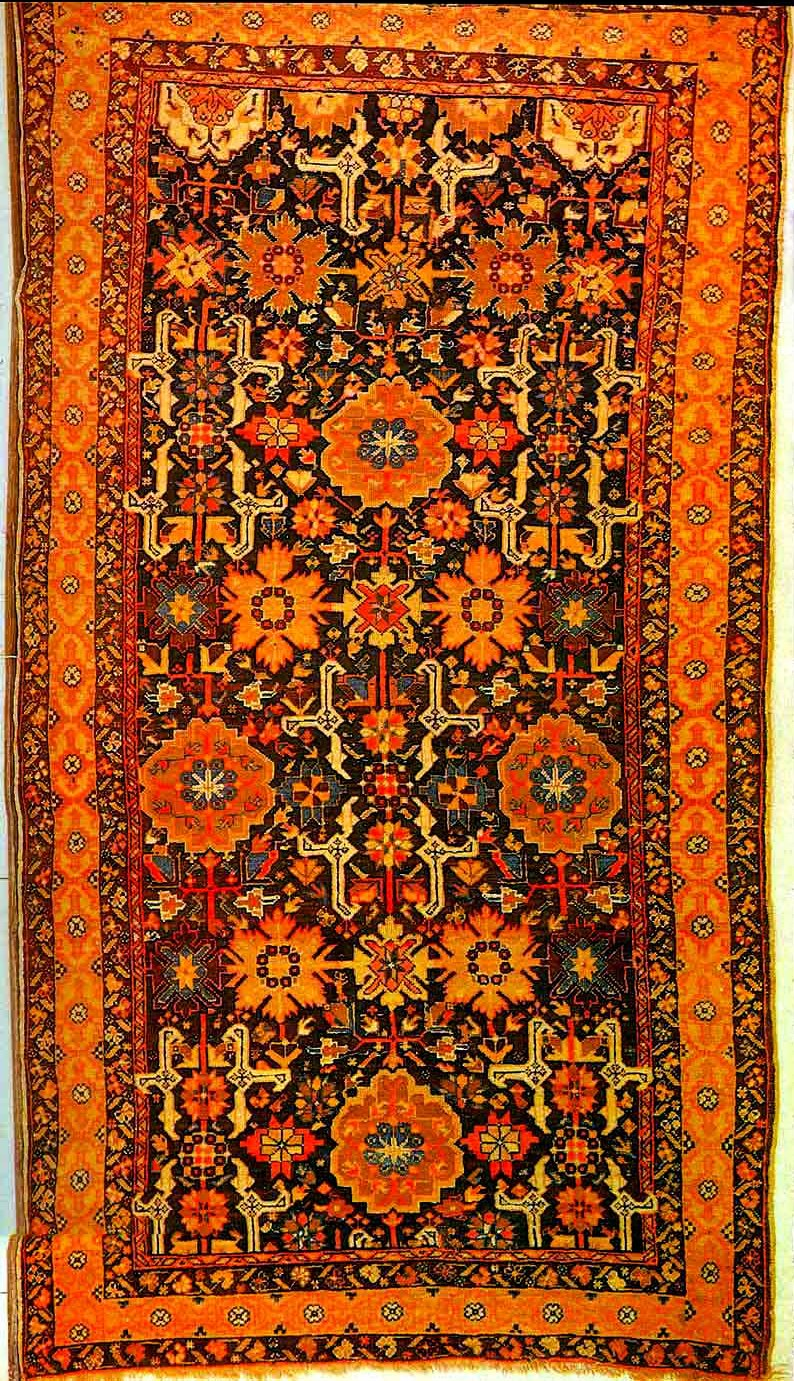
"Khila-Afshan" carpet, Baku school, Azerbaijan Carpet Museum

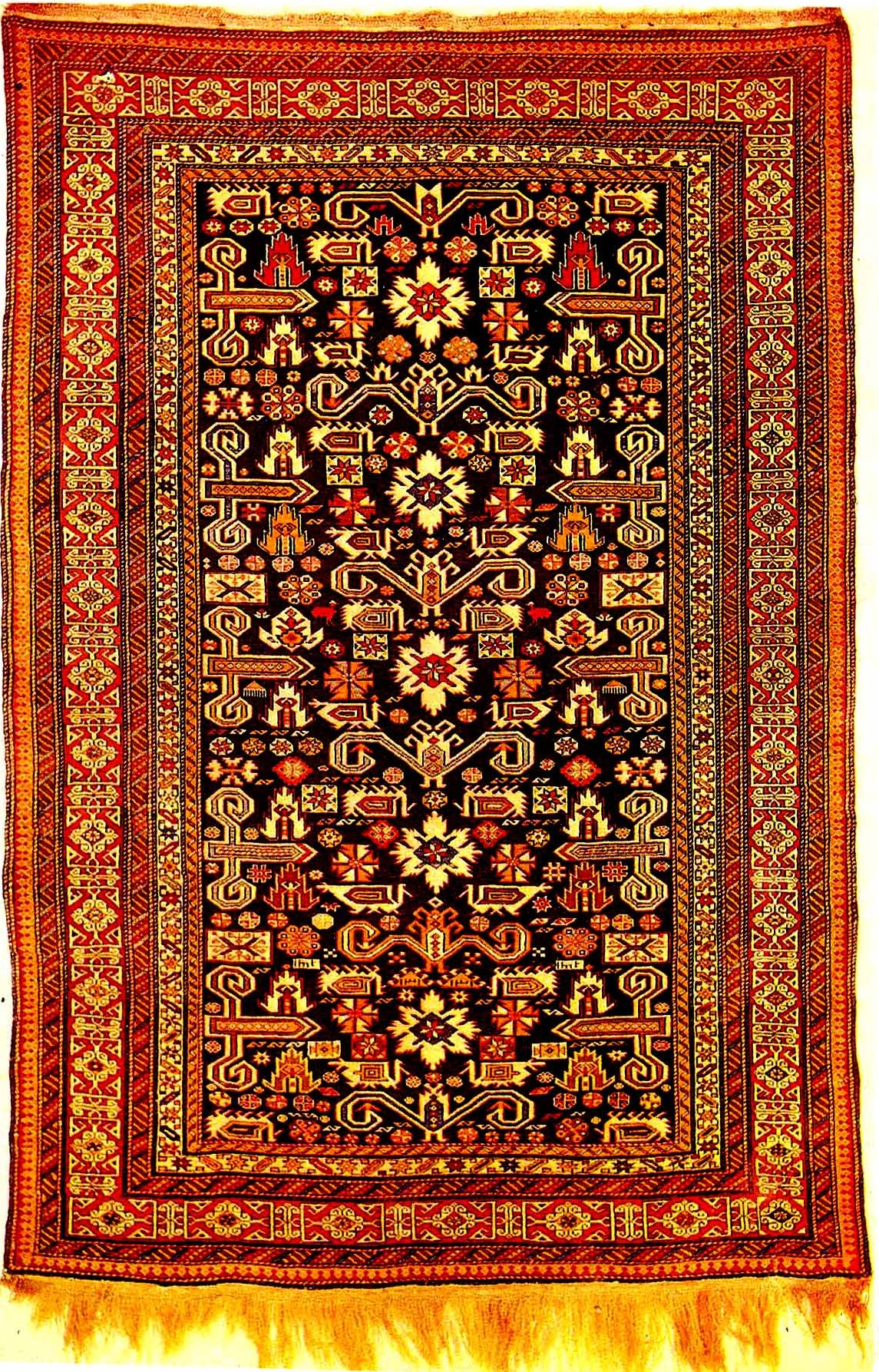
"Prabadil" carpet, Quba school, Azerbaijan Carpet Museum

== 20th century ==
=== Azerbaijan Democratic Republic ===
The Independence Museum of Azerbaijan, where the national symbols of Azerbaijan (the national coat of arms and national flag) were created, was founded in Baku in 1919, after the establishment of Azerbaijan Democratic Republic. Meetings dedicated to the conservation of historical monuments were held in the museum. At that time the magazine Füyuzat was published by Ali bey Huseynzade, the eminent philosopher, journalist and artist of that time and a pioneer of the art of oil painting in Azerbaijan. Huseynzade's most famous works are the reconstruction of the Bibi-Heybat Mosque and the Portrait of the Sheikh ul-Islam.

=== Soviet Azerbaijan ===
New type of arts were developing in Azerbaijan after the establishment of the Soviet regime in Azerbaijan in 1920. The first art school where new genres of visual arts were created, was opened in 1920, in Baku.

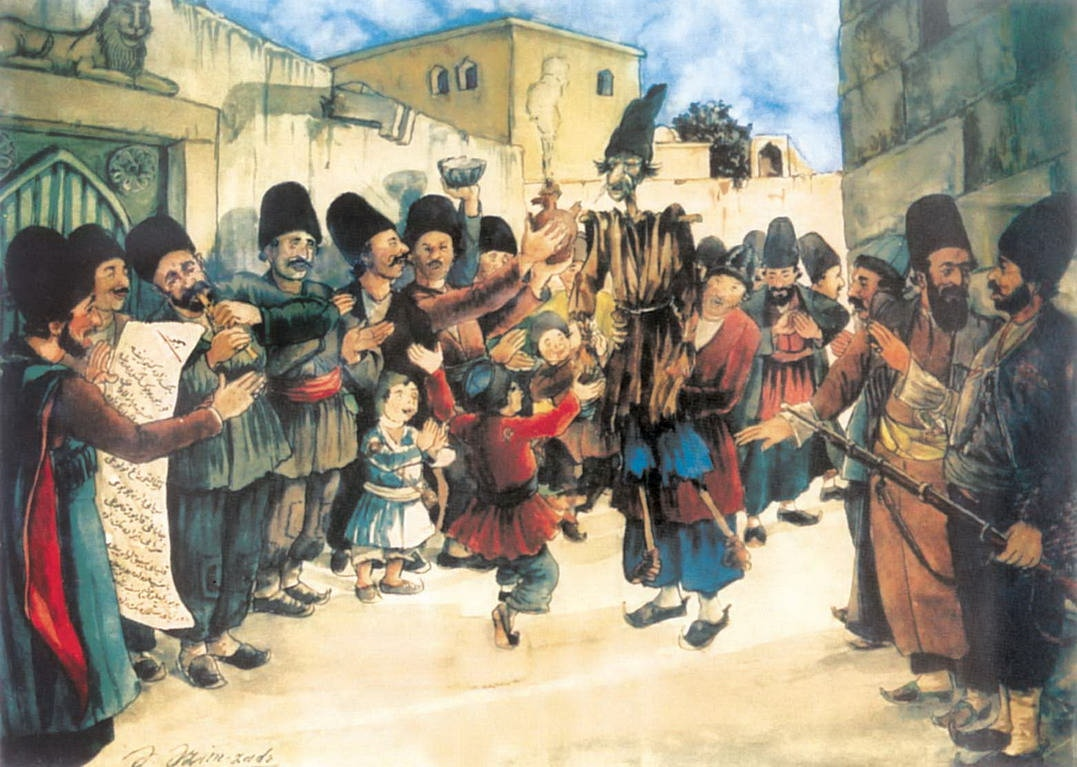
Holiday in village. Azim Azimzade, 1930s.

In the 1930s, artists such as Azim Azimzade, Farhad Khalilov, H. Khaligov, I. Akhundov, A. Hajiyev, M. A. Vlasov, K. Kazimzade, A. Mammadov and others worked in the graphic design sphere. Illustrations for books by Azerbaijani and foreign writers were drawn. Placards relating to the themes of that time were also created.

In 1928, the first art exhibition of the Azerbaijani Union of Young Artists was held. In the 1930s, the exhibition of the Azerbaijani Union of Revolutionary Visual Arts achieved great success.

In 1932, the Committee of Azerbaijani Artists was created. During that period, works such as Grape harvesting by S. Sharifzade, Azim Azimzade's portrait by H. Hagverdiyev, and Portrait of Nizami Ganjavi by Gazanfar Khaligov were famous. Works by Mikayil Abdullayev, B. Mirzazade, B. Aliyeva, Sattar Bahlulzade and K. Khanlarova should also be mentioned. The first Congress of Azerbaijani artists was held in 1940.

Generally, political placards and satiric caricatures were drawn during World War II. Well-known artists as H. Khaligov, I. Akhundov, A. Hajiyev, and S. Sharifzade were creators of this type of art.

The mature stage in Azerbaijani visual arts began in the mid-1950s. Mikayil Abdullayev, Tahir Salahov, Vidadi Narimanbekov, Sattar Bahlulzade, Togrul Narimanbekov, Geysar Kashiyeva and others were famous artists of the Soviet Azerbaijan, in the second half of the 20th century. Tahir Salahov is credited for pioneering a version of "severe realism" more truthful to the grim realities of workers' lives than the bright certainties of Socialist Realism. Gayyur Yunus began painting in the 1970s, but was not recognized until after the Soviet art requirements were relaxed because his style did not conform to the Soviet Realist style.

B. Aliyev, I. Feyzullayev, A. Mammadov, A. Verdiyev and others portrayed subjects of labour and industry in their works. But the works of Elbey Rzaguliyev, T. Sadighzade, Arif Huseynov, K. Najafzade and others are dedicated to the historic past, the traditions and customs of Azerbaijani people, to war and peace. J. Mirjavadova, N. Rahmanova, K. Ahmadova, G. Yunusova, S. Veysova, A. Ibrahimova, I. Mammadova, S. Mirzazade, F. Hashimova, F. Gulamova, A. Samadova and others painted mythological images.

Maral Rahmanzade was the first Azerbaijani woman artist with professional artistic education to achieve great success in the sphere of easel painting and book illustration.

== 21st century ==
=== Independent Azerbaijan ===
Baku Museum of Modern Art

The beginning of the 21st century can be considered as a period of stabilization and revitalization, noted by Teymur Daimi in 2001 for the catalogue of international exhibition published in English and French in Strasbourg in 2002.

The Maiden Tower International Art Festival has been organized since 2010 with the aim to promote globally the Maiden Tower in Old City of Baku, included on UNESCO's World Heritage List in 2000, and considered the symbol of Baku. In 2012, Azerbaijan staged the 2012 Baku Public Art Festival, the country's first modern art festival.

As of the 2000s, fine-art photography has become popular in Azerbaijan, with names such as Rena Effendi hosting exhibitions in London and New York City.

In 2010, the art of Azerbaijani carpet weaving in Azerbaijan was added to the Representative List of the Intangible Cultural Heritage of Humanity. Taking into account its socio-economic importance, Azerbaijani folk applied art, particularly carpet weaving, has been the subject of special attention by the government to preserve, study, promote and develop the carpet weaving traditions of Azerbaijani people. In this regard, the Law "On the protection and development of carpet art of Azerbaijan" was adopted in December 2004. Carpet Weaver Day began to be celebrated on May 5 according to a Presidential Decree, the new building for the Azerbaijan Carpet Museum designed by Austrian architect Franz Janz in the shape of a rolled carpet was constructed between 2007 and 2014. In addition, the state program on the "Protection and development of carpet art in the Republic of Azerbaijan 2018–2022" was approved in February 2018 by President Ilham Aliyev.

== Azerbaijani and Western Art museums of Azerbaijan ==
- National Museum of History of Azerbaijan
- Azerbaijan Carpet Museum
- Heydar liyev Center
- Azim Azimzade's House Museum
- Bahruz Kangarli's House Museum
- Baku Museum of Miniature Books
- Baku Museum of Modern Art
- Gobustan National Park
- National Art Museum of Azerbaijan
- Nakhchivan Open-air Museum
- Sattar Bahlulzade's House Museum

== See also ==
- Togrul Narimanbekov
- Sattar Bahlulzade
- Azim Azimzade
- Iranian culture
- Iranian art
