= Boyukagha =

Boyukagha is a given name. Notable people with the name include:

- Boyukagha Hajiyev (1958–2018), Azerbaijani footballer and manager
- Boyukagha Mirzazade (1921–2007), Azerbaijani artist
