= Narimanbekov =

Narimanbekov is a surname. Notable people with the surname include:

- Togrul Narimanbekov (1930–2013), Azerbaijani artist
- Vidadi Narimanbekov (1926–2001), Azerbaijani artist
