= Huseyn Hagverdiyev =

Azerbaijani painter, photographer and sculptor

Huseyn Hagverdiyev Hüseyn Haqverdiyev
- Born: March 3, 1956 (age 69); Ujar, Azerbaijan SSR, USSR
- Occupation: sculptor
- Relatives: Ujal Hagverdiyev
- Awards: Honored Artist of Azerbaijan

Huseyn Hasan oghlu Hagverdiyev (Azerbaijani: Hüseyn Həsən oğlu Haqverdiyev, born March 3, 1956) is an Azerbaijani painter, photographer and sculptor, People's Artist of Azerbaijan (2021).

== Biography ==
Huseyn Hagverdiyev was born in 1956 in Ujar. In 1971–1975, he studied at the Azim Azimzade Art College. In the same year, he entered the Leningrad Vera Mukhina Higher School of Art and Design, graduated from the sculpture faculty in 1980.

He is the author of the statue "Virgin Mary" in the Church of the Holy Virgin Mary, the main cathedral church of the Apostolic Prefecture of Azerbaijan and the work "Legend of the Caspian Sea" at the entrance of the Sangachal Terminal. Exhibitions and symposia have been held in countries such as India, USA, Germany, Georgia, UAE. In 2014, his solo exhibition took place in Uzbekistan.

== Awards ==
- Honored Artist of Azerbaijan — May 30, 2002
- People's Artist of Azerbaijan — October 16, 2021
