= Independence Museum of Azerbaijan =

Museum in Baku, Azerbaijan

Coordinates: 40.368265°N 49.833091°E

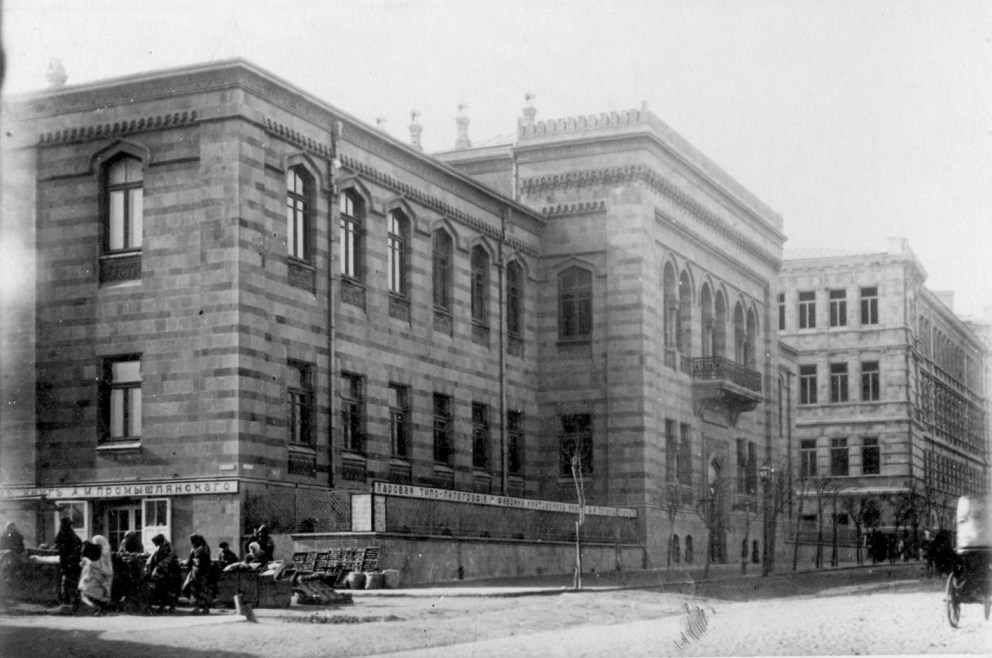
- Former building of the museum on Istiglaliyyat Street
- Established: 7 December 1919
- Location: 49 Neftchilar Avenue, Baku, Azerbaijan
- Collection size: 20,000 items
- Public transit access: M 1 Sahil metro station

The Independence Museum of Azerbaijan or "Istiqlal" Museum (Azerbaijani: İstiqlal Muzeyi) – is a museum established on 7 December 1919 in Baku – the capital of the Azerbaijan Democratic Republic. H. Mirzajamalov and I. M. Aghaoglu had a great role in the creation of the museum. Archeological finds, exemplars of rare books, objects of numismatics, jewelry, etc. were collected in the museum.

The museum was located in the building of the ADR's Parliament (at present – the building of the Institute of Manuscripts of Azerbaijan National Academy of Sciences). It is noted that, namely at that time, an attempt at making a legal document about organizing and storing museum items was undertaken. The museum existed only a year and could not realize all intended plans. It was liquidated in 1920, when Soviet power was established in Baku. Materials collected in the museum became basis for the "Muzexcurs" foundations and the Azerbaijan State Museum.

The second Independence Museum was established on 9 January 1991 with only 7,000 exhibits. Due to subsequent attempts and investigations of the museum's collections, the number of exhibits reached 20,000. The main goal of the museum is to highlight the national independence movement of Azerbaijan from ancient times to the present. The exposition of the museum is exhibited in six halls:

The first hall is dedicated to the history of Azerbaijan from the ancient times to the 19th century, the second hall to the history of Azerbaijan between the second half of the 19th and 20th centuries, the third hall to the national independence movement in the Southern Azerbaijan in the first half of the 20th century, the fourth hall to the history of Azerbaijan during repression and the Great Patriotic War, the fifth hall to national independence movement of Azerbaijan at the end of the 20th century and the first Karabakh War, and the sixth hall to the history of Independent Republic of Azerbaijan and activity of the national leader Heydar Aliyev.

There are masterpieces of art and architecture, maps, pictures, books, currencies and other exhibits in the Independence Museum of Azerbaijan. Many expositions and activities dedicated to historical events are held in the exposition of the museum.

The museum opens its doors during such events as the International Day for Monuments and Sites (18 April), International Museum Day (18 May) and World Tourism Day (27 September).

Free access to the museum is available for members of ICOM (International Council of Museums), museum workers, military personnel, veterans of World War II, victims of the Karabakh war and Black January.

The museum also has a children's circle called "We are the heirs of the independence", where children are offered a variety of tasks and told about the history of the state in entertaining form.
