= Ujal Hagverdiyev =

Azerbaijani painter

Peter Ujal Hagverdiyev
- Pyotr Ucal Haqverdiyev
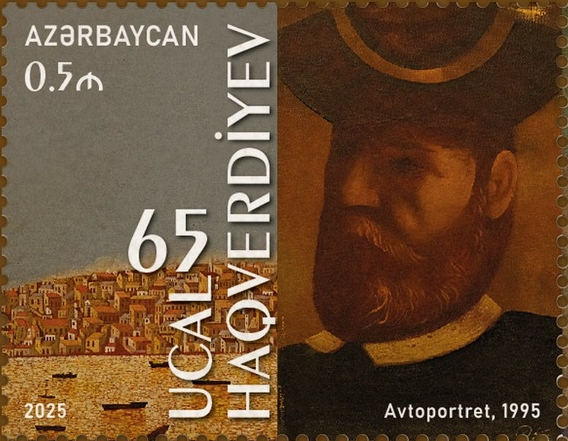
- Self-portrait (1995) on a 2025 stamp of Azerbaijan
- Born: Ucal Həsən oğlu Haqverdiyev; 9 June 1960; Baku, Azerbaijan SSR, USSR
- Died: 18 December 2004 (aged 44); Baku, Azerbaijan
- Spouse: Yelena Hagverdiyeva
- Awards: Humay Award

Peter Ujal Hagverdiyev (Azerbaijani: Pyotr Ucal Haqverdiyev; 9 June 1960 – 18 December 2004) was an Azerbaijani painter and member of the Union of Artists of Azerbaijan.

== Biography ==
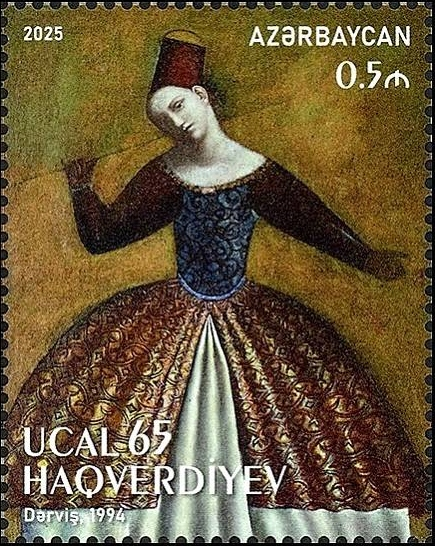
Dervish (1994) by Hagverdiyev on a 2025 stamp of Azerbaijan

Ujal Hagverdiyev was born on 9 June 1960 in Baku. He studied at the Azim Azimzade School of Arts. In 1979, he was admitted to the State Art Institute of the Estonian SSR, but then continued his education at Azerbaijan State Pedagogical University – at the time named after Vladimir Lenin, and now named after Nasir Tusi.

In 1985, Hagverdiyev joined the Young Artists Union under the Union of Artists of Azerbaijan. Since 1997, he has been a full member of the Union of Artists of Azerbaijan.

In 1987, Hagverdiyev began participating in exhibitions in Azerbaijan and across the Soviet Union. In the same year, he converted to Orthodox Christianity, was baptized and took the name "Peter" (Pyotr). Between 1988 and 1991, he was a scholarship holder at the USSR Academy of Arts and participated in its official exhibitions.

In 1990, Hagverdiyev participated in an exhibition of young Azerbaijani artists in France. In 1995, he exhibited in a joint exhibition of Azerbaijani and Turkish artists in Istanbul. His solo exhibitions were held in Tunisia (Tunis, 1991), in Germany (Cologne, 1992) and in Austria (Vienna, 1993). He also participated in art symposiums in Austria, Germany and Baku, Azerbaijan. In 1998–1999, he joined the "Land ART" project with a number of artists, and in 2000, he was awarded the Humay Award as a part of the "Labyrinth" group. From 2000 to 2004, he volunteered on the artistic design of the Michael Archangel Church in Baku. His works have been exhibited in the United States, Germany, Austria, France, Norway and Turkey.

Peter Ujal Hagverdiyev died on 18 December 2004 in Baku.

== Family ==
- Son of Hasan Hagverdiyev
- Brother of Ali Hagverdiyev, Huseyn Hagverdiyev and Zemfira Gafarova
- Husband of Yelena Hagverdiyeva
