= Divankhana (Shirvanshah's Palace) =

Architectural feature in Baku, Azerbaijan

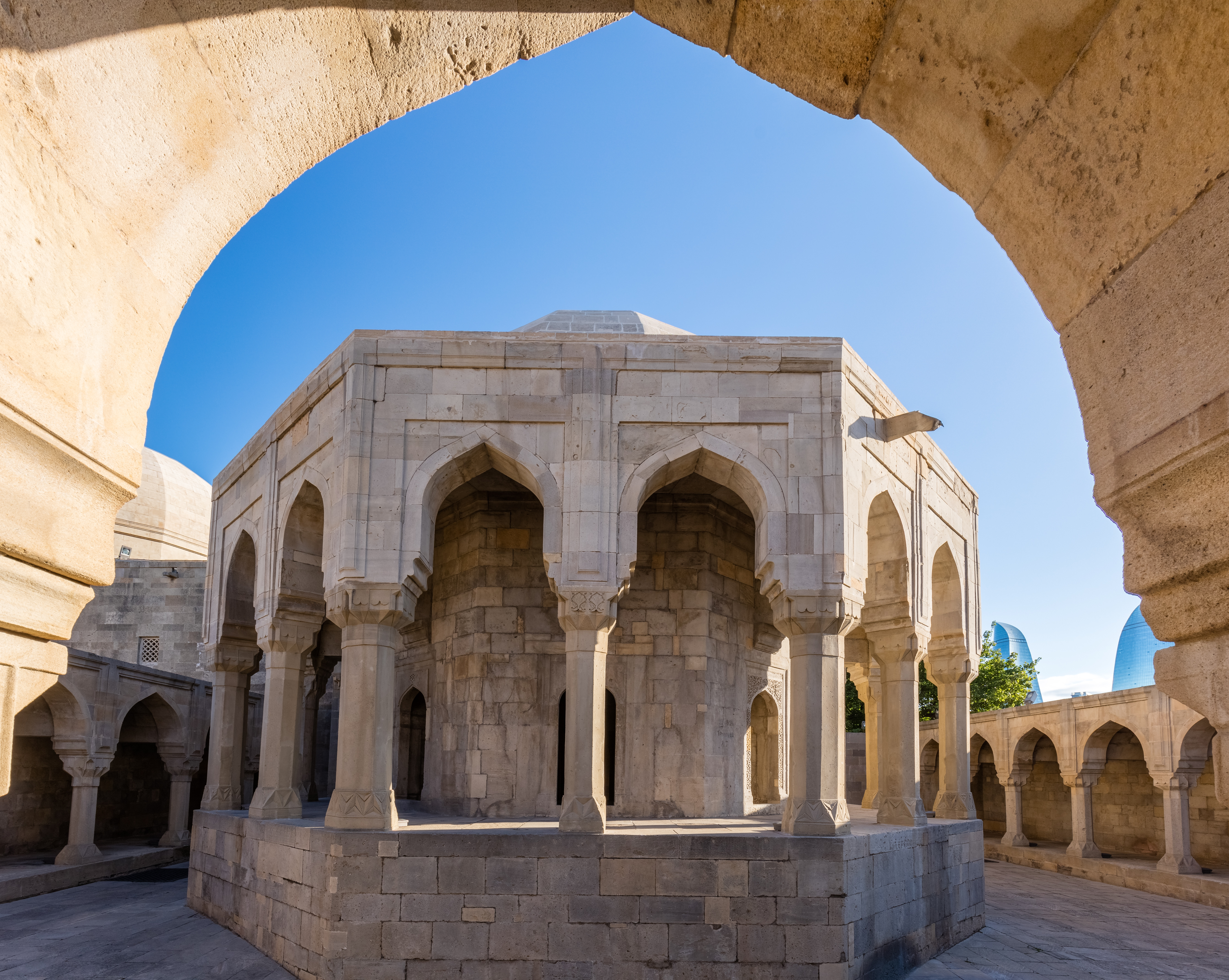

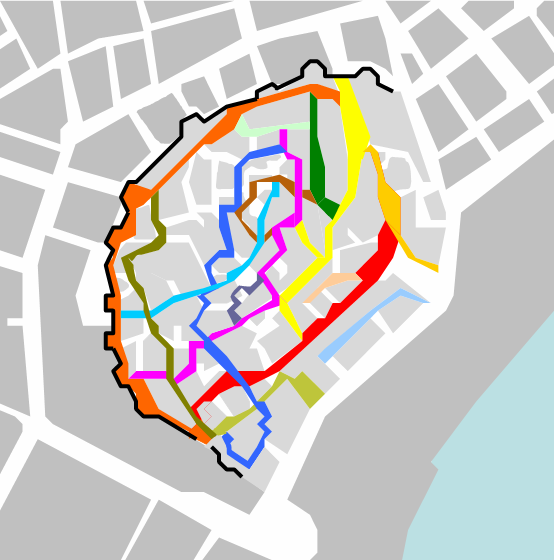
- Location in the Baku Old City
- 40°21′58″N 49°49′59″E
- Location: Old City, Baku, Azerbaijan

History
- Founder: I Farrukh Yassar
- Built: 1450 CE

UNESCO World Heritage Site
- Official name: Divankhana
- Type: Cultural
- Criteria: iv
- Designated: 2000 (24th session)
- Part of: Walled City of Baku with the Shirvanshah's Palace and Maiden Tower
- Reference no.: 958
- Region: Europe/Asia
- Endangered: 2003–2009

The Divankhana is a rotunda pavilion built on a tall stylobate in the north-west of the Shirvanshahs Palace, located in the historic Old City of Baku, in Azerbaijan. In the fifteenth century, Shirvanshah was built by order of Farrukh Yasar. Several stories describe the Divan's operation. It is believed that it served as a court, a reception hall, a government council or a tomb.

The stylistic features and the incomplete embroidery work allow the Divankhana to end at the end of the fifteenth century when the Safavid armies took Baku. The origin of the original architectural structure of the building is associated with pre-Islamic funeral ceremonies.

The Divankhana forms part of the UNESCO World Heritage-listed Palace of the Shirvanshahs.

== History ==
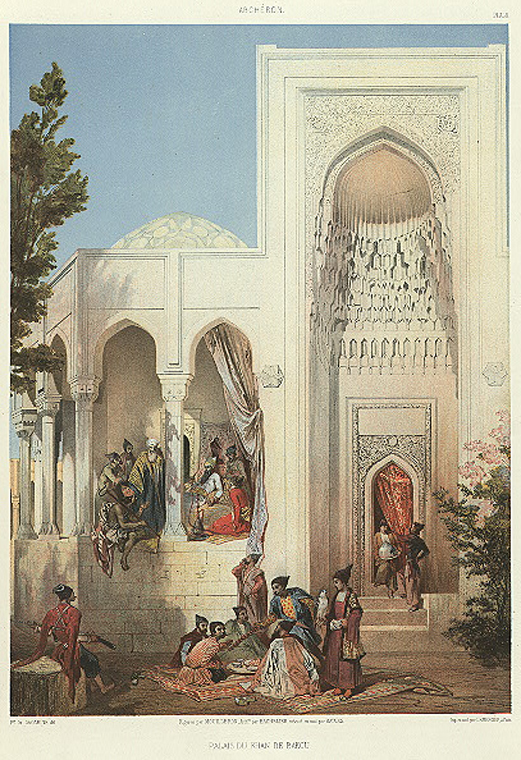
Painting of Divankhana by Grigory Gagarin

In Leonard Bretaniski and Sara Ashurbeyli's studies, the Divankhana was built in the fifteenth century by the order of Shirvanshah Farrukh Yasar.

One of the door openings at the café's pavilion was probably broken and left in unreadable Arabic. V. Sysoyev claims that he read the name of Khalilullah and Hijri 832 (1428–1429 CE), but Ashurbeyli says that this is impossible to check. The canteen may be a memorial monument. Ashurbeyli noted that this building may have been a tomb and according to sources, the remains of the golden calf were buried there by I Halilullah.

According to another assumption, the building was built by Yasar as a tomb, but he was not buried here because he was buried by the gendarmes after his defeat at Caban in 1500.

According to other information, the Divanjan was the place where formal receptions and state council sessions were held. These sessions were held directly in the octagonal hall of the rattan carpets decorated with the participation of the king and his officials. The location of this place is the place where consultation is carried out. The hall reflects the crown image, which is a symbol of statehood, with a richly carved ornament on the west facade.

Its current name is the basis of the most widely held theory, that it was a reception room. The stylistic features and the incomplete embroidery work date the Divanjan to the end of the fifteenth century when the Safavid armies took Baku. The clerical plan, the content of the inscription on the ground floor and entrance to the hall (Quran, verses 10, 26 and 27) show that it is a memorial place.

The original architectural structure is associated with the burial customs of Islam. Historian Sara Ashurbeyli believes that before the Muslim era the site was a sacred place. She supposed that the pits were used to store the blood of dead animals.

== Architectural style ==
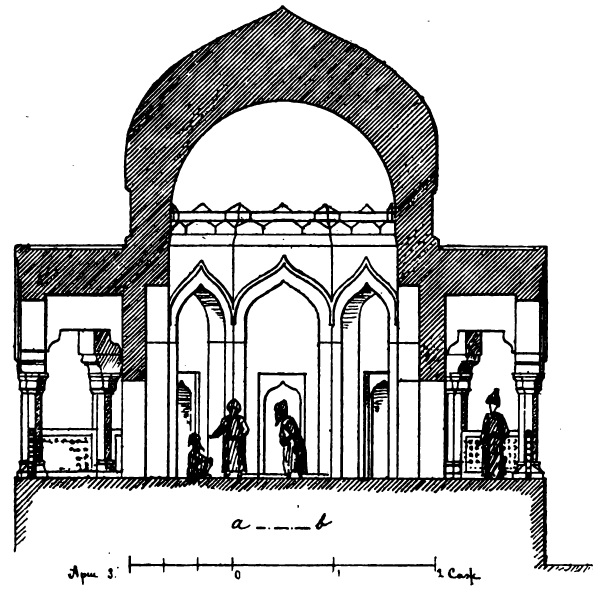
Cross-section of Divankhana

Divankhana is a twelve-headed dome with an octagonal rotor. It combines an eight-pointed open-air eagle. The pillars of the porch are lined with nine columns, which are individually shaped and split. The tracks on the columns indicate that they are decorated with fine tunics. The entrances to the Divankhana are from the yard and from the street.

The western entrance is covered by a refined surface. The center of the hall offers a quadrilateral shape with a basement staircase.

The eight-story hall is aimed at an open gallery with five facets of shaped backgrounds on the shaded columns of a specific order. The surface of the arcades, along with the shadows, is marked with smooth profiles that form the special plastic wall. The dome with a double contour overflowing with a contour staircase comes out of the hall. The daymare is increasing, leaving behind the smooth roof of the shaded gallery.

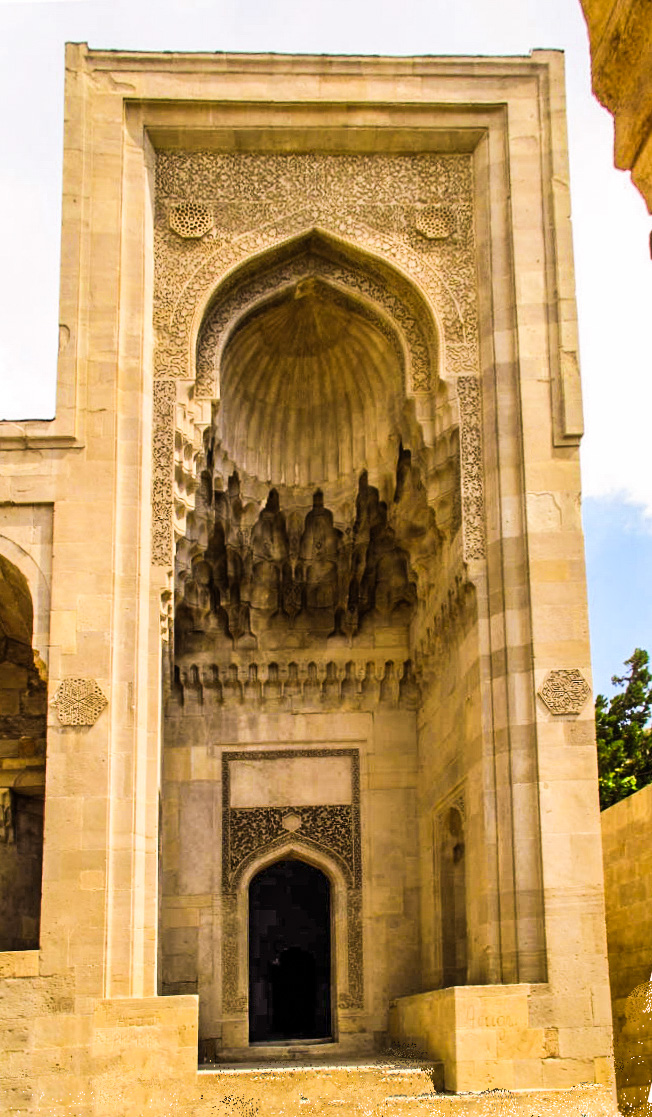
Facade of portal in Divankhana

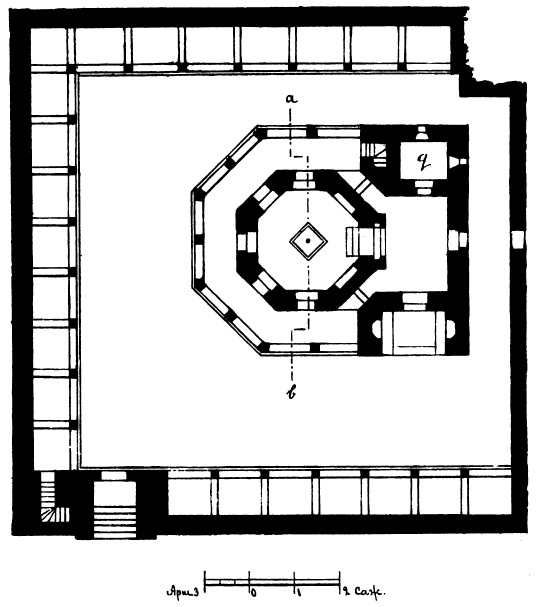
Plan of Divankhana

The columns are combined in the rear of the rotunda, respectively, by the volume of the hall through horizontal blocks of flat stone. The tectonics of architectural masses are marked by the constructive forms, and the large scale of the building has been adapted to all architectural elements and details. The peculiarity of the order is individually characterized by the rarity in the general composition of the rotunda.

The column's individuality has been specifically emphasized in the architectural form of a single vertical block. The inner interior of the rotunda is constructed in the form of a dome-shaped, transverse eight-way transitional arc with the shape of stalactites. All interiors that are paved with scarf stones reveal the size of the architectural system and sensitivity of the material.

In the center, a corridor forms a straight line. Another is the entrance to the two southern slopes. The eastern part of the corridor includes a small service room. Five wells occupy in the courtyard at various depths (from 3 to 15 m).

The perimeter around the square-shaped yard of the ceiling, open array galleries are located on the colloquium, which is similar to the rotunda. The courtyard's gallery is lower than the Divan's sign and is a unique backdrop of the eight-point Roton's rigid stylobate.

== Decorations ==
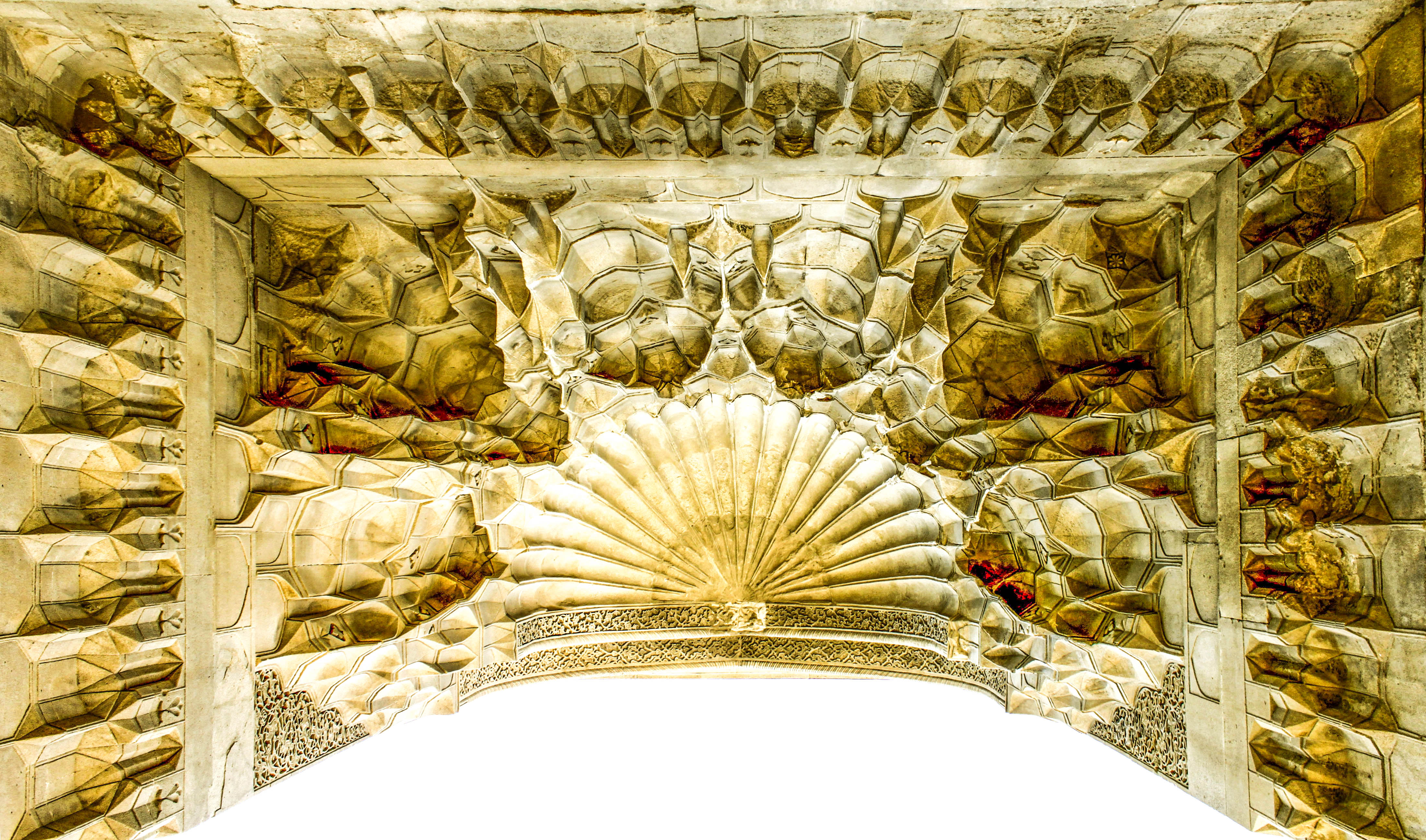
The portal of Divankhana

The western arcade is dominated by a dynamic portal. Its sleeve includes a sophisticated semi-arched stalactite complex system. A timpani on the entrance door is covered with ornaments on the surface of the stone. The severity of the portrait of the portal is more noticeable than the elegance of the ornament. Ş. Fatullayev-Fikarov noted that "this is not the architectural philosophy of the Eastern art, which is derived from the depth of development processes of classical speeds, but not the portals composition of the Absheron architecture, which is merely at the level of excellence."
