= Arif Huseynov =

Soviet Azerbaijan painter (born 1943)

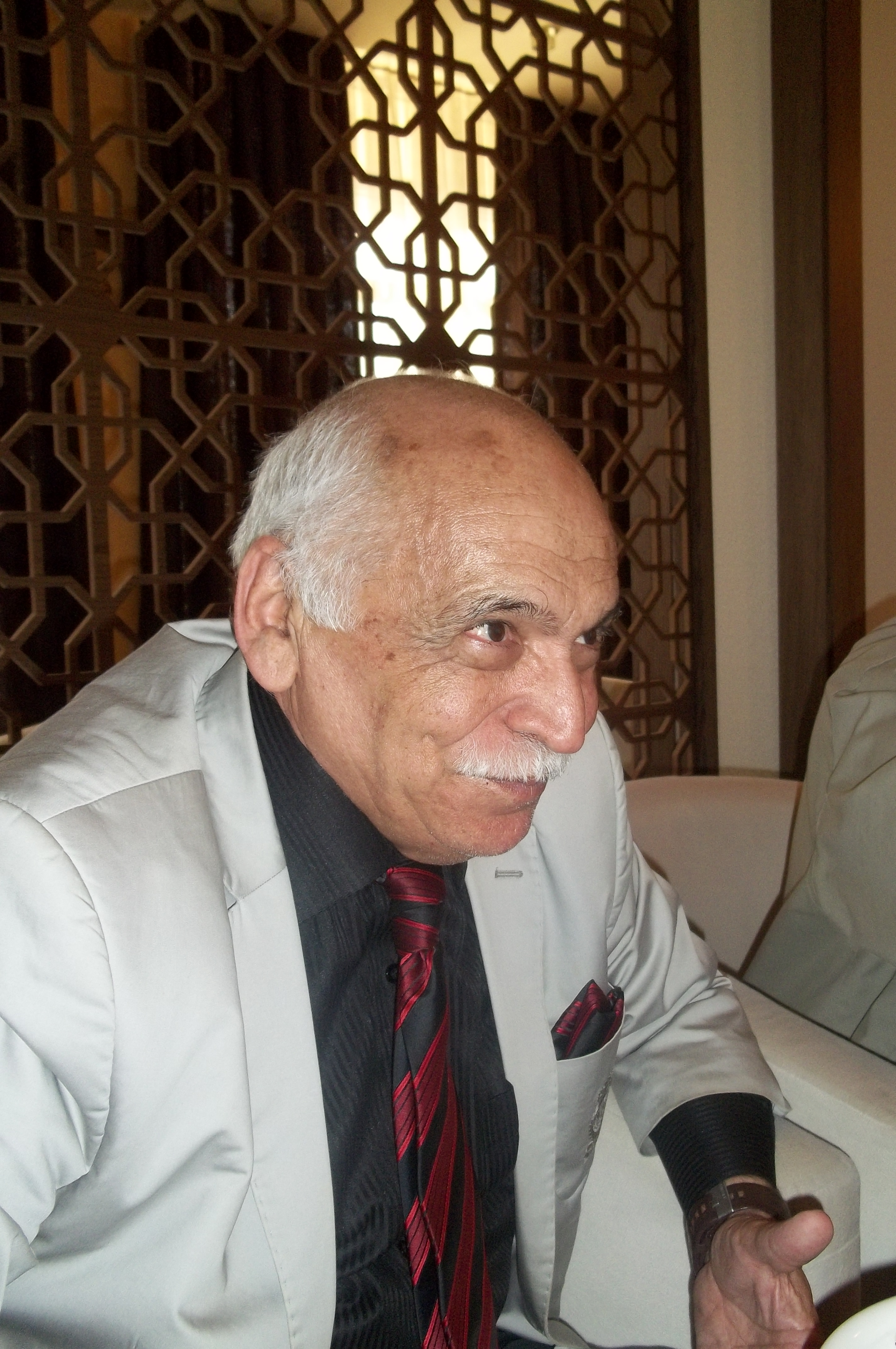
- Born: October 30, 1943 (age 82); Baku, Azerbaijan SSR, USSR
- Education: Baku Art School named after Azim Azimzade; ASUCA

Arif Huseynov (born 1943) is an Azerbaijani painter. He was awarded the titles of People's Artist of Azerbaijan (2006), and Honored Artist of the Azerbaijan (1992).

== About ==
Arif Huseynov was born in 1943 in Gala Village of Baku, Azerbaijan SSR, Soviet Union (now Azerbaijan). In 1960 to 1962, he graduated from the secondary school of art at Azim Azimzade Art School and in 1965 to 1972, he studied at the Azerbaijan State University of Culture and Arts. Huseynov's works are currently being kept at the Azerbaijan National Museum of Art, Moscow State Museum of Oriental Art, Azerbaijan State Gallery, as well as in personal collections.

== Creativity ==
Since 1975 he was a member of the Union of Artists. For more than 40 years, he has been consistently engaged in creativity. As of this period, he was mainly engaged in machine and book graphics.

The portrait works of Huseynov are mostly historical. These portraits cross the narrow realism border. War and military scenes around the portraits have a great impact on the audience. Portraits of historical personalities and literary characters are rich in Huseynov's work. Portraits of poets - Nizami, Fuzuli and Sabir, Tolstoy and Andersen or Azerbaijani generals of the writers have been accurately described. Physical characteristics have been conveyed, and the illustrations has also been able to show their inner world.

In illustrations for many books by local and foreign authors, Huseynov gives a modern interpretation of the traditional principles of Azerbaijan. Illustrations show not only the artist's read, but his perspective. These drawings make the artist one of the legitimate authors of the book. These illustrations make space for readers. Some of the best examples of Huseynov's illustration are: "Fitna" - Nizami Ganjavi, "Words" - Samad Vurgun, "Knight in tiger skin" - Shota Rustavelli and "Doctor Aybolit" by Korney Chukovskiy.

== Education ==
- 1960–1962, Art college named after A. Azimzadeh
- 1965–1972, Azerbaijan State University of Culture and Arts

== Solo exhibitions ==
- 2012, Sabir, "Hophopnama", The Museum Centre, Baku, Azerbaijan
- 2012, Azerbaijani Fairy-tale, Baku, Azerbaijan
- 2009, Galere Berlin-Baku, Berlin, Germany
- 2006, "Daikokuya" gallery, Tokyo, Japan
- 1984, "100 illustrations", Baku, Azerbaijan and Moscow, Russia

== Awards and honors ==
- 2008, Pension of the President of Azerbaijan Republic
- 2006, People's Artist of Azerbaijan
- 1995, Humay Award for the achievements in fine art
- 1992, Honored Artist of the Azerbaijan

== See also ==
- List of Azerbaijani artists
- List of Azerbaijani painters
