= Boyukagha Mirzazade =

Azerbaijani artist (1921–2007)

- Born: Boyukagha Meshadi oglu Mirzazade; February 21, 1921; Baku, Azerbaijan SSR
- Died: November 3, 2007 (aged 86); Baku, Azerbaijan

Boyukagha Meshadi oglu Mirzazade (Azerbaijani: Böyükağa Məşədi oğlu Mirzəzadə, February 21, 1921 – November 3, 2007) was an Azerbaijani artist, named People's Artist of the Azerbaijan SSR in 1967.

== Biography ==
In 1939, Boyukagha Mirzazade graduated from Baku Technical School of the Arts, where Azim Azimzade was one of his teachers. In 1940, Mirzazade entered the Moscow Institute of Fine Arts, but could not complete his education there because of the beginning of the Great Patriotic War. Later, Mirzazade studied at Azerbaijan State University of Culture and Arts. After graduating, he worked at a technical school of arts as a teacher and an artist. Mirzazade was the head of a department at Azerbaijan State University of Culture and Arts, and a professor of Azerbaijan State Academy of Fine Arts.

Works of the artist are kept and exhibited in Azerbaijan State Museum of Art, Nizami Ganjavi National Museum of Azerbaijani Literature and Baku Museum of Modern Art. Mirzazade acquired a reputation as an excellent theatrical artist, and he is the author of stage designs for 20 shows. Mirzazade was a laureate of the State Prize of Azerbaijan Republic. The works of the artist were repeatedly exhibited in the USSR and in other countries.
