= Mikayil Abdullayev =

Azerbaijani painter (1921–2002)

Mikayıl Abdullayev
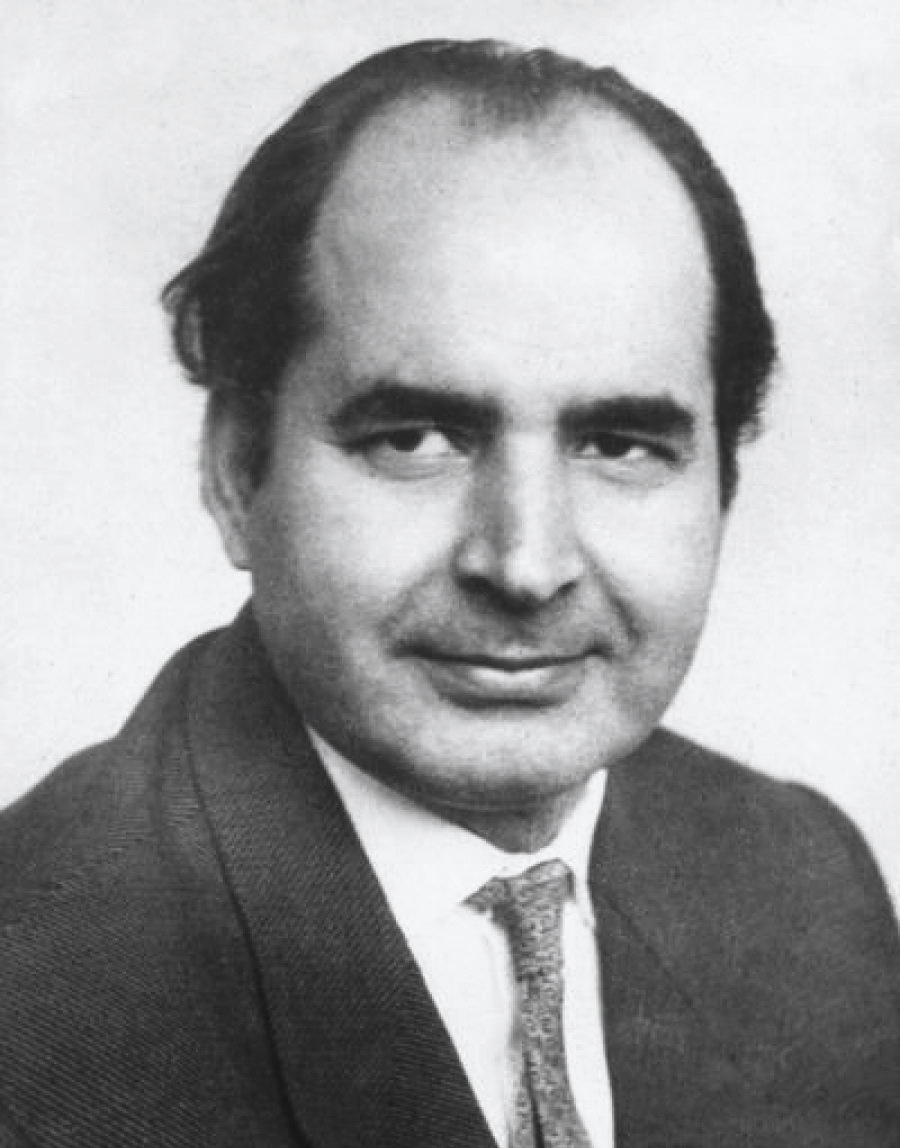
- Mikayil Abdullaev in the mid-1960s
- Born: Mikayil Abdullayev; 19 December 1921; Baku, Azerbaijan SSR, Soviet Union
- Died: 21 August 2002 (aged 80); Baku, Azerbaijan
- Known for: Impressionism

Mikayil Huseyn oglu Abdullayev (19 December 1921, Baku – 21 August 2002, Baku) was a Soviet and Azerbaijani painter. He was awarded the honorary title of People's Painter of the USSR (1963) and People's Painter of the Azerbaijan SSR (1963). Abdullayev created a series of paintings entitled Through India.

== Biography ==
Mikayil Huseyn oglu Abdullayev was born 19 December 1921 in Baku, Azerbaijan SSR, Soviet Union. He graduated from the A. Azimzadeh Azerbaijan Painting School in 1939 and later studied at the Surikov Moscow Art Institute (now Moscow School of Painting, Sculpture and Architecture), completing his studies in 1949.

During his trips to India, Afghanistan, Hungary, Poland, Italy and other countries between 1956 and 1971, Abdullayev painted works such as Bengali Girls, Rajasthani Women, An Old Afghan, as well as portraits of Zsigmond Kisfaludi Stróbl, Renato Guttuso and Giacomo Manzù, among others. His portraits of Azerbaijani cultural figures include Uzeyir Hajibeyov, Samad Vurgun, Mirza Fatali Akhundov and Farhad Badalbeyli.

Abdullayev's paintings have been exhibited in cities such as Paris, London, Berlin, Montreal, Prague, Budapest, Belgrade, Sofia, Warsaw, Delhi, Cairo and Brussels. He was also the designer of an artistic panel in the Nizami Station of the Baku Metro.

== Notable works ==
- 1947 – An Evening
- 1948 – Mingachevir Lights
- 1951 – Builders of Happiness
- 1956 – Sevinj
- 1963-65 – On the Fields of Azerbaijan triptych
- 1964 – On the Absheron
- 1982 – Khachmaz Girls

== Awards ==
- Honored Worker of Arts of the Azerbaijani SSR (1955)
- People's Painter of the Azerbaijani SSR (1960)
- People's Painter of the USSR (1963)
- State Prize of the Azerbaijani SSR (1974)
- Order of Lenin (1959)
- Order of the October Revolution (1972)
- Order of Friendship of Peoples (1981)
- Istiglal Order (1997)
