= Geysar Kashiyeva =

Azerbaijani painter (1893–1972)

Geysar Seyfulla qizi Kashiyeva
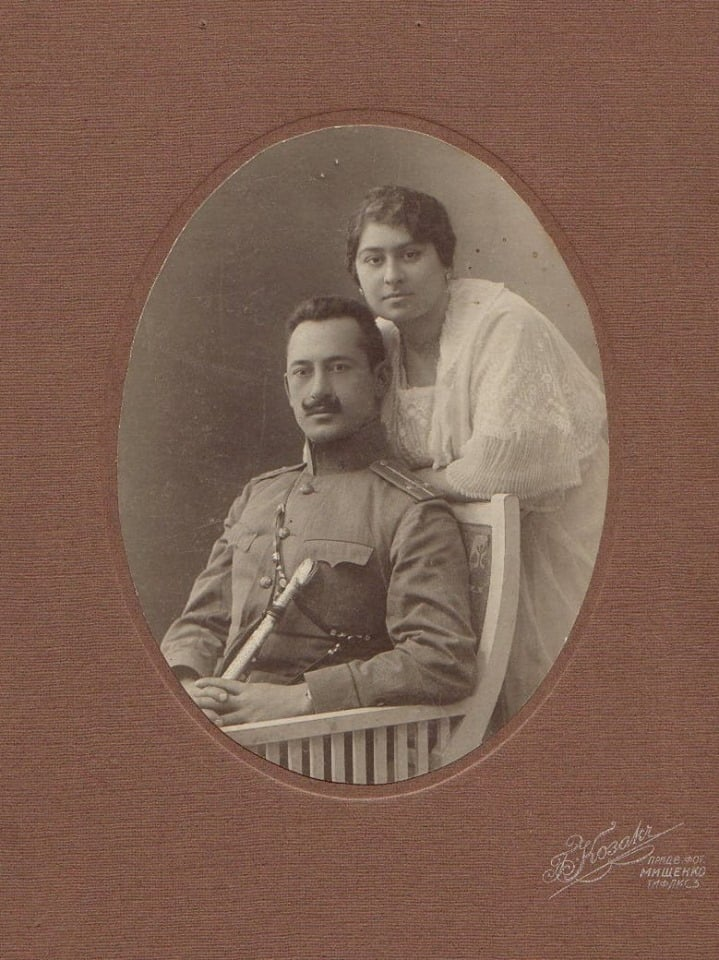
- Geysar Kashiyeva and her husband Shirin-bek Kasamanski
- Born: Qeysər Kaşıyeva; 7 June 1893; Tbilisi
- Died: 17 April 1972 (aged 78); Baku
- Known for: Painter

Geysar Seyfulla qizi Kashiyeva (Azerbaijani: Qeysər Kaşıyeva; 7 June 1893, Tiflis – 17 April 1972, Baku) was an Azerbaijani painter. She is considered the first professional female painter in Azerbaijani history.

== Life ==
Geysar Kashiyeva was born on June 7, 1893, in Tbilisi. At the age of seven, she attended a girls' boarding school in Tiflis, where she learned the Russian language, and later continued her education at the Girls' Gymnasium. It was during her years at the Gymnasium that her interest in painting emerged, alongside her fascination with literary composition and literary seed work. In 1907-1908, she studied at the painting school near the society promoting art in Tbilisi. Later, the renowned Russian painter Richard Zommer, impressed by Geysar's talent, encouraged her to continue her education in Moscow, but the harsh conditions of the time did not allow for this, so Geysar had to be content with the environment in Tbilisi. She participated in all events organized by the Women's Charity Society in Tbilisi. It was at one of these events that Geysar Kaşıyeva met Shirin beg Kasamanski. Shirin beg was the son of Chingiz bey from the Qazakh nobility. He had received education at a military gymnasium in Tbilisi and had served in a light cavalry regiment for a while. The couple then formed a family, and from this marriage, a daughter was born to them. In 1916, she married Colonel Shirin beg Kasamanski, who was undergoing medical treatment in Tiflis after having been wounded in one of the battles during World War I. He died shortly after the war, in 1919. Their only daughter Layya later became a chemist and died in 1994. After the establishment of the Azerbaijan Democratic Republic, Geysar moved from Tbilisi to Baku in 1918. During the Soviet era, she taught painting in Baku and contributed illustrations to the "Eastern Step" journal. In 1930, Geysar married for the second time, to Zulfugar Seyidbeyli, but this marriage also did not last long. In the 1930s she married Zulfugar Seyidbeyli, an active member of the Communist Party of Azerbaijan. In 1938 Seyidbeyli was arrested for political reasons and deported along with Kashiyeva from European Russia. Shortly after, they were both exiled.

Geysar returned to Azerbaijan in 1950 and died on April 17, 1972, in Baku. Her works are preserved in the Museum of Fine Arts in Baku.

== Contributions ==
In the early stages of her artistic career, she designed posters and charters for cultural events organized by women's charitable societies in Tbilisi. Between 1907 and 1915, she created numerous works using watercolor, black ink, pencil, and charcoal, including portraits and landscapes such as "Portrait of I. Goncharov" (1909), "Azerbaijani Intellectual" (1912), "Lakeside" (1914), and "The Old Herbalist" (1915). During the Soviet period, she worked at the Ali Bayramov Club for Women and illustrated for the magazine Azerbaijani Woman (journal). Her albums are preserved in the Azerbaijan National Museum of Art.

She was active in the fields of painting and graphic arts. She was the first Azerbaijani woman to receive a professional art education. Q. Kashieva acquired her artistic skills in Tbilisi, where she was born, at the art studio under the Caucasian Society for the Promotion of the Arts (1907–1908). She studied under renowned artists of the time, including R. Sommer and Oscar Schmerling. Her body of work includes pieces in various genres. Among her works in charcoal, ink, watercolor, and oil are "Intellectual Woman", "Old Guard", "Georgian Girl", "The Hunter", "Firefighter", "Portrait of Gogol", "Azerbaijani Intellectual", "The Old Herbalist", "Portrait of I. Goncharov", and "Lakeside", which reflect the traditions of realism and showcase her distinctive artistic technique. She also illustrated for the Azerbaijani Woman journal, which was published in Baku between 1923 and 1938.

In the 1930s, following the execution of her husband as an "enemy of the people," she herself was arrested and exiled. This tragic turn led to the loss of much of her rich artistic heritage. The few surviving works of Qeysar Khanum are preserved today at the Azerbaijan National Museum of Art.
