= Farhad Khalilov =

Farhad Khalilov Fərhad Xəlilov
- Born: 26 October 1946 (age 80); Baku, Azerbaijan SSR, USSR
- Education: Azerbaijan State Art School named after Azim Azimzade; Stroganov Moscow State Academy of Arts and Industry; Moscow Polygraphic Institute
- Known for: artist
- Style: abstract art
- Father: Gurban Khalilov
- Awards

Farhad Gurban oglu Khalilov (Azerbaijani: Fərhad Qurban oğlu Xəlilov, born 26 October 1946 in Baku) is a People's Artist of Azerbaijan and chairman of the Union of Artists of Azerbaijan.

== Biography ==
Farhad Khalilov was born on 26 October 1946 in Baku. In 1961–1966 he studied at Azerbaijan State Art School named after Azim Azimzade. He continued his education at Stroganov Art School in 1966–1968 and at Moscow Polygraphic Institute in 1969–1975.

F. Khalilov has been a member of Artists' Union of the USSR since 1989, and in 1987 he was elected chairman of the Union of Artists of Azerbaijan. He has been an honorary member of the Russian Academy of Arts since 2008.

Absheron motifs play an important role in the artist's work. Beaches and views of Absheron, as well as settlements of the Absheron Peninsula – Nardaran, Buzovna, Zagulba, Mashtaga, Mardakan and others – are examples of this. His works have been repeatedly exhibited in the countries of the former USSR, within Europe, as well as in various galleries and exhibitions.

== Awards ==
- Silver medal of the Russian Academy of Arts – 1987
- Honored Artist of the Azerbaijan SSR – 7 May 1988
- Ordre des Arts et des Lettres – 2000
- Medal of Pushkin – 2000
- People's Artist of Azerbaijan Republic – 30 May 2002
- Shohrat Order – 25 October 2006
- Gold medal of the Russian Academy of Arts – 2012
- Sharaf Order – 25 October 2016
- "Star of the Union" award of the Commonwealth of Independent States – 2017
- Order of "Istiglal" (for great services in the development of Azerbaijani culture)
