= Elbey Rzaguliyev =

- Born: Elbəy Rzaquliyev; 17 June 1926; Baku, Azerbaijan
- Died: 15 September 2007 (aged 81); Baku, Azerbaijan
- Known for: Artist, stage director
- Awards: Honored Art Worker of Azerbaijan (1964), People's Artist of Azerbaijan (1977), Shohrat Order of Azerbaijan

Elbey Mirza-Hasan oglu Rzaguliyev (Azerbaijani: Elbəy Rzaquliyev; 17 June 1926 – 15 September 2007) was an Azerbaijani Soviet artist and stage director, and father of artist Ayten Rzaguliyeva.

== Life ==
Elbey Rzaquliyev was born on June 17, 1926, in Baku. After graduating from the Azim Azimzade Azerbaijan State Art School, he entered the art faculty of VGIK (All-Union State Institute of Cinematography) in 1946. Upon completing his studies, he began working at the "Azerbaijanfilm" film studio in 1953. From that point, his creativity developed in two main directions: as a painter and a film artist.

His solo exhibitions were successfully held in Baku in 1960 and in Moscow and Kaunas between 1960 and 1967, attracting the attention of art lovers. In 1977, he was awarded the honorary title of People's Artist of Azerbaijan, the USSR State Prize in 1986, and the "Shohrat" Order in 1998. He also served as the secretary of the Union of Artists of Azerbaijan.

Some of his notable works include "Young Builders of Dashkasan", "Ali Bayramli Power Plant", "Land of People", "Among Flowers", "Red and White Roses", "Still Life with Dagger and Household Items", "Taj Mahal", "Japan Series", "Workers", "Mother", "Assemblers", "In the Village", and many others, which garnered great interest. He also worked as a set designer for films such as "Sevil", "Arshin Mal Alan", "The Meeting", "Stepmother", "His Great Heart", "Two Boys from the Same Neighborhood", "The Telephone Girl", "The Last Night of Childhood", and others.

He died on September 15, 2007, at the age of 81.

== Titles ==
- People's Artist of Azerbaijan - 5 December 1977
- Honored Art Worker - 29 June 1964
- The USSR State Prize - 26 April 1986
- Medal "For Distinguished Labour" - 9 June 1959
- Shohrat Order - 19 June 1998

== Education ==
- The Azim Azimzade Azerbaijan State Art School, Baku
- Gerasimov Institute of Cinematography, Moscow

== Filmography ==
- 1991 – Gazalkhan
- 1987 – Ringleader
- 1982 – Here you'll not be met by paradise
- 1979 – Interrupted serenade
- 1977 – Punch in the back
- 1974 – Winds blow in Baku
- 1974 – Along dangerous marine way (short film)
- 1973 – Arrival of the violin
- 1973 – It's dangerous to go to the sea (short film)
- 1971 – A day has passed
- 1970 – Sevil
- 1986 – The last night of childhood
- 1966 – Arshin mal alan
- 1963 – There is such an island, too
- 1962 – Telephonist girl
- 1957 – Two from the same quarter
- 1955 – Meeting
- 1955 – Lovely song
