= Vidadi Narimanbekov =

Azerbaijani painter

Vidadi Narimanbekov Vidadi Nərimanbəyov
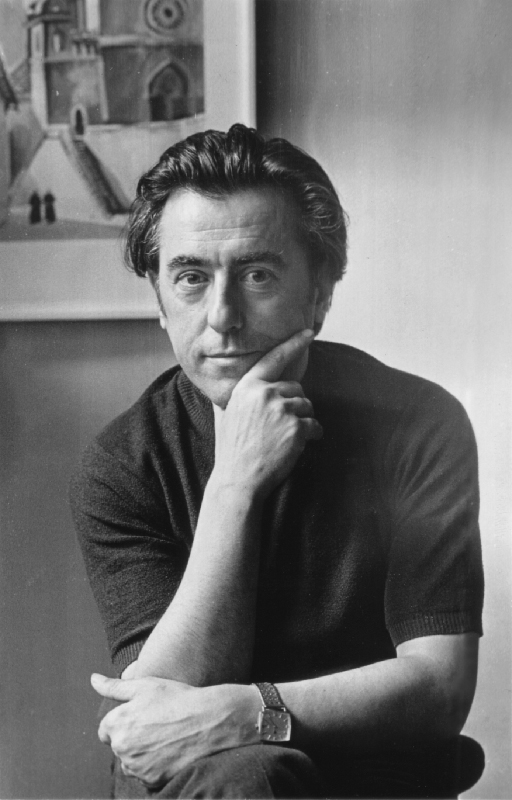
- Born: Vidadi Yaqub-Fərman oğlu Nərimanbəyov; July 13, 1926; Cannes, France
- Died: December 13, 2001 (aged 75); Baku, Azerbaijan
- Citizenship: France, USSR, Azerbaijan
- Occupation: Painter
- Family: Narimanbekov family
- Awards: Honored Art Worker of the Azerbaijan SSR People's Artist of the Azerbaijan SSR Soviet Order of the Badge of Honor Shohrat Order
- Website: http://vidadinerimanbeyov.blogspot.com

Vidadi Narimanbekov (Azerbaijani: Vidadi Nərimanbəyov; 13 July 1926 – 13 December 2001) was a painter, Honored Art Worker and People's Artist of the Azerbaijan SSR.

== Biography ==
Vidadi's father Farman Narimanbekov was born in Shusha. He was one of the 40 people who went to Europe to study in Azerbaijan Democratic Republic. When he was in Europe, he started dating a Parisian lady, Irma Lya. The young family had been living in France for a long time. Vidadi Narimanbekov was born in Cannes in 1926. He returned to his native country in 1929 with his parents. The Great Patriotic War also had an effect on the family. One of the victims of repression by Azerbaijani citizens studying in Europe was Farman Narimanbekov. Farman Bay was exiled to the Russian city of Kolyma, and his wife and children were exiled to Uzbekistan. As a result of the acquittal of Farman Narimanbekov, both his sons were educated and improved their skills in fine arts.

In 1943 Vidadi Narimanbekov entered a Painting School named after Azim Azimzade. In 1944, he was drafted into the army, in which he served for six years. After graduating from the Painting School, he studied at Saint Petersburg Art and Industry Academy named after Vera Mukhina in 1953-1956. From 1957 to 1960 he studied at Tbilisi State Academy of Arts. His diploma work was the painting “Hard Years” on military topics, became a priority in his work. V. Narimanbekov became famous as a student with the "Joy of the enemy ...".

He became a member of the Union of Artists of the USSR in 1961. Vidadi Narimanbekov was awarded the title of People's Artist of the Azerbaijan SSR in 1982 and the Order of Glory (Shohrat Order) in 2001. The artist participated in All-Union art exhibitions. His personal exhibitions were held in France in 1992 and 2000.

In the fall of 1977, Vidadi Narimanbekov's personal exhibition was opened in the Vajiha Samadova exhibition hall. Heydar Aliyev, the first secretary of Central Committee of the Communist Party of the Azerbaijan SSR, came to the exhibition and a day later newspapers published the news that Vidadi Narimanbekov was honored with the title of Honorary Artist.

The main theme in his works is humanity. Happiness, sadness, joy and other feelings are reflected in his works. The "Memories" contains enough tension and excitement in it. The woman, who has been sending her husband to the frontline, has been overwhelmed with expectation. The artist has worked with incredibly convincing, artistic, and memorable nuances that generated a hate to wars in the audience. The work has been successfully exhibited in the exhibition halls of 107 countries since its creation. Vidadi Narimanbekov's first large volume dashboard was "On the Road" monumental painting (1963).

Vidadi Narimanbekov's personal exhibitions were held in the former USSR, also in Hungary, the Czech Republic, Bulgaria, Romania, Algeria, Finland, and 20 other foreign countries.

The artist died on December 13, 2001, in Baku. In 2006 90th Anniversary Exhibition was held in National Art Museum of Azerbaijan. Vidadi Narimanbekov was the brother of Togrul Narimanbekov and father of Nigar Narimanbekova.
