= Rzagulu Najafov =

Azerbaijani journalist (1884–1937)

- Rzaqulu Nəcəfov
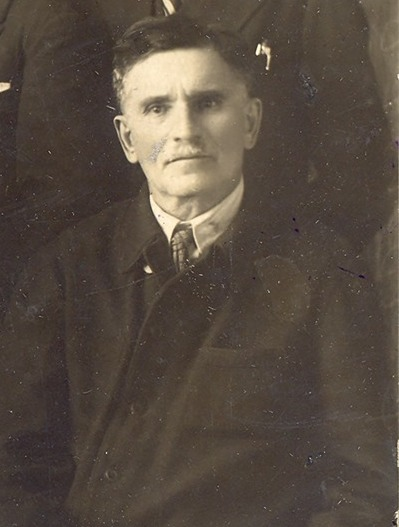
- Born: Rzaqulu Məşədi Ələkbər oğlu Nəcəfov; 1884; Nakhchivan, Russian Empire
- Died: 29 October 1937
- Occupations: Publicist, journalist, public figure, editor
- Writing career
- Language: Azerbaijani

Rzagulu Najafov (Azerbaijani: Rzaqulu Məşədi Ələkbər oğlu Nəcəfov; 1884 – 29 October 1937) was an Azerbaijani publicist, journalist, editor and public figure. He was associated with the Azerbaijani press of the early 20th century, including the satirical magazine Molla Nasraddin, and later worked in editorial and public positions in Tiflis and Baku.

== Early life and education ==
Rzagulu Najafov was born in 1884 in Nakhchivan into an intellectual family. He received his early education at a local religious school and later studied at Məktəbi-tərbiyə (lit. 'School of Education'), founded in the city by Mahammad Taghi Sidgi. He continued his education in Erivan and Tiflis, and learned Arabic, Persian, Russian and Georgian.

His brother, the satirical poet and publicist Aligulu Gamgusar, was among the figures who influenced his intellectual development. After the early death of his father, Najafov returned to Nakhchivan and worked at the customs office in Julfa. He was also involved in revolutionary activity and took part in the Persian Constitutional Revolution.

== Journalistic and public activity ==
In 1912, Najafov moved to Tiflis and was appointed second editor of Molla Nasraddin. Musa Guliyev describes him as an assistant to his brother Aligulu Gamgusar, who was then associated with the magazine. Najafov also contributed to Russian-language newspapers published in Tiflis.

Najafov later recalled that his connection with Molla Nasraddin had begun while he was still living in Nakhchivan, before the magazine was first published. He was close to Jalil Mammadguluzadeh and corresponded with the magazine from Nakhchivan.

According to Guliyev, during the Azerbaijan Democratic Republic period, Najafov served as consul of the Azerbaijani government in Tiflis. After the establishment of Soviet rule, he was a member of the Transcaucasian Central Executive Committee. He worked as deputy editor and later editor-in-chief of Yeni fikir (lit. 'New Thought'), and as editor of Dan ulduzu (lit. 'Morning Star'). He also helped young people from Nakhchivan who were studying in Tiflis and served as director of the Tiflis Azerbaijan State Drama Theatre.

Najafov wrote under several pen names, including Mozalan, Bir müsəlman, Lağlağı, N.R. and R. Nəcəfzadə. His articles appeared in periodicals such as Bürhani-tərəqqi, Həqiqət, Molla Nəsrəddin, Maarif işçisi, Yeni fikir and Yeni Gəncə.

== Later years and death ==
In 1927, Najafov was placed under official scrutiny after publishing an article titled Hüznlü bir xatirə (lit. 'A Sorrowful Memory') in Dan ulduzu. The article was dedicated to the educator, publicist and philanthropist Gurbanali Sharifzade. Najafov was accused of misusing the Soviet press and his official position.

The literary scholar Aziz Sharif later wrote about the incident in his memoir Keçmiş günlərdən (lit. 'From Past Days'). According to Sharif, Najafov had known Gurbanali Sharifzade personally and valued his public activity. Later accounts state that Jalil Mammadguluzadeh appealed to Teymur Huseynov, who worked in the Transcaucasian Party Committee, after which the campaign against Najafov ended.

Najafov moved to Baku in 1930 and worked at a publishing house. During the Soviet repressions, he was kept under surveillance, and several of his relatives in Baku and Nakhchivan were also arrested or killed.

Some official documents give his year of death as 1938. Guliyev, however, cites NKVD records listing Rzaqulu Alakbar oghlu Najafov among those executed on 29 October 1937, with his arrest dated 27 September 1937.
