= House-Museum of Jalil Mammadguluzadeh (Tbilisi) =

- Cəlil Məmmədquluzadənin Ev-Muzeyi
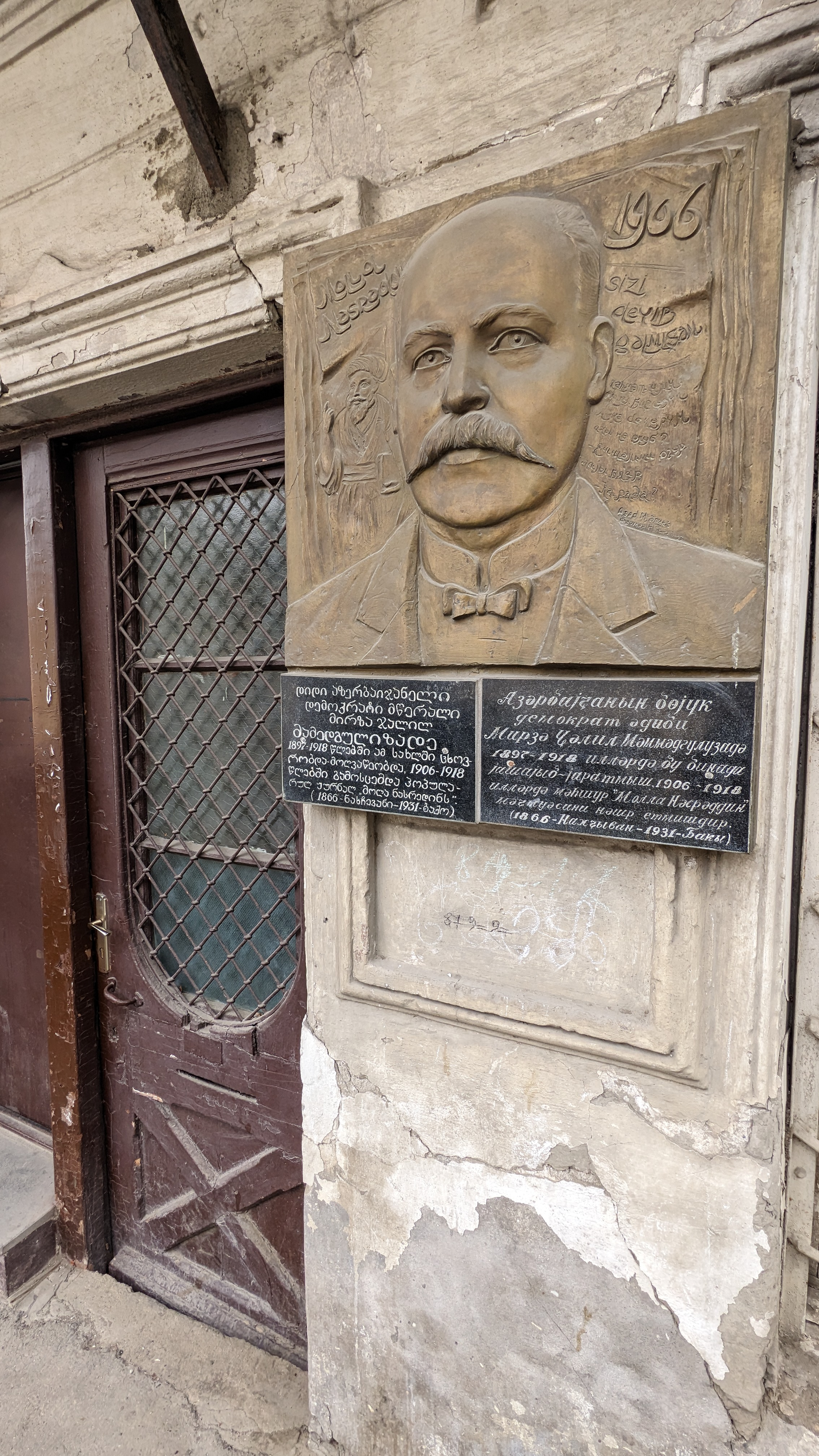
- Established: 1997
- Location: 24 Besiki Str., Tbilisi, Georgia
- Coordinates: 41.696794°N 44.794321°E
- Type: House-Museum

The House-Museum of Jalil Mammadguluzada is a museum in Tbilisi dedicated to Jalil Mammadguluzadeh, the publisher of Molla Nasraddin. It was openedened on 11 October 1997. Mammadguluzada lived and worked in this house from 1897 until 1918. From 1906 until 1911, he published the magazine Molla Nasraddin from here.

The museum contains documents and photographs reflecting the writers' activities in Tbilisi, posters of the featured films based on his works, the copies of Molla Nasraddin. The Geyrat printing house, which printed the magazine, was located in the basement of the building.

The museum is located on the first floor of a two-story building, which is over 200 years old. At one time, both floors of the building belonged to Mammadguluzada. After the Soviet occupation, tenants were settled in the building and only a two-room apartment on the ground floor was preserved as a house-museum. The museum fell into disrepair.

== See also ==
- Jalil Mammadguluzadeh
- House-Museum of Jalil Mammadguluzadeh (Baku)
- House-Museum of Jalil Mammadguluzadeh (Nakhchivan)
