= Abdulkhalig Akhundov =

Azerbaijani physician and publisher (1863–1950)

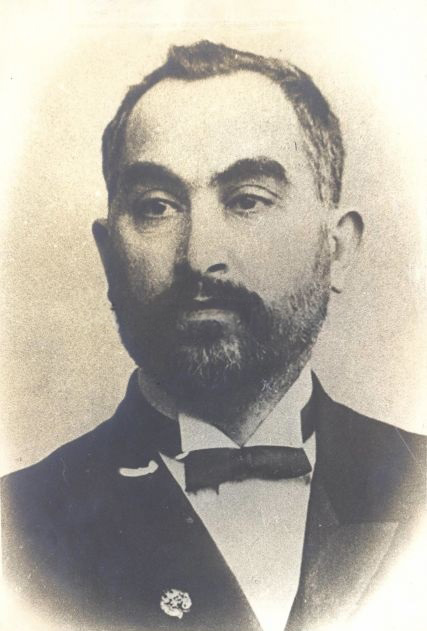
- Native name: Əbdülxalıq Hüseyn oğlu Axundov
- Born: Abdulkhalig Huseyn oghlu Akhundov; December 13, 1863 Baku, Baku, Baku Governorate, Russian Empire
- Died: 1950 (aged 86–87) Tehran, Pahlavi Iran

Abdul-Chalig Achundow, Abdul-Chalig Achundoff or Abdul Khalik Akhundof (Azerbaijani: Əbdülxalıq Axundov; 13 December 1863 – 1950), was an Azerbaijani physician, researcher in ophthalmology and pharmacology; publisher, writer and translator. He was the founder of Zanbur, a satirical magazine published in Baku from 1909 to 1910.

== Biography ==
=== Early life and education ===
Abdulkhalig Akhundov was born on 13 December 1863 in Baku to a family of blacksmiths. First, he studied in a private maktab, then in the madrasa of Mirza Hasib Qudsi in Icherisheher. In 1877–1884, he continued his education at the Baku Realni School. Over the years he had learned Arabic, Persian and Russian languages.

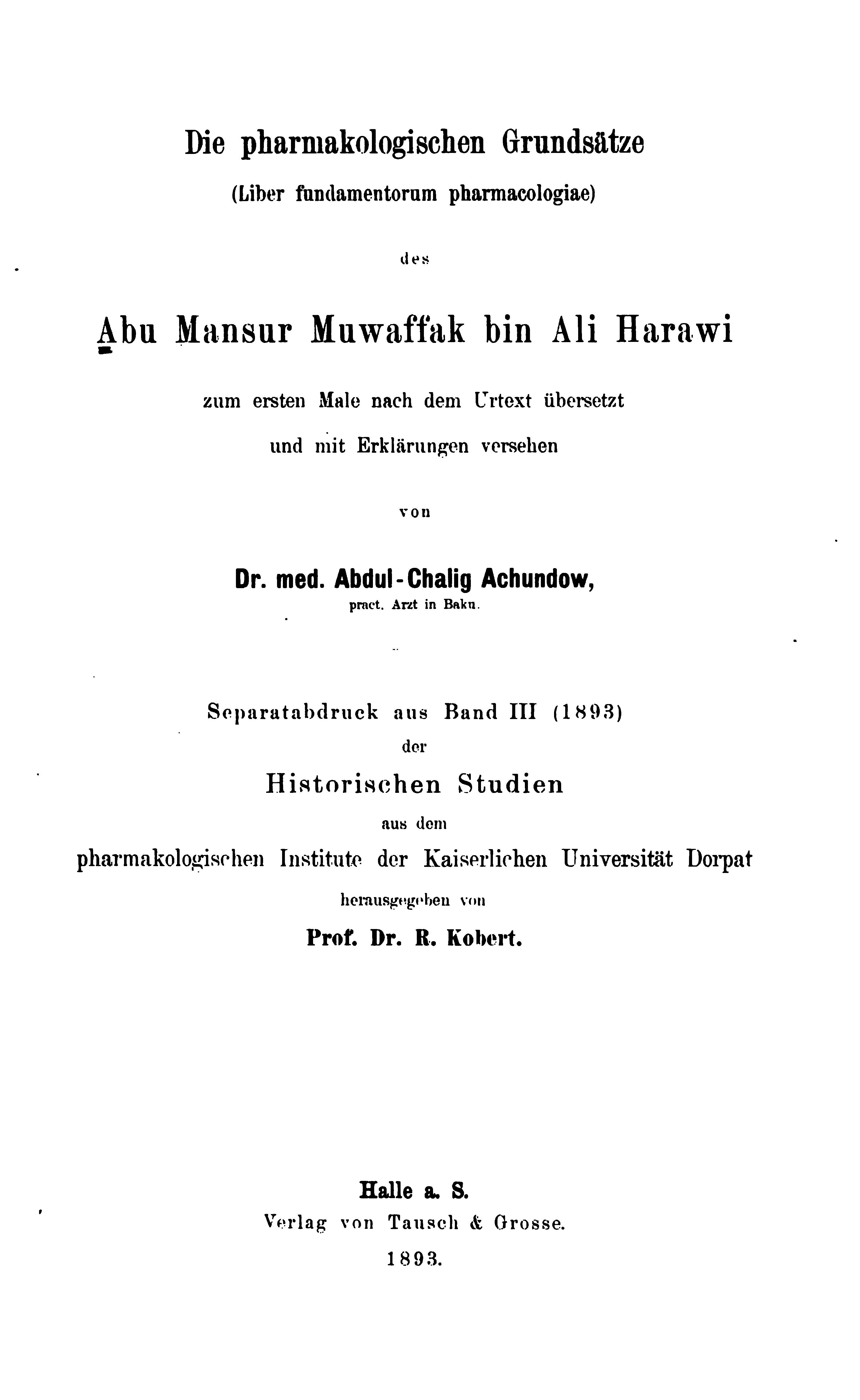
Die pharmakologischen Grundsätze (Liber fundamentorum pharmacologiae) des Abu Mansur Muwaffak bin Ali Harawi by Dr. Abdul-Chalig Achundow

In 1888, he defended his thesis on eye diseases at the Medical Faculty of the University of Erlangen in order to obtain a master's degree. The thesis Klinische Beiträge zur Lehre vom Colomboma oculi was published two years later. In 1892, he defended his doctoral dissertation Commentar zum sogennenten Liber fundamentorum pharmacologiae des Abu Mansur Muwaffak-Ben-Ali-el Hirowi at the University of Dorpat. Abu Mansur Harawi's Ketāb al-abnīa ʿan ḥaqāʾeq al-adwīa was translated for the first time from the original text, provided with explanations in German by him and published in the next year.

=== Career ===
At the end of the 19th century after returning to Baku, Dr. Akhundov opened the first eye disease center and two pharmacies here. He was also one of the founders of the first psychiatric clinic in Azerbaijan together with Dr. Mammadrza Vakilov. He worked in this clinic, which was opened on April 24, 1892, until 1903. In 1895, together with Mammadrza Vakilov and Karim Bey Mehmandarov, he founded the Baku Medical Society.

Abdulkhalig Akhundov was a playwright, author of the First Causerie Then the Stock (Azerbaijani: Əvvəli hənək axırı dəyənək; published in 1901). He published many articles in the periodical press of Azerbaijan at that time. He was a member of the editorial board of Takamul newspaper. He was one of the founders and secretary of the Saadat Charity Society, a member of the Muslim Charity Society, Nashri-Maarif Society and the Baku City Duma.

A. Akhundov was the founder and publisher of Zanbur, which was published in 1909–10 in Baku. Zanbur, like the other Baku-based Azerbaijani satirical periodicals, focused on greater education for Muslims, waged a consistent struggle for women's rights, and opposed Russian and European colonial policies. Among its contributors were Azim Azimzadeh (the second editor of the magazine), Mirza Mehdi Asgarzadeh, Ali Abbas Muznib, Samad Mansur and contributors of Molla Nasreddin such as Mirza Alakbar Sabir, Ali Nazmi, Aligulu Qamkusar and others. This magazine was suspended by the Russian authorities after its 28 issue of 1910.

Later Dr. Akhundov published mass books in Azerbaijani such as The Book of Treatment (1914), Children's Hygiene (1916) and The Troubles of the Digestive System (1919).

=== Death ===
After the Sovietization of Azerbaijan, he moved to Iran, first lived in Rasht and Ardabil, then in Tehran, and worked as a doctor. Dr. Abdul-Chalig Akhundov died in Tehran in 1950 and was buried in Qom.
