= Bahruz Kangarli =

Azerbaijani painter (1892–1922)

Bəhruz Kəngərli
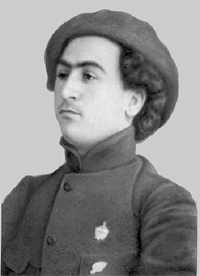
- Born: Bahruz Shiralibey oglu Kangarli; 22 January 1892; Nakhchivan, Erivan Governorate, Russian Empire
- Died: 7 February 1922 (aged 30); Nakhchivan, Azerbaijan
- Known for: Artist

Bahruz Shirali bey oglu Kangarli (Azerbaijani: Bəhruz Şirəlibəy oğlu Kəngərli; 22 January 1892, Nakhchivan – 7 February 1922, Nakhchivan) an Azerbaijani artist who paved the way for innovation with his realistic works by working in the first academic painting style in the art of Azerbaijani painting.

Bahruz Kangarli's artistic legacy, which consists of about 2000 works of various themes and genres, has attracted the attention of the general public, has been collected successively and has become the decoration of exhibitions and museum expositions.

== Biography ==
=== Early years ===
Bahruz Kangarli was born on January 22, 1892, in the city of Nakhchivan. The artist's mother, Aziz, died when Bahruz was a baby, after that, his father, Shirali Bey, married Shirin Khanim. Two daughters, Tahira and Mansura, were born from this marriage. In the 1910s, after the death of Shirali bey, Shirin was married to the artist's uncle, Gadir Agha. Three children were born from this marriage - Davud, Rustam and Gultaj.

His father, Shirali bey, studied at the gymnasium, studied Persian and Russian languages, got acquainted with Eastern and European literature, was recognized as an advanced intellectual, and worked as a translator in the city court. He sent his son to study in a new type of city school called "Khayriyya". Bahruz Kangarli benefited from the books and picture books brought home by his father, showed interest in drawing from an early age, copied pictures, and tried to increase his level of knowledge by learning Russian. Bahruz, who lost his hearing when he was young, spends all his time drawing pictures, getting caught up in his dream world. Leafing through Molla Nasreddin magazine, to which his father subscribed, fed Bahruz's. spiritual world. He got acquainted with the columns and caricatures published in the magazine, and learned the secrets of drawing by drawing the copies of funny pictures. These first habits strengthened Bahruz's love for painting. For this purpose, Bahruz Kangarli entered the Tbilisi art school in 1910 and returned to Nakhchivan in 1915 after studying there for 5 years.

Bahruz Kangarli, the first Azerbaijani graduate of the art school organized under the "Society for the Promotion of Art" in Tbilisi, an important cultural center of Transcaucasia, found a favorable ground for the comprehensive development of his talent there. Education at the school was based on the Russian academic education system and was conducted by the city's leading art teachers. Teachers such as Georgian painters Gigo Gabashvili, Alexander Mrevlesvili, sculptor Yakov Nikoladze, Oskar Schmerling, who cooperated with Molla Nasreddin magazine, taught their students the principles of professional painting and the achievements of European culture. Bahruz Kangarli's drawings and paintings during his student years under the influence of Molla Nasreddin magazine clearly prove this.

Examples of Bahruz Kangarli's academic paintings during his studies have reached us. A number of his paintings in pencil, charcoal, watercolors and oil paints, including busts and statues such as masterpieces of ancient Greek and Roman art such as "Head of Apollo", "Laokoon", Michelangelo's "The Rebellious Slave" can be an example. These showed that the young artist had successfully mastered freehand painting habits by working from live nature. He was not satisfied with copying lifeless plaster statues, but at the same time, he also painted portraits of his teachers and fellow students from living nature, and succeeded in reviving the appearance, likeness, and psychological traits of a person in a realistic manner.

During his school years, Bahruz Kangarli spent his summer vacations in the lush meadows of Georgia, on the shores of the Black Sea, as well as in his native Nakhchivan. Known among his compatriots as a skilled artist, Kangarliy was also given certain orders by art lovers. While he was still a student, his first solo exhibition was organized in Nakhchivan in 1914, it attracted the attention of art lovers and was favorably covered in the press. The leading intellectuals of the city highly appreciated the exhibition, and in an article published in the press, they wished that "Bahruz bey succeeds in creating more beautiful and more paintings".

=== Independent artworks ===
After completing his studies and returning to Nakhchivan, Bahruz Kangarli began to play a useful role in the cultural life of his hometown. He exhibited his works in his home, attached special importance to the first initiatives in the direction of artistic education and aesthetic culture of young people, took special pleasure in attracting the artistic demands of modern people to fine art and mass types of folk creativity, and found solace in the fruits of the work done in this field.

In the memory of Academician M. C. Jafarov, interesting information was given about the exhibition of Bahruz Kangarli in a small room in 1919:

He showed his works one by one and enthusiastically explained them to the children and occasionally smiled and said: "You can't clap, you can't clap." It was the first time I saw the artist, who always had a gloomy face and furrowed brows, smile.

Children and teenagers would watch the artist's exhibitions, gather around him while he was painting from nature, and enjoy admiring his skill. Such visual painting habits became living lessons and practice exercises for art lovers. It is no coincidence that young people like Huseyn Aliyev, Adil Gaziyev, Shamil Gaziyev, Ayyub Huseynov, Bagir Maratli, who were later known as artists in Nakhchivan, regarded Bahruz Kangarli as their first teacher and appreciated them highly.

Bahruz Kangarli's free creative activity coincided with the years of intense socio-political conflict, especially the period of aggression and terrorist operations committed by Armenians against the people of Azerbaijan. The artist's paintings dedicated to those subjects have a sharp documentary indictment. Especially the "Refugees" painting series is characterized by the power of realistic generalization, reflecting the social contradictions of the time. Paintings like "Refugee boy", "Refugee woman", "Refugee children", "Nakhchivan ruins" sound like the protest of a sensitive-hearted, humanist artist against national genocide, enmity, and social injustices due to their ideological and artistic content.

Despite the difficult and difficult test years in his native land, Bahruz Kangarli's creative activity and hard work are expanding, and his artistry is reaching the stage of perfection. He tirelessly conducts artistic searches, creates paintings and paintings in the genres of portrait, landscape, and still life painting, imbued with psychological features, spiritual feelings and emotions, distinguished by their lyrical mood. The artist, who understood and revived life from a realistic perspective, revealed his aesthetic practice and said:

I describe this strange world that I see with colors. However, it cannot be the same as what I draw. I try to paint in such a way that it can be the same.

Kangarli was inclined to the method of realism, especially the style of impressionism, which expresses the beauty of man and nature, the harmony of colors, and the freshness of air-light effects in a complete and complete way. In a number of the artist's landscapes, including "İlandagh" landscape with a brush at different times of the day, echoes of the impressionism art trend are clearly felt.

At that time, Bahruz Kangarli's productive activity had a beneficial effect on the cultural life of Nakhchivan, which took the first steps in the field of the formation of educational and cultural centers. The artist is looking for important ways to promote the art of painting, he prepares painting albums called "Nakhchivan Yadigari", tries to distribute such albums among the local population, and conducts interesting conversations among art lovers. A very interesting album called "Nakhchivan Souvenir" depicting the historical-ethnographic monuments of Nakhchivan, national types, costumes, and significant attributes of the local environment is currently preserved in the National Art Museum of Azerbaijan.

=== Role in the development of theater art ===
Bahruz Kangarli also closely participated in the implementation of events related to the development of theater art in Nakhchivan. In 1912, Bahruz Kangarli started working as a theater artist for the first time, giving the artistic composition of Uzeyir Hajibeyov's musical comedy "O olmasın, bu olsun" in the Nakhchivan theater. From 1912 to 1918, the artist painted large-scale panels for more than 40 performances of Najaf Bey Vazirov's "Pahlavanani-zamane", "Haji Gambar", "Musibati-Fakhreddin", Abdurrahim Bey Hagverdiev's "Hungry Men" on the stage of the Nakhchivan Theater. provided stage design and costume sketches. The artist was an unparalleled connoisseur of national folk costumes. He created a lot of costume sketches characterizing the characters of the works he created, attracting the viewer with their historical integrity, national color, rich colors, patterns, and decorations.

In 1917, Bahruz Kangarli Nakhchivan executed stage design, decor and costume sketches for Jalil Mammadguluzade's comedy "The Dead", which was staged by the theater society called "El Mirgosu" under "Kheyriyya" school. He also designed the stage for works such as "The Dead", "Pari Jadu", "Haji Kara", which were staged in 1918, and in addition, he painted a large-scale panel depicting a mountain landscape for the back stage of the theater, which was used in various performances.

=== His work during the Azerbaijan SSR ===
In the summer of 1920, Nakhchivan was occupied by the Bolsheviks' Red Army, the Soviet government was established, and a number of measures were implemented in the field of education and culture. In the new social environment, Bahruz Kangarli finds an opportunity to expand his creative activity. As shown in the memoirs of his contemporaries, in 1920–1921, Bahruz Kangarli created a number of complete, artistically perfect works. Of these, the symbolic image of the Azerbaijani fighters who took part in the First World War - the image of "Golden Soldier" should be especially noted.

On February 15, 1921, at the initiative of the Nakhchivan Revolutionary Committee, an exhibition of about 500 paintings by Bahruz Kangarlini was shown, and a certain part of the funds obtained from the sale of some works to the population was donated to an orphanage in the city according to the artist's wish.

Art critic Asad Guliyev in his book "Essays on 20th century Azerbaijani art" provided extensive information about the life and work of Bahruz Bey Kangarli, a bright representative of Azerbaijani art, based on scientific principles, as well as commenting on the artistic analysis and descriptive features of the artist's works.

=== Death ===
The biography of Bahruz Kangarli shows that a physically weak, mild-mannered, soft-tempered, and hard-working person suffered financial hardships and moral deprivations during his short life, did not receive proper care and assistance from official government offices and wealthy individuals, witnessed the indifferent attitude of ignorant and backward people. He died of lung disease on February 7, 1922, at the age of 30.

== Portraiture skill ==
The real and vivid images of his contemporaries were reflected in the portrait works, which took a leading place in Bahruz Kangarli's artworks. The artist paid particular attention to the requirements of the portrait genre even during his studies, and mastered the habits of analyzing the human form with special demand.

During his education years and in the first stage of his creativity, Bahruz Kangarli paid special attention to the portrait genre, from the first drafts, his class work in the art school, from copies of classical sculptures, to the photos of his close friends, acquaintances, and teachers, most of his early works belonged to the portrait genre. Looking at the chronological list of his works, it becomes clear that the artist paid special attention to portrait works in 1911–15. First of all, it is interesting to consider his "Self-Portrait". In that painting, he presented himself to the audience as an observant, imaginative, thoughtful, creative personality. He is depicted sitting at a table in a school uniform, while thinking. His broad face surrounded by long black hair, thick eyebrows, bright eyes that are forward-looking create a vivid image of the inner world and penetrating personality of a dreamy young man. The portrait reveals that he belongs to the group of creative intellectuals.

In the educational procedures of art schools, it is one of the important requirements to move motionless plaster sculptures and revive the anatomical structure and shape of the human body through light-shadow contrasts. This method, which facilitates the habits of perceiving nature, regulates the artist's vision and regulates the skill of painting. In the paintings "Apollo's head", "Laokoon", "The Rebellious slave" painted by Bahruz Kangarli from antique statues in the same way, portrait features and perfection of form play a decisive role. This aspect also applies to a number of works in which he works with living human figures directly from nature, including "Portrait of an Old Man".

This image, in the quiet eyes of which one can read the reserved expression of the elderly, belongs to the Georgian people according to the specific signs of the national type. As with that oil portrait, Kangarli's teacher Oskar Schmerling's pencil profile portrait is characterized by European national features. The portrait of Kangarli's classmate, Georgian artist Lado Gudiashvili, is lively and natural due to his individual features.

Most of Kangarli's small-scale portraits were executed with watercolors. These paintings, made with a brush following live observations, are often at the level of studies due to their simple and free composition. It is felt that the artist, who could not leave his favorite profession, liked to revive the people who attracted his attention everywhere in his paintings. Most of these were collected in an album in watercolor, pencil, charcoal and black ink in 1911–13. Such paintings, which are repeated under the names "Portrait of a Man" and "Portrait of a Woman", were created with the intention of observing the diversity of the national type.

Contemporaries of Kangarli, intellectuals of Nakhchivan, would order him to paint their portraits. In addition to painting portraits from nature, he would also occasionally enlarge portraits from photographs for profit. The portraits of the artist's cousin Huseyin agha Kangerlinski, grandfather Murtuz agha, uncle Rza, teacher Mirza Mahammad Zamanbeyov, and Asadaga Sultanov are of this kind.

Unlike such commemorative portraits, the artist painted a series of colorful children's and women's portraits, characterized by a true creative spirit. Most of these portraits, painted in 1918–21, attract the viewer with their deep ideological content, social and psychological dimension. The artist's famous series of portraits "Refugees" (1918–20) should be evaluated as an exceptional event in the history of Azerbaijani painting in terms of historical documentation and artistic perfection. The artist, who usually leads a quiet and secluded life and stays out of politics, demonstrated his civic attitude towards the fate of the people, sharp social contradictions, national enmity and massacres, and created a vivid and vivid chronicle of the tragic events related to the reaction and Armenian aggression. The tragedy of the poor and helpless children and women displaced from their homeland as a result of the national massacre attracted the attention of the humanist artist and encouraged him to create images reflecting the suffering and suffering of the innocent victims. As it is known from the memories of his contemporaries, Bahruz tried to extend his helping hand to refugees who were suffering from hunger, need, and financial deprivation. He would invite homeless children to his home, give them food, clothes, shoes, and also take pictures of them. In this way, it would be possible to more vividly observe the heart of the refugees, the sad psychological shades on their faces.

Among the works included in the "Refugees" series, such portraits as "Refugee boy from Janfada village", "Gumsun girl refugee from Afshar village", "Refugee woman", "Refugee boy" are especially memorable. Their sad and hopeless faces show signs of misery, loneliness, fear and torture. These poor people, whose faces are pale, their clothes are torn, and their fate is bitter, are drowning in the sea of sorrow and are waiting for help in asking for mercy, cure, and salvation.

The inner emotions and psychological feelings of the kind-faced, sincere young man in the portrait "Refugee boy from the village of Janfada" are an expression of the philosophy of love for people and spiritual purity. The image of this young man, with his head slightly bent on his right shoulder and his penetrating gaze fixed on the audience, is a living embodiment of Bahruz Kangarli's humanism.

As a rule, Kangarli painted his characters based on living nature, and considered the truth of life as the main criterion for his painting. This can be seen more clearly in a series of portraits dedicated to young babies, teenage boys and girls. Portraits and studies depicting children sometimes awake, sometimes sleeping, in different poses and movements show that the artist tried to carefully study the naivety, innocent and sincere emotions, psychological excitement, age characteristics, and national characteristics of his little heroes. An example is "Portrait of the Artist's Brother". The child's calm face full of life, big black eyes are very meaningful and expressive. The same psychological mood is characteristic of several portraits painted on the subject of "Sleeping Child".

The main merit of Bahruz Kangarli's portrait works is that they are painted with a brush based on the real and lively volume, light-shadow and color relationships characteristic of professional easel painting, not through conventional, approximate, miniature stylization in terms of artistic form. In the art of Azerbaijani painting, he is a brush master who paved the way for innovation and innovation with his realistic works, working in the original academic painting style.

== Legacy ==
Postage stamp was dedicated to the 120th anniversary of Bahruz Kangarli in 2012 Individual creative exhibitions of Bahruz Kangarli were held in Baku in 1947 and Moscow in 1957 at the initiative of the Azerbaijan National Art Museum. Currently, Bahruz Kangarli's works are stored in the Nakhchivan State History Museum and the Moscow State History Museum, in addition to the Azerbaijan National Art Museum. There is a street named after him in the city of Nakhchivan.

In May 2001, by the decision of the Supreme Assembly of the Nakhchivan Autonomous Republic, on the occasion of the 110th anniversary of the artist's birth, the exhibition hall of the Nakhchivan Artists' Union was named after Bahruz Kangarli. In June 2002, the President of the Republic of Azerbaijan, Heydar Aliyev, participated in the opening ceremony of the museum established in memory of Bahruz Kangarli in the city of Nakhchivan and gave a long speech. He praised Bahruz Kangarli's creativity and said, "His works are the national treasure of the Azerbaijan state". In 2012, a postage stamp was dedicated to the 120th anniversary of Bahruz Kangarli.

On May 25, 2016, the Park of Artists named after Bahruz Kangarli was put into use in the city of Nakhchivan, and a monument to the artist was erected.

== Paintings ==
Bahruz Kangarli's artistic legacy, which consists of about 2000 works of various themes and genres, has attracted the attention of the general public, has been collected successively and has become the decoration of exhibitions and museum expositions.

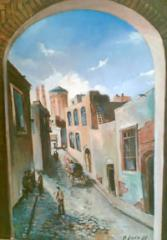
Memories of Nakhchivan (the 20th century)

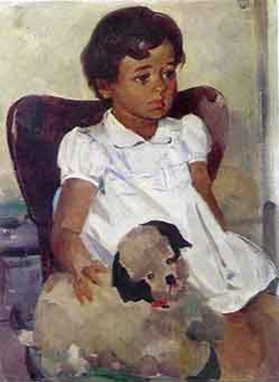
Girl's portrait (beginning of the 20th century)

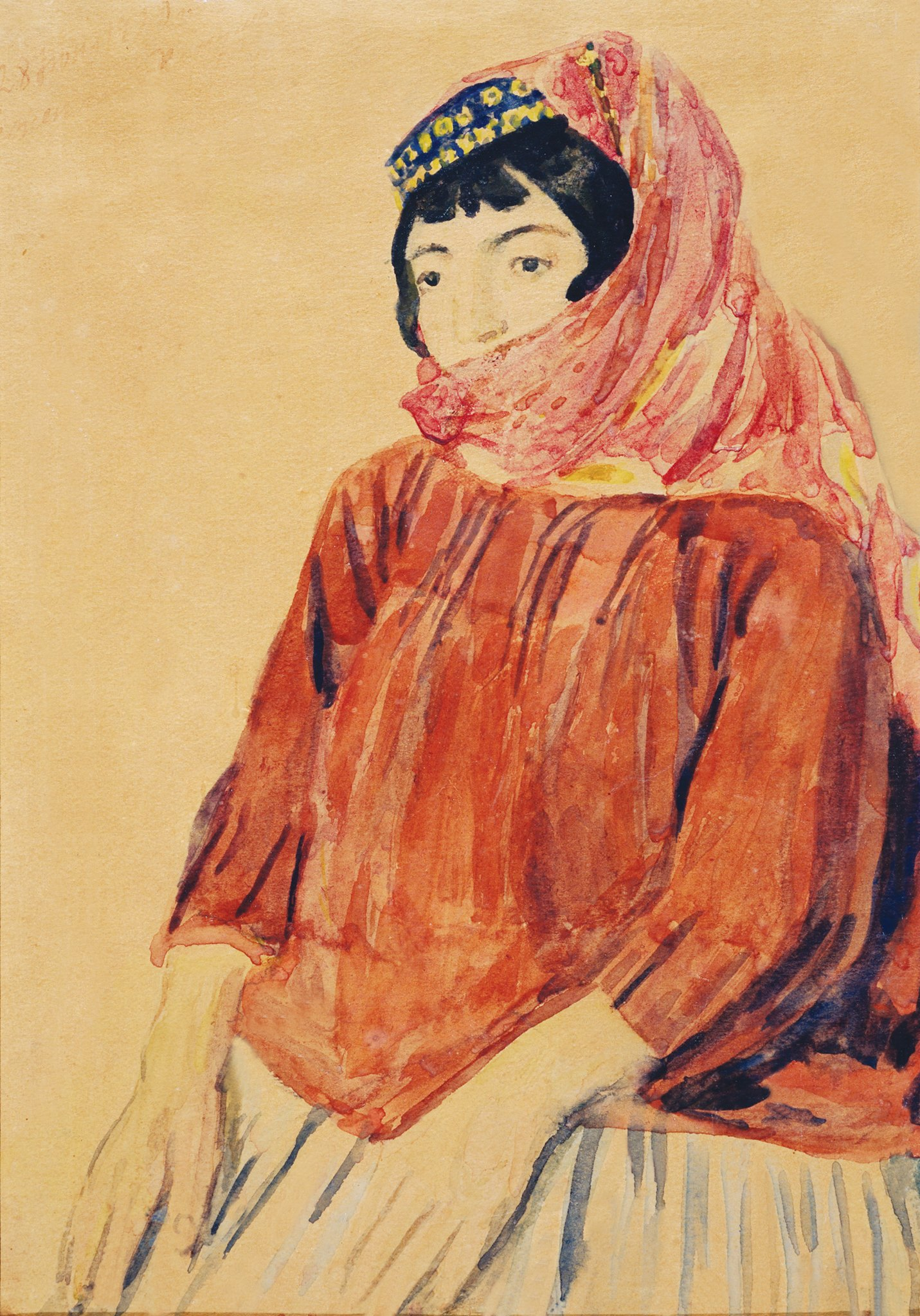
Refugee Woman (1920)

== See also ==
Bahruz Kangarli Museum
