= Mammadrza agha Vakilov =

Azerbaijani doctor and member of parliament

Mammadrza agha Vakilov Məmmədrza ağa Vəkilov
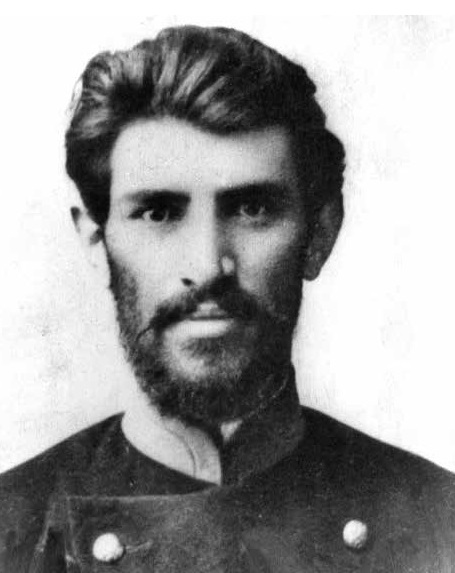

Member of the Parliament of the Azerbaijan Democratic Republic
- In office December 7, 1918 – April 27, 1920

Member of the National Council of the Azerbaijan Democratic Republic
- In office May 27, 1918 – December 7, 1918

Personal details
- Born: March 8, 1864 Salahlı, Kazakh uezd, Elizavetpol Governorate, Russian Empire
- Died: December 30, 1944 (aged 80) Baku, AzSSR, USSR

Mammadrza agha Vakilov (March 8, 1864, Salahli, Gazakh district - December 30, 1944, Baku) was a member of the Parliament of the Azerbaijani Democratic Republic, full member of the Transcaucasian Medical Society, and founder of the Baku Medical Society.

== Life ==
Mammadrza aga Vakilov was born in 1864 in Salahli village of Gazakh district. In 1876, he finished his education at the 1 st Tiflis classical gymnasium. In 1887, he entered the medical faculty of Kharkiv University. He graduated from the university in 1893 and worked as a doctor at the Mikhailovsk hospital in Tiflis for three years.

In 1895, together with Abdulkhalig Akhundov and Karim Bey Mehmandarov, he founded the Baku Medical Society.

In 1896, he was appointed as a field doctor in the construction of the Kars railway line. In 1898, after a 50-bed hospital was established in that area, he was appointed as the director of the hospital. Later, he was sent to Baku railway hospital as a resident-physician.

In 1900, the Baku City Duma for the first time approved the posts of "doctor for the poor". The doctor who performed this duty had to be a field doctor and he had to provide free medical care to the poor living in the city area allotted to him. Mammadrza Vakilov is also appointed to this position. On May 12, 1900, he was elected a full member of the Transcaucasian Medical Society.

After the earthquake in Shamakhi in 1902, he led the team of doctors sent there for help.

M. Vakilov, who has been working as a field doctor for about a year, has repeatedly raised the issue of opening clinics in front of the Baku City Medical Society and the Baku City Duma. At the beginning of 1902, he submitted to the Baku City Duma a project called "Reforms in the Organization of Out-of-Hospital Medical Services in Baku City". The main point of the project was that both the medical structure should be changed and the causes that enable the spread of diseases should be eliminated. Clinics should be opened in different parts of the city so that common people can apply. After a long struggle, he convinced both the medical society and the city duma, and managed to open 6 free clinics under his leadership. Although these clinics initially consisted of only 1 doctor and a few paramedics, they were a huge success for their time.

One of these clinics, City Clinic No. 1 for the poor (now City Polyclinic No. 2), is personally headed by Vakilov himself. He headed this clinic for 20 years. Later, he worked here as a field doctor until 1944. The residents of the city named the clinic "Vakilov Polyclinic" precisely because of this. Already in 1913, there were 10 free clinics in the city.

After the massacres of 1905, he was part of the delegation sent to the peace conference held in Tiflis in 1906 to end the Armenian-Muslim massacres at the initiative of Vorontsov-Dashkov, the Viceroy of the Caucasus.

From 1905 to 1915, he was elected to the Baku City Duma, where he was a member of the school commission and medical-sanitary commission under the city council, and the society of Baku city doctors.

On January 20, 1907, Mammadrza Vakilov together with his brother Mehdi agha Vakilov opened the first Russian-Muslim village school for women in the South Caucasus in Salahli, their native village. The Vakilov brothers assumed the maintenance and expenses of the school.

In 1914–17, he was a member of the permanent commission for oil works under the city chief. On February 10, 1918, he was elected to the Transcaucasian Seim.

=== During the Azerbaijani Democratic Republic ===
In 1918, he was elected a deputy from the Musavat and non-party factions in the Parliament of the Azerbaijan Democratic Republic.

In order to settle the issues with the neighboring Republic of Armenia, on December 9, 1919, by the decision of the State Defence Committee, Mammadrza agha Vakilov was chosen by the Azerbaijani government to represent the country along with Fatali Khan Khoyski and Mammadhasan Hajinski. The Azerbaijan-Armenia conference began work in Baku on December 14, 1919.

=== After the Soviet occupation ===
After the Ganja Uprising, he was arrested on June 15–16, 1920. But they released him because they did not find enough evidence for his arrest. In 1924, he was released from his position and worked as a field doctor in the same clinic until the end of his life.

In 1922, he was involved in the commission that determined the Azerbaijan-Georgia border. After his and Mamay bey Shikhlinski's insistence, the border was removed from the Poylu station and placed beyond the Beyuk Kasik Railway station, and the wintering areas in Garayazi and Jeyranchol were kept within the borders of Azerbaijan.

On October 23–24, 1937, Mammadrza Agha Vakilov was arrested. The indictment accused him of being a counter-revolutionary. During the interrogations, Vakilov did not deny his family ties with the exiled Mustafa bey Vakilov, Alimardan bey Topchubashov, Panah and Mahmud Vakilov brothers, as well as with other repressed persons. In addition, he did not deny his activities during the Azerbaijan Republic and his acquaintance with Rasulzade. He was already 73 years old when he was arrested. After being detained until April 1938, they released him because they did not find enough evidence for his arrest.

Mammadrza Agha Vakilov died on December 30, 1944, in Baku.

== Family ==
His father Mansur Agha Vakilov was an officer in the Tsar army and was awarded the Order of "Saint Anna".

His son, Fakhri Vakilov, was repeatedly elected to the Supreme Soviet of the Azerbaijan SSR. In addition, he held various positions in Azerbaijan SSR.

Mustafa Bey Vakilov, a member of the Parliament of the Azerbaijan Democratic Republic and Minister of Internal Affairs of the Azerbaijan Democratic Republic, was the nephew of Mammadrza Agha Vakilov.

== See also ==
- Abdulkhalig Akhundov
- Karim bey Mehmandarov
