= Taraggi (newspaper) =

Newspaper in Azerbaijan

"Taraggi" newspaper
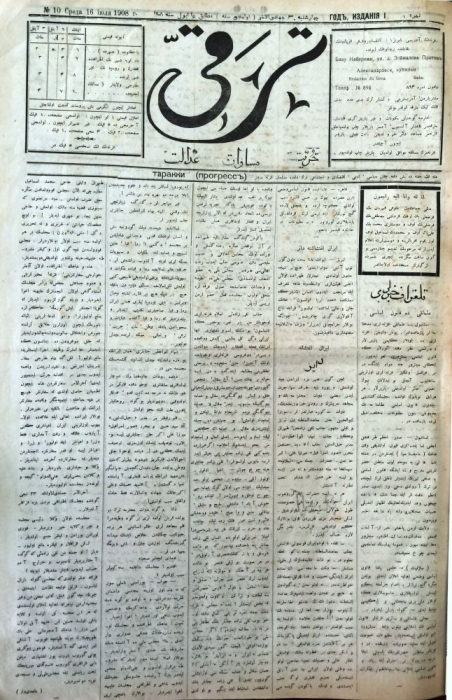
- Founder(s): Ahmet Ağaoğlu
- Publisher: Murtuza Mukhtarov
- Editor: Ahmet Ağaoğlu, Uzeyir Hajibeyov
- Language: Azerbaijani language

Taraggi was a socio-political, economic, and literary newspaper. It was published in Baku in 1908–1909 with the financial support of the millionaire Murtuza Mukhtarov. Its chief editor was Ahmet Ağaoğlu.

Mahammad Amin Rasulzade referred toTaraggi as the first European-style newspaper in Azerbaijan.

== History ==
The first issue of "Tərəqqi" was published on June 8, 1908. Beneath the word "Tərəqqi," the words "Freedom, Equality, Justice" were inscribed. Initially, "Tərəqqi" was published five times a week and later became a daily publication towards the end of the year. Until the 46th issue, the publisher of the newspaper was Ahmad bey Agayev, but from the 46th issue onwards, Murtuza Mukhtarov took over the publication.

Several notable figures contributed to the publication of "Tərəqqi," including Mahammad Amin Rasulzade, Ali bey Huseynzade, Firidun bey Kocherli, Omar Faig Nemanzade, Uzeyir bey Hajibeyov, Mahammad Hadi, Aligulu Gamgusar, and others. Mahammad Amin Rasulzade was one of the most active contributors and authors for the newspaper. His works, spanning various genres, numbered over 100 in "Tərəqqi."

After Ahmad bey Ağaoğlu migrated to Turkey on June 28, 1909, Uzeyir bey Hajibeyov became the chief editor of the newspaper. Under Uzeyir bey Hajibeyov's leadership, "Tərəqqi" published more than 150 articles in various genres, including political summaries, open letters, scientific-pedagogical articles, as well as feuilletons under the general title "Here and There." Additionally, the newspaper featured N. V. Gogol's story "The Overcoat" for the first time in Uzeyir bey Hajibeyov's translation.

Due to financial difficulties, "Tərəqqi" ceased publication after only 434 issues on October 6, 1909.

== See also ==
- History of Azerbaijani press
