= Gusar plain =

Plain in the north of Azerbaijan

Gusar plain Qusar maili düzənliyi (Azerbaijani)
- Plain
- Coordinates: 41.594°N 48.717°E
- Location: Quba District , Qusar District

Gusar plain is a plain between Gudyalchay and Samur rivers in the north of Azerbaijan. It starts from the foothills of the side ridge and extends to the Samur-Devachi plain. It is located on the administrative territory of Guba and Gusar regions.

== About ==
The Gusar plain is located in the north of Azerbaijan, in the northeast of the Greater Caucasus. The plain is wider in the west (25-30 km), narrows in the southeast and ends around the village of Gendob. Its surface is crossed by a number of tributaries of rivers. Of these, Gusarchay and Gudyalchay were cut deeper and their slopes formed box-shaped valleys. The Gusar plain is mainly formed from thick gravel, sand and siltstones of the Upper Pliocene and Quaternary.

When the Great Caucasus mountains rose strongly, the southern edge of the plain also began to rise and its surface became sloping. The southwestern part of the plain along the Gusarchay valley rose up to 1900 meters. Therefore, these areas have a mountainous character.

To the southeast of the Gusar plain, between the Samur-Devachi lowland and the side ridge, there are low mountains formed by Paleogene and Neogene marine and continental sediments. There are Telebi, Gaynarcha dashes, Rustov depression, Valvalachay, Karachay, Agjachay, and relatively wide, some box-shaped valleys of Gilgilchay in the southeast.

== See also ==
- Yazi plain
- Mughan plain
- Garayazi plain
