= Burhani-Hagigat =

Yerevan Azerbaijani magazine (1917)

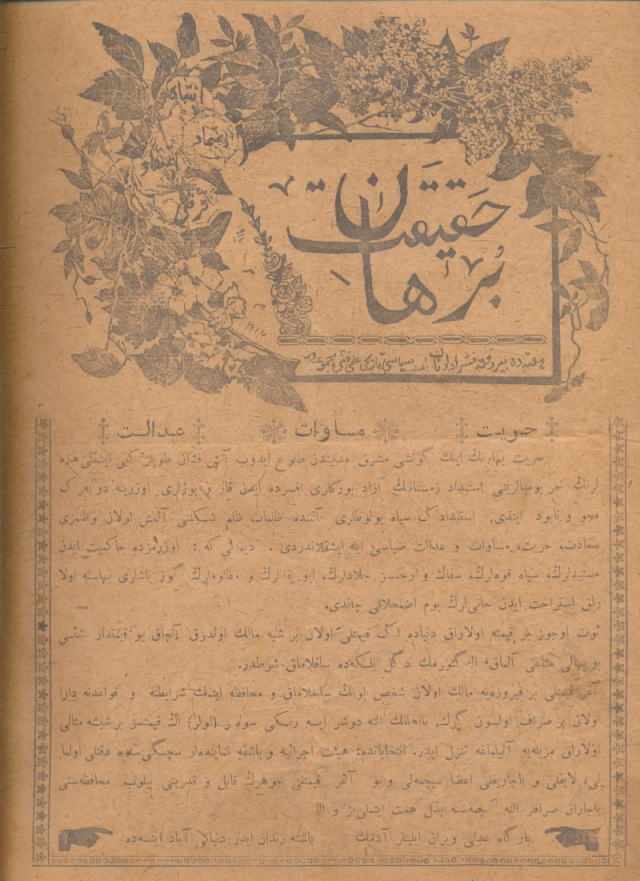
- Editor-in-chief: Ali Mahzun Rahimov; Hasan Mirzazade Aliyev
- Staff writers: Ali Makhzun; Jabbar Askerzade; Mirza Jabbar Mammadov; Rahim Naji; Vahid Muganli; Aligulu Gamkusar; Tahvil Irevani; Sariya Khanum; Fatma Mufida; Artistic contributors:
- Categories: Literary, socio-political
- Founder: Ali Mahzun Rahimov and Hasan Mirzazade Aliyev
- Founded: January 1917
- Final issue: July 1917
- Based in: Yerevan, Russian Empire
- Language: Azerbaijani

Burhani-Hagigat (Azerbaijani: Bürhani-Həqiqət, برهان حقیقت) was an Azerbaijani literary, socio-political magazine published in Yerevan in 1917. It was the first Azerbaijani-language publication published in Yerevan since the closure of the magazine Lek-Lek. It was published twice a month on eight pages from January 14 [O.S. January 1] to July 12 [O.S. June 29], 1917. Nine issues were issued in total. The name consists of the Arabic words burhan ('proof') and hagigat ('truth').

== Publication ==
The first issue of Burhani-Hagigat was published on January 14 [O.S. January 1] 1917 under the direction and editorship of the poet and publicist Ali Mahzun Rahimov and the representative of the Yerevan intelligentsia's publishing house Hasan Mirzazade Aliyev.

=== Authors ===
The authors of the magazine were Jabbar Askerzade (Adzhiz), Mirza Jabbar Mammadov, Rahim Naji, Vahid Muganli, Tahvil Irevani, as well as the poets Shohrat, Nigar, Sariya Khanum, Abdulhag Mehrinisa, Fatma Mufida, Ramziyya and others, among whom were also students of the Yerevan teachers' seminary. Most of them were coming from the tradition of Molla Nasraddin.

== Content ==
Articles about social and political issues occupied a large place in the magazine, but in addition to them, issues of home economics and parenting were also published. Starting from the second issue, Ali Makhzun's work "On Literature" was published in the journal. In 2012, the literary critic Shafag Nasir transcribed all issues of the journal.

== Sources ==
- Вагабова, Э. Р. Вагабова (2015). Краткая история азербайджанской тюркской печати накануне и в годы Первой мировой войны. Ставрополь: Материалы международной научной конференции.
- Məhərrəmov, Ziyəddin (2008). İrəvan türklərinin mətbuat tarixi. Bakı: Açıq Dünya.
