= Bahruz Kangarli Museum =

Bahruz Kangarli museum
- Azerbaijani: Bəhruz Kəngərli muzeyi
- Location within Azerbaijan
- Established: May 22, 2001; 25 years ago
- Location: Ataturk Street, 20, Nakhchivan, Nakhchivan Autonomous Republic, Azerbaijan
- Coordinates: 39.2126°N 45.4124°E
- Type: Art
- Director: Ayten Alakbarova

Bahruz Kangarli museum (Azerbaijani: Bəhruz Kəngərli muzeyi) is a museum for memorial of Azerbaijani painter and graphic artist Bahruz Kangarli. The museum is located in the city of Nakhchivan of Nakhchivan Autonomous Republic at the intersection of Atatürk and Istiglal streets.

== History ==
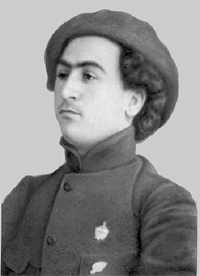
Bahruz Kangarli

In memory of Bahruz Kangarli, a prominent figure in art of painting of Azerbaijan, the museum was established on the order of the Chairman of the Supreme Assembly of the Nakhchivan Autonomous Republic on May 22, 2001, named "About the perpetuation of name of Bahruz Kangarli".

On June 18, 2002, the opening ceremony of the museum took place. The President of the Republic of Azerbaijan, Heydar Aliyev attended the opening ceremony.

After a major reconstruction, the building of Bahruz Kangarli Museum was opened on June 24, 2013.

== Building of the museum ==
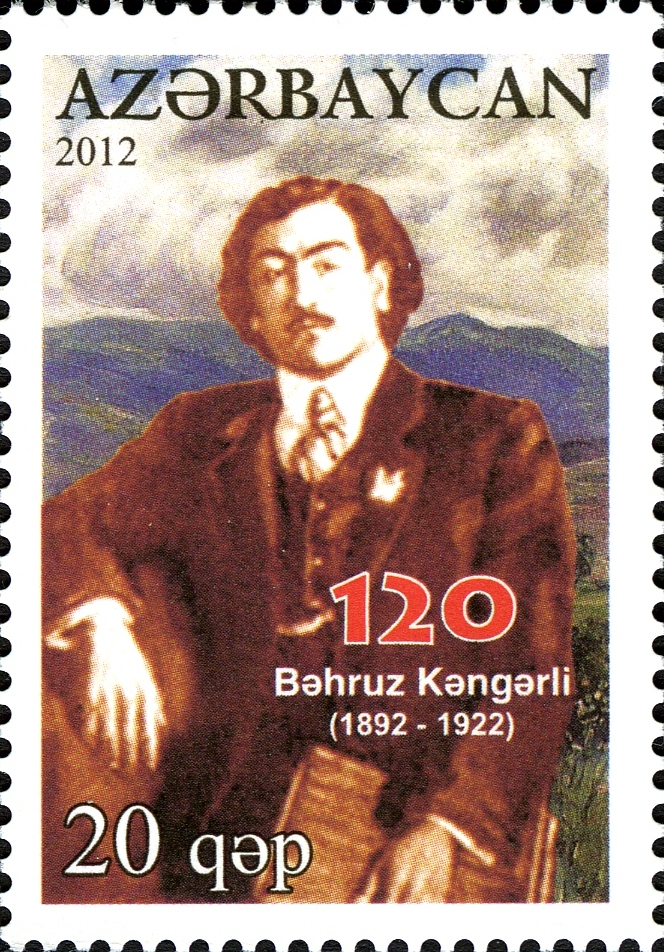
Azerbaijan postage stamp (2012)

The building is an historic-architectural monument and was built in 1897 for the School for Girls of Nakhchivan.

The total area of the building is 560 m² and build of synthesis of architectural elements of East and West. There are 7 rooms on the first, and 5 rooms on the second floor of the two-storeyed building. Entrance to rooms on both floors are from corridors. On the second floor, there is a balcony looking the west. In accordance with climatic conditions, the building was built of raw brick and the facade is covered with baked bricks. The width of the walls is 90 cm. Entrance to the building is from the north. The building was used as an educational institution in the 20th century. First, pedagogical technical school, then medical technical school named after Heyran Khanim located in this building.

== Exhibition ==
Nearly 350 cultural examples are preserved and exhibited in the museum. 58 of them are original works of the artist, 300 are photocopies, documents about his family, life and activity, household items, and other materials.

On April 13, 2012, the president of the Republic of Azerbaijan, Ilham Aliyev signed an order to celebrate the 120th jubilee of Bahruz Kengarli. According to this order, the Supreme Assembly of Nakhchivan prepared and implemented Action Plans. According to the Action Plans, copies of 191 works of Bahruz Kangarli, that kept in the fund of the National Art Museum of Azerbaijan, were donated to Bahruz Kangarli museum. Since then more than 900 exhibits of heritage of Bahruz Kangarli are preserved in the museum. There are 341 paintings of the artist in the museum. 58 of these paintings are original.

== See also ==
- House-Museum of Jalil Mammadguluzadeh (Nakhchivan)
