= Hamid Bey Yusifbeyli =

Azerbaijani politician (1873–1942)

Hamid Bey Yusifbeyli Həmid bəy Yusifbəyli
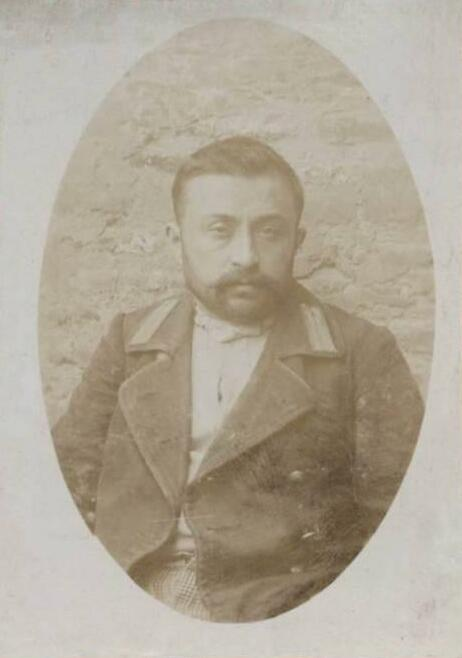

Chairman of the Qeyrat party
- In office 1905–1911

Personal details
- Born: October 13, 1873 Ganja, Azerbaijan
- Died: 1942 at the earliest unknown

Hamid Bey Yusifbeyli, Yusifbeyov or Usubbeyov (October 13, 1873, Elizavetpol, Elizavetpol Uezd, Elizavetpol Governorate, Russian Empire – 1942 at the earliest, unknown) — Azerbaijani politician, educator, teacher. One of the founders of the Ganja committee of the Turkic Social-Federal Revolutionary Qeyrat Party, the Turkic Federalist Party and the Difai Party. Chairman of the Qeyrat party.

During both the Russian Empire and the Soviet Union, he was repeatedly arrested and exiled for his political activities. The last time he was arrested by the USSR NKVD. In 1942, the decision to exile him was issued, but there is no information about his fate after that. It is assumed that he died in one of the prisons.

He is the son of Yusif Bey Yusifbeyli, a lawyer and court advisor, and the brother of Nasib Bey Yusifbeyli, the chairman of the Council of Ministers of the Azerbaijan Democratic Republic and the first chairman of Ganja Branch of the Musavat Party.

== His life ==
=== First years ===
Hamid Bey Yusifbeyli was born on October 13, 1873, in the city of Ganja. After graduating from the Ganja Men's Gymnasium in 1895, he began working as a teacher at the "Maktabi-kheyiriya" in 1898. Under his initiative, secret classes on subjects like geography, history, physics, and mathematics were organized in the madrasa. During this period, Hamid Bey also became involved in political activities. In 1898, he founded the Pushkin Library in his home in Ganja. A year later, in 1899, due to 100th anniversary of Alexander Pushkin's birth, the library was moved to the Huseyniyya Mosque in Ganja. Prominent figures like Abdurrahim Bey Hagverdiyev, Sultan Majid Ganizade, Karim Bey Mehmandarov, S.A. Rustambayli, Sh.S. Shahmaliyev, Haji Mirza Rafiyev, I.L. Sayad, and Y.I. Sizenskaya contributed to the library's growth. Within a short period, the library's collection expanded to over 700 books, and its readership grew to more than 1,200 people.

On December 18, 1899, Hamid Bey Yusifbeyli was arrested for his political activities and taken to Tbilisi. He was detained in the Metekhi prison for 14 months and later exiled to Kokand, Turkestan, where he remained until 1905. Upon his return to Ganja in 1905, Hamid Bey participated in the establishment of the Turkic Social-Federalist Revolutionary Committee. This organization was the first political force in Azerbaijan to advocate for autonomy and the federalization of Russia. The committee later laid the groundwork for the creation of the "Qeyrat" party. Documents show that the leadership of the Turkic Social-Federal Revolutionary Party included prominent figures such as Alakbar Bey Rafibeyli, Alakbar Bey Khasmammadov, Yusif Bey Yusifbeyli, and Hamid Bey Yusifbeyli. Some sources suggest that Hamid Bey was made chairman of the party at the recommendation of Alakbar Bey Rafibeyli. Later, Hamid Bey, along with his brother Nasib Bey Yusifbeyli and their father Yusif Bey Yusifbeyli, joined the newly formed "Difai" party. In 1907, Hamid Bey's house was searched by the Russian authorities, and 24 political books were found, resulting in a formal warning. From 1908 to 1910, Hamid Bey taught at a religious school, where he continued his political activism. In 1909, he opened a library called "Madrasa" in Ganja. An announcement about this library was published in the June 30, 1909 issue of the "Taraggi" newspaper.

In 1908, the Russian Empire initiated a repression campaign targeting members of “Difai” party in Azerbaijan. This began with the arrest of members of the Karabakh Unity Assembly in Shusha, followed by the persecution of the Ganja Committee of the Difai party. The homes of the leading committee members, including Hamid Bey Yusifbeyli, were searched, and revolutionary literature in Russian, French, and Azerbaijani was found. Despite their arrest, Hamid Bey and others were released on August 4, 1909, under the condition of open police surveillance. In 1910, the Russian authorities intensified their repression. N. Akhundov was exiled to Samarkand, and Hamid Bey Yusifbeyli was exiled to Bagchasaray for five years. While in exile, Hamid Bey lived in the house of Ismayil Gaspirali, the father-in-law of his brother Nasib Bey Yusifbeyli. Eventually, he immigrated to Istanbul. However, on February 21, 1913, in connection with the 300th anniversary of the Romanov dynasty, Hamid Bey was pardoned by a decree from Nicholas II. He returned to Ganja in 1914 but remained under constant surveillance until 1917.

After the establishment of the Azerbaijan Republic in 1918, he stopped his political activity.

=== After Soviet occupation ===
After the Soviet occupation, from 1921 to 1930, Hamid Bey Yusifbeyli taught at the Ganja Turkic Pedagogical Technical College, which was named after Mirza Fatali Akhundov. During this period, he also pursued his passion for literature and wrote a play called “Turkan”, which was performed on the stage of the Ganja Drama Theater. On February 27, 1931, his house was searched under warrant number 5 issued by the State Political Administration of Azerbaijan. Although the authorities did not find anything illegal in his possession, they confiscated the manuscript of “Turkan”. Despite this, he was arrested on charges of spreading anti-Soviet propaganda. Hamid Bey was detained for a year by the OGPU, but was eventually released.

In September 1932, he got a job at Kirovabad Industrial Polytechnic. At the same time, he started teaching at school number 15 in Ganja.

On July 16, 1941, Hamid Bey Yusifbeyli was arrested by the People's Commissariat for Internal Affairs (NKVD) under warrant No. 213. He was accused of slandering the Russian people, harboring anti-Soviet sentiments, being a radical Turkic nationalist, and a member of the "Musavat" party. The final indictment, prepared on December 8, 1941, described Hamid Bey as from aristocratic family whose father worked as a bailiff and owned considerable property. It was emphasized that his brother, Nasib Bey, had served as the chairman of the Council of Ministers during the Musavat period. Hamid Bey was accused of conducting anti-Soviet propaganda, spreading hatred against the Russian people, and promoting Turkey. Due to his old age, the authorities proposed sending Hamid Bey into exile for five years. On February 11, 1942, based on the recommendation of Ziyalov and Grigoryan, Special Advisers to the Soviet Union, the USSR decided to exile Hamid Bey to North Kazakhstan for a period of five years. There is no further information about his fate, and it is assumed that he died in one of the prisons during his exile.

On December 31, 1957, the Criminal Cases panel of the Supreme Court of the Azerbaijan SSR acquitted Hamid Bey Yusifbeyli because there was no criminal element in his case. The decision of the court was announced to Hamid Bey's son Anvar Yusifbeyli on January 9, 1958.

== Works ==
- Detailed scientific and theoretical accounting. Ganja: Asgar Haji Hasanzade printing house, 1908 (together with Ismayil Faig);
- Two-part arithmetic problems for beginners. First edition. Ganja: Hagverdiyev company printing house, 1908;
- "Madrasa" library in Ganja. Asamiul-kutub. Bagchasaray: Electric printing house of "Tarjuman" newspaper, 1912;
- Accounting issues for converts. Second edition. Bagchasaray: "Tarjuman" newspaper printing house, 1914.

== Family ==
His great-grandfather, Usub Bey, served as the vizier of Javad Khan in the Ganja Khanate. His father, Yusif Bey Yusifbeyli, studied at the Faculty of Law at Petersburg University and held various legal positions at the Ueaz Court in Elizavetpol. Yusif Bey was also one of the founders of the Turkic Socialist-Federal Revolutionary Party, later known as the “Qeyrat” Party.

Hamid Bey's mother, Buyukkhanim, was a descendant of the Khanbudagovs. Her father, Boyuk bey Khanbudagov, came from Shaki to Borsunlu village in the 1840s, and they were close relatives of the mother of Mirza Fatali Akhundov, famous Azerbaijani intellectual.

In 1909, Hamid Bey married Sariye Khanum Sheykhzamanli, a cousin of Nagi bey Sheykhzamanli. The couple had a son, Anvar. Hamid Bey later married to Bilgeis Najaf gizi Juvarli.

His son, Anvar Bey Yusifbeyli, was born in 1915. In 1933, he entered the Tbilisi Electrotechnical Institute of Communication. After graduating from the institute, he moved to Irkutsk, Russia, to escape persecution. In 1938–1939, he worked as a senior engineer in Irkutsk, and in 1939–1941, he worked as a chief engineer in the Communications Department in Stalinabad, Tajikistan. In 1941, he was drafted into the army due to the outbreak of war. He was captured along with his division. Although he was released from captivity in 1945, he was later arrested. He was acquitted in 1956 and died in 1989. He was buried in the Yusifbeyli family tomb in Ganja.

== Legacy ==
In the house where Hamid bay lived, there was a private library with more than 2,000 books until 1949. The collection included a Russian translation of the "Holy Qur'an" by Ismayil Bey Gaspirali. In 1949, the books were sold to the Ganja Scientific Research Center of the Academy of Sciences of the Azerbaijan SSR to support the children of his brother, Eyyub Bey Yusifbeyli, and his sister, Dilshad Khanum, as well as Gulnar and Rasim Khasmammadov, who were in exile. Most of these books were later lost. However, 120 copies could be found and given to the "Treasure" library created in Shahsevan Mosque in Ganja.

The house where Hamid Bey Yusifbeyli was born and located in the Safarabad district of Ganja is currently home to the Yusifbeyli House-Museum.
