= Badisaba Kocharli =

Azerbaijani educator

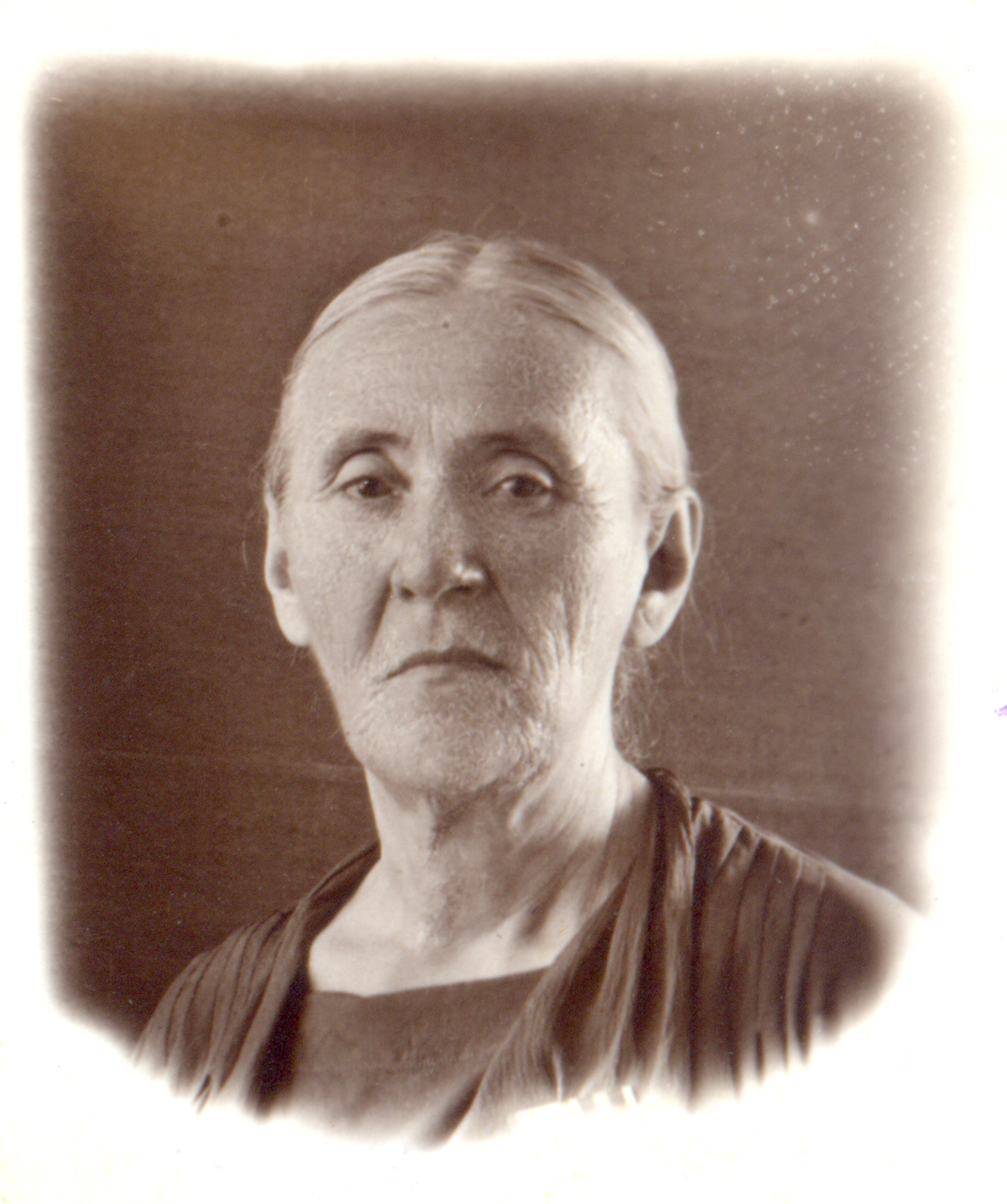
- Born: March 14, 1881; Salahlı, Kazakh uezd, Russian Empire
- Died: January 1954 (aged 72); Baku, Azerbaijan SSR, SSRI
- Occupation(s): educator, philanthropist
- Spouse: Firidun bey Kocharli
- Awards: Order of the Badge of Honour

Badisaba Kocharli (March 14, 1881 – January 1954) was an Azerbaijani philanthropist, educator, and enlightener. She was the wife of the famous Azerbaijani literary scholar and founder of the science of Azerbaijani literary history, Firidun bey Kocharli. Due to the assistance she provided to people, Badisaba Khanum was called the "Mother of the People."

== Biography ==
Badisaba Vakilova was born on March 14, 1881, in the village of Salahlı, Kazakh uezd. Her father was Mustafa agha Vakilov, and her mother was Fatma Vakilova. She had two brothers with the names Mammad agha Vakilov and Ismayil agha Valikov. Her brothers studied at the Transcaucasian Teachers Seminary in Gori together with Firidun bey Kocharli who was from Shusha. In 1897, at the age of 17, she married Firidun bey Kocharli and took his surname. Firidun bey Kocharli engaged in her education while working as a teacher at the Transcaucasian Teachers Seminary in Gori.

While working as the director of Children's Home No. 2 in Shaki, she adopted a child named Roza Hashimova.

Later, she received higher education at the Azerbaijan Pedagogical Institute while working at the Baku Women's Teachers' Seminary.

In 1918, Badisaba Kocharli, using her own funds, opened the "House for Orphaned and Refugee Children" in Qazakh together with Firidun bey Kocharli. After the establishment of Soviet rule in Azerbaijan, the first serious and benevolent step taken by Badisaba khanum in the field of public education was her assistance to the newly organized public schools. She provided significant financial assistance to the schools in Qazakh, donating works by M.F. Akhundov, J. Mammadguluzadeh, R. Efendiyev, F. Kocharli, and other writers, as well as complete sets of various magazines. From 1921 to 1924, she worked as a teacher at the Baku Women's Teacher Training Seminary. The "Materials on the History of Azerbaijani Literature," which F. Kocharli could not see published during his lifetime, was published in two volumes (each volume consisting of two parts) in Baku in 1925–1926 on the initiative of Badisaba khanum after his death.

On May 21, 1925, by the order of the Commissariat of Education, a Pedagogical Technical School was established in Zaqatala, and in 1929, another one was established in Quba. Kocharli led the Zaqatala Pedagogical Technical School from 1925 to 1929.

In 1930, she became the founder and director of Children's Home No. 2 in Shaki. She served as the director of this institution until 1954. This children's home was located in the Zulfugarovs' mansion. Ba Kocharli actively participated in the public life of Shaki city and was a deputy of the Shaki City Council for three terms from 1946 to 1952.

== Awards ==
Badisaba Kocharli was awarded the Order of the Badge of Honor and the Medal "For the Defense of the Caucasus". In 1945, she was honored with the title of "Honored Teacher of the Azerbaijan SSR."

== Popular culture ==
Badisaba Kocharli's activities are reflected in Hajiaga Jumshudlu's novella "Badisaba" and Bakir Nabiyev's monograph "Firidun bey Kocharli."
