= House-Museum of Jalil Mammadguluzadeh (Baku) =

- Azerbaijani: Cəlil Məmmədquluzadənin ev-muzeyi
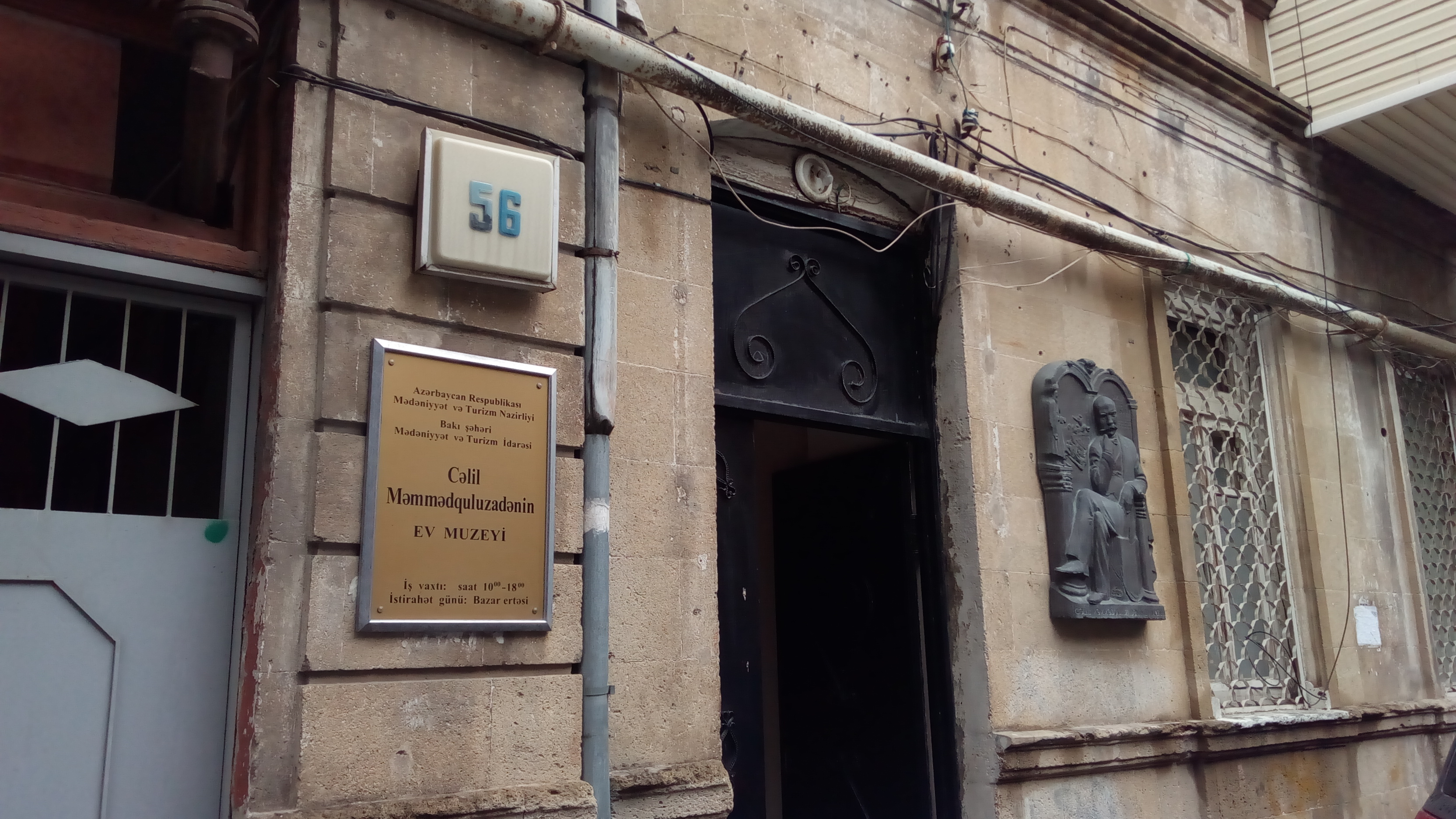

- Location within Azerbaijan
- Established: 1978; 48 years ago
- Location: Suleyman Taghizade Street, 56, Baku, Azerbaijan
- Coordinates: 40.370482°N 49.828772°E
- Director: Perikhanim Mahmudova

The house-museum of Jalil Mammadguluzadeh (Azerbaijani: Cəlil Məmmədquluzadənin ev-muzeyi) is a memorial museum of the famous Azerbaijani journalist, enlightener, writer-satirist, Jalil Mammadguluzadeh. The museum is located on Suleyman Taghizade Street, in the city of Baku, where the writer lived during 1920–1932.

== History ==
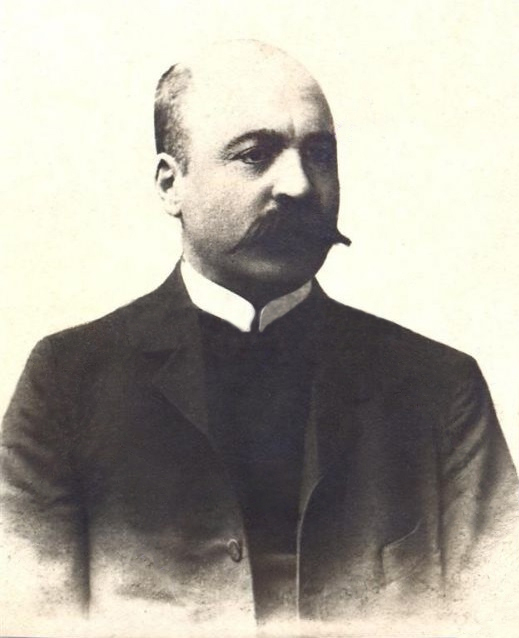
Jalil Mammadguluzadeh

The museum was established on the verdict dated in 1978 by the government of the Republic of Azerbaijan at home in Suleyman Taghizade Street (former Post Street), 56 in Baku, it was opened on the eve of the 125th anniversary of Jalil Mammadguluzadeh on December 28, 1994. The third president of the Republic of Azerbaijan, Heydar Aliyev, attended the opening ceremony and made a speech.

== Exposition ==
About 3000 exhibits have been collected in the museum, reflecting the life and activity of Jalil Mammadguluzadeh and other Molla Nasraddin scholars. Nearly 500 of them are exhibited in the exhibition space of the museum.

The exposition is located in five rooms with a total area of 185 m^{2}. The museum exhibits reflect Jalil Mammadguluzadeh’s childhood, youth and education memories, school activities, his first journalistic and literary activity. The editorial office is about Molla Nasraddin. The materials in the memorial room are on the theme of the life and activity of Jalil Mammadguluzadeh between the years of 1922 and 1932. Here is a map covering the spread of the works of the writer in the world.

== See also ==
- House-Museum of Jalil Mammadguluzadeh (Nakhchivan)
- Molla Nasraddin
