= Omar Faig Nemanzadeh =

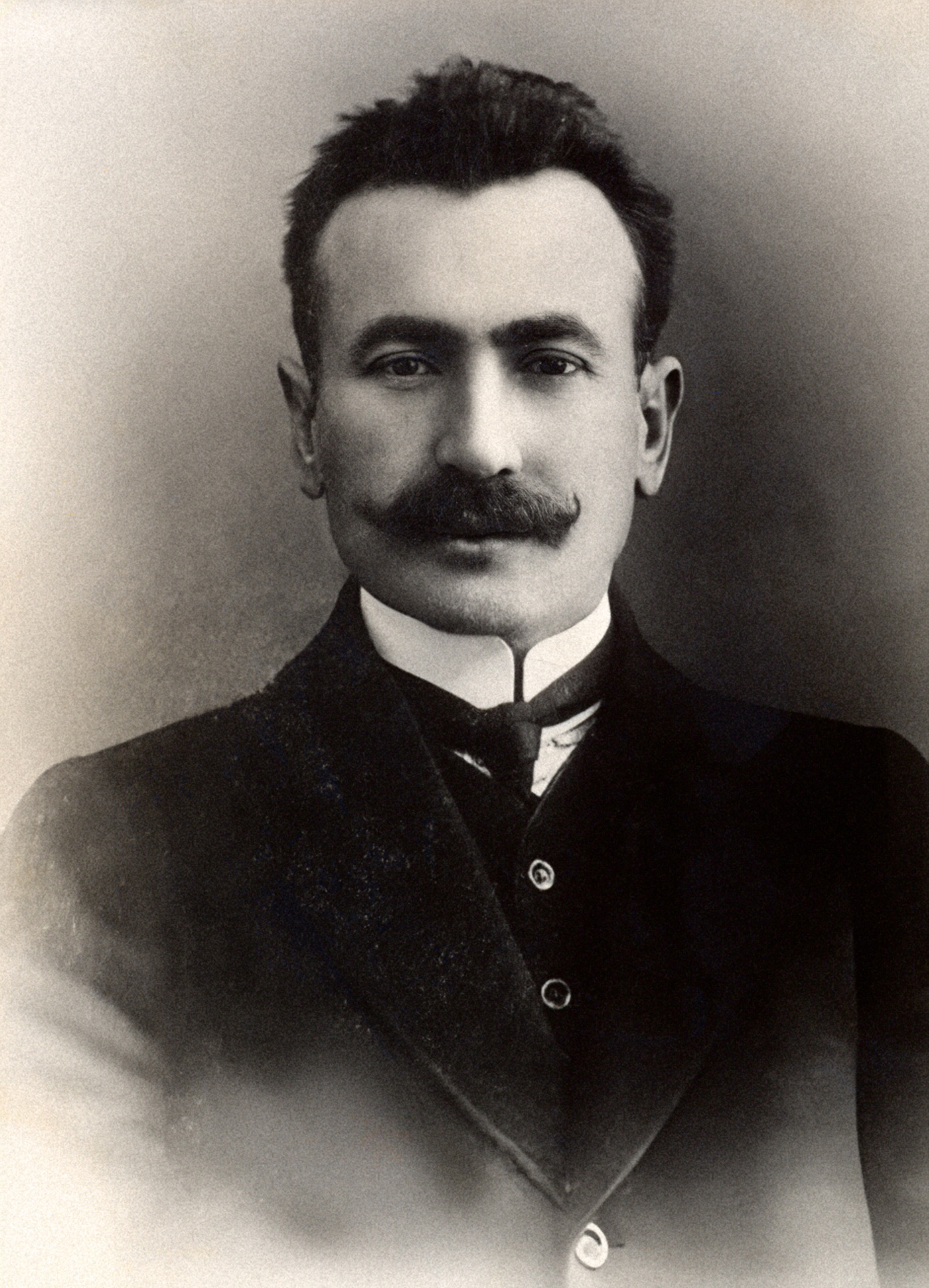
- Born: 24 December 1872; Atsquri, Akhaltsikhe uezd, Tiflis Governorate, Russian Empire
- Died: 10 October 1937 (aged 64); Tbilisi, Georgian SSR, Soviet Union
- Education: Darussafaka, Istanbul
- Occupations: Teacher, journalist and writer

Omar Faig Loman oglu Nemanzadeh (Azerbaijani: Ömər Faiq Nemanzadə, Turkish: Ömer Faik Numanzade) was an Azerbaijani publicist, journalist, teacher, founder and owner of Gheyrat Press and co-founder of Molla Nasreddin magazine, public figure.

== Early years ==
Omar Faig Nemanzadeh was a Turkish Meskhetian and was born in 1872, in the village of Azğur (Atsquri in Georgian), in the Akhaltsikhe uezd of the Tiflis Governorate. When he was 10, his family decided to send him to the Transcaucasian Teachers Seminary in Gori where prominent people of the Caucasus such as Nariman Narimanov, Jalil Mammadguluzadeh, Uzeyir Hajibeyov and others studied. However his mother was a devout Muslim and she was against his education in a school in a Christian town. That is why he was sent to Istanbul and studied at the Fatih Madrasah.

Omar Faig treated religious education skeptically and after two years, he transferred to secular Dar ush-Shafak seminary, where sciences and languages were taught and which had a reputation as breeder of liberal ideas in Turkey.

In the last year of education at this school, Omar Faig began to work at a post office in Galata, and all magazines and newspapers published in Europe passed through his hands. Namely this acquaintance with liberal European ideas had a great significance in his formation. Approximately then Nemanzadeh connected with secret circles, with “revolutionary elements” of Istanbul, who contemplated Sultan’s dethronement. Most likely, the young worker inspired by liberalism ideas provided them with newspapers and soft news. In any case, one fine day police dispersed these circles. Omar Faig Nemanzadeh escaped from arrest barely being in time for a steamship to Batumi.

== Activity ==
Returning to the Caucasus, Omar Faig began to act according to his ideals. He thought that enlightenment is the only way to change the situation – stagnation of the Turkic nation.

“A long social, revolutionary and scientific preparation is necessary in order to destroy principles which are occurred from old traditions and to follow a new road. It’s very hard to achieve such changes in the sphere of culture and education without this preparation and to achieve any success… Development level of the nation can be identified by development level of teachers. Teachers’ issue – is the matter of life and death for the nation.”

Omar Faig began to teach. Beginning from 1893, he established schools in Shamakhi, Shaki, Ganja and Tiflis for ten years. “We consider the opening of schools in native language the most important task of today”, - he wrote in one of the declarations of his comrades – Azerbaijani democrats, whom he joined in 1892. Being always on move throughout the Caucasus and finally settling in Baku, Omar Faig became an outstanding person in socio-political life also due to his publications – particularly, in the only Turkish-language newspaper in Russia Terjuman (Translator). His article, dedicated to the first Muslim female school in Baku – he called it “an incomprehensible miracle” – was saved in archives of Servet-i Fünun magazine of Istanbul. That article drew a wide respond in the Muslim world – few people concurred Omar Faig's thoughts that Muslim girls also need education.

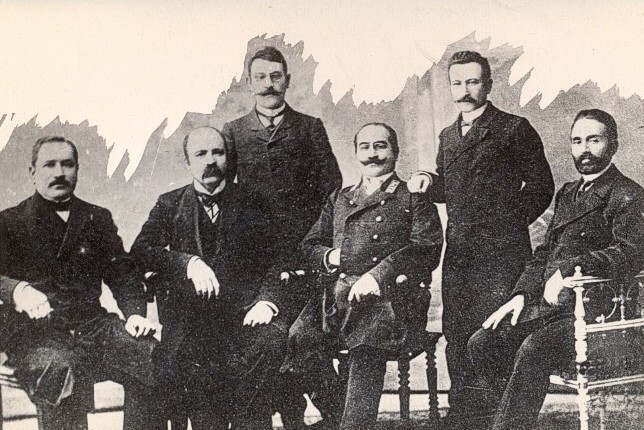
Nemanzadeh (second from the right) with other Azerbaijani writers of the 19th century (Jalil Mammadguluzadeh, Sultan Majid Ganizade etc.)

In 1906, Nemanzadeh decided to publish his own publication. He had an extraordinary idea: to publish a grotesque magazine of caricatures with sharp satires, which could be understood by grassroots and illiterate people. He devised an appropriate name for it – Molla Nasraddin, in honor of a famous and favourite thinker and social critic of the Turkic world, who chaffed greedy people and supported the poor and the honest.

Nemanzadeh could not register the magazine himself, because he was a “problem” person, and authorities were rather afraid of him. He invited his friend Jalil Mammadguluzadeh to work as editor-in-chief. Two Tbilisi Germans, Oskar Schmerling and Josef Rotter, who created an absolutely new style for the magazine, became its illustrators; besides that their illustrations were understandable that they didn't need any signature. Omar Faig and Mammadguluzade devised plots for the caricatures – problems existing in the Caucasus at that time could be seen in these caricatures: illiteracy, the cloistered situation of women, the arrogance of clerks and police outrages.

In due course other poets and prose writers also began to write feuilletons in Molla Nasraddin magazine.

Almost from the first numbers of the magazine caused furor. Nobody expected such a success – soon the weekly magazine began to be published in runs of 5000 copies and spread throughout the Turkic world.

Despite its sharpness, the magazine wasn't prohibited, although it was censored: there can be seen crossed out empty pages in archives. Omar Faig financed the magazine himself, but becoming the publisher he didn't become rich. There also were problems with means. But from 1906 to 1909, the magazine was published without any restrictions. Then he was renewed in 1912, and later in 1917 again. And later the revolution began.

== Hard times ==
Initially, Bolsheviks gave indulgences to people who were against tsarism – they even gave a great house with garden to Omar Faig in Akhaltsike. In 1920, when the republic in Baku collapsed and the Soviet regime was established there, the authorities gave an initiative: to continue publishing of popular Molla Nasraddin magazine by every possible means. And they promised to create all good conditions for it. But Omar Faig refused to participate in this project. He was engaged in other activities, which were closely connected to his nation. Soon he left Baku after the revolution and returned to Georgia – initially he led independent Gars Republic and then entered revolution committee of Georgian Republic as a representative of Muslim population. He always was a respected public figure.

In 1937, he was arrested and shot.
