= Yazi Plain =

Plain in Qubadli District, Azerbaijan

Yazi plain Yazı düzü (Azerbaijani)
- Plain
- Coordinates: 39.340°N 46.634°E
- Location: Qubadli District

Yazi plain is a plain located between Bazarchay and Hakari rivers in Gubadli district of Azerbaijan. Animal husbandry, wheat, tobacco and grape cultivation were widespread in the area before the Armenian occupation.

== About ==
The tomb of Javanshir dating back to the 14 th century is located on the Yazi plain.

=== Toponymy ===
The name of “Yazı düzü” is derived from the combination of the ancient Turkish word "yazi" meaning "desert, wide plain" and the Azerbaijani word "düz" meaning plain. In the territory of Azerbaijan, toponyms with "Yazi" particles are more common. For example: Aghyazi, Garayazi, Agcayazi and others.

=== Geography ===
The Yazi plain, which is on the South-eastern end of the Karabakh plateau, descends to 450 m and passes into the sloping and undulating Inja plain. It is triangular in shape. Its length is 30–35 km. It is composed of volcanic-proluvial sediments of the Upper Pliocene. It has a mild warm climate with dry winters. Brown mountain-forest soils are common. There is a xerophytic montane shrubland and dry steppe landscape. Before the Karabakh conflict, animal husbandry was developed, grain, tobacco and grapes were grown.

== See also ==
- Mughan plain
- Garayazi plain
