= House-Museum of Jalil Mammadguluzadeh (Nakhchivan) =

Historic house museum in Nakhchivan, Azerbaijan

- Azerbaijani: Cəlil Məmmədquluzadənin ev-muzeyi
- Location within Azerbaijan
- Established: December 31, 1998; 27 years ago
- Location: I. Mammadov street, Nakhchivan, Nakhchivan Autonomous Republic, Azerbaijan
- Coordinates: 39.204503°N 45.412599°E
- Type: Literature
- Director: Ayten Alakbarova

The House-Museum of Jalil Mammadguluzadeh (Azerbaijani: Cəlil Məmmədquluzadənin ev-muzeyi) is a memorial museum of the famous Azerbaijani journalist, enlightener, writer-satirist, Jalil Mammadguluzadeh. The museum is located on Idris Mammadov Street in the city of Nakhchivan, the capital of the Nakhchivan Autonomous Republic.

== History ==
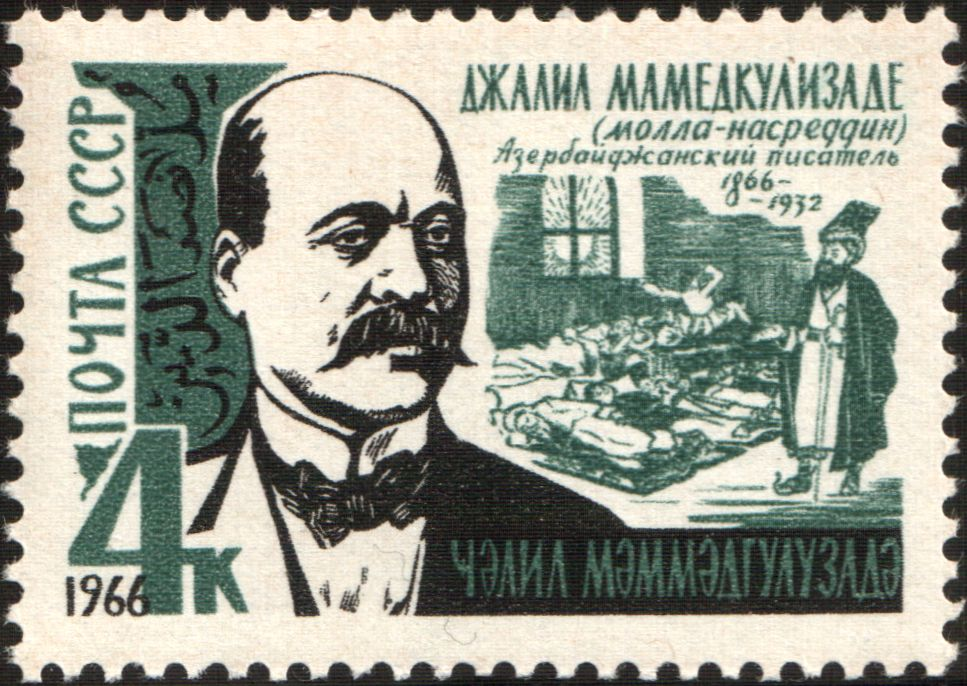
USSR postage stamp issued on the 100th anniversary of Jalil Mammadguluzadeh (1966).

The house-museum of Jalil Mammadguluzadeh was established on the order of the President of the Republic of Azerbaijan, Heydar Aliyev, on December 31, 1998. The inauguration of the museum took place on October 13, 1999.

== Exhibition ==
The museum displays exhibits reflecting the life and work of Jalil Mammadguluzadeh. The museum exhibits personal belongings of Jalil Mammadguluzadeh's family, including historical documents relating to the Nakhchivan contemporaries, writer's classic works and his personal library.

== Architectural features ==
The museum building is a historical and architectural monument of the 19th century. The building was built of raw bricks and later, baked with covered with baked bricks. Total of the building area and thickness of the walls are 100 m^{2} and 78 cm respectively. It consists of two floors. On the second floor there are 2 rooms, a vestibule and an open balcony. Entrance to the rooms and access to the balcony are from vestibule located in center. The first floor is located under the open balcony and consists of 2 rooms and a vestibule. It's possible to descend to the first floor and courtyard using brick stairs fixed to the balcony. On both floors, there are plenty of niches to put household items. The building was heated through the steam, which was placed on the wall of the room on the right side of the second floor.

== See also ==
- House-Museum of Jalil Mammadguluzadeh (Baku)
- House-Museum of Jalil Mammadguluzadeh (Tbilisi)
