= Lak-lak (magazine) =

Lak-lak Lək-lək South Azerbaijani: لک‌لک
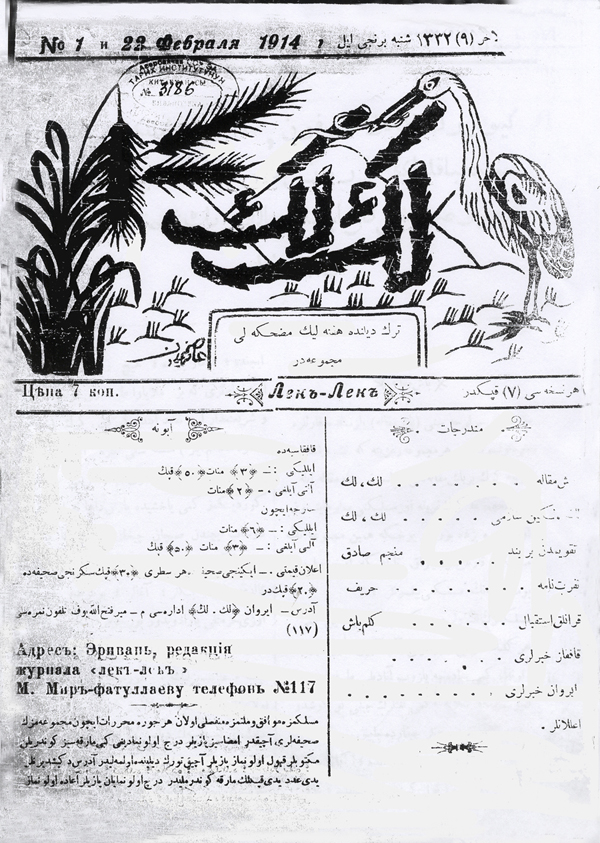
- The first issue of "Lak-lak" magazine dated February 22, 1914
- Frequency: weekly
- Founder: Mirza Jabbar Asgarzadeh
- First issue: March 7, 1914
- Final issue: June 30, 1914; 111 years ago
- Based in: Erivan
- Language: Azerbaijani

Lak-lak magazine (Azerbaijani: "Lək-lək" jurnalı, South Azerbaijani: لک‌لک) was the literary magazine published in 1914 in Yerevan.

== Biography ==
The first issue of Lak-lak magazine was published on February 22, 1914 in Yerevan. Lak-Lak magazine, which was published until June 30 of the same year, and only 12 issues were published, is a transliteration from the Arabic alphabet. The magazine continued the traditions of "Molla Nasraddin" literary school.

The publishers and editors of the magazine were Mir Mahammad Mir Fatullayev and Jabbar Asgarzade, and it was printed at the "Luys" printing house in Yerevan. There are notes of the author about the suspension of its publication. Lak-lak was the first press organ published in Turkish language in Armenia, a weekly humor magazine.

In 1913, in the censorship documents about the permission to publish "Lak-Lak" in the work-folder number 968 of the 1st list of 480 in the Central State Historical Archive of the Georgian SSR, the Iravan governor's certificate to publish Lak-Lak dated January 21, 1914 given to Mir Mahammad Mir Fatullayev and Jabbar Asgarzade, the magazine was allowed to print main articles, poetry, urban affairs, Caucasus news, telegrams, foreign and domestic news, column, representation, mailbox, announcements.

== Source ==
- Ziyəddin Məhərrəmov, "İrəvanda məktəbdarlıq və maarifçilik", Bakı, Nurlan, 2010.
- N.N.Zeynalov "Azərbaycan mətbuat tarixi", I hissə. Bakı, 1973, ADU-nun nəşriyyatı
- Gürcüstan SSR Mərkəzi Dövlət Tarix Arxivi, 480-ci fond, 1-ci siyahı, 968 nömrəli iş-qovluğu
