= Firidun bey Kocharli =

Azerbaijani writer and literatus

- Firidun bəy Köçərli
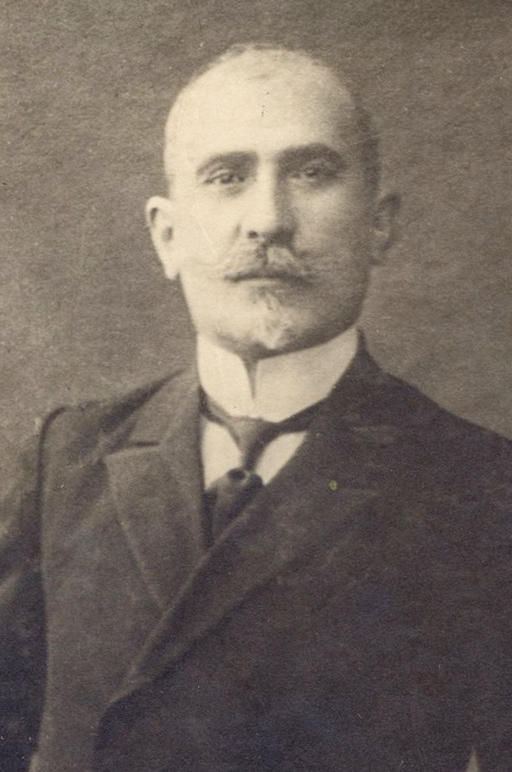
- Born: January 26, 1863; Shusha, Shusha uezd, Russian Empire
- Died: May 1920 (aged 57); Ganja, Elizavetpol uezd, Azerbaijan SSR
- Spouse: Badisaba Kocharli
- Writing career
- Language: az

Firidun bey Ahmad bey oglu Kocharli or Kocharlinski (Azerbaijani: Firidun bəy Köçərli; Russian: Фиридун-бек Кочарлинский or Кочарли) (26 January 1863, in Shusha – 1920, in Ganja) was a prominent Azerbaijani writer, philologist, and literary critic.

== Life ==
Kocharli was born in 1863 in Shusha being the only child of Ahmad bey Kocharli. Firidun graduated from the local Russian-Muslim school and was admitted to the Transcaucasian Teachers Seminary in Gori. Upon receiving his diploma in 1885, he started teaching Azerbaijani and religion at a Russian-Muslim school in Yerevan. In 1895 he was invited back to Gori to teach at his alma mater.

He was one of the first Azerbaijani literati to raise questions about standards for the written Azerbaijani language. In 1895 he wrote his first article Tatar Comedies ("Tatar" was a common Russian name for Azerbaijanis before 1920), followed by Essays on Our Literature (1904). In 1903 he published his first academic work entitled Literature of the Azerbaijani Tatars, a critical piece that contains information on 130 Azerbaijani writers and poets. In the following years he published some smaller works like Mirza Fatali Akhundov (1911) and Gift to Children (1912). Kocharli also translated works of European, mostly Russian authors into Azerbaijani. His major academic work is Topics on the History of Azerbaijani Literature, which was published only in 1925, five years following his death. It was one of the first successful attempts to compile scientific data on the history and development of Azerbaijani literature. Yusif Vazir Chamanzaminli, who greatly admired Kocharli, had published in Istanbul in 1921. A copy of this book is in the Azerbaijan Republic State History Archives in Baku.

In 1917–1918 he was member of the Azerbaijani National Council. In 1918–1920 Kocharli was elected to the parliament of the Azerbaijan Democratic Republic.

He was killed in Ganja in the spring of 1920.

He was married to Badisabah Kocharli, née Vakilova, a Gazakh-native teacher who later worked in Baku, Zagatala, and Shaki.

== Heritage ==
In the Soviet era, Kocharli's works remained largely unknown due to his political affiliation with the anti-Communist Musavat Party. It was not until 1957 when Bakir Nabiyev, a graduate student in the Azerbaijan State University, started researching the heritage of Kocharli accessing archives and interviewing some of his surviving colleagues and students. In 1960 Nabiyev published the first monograph dedicated to the contributions of Kocharli into scientific literature.
