= Ali Nazmi =

Ali Nazmi (Azerbaijani: Əli Nəzmi, pen name of Ali Mammadzadeh (Əli Məmmədzadə), 1878, Sarov–January 1, 1946, Baku) was an Azerbaijani poet, a representative of the 20th-century Azerbaijani realism and successor of Mirza Alakbar Sabir. Nazmi was the first translator of Shakespeare's King Lear into Azerbaijani.

Nazmi's first poem A Start to the Village was published in 1904. In 1926-1931 Nazmi was a secretary of Molla Nasraddin magazine. During the Soviet-German War he wrote several satires: Hitler's Union with Devil, Wolf's Protest Against God, My Homeland and others. Nazmi strived for the purity of Azerbaijani language against Pan-Turkists and Panislamists.

== Works ==
- Sijimqulunamə (Sijimguluname), Baku, 1927
- Seçilmiş əsərləri (Selected Works), Baku, 1959
- Şerlər (Poems), Baku, 1963
