= Aligulu Gamgusar =

Azerbaijani poet

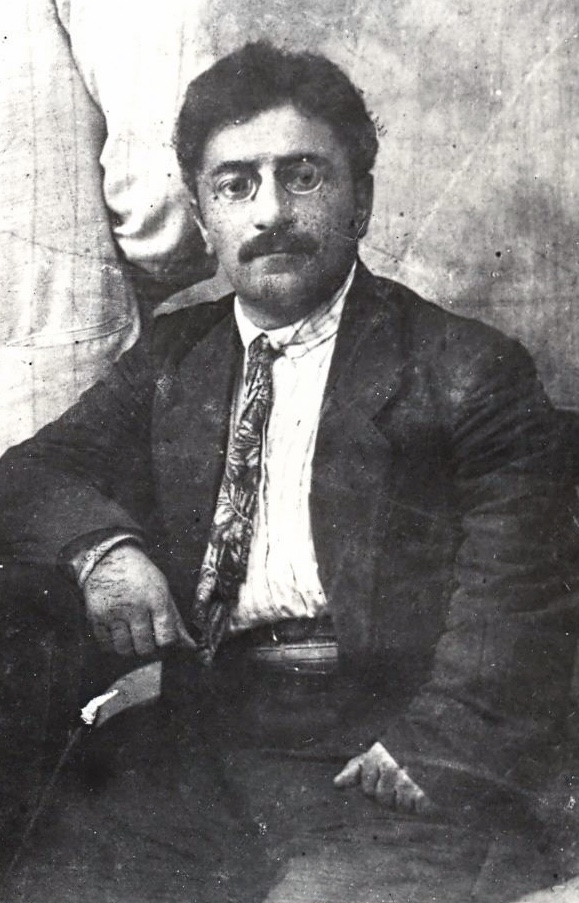
- Born: Aligulu Alekper oglu Najafov; 24 May 1889; Nakhichevan (Nakhchivan), Nakhichevan uezd, Erivan Governorate, Russian Empire
- Died: 14 March 1919 (aged 29); Tiflis, Georgian Democratic Republic
- Occupations: poet and journalist, publicist, writer

Aligulu Gamgusar or Aligulu Alekper oglu Najafov (Azerbaijani: Əliqulu Məşədi Ələkbər oğlu Nəcəfov; b. 24 May 1889, Nakhcivan, Russian Empire – d. Tiflis, Georgian Democratic Republic, 14 March 1919) was an Azerbaijani poet, journalist, publicist, public figure and writer. A prominent representative of the revolutionary-satirical direction of Azerbaijani literature.

== Life ==
Aligulu Gamgusar was born on 24 May 1880, in Nakhichivan. His maternal grandfather, Meshadi Asad, wrote poems under the pseudonym "Maddakh", his uncle is one of the famous writers of Nakhchivan named Mohammad Huseyin Najafov.

From the age of 8, Aligulu studied Arabic and Persian at the spiritual-religious school. Still studying at school, he began to write his first verses. In 1892, he entered a three-class Russian school. In 1896, due to his father's illness, his education was interrupted. He lived for some time in Tabriz and Khorasan, then he lived in Nakhichivan, Julfa. He wrote poems and articles in the magazine "Molla Nasreddin", in newspapers and magazines published in Baku, such as "Hayat" and "Irshad". In 1912, he moved to Tiflis and together with Mirza Jalil took part in the publication of the magazine "Molla Nasreddin". In 1916, the publication of the journal was temporarily suspended. Gamgusar and Mirza Jalil go on a trip, stage the comedy "The Deads" in Baku, Dagestan, Samarkand, Tashkent, in cities along the Volga. In this performance, Gamgusar masterfully played the role of Sheikh Nasrullah. Since 1917, Gamgusar's poems and feuilletons have been published in the Tiflis newspapers "Al Bayrag" and "Hyalyadzhyak". In his works, Gamgusar sharply criticized the bourgeois-landlord system, the colonial policy of tsarism, and fought against ignorance and religious fanaticism. The poet welcomed the national-liberation movement of the peoples of the Middle East – in the poem "England" the politics of the British colonialists are exposed.

On 14 March 1919, Gamgyusar was killed by the Mensheviks. He was buried in Azerbaijani Muslim cemetery in Tiflis.

== See also ==
- Jalil Mammadguluzadeh
