= Garayazi plain =

Plain in Qazax District of Azerbaijan

Garayazi plain Qarayazı düzü (Azerbaijani)
- Plain
- Coordinates: 41.378°N 45.333°E
- Location: Qazax District

Garayazi plain or Garayazi steppe is a plain located between the Gazangol plain and the Kura river in the Gazakh region of Azerbaijan.

== General Information ==
=== Toponymy ===
The name of the Garayazi plain is derived from the combination of the ancient Turkic word "Yazı" meaning "desert, wide plain" and the word "gara" from the modern Azerbaijani language meaning “black”. In the territory of Azerbaijan, toponyms with "Yazi" particles are more common. For example: Agyazi, Agcayazi and others.

=== Geography ===
Its area is 421 km^{2}, and it stretches to the territory of the Republic of Georgia in the west The Garayazi plain is wide (12–16 km) in the west, gradually narrows (1–2 km) in the east, and enters the wedge between the Kura River and the Ortagash-Quyrugenchi line.

The groundwater here is not very deep. It appears in the form of black water springs. These waters have a high flow rate and can be used in certain areas of the farm (agriculture, cattle breeding).

Mainly chestnut soils are dominated by developed dry steppe plants (cereals, various grasses and wormwood formations). On the banks of the Kura River, Tugay forests are spread over humid alluvial-tugay and alluvial-meadow soils with a width of 2-6 km. As a result of artificial irrigation, grain growing, cotton growing, and horticulture have developed widely in the Garayazi plain.

Within the Garayazi Plain, two distinct sub-districts are separated: Garayazi and Kursahili tugay forests sub-districts.

=== Climate ===
The climate of Garayazi plain is dry subtropical, characterized by hot summer and mild winter. The average annual temperature is 9–120 °C. The average annual precipitation is 350–400 mm, mainly falling in spring and autumn.

== See also ==
- Gusar plain
- Mughan plain
- Gara-Yaz State Reserve
