= Salahlı, Agstafa =

Salahly
- Azerbaijani: Salahlı
- Location within Azerbaijan
- Coordinates: 41°16′11″N 45°21′11″E
- Country: Azerbaijan
- District: Agstafa
- Time zone: UTC+4 (AZT)
  - Summer (DST): UTC+5 (AZT)

Salahlı (Salahly) is a village in the Agstafa District of Azerbaijan.
