= Jalil Mammadguluzadeh =

Azerbaijani satirist and writer

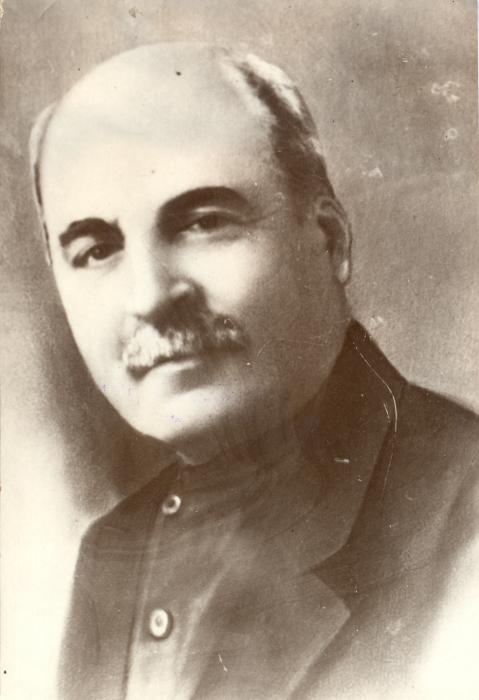
- Born: Jalil Huseyngulu oghlu Mammadguluzadeh; February 22, 1869; Nakhichevan (Nakhchivan), Nakhichevan uezd, Erivan Governorate, Russian Empire
- Died: January 4, 1932 (aged 62); Baku, Azerbaijan SSR, USSR
- Education: Transcaucasian Teachers Seminary, Gori
- Occupations: Teacher, journalist, writer
- Notable work: Molla Nasreddin (1906)
- Spouse(s): Nazli Kangarli (died 1903) Hamida Javanshir (m. 1907)

Jalil Huseyngulu oghlu Mammadguluzadeh (Azerbaijani: جلیل مَمَغُلوزاده, Cəlil Məmmədquluzadə; (Note: He is known in Persian as Jalil Mohammadqolizadeh (جلیل محمدقلی‌زاده; also romanized as Jalil Mohammad Qoli Zadeh).) 22 February 1869 – 4 January 1932) was an Azerbaijani satirist and writer. He was the founder of Molla Nasraddin, a satirical magazine that would greatly influence the genre in the Middle East and Central Asia.

Mammadguluzadeh is considered to be one of the first women's rights activists in Azerbaijan and Middle East and had a big role in founding the first women's magazine in Azerbaijan.

== Biography ==
=== Early life ===
Mammadguluzadeh was born in the territory of the modern-day Nakhchivan exclave of Azerbaijan. He first joined ecclesiastical school and went to Nakhchivan city school and learned Russian at the age of thirteen.

Mammadguluzadeh considered himself to be Iranian, and was proud of the fact that his ancestors hailed from Iran. In 1882 he joined the Gori Pedagogical Seminary in the Georgian city of Gori and it was here that he developed his worldview.

In 1887, he graduated from the Gori Pedagogical Seminary and for the next ten years was involved in teaching at rural schools in Bashnorashen (Sharur), Ulukhanli, Nehram and other towns and villages of the Erivan Governorate.

Mammadguluzadeh was a strong activist of the language unification. He condemned many of his contemporaries for what he considered a corruption of the Azerbaijani language by replacing its genuine vocabulary with newly introduced Russian, Persian and Ottoman Turkish loanwords, often alien and confusing to many readers. Later he became deeply involved in the process of Romanization of the Azerbaijani alphabet.

=== Career ===
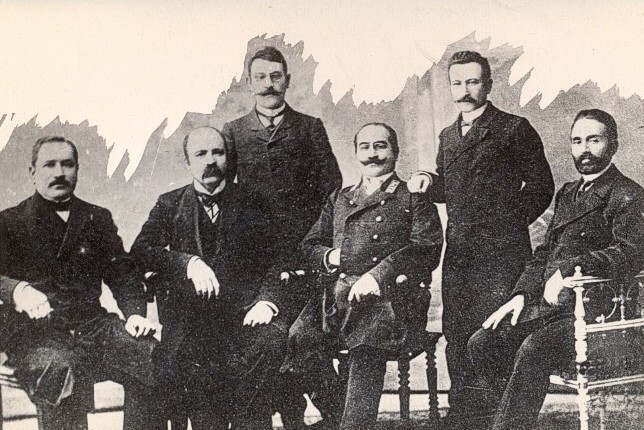
Azerbaijani writers, with Jalil Mammadguluzadeh positioned second from the left

After completing his education in 1887 he moved to the village in the Irevan province to be a teacher. In 1898, he moved to Erivan; in 1903, he moved to Tiflis where he became a columnist for the local Sharqi-Rus newspaper published in the Azerbaijani language where he published his first short story the Postbox after is read by the writer Muhammad agha Shakhtakhtinski he encouraged him to publish in Sharqi-Rus. In March of 1903, he met one of a close friend and colleague Omar Faig Nemanzade who also becomes a prominent journalist in his own right.

However, Sharqi-Rus didn't last long and only after publishing for two years in 1905 it was shut down. In March of 1905 after the closing of Sharqi-Rus and, he requested the government to published newspaper Novruz and were granted in summer of 1905 however he felt that he is limited in the range of content on the newspaper and relinquished the rights to Igbal newspaper owned by M.M. Vakilov.

In 1906, founded a satirical magazine entitled Molla Nasraddin. Frequent military conflicts and overall political instability in the Caucasus forced him to move to Tabriz, Persia, where he continued his career as a chief-editor and columnist for Molla Nasraddin. In the early days of the Magazine, It was banned in Iran and Turkey and in a satirical article in response to banned in issue of Molla Nasraddin no.36 6 December 1906 "We decided to increase our readership a little by distributing calendars and booklets; but that goddamn devil; everyday he comes to us and insists, for example, that we write that in Tabriz the successor to the throne assembles his 'humble' robbers and sends them to ransack Iran's villages and cities and distributes part of the booty between them, keeping the rest for himself." He eventually settled in Baku in 1921.

Mammadguluzadeh is considered to be one of the first feminists in Azerbaijan and Middle East and had a big role in founding the first women's magazine in Azerbaijan.

==== Molla Nasraddin ====
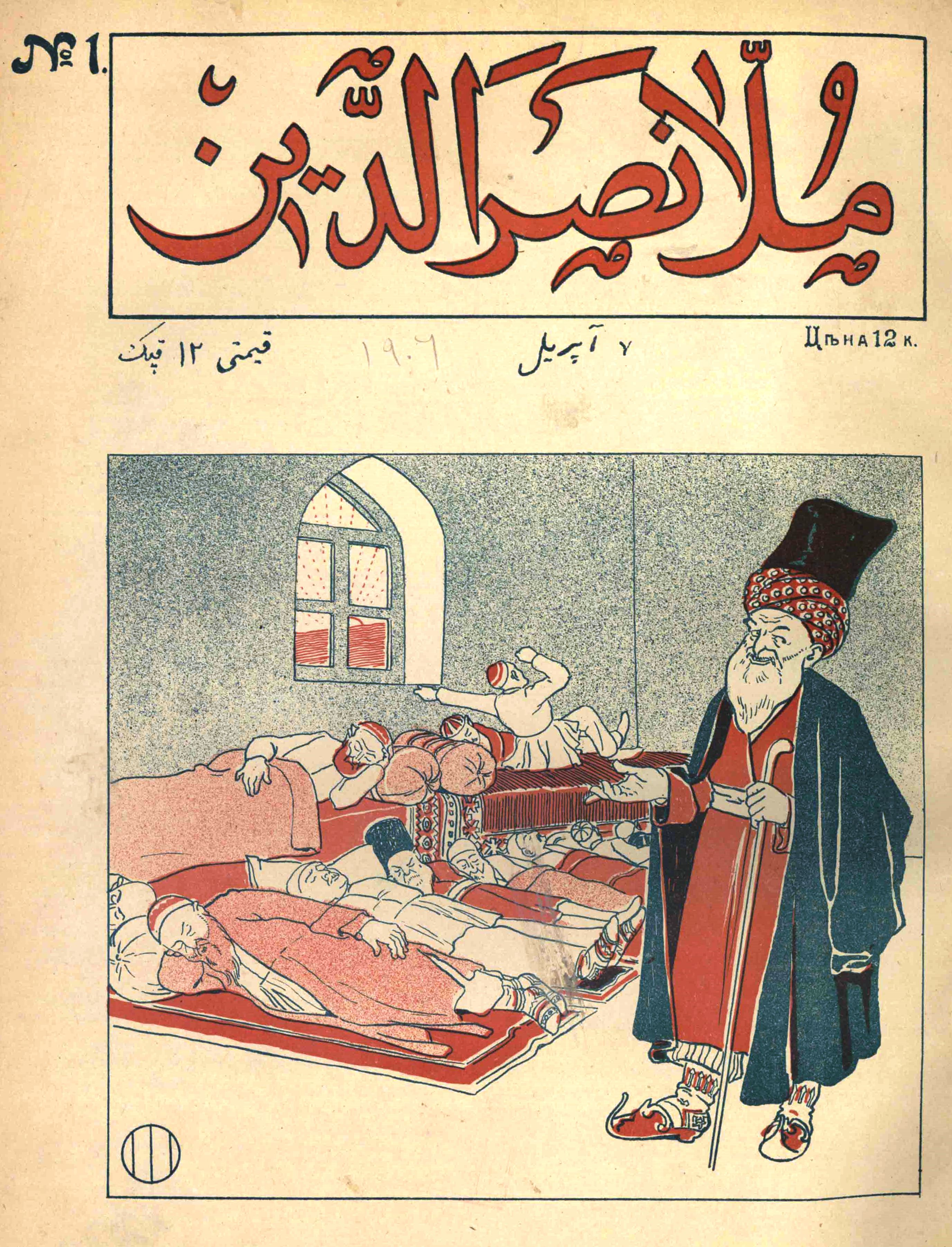
First issue of Molla Nasreddin, 1906

In 1905, Mammadguluzadeh and his companions purchased a printing-house in Tiflis, and in 1906 he became the editor of the new Molla Nasraddin illustrated satirical magazine. The Name Molla Nasraddin come to form the 13th-century Turkish cleric and a fool and name Nasruddin who stories often have a moral lesson. In Azerbaijani, the word Nasraddin it means "to tell it like it is" telling the reader that the magazine's ability is showing the political reality.

The magazine accurately portrayed the social and economic realities of the early-20th-century society and backward norms and practices common in the Caucasus. The Magazine uses illustrations, mainly by Josef Rotter and Oskar Schmerling, to reach the illiterate audience. Using stock character, simple illustrations, and symbolic language to attack the conservative religious mores and authoritarianism. In 1921 (after Molla Nasraddin was banned in Russia in 1917), Mammadguluzadeh published eight more issues of the magazine in Tabriz, Persia. After Sovietization, the printing-house was moved to Baku. Molla Nasreddin ceased publication in 1931 after Mammadguluzadeh's death. Mammadguluzadeh's satirical style influenced the development of this genre in the Middle East. Writers of the first satirical magazines in Uzbekistan and Turkmenistan were influenced by Jalil Mammadguluzadeh and Molla Nasraddin.

=== Personal life and death ===
In 1907, the twice-widowed Mammadguluzadeh married Azerbaijani philanthropist and feminist-activist Hamida Javanshir. He died in Baku in 1932, aged 65.

== Literature ==
Mammadguluzadeh wrote in various genres, including short stories, novels, essays, and dramatics. His first significant short story, "The Disappearance of the Donkey" (part of his Stories from the village of Danabash series), written in 1894 and published in 1934, touched upon social inequality. In his later works (The Postbox, The Iranian Constitution, Gurban Ali bey, The Lamb, etc.), as well as in his famous comedies The Corpses and The Madmen Gathering he ridiculed corruption, snobbery, ignorance, religious fanaticism, etc. He wrote the tragedy namely "Kamança" that was dedicated to Karabakh problem.

== Religious views ==
Mammadguluzadeh's religious views are disputed, and while some argue that he was an atheist, others view him as a modernist and an advocate for Islamic democracy. However, his criticism of the religious orthodoxy and religious conservatism made him a lot of the enemies in the religious conservative community. Azerbaijani philosopher Agalar Mammedov claimed that Jalil Mammadguluzadeh was atheist, however, no definitive evidence exists supporting the claim that Mammadguluzadeh was either an atheist, or a religious liberal or moderate.

== See also ==
- Aligulu Gamgusar
