= Molla Nasraddin (magazine) =

Azerbaijani satirical periodical

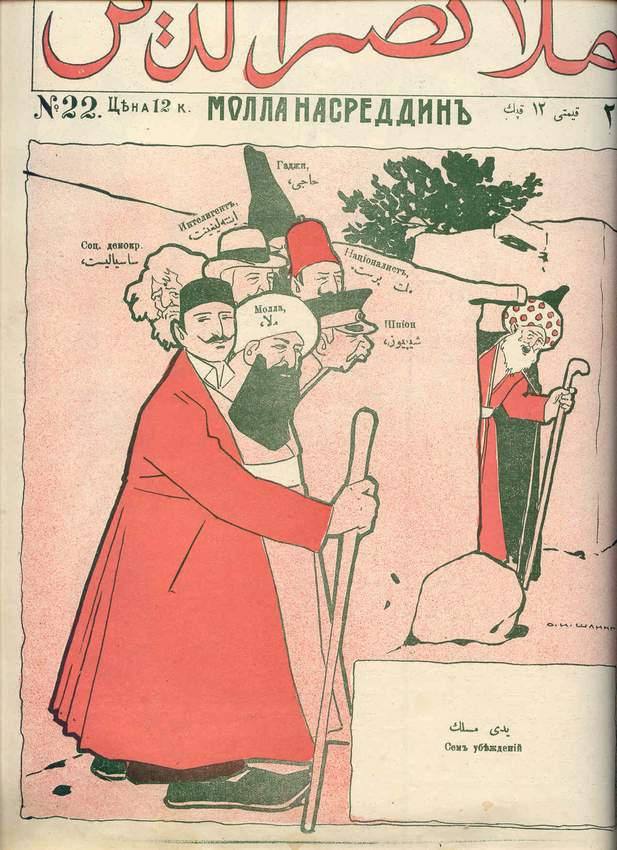
- Molla Nasraddin #22 (c. 1910)
- Editor-in-chief: Jalil Mammadguluzadeh (1906–1931); Mammadali Sidgi Safarov (1910–1911); Aligulu Gamkusar (1913–1914)
- Staff writers: Jalil Mammadguluzadeh; Omar Faig Nemanzadeh; Mirza Alakbar Sabir; Abdurrahim bey Hagverdiyev; Ali Nazmi; Aligulu Gamkusar; Mammed Said Ordubadi; Mirza Ali Mojuz; Artistic contributors: Oskar Schmerling; Josef Rotter; Azim Azimzade
- Categories: Satire
- Founder: Jalil Mammadguluzadeh, Omar Faig Nemanzadeh and Mashadi Alasgar Bashirzadeh
- Founded: 1906
- Final issue Number: 1933; 748
- Based in: Tbilisi, Russian Empire (1906–1917); Tabriz, Qajar Iran (1921); Baku, Azerbaijan SSR (1922–1931)
- Language: Azerbaijani

Molla Nasraddin (Azerbaijani: ملا نصرالدین, Molla Nəsrəddin; Russian: Молла Насреддин, old orthography: Молла Насреддинъ) was an eight-page Azerbaijani satirical periodical published in Tiflis (1906–17), Tabriz (in 1921) and Baku (1922–33). From the second issue of 1931, the magazine was called Allahsyz (Azerbaijani: Allahsız; Russian: Безбожник, lit. 'Godless') in the Azerbaijani and occasionally Russian languages. The magazine was "read across the Muslim world from Morocco to East Asia". It was founded by Jalil Mammadguluzadeh (1869–1932) and Omar Faig Nemanzadeh (1872–1937), and named after Nasreddin, the legendary Sufi wise man-cum-fool of the Middle Ages. Columnists wrote articles that "boldly satirized politics, religion, colonialism, Westernization, and modernization, education (or lack thereof), and the oppression of women".

== History ==
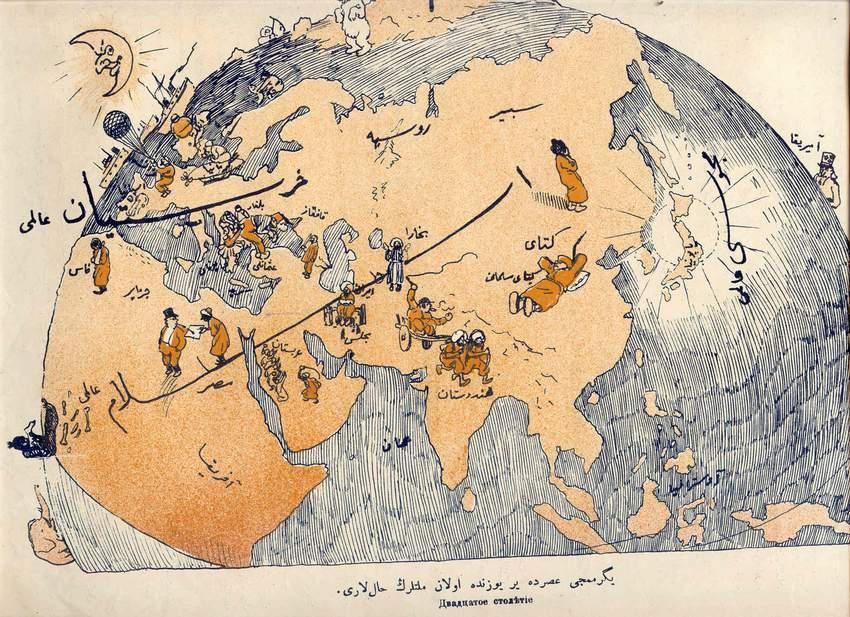
In a 1910 cartoon in Molla Nasraddin Europe and Japan are prosperous and developed while the rest of Asia, the Middle East and Africa are lands of slackers and oppressed lower classes. Caption: "The state of the continents in the twentieth century."

The periodical was founded by Jalil Mammadguluzadeh, a famous Azerbaijani writer, and Omar Faig Nemanzadeh, a prominent educator and publicist, published by Geyrat Publishing House owned by both. The name "Molla Nasraddin" was inspired by the 13th century Muslim cleric Nasreddin who was remembered for his funny stories and anecdotes. The main purpose of the magazine was to satirically depict various social phenomena, such as inequality, cultural assimilation, and corruption; and to ridicule backward lifestyles and values of the clergy and religious fanatics.

Bold and denunciative articles were the reason for numerous searches performed by the police and frequent bans of Molla Nasraddin (in 1912, 1914 and 1917). After a three-year break, Mammadguluzadeh moved to Tabriz, where within the next year he published eight more issues of the magazine.

The significance of Molla Nasraddin is in its development of the critical realist genre in Azerbaijani literature. It influenced similar processes in other literary traditions, primarily in Iran. Iranian cartoon art emerged as a result of publishing Molla Nasraddin in Tabriz in 1921.

== Editorial ==
Molla Nasreddin’s primary purpose was to attack the hypocrisy of the Muslim clergy using an acerbic sense of humor and realist illustrations reminiscent of a Caucasian Honoré Daumier or Toulouse-Lautrec. It also satirized the colonial policies of the US and European nations towards the rest of the world, the venal corruption of the local elite, and equal rights for women while arguing repeatedly for Westernization and educational reform. But publishing such stridently anti-clerical material in a Muslim country in the early 20th century was done at no small risk to the editorial team. Members were often harassed, their offices attacked, and on more than one occasion, Mammadguluzadeh had to escape from protesters incensed by the contents of the magazine.

An issue of Molla Nasraddin would often contain the following articles and columns:

- Anecdotes
- Cartoons, caricatures, and illustrations
- Discussions
- Facetiae (short witty pieces of writing)
- Feuilletons (journalistic and literary commentary)
- Humorous advertisements
- Humorous poems
- Humorous telegrams
- Personal advertisements
- Postbox
- Satirical stories

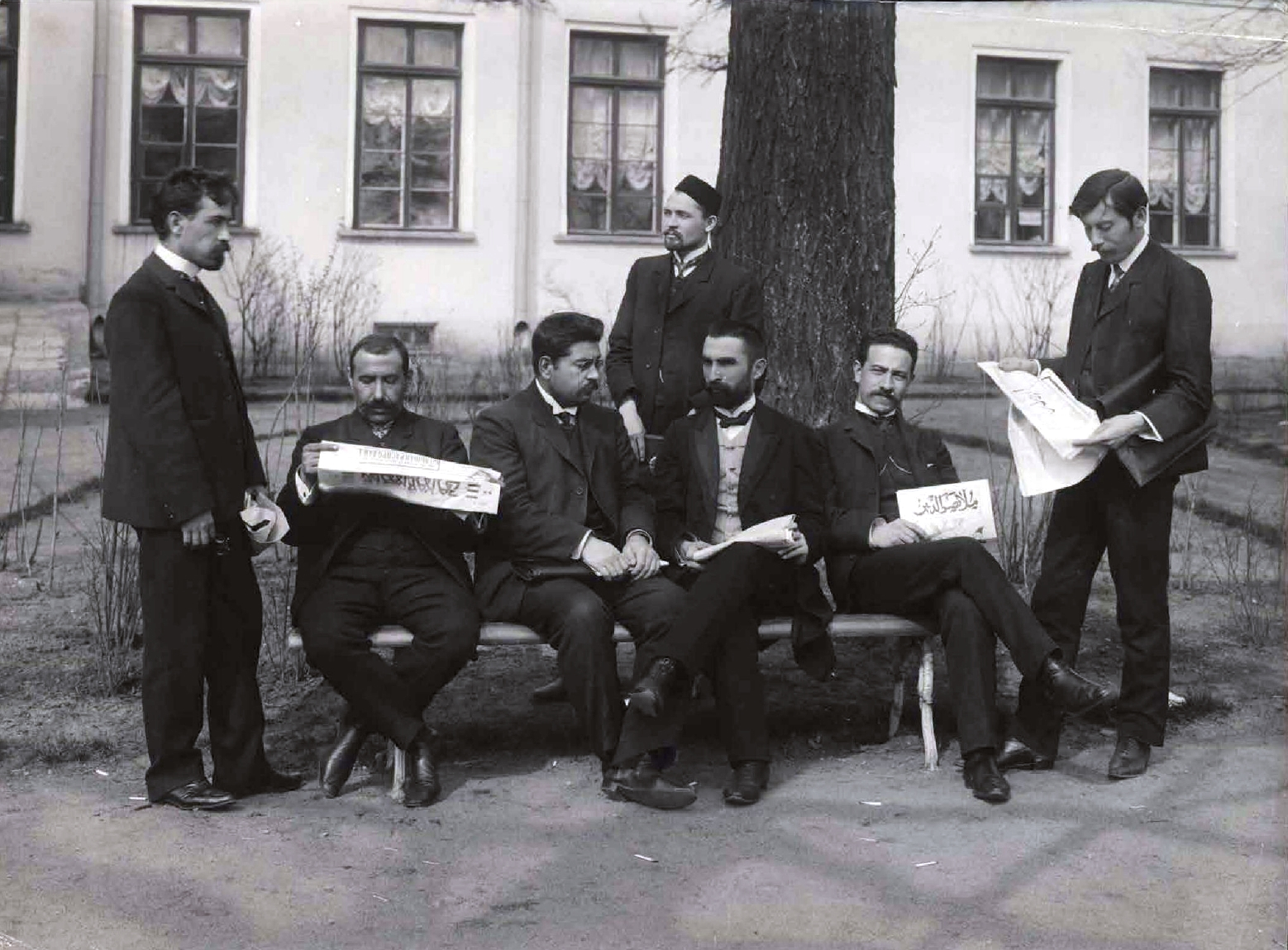
Russian Second Duma member Mustafa Mahmudov (second from right) displaying Molla Nasraddin

== Popularity ==
Managing to speak to the intelligentsia as well as the masses, the magazine was an instant success and was read across the Muslim world from Morocco to India. Roughly half of each eight-page issue featured illustrations, making the magazine accessible to the large numbers of people who were illiterate. Its written articles were polyphonic, self-contradictory, and staunchly in favor of the creolization that resulted from multiple languages (it drew on three alphabets), ideas, and identities (its editorial offices were itinerant between Tbilisi, Baku, and Tabriz).

== Fate ==
During Molla Nasreddin's two and a half decade run, the country at the heart of its polemics and caricatures – Azerbaijan – changed hands and names three or four times. By 1920, the Soviets had invaded Baku, affecting the quality of the magazine's editorial and art direction because it was forced to toe the Bolshevik party line. From 1922 to 1933, the magazine was a periodical of the Central and Baku Soviet of the League of Militant Atheists. Starting from the second issue of 1931, the magazine was renamed and until 1933 was published under the title Allahsyz (Azerbaijani: «Allahsız» or «Аллаhсыз» in Cyrillic; Russian: «Безбожник»; meaning "Godless").

Only three issues came out in 1933 and shortly afterwards the magazine closed down. Nevertheless, its legacy cannot be underestimated. Molla Nasreddin offered inspiration to similar pamphleteers from the Balkans to the Middle East. The Azeri newspaper Irshad coined the term "Molla Nasreddinism" to describe the ability to tell things as they are.

== See also ==
- Burhani-Hagigat
