= Schmerling =

Schmerling is a German surname. Notable people with the surname include:

- Anton von Schmerling (1805–1893), Austrian statesman
- Oskar Schmerling (1867–1938), German cartoonist
- Philippe-Charles Schmerling (1791–1836), Dutch/Belgian historian, paleontologist and geologist
- Rene Schmerling (1901–1967), Georgian art historian and art critic

== See also ==
- Anna Pessiak-Schmerling (1834–1896), Austrian composer
