= Josef Rotter =

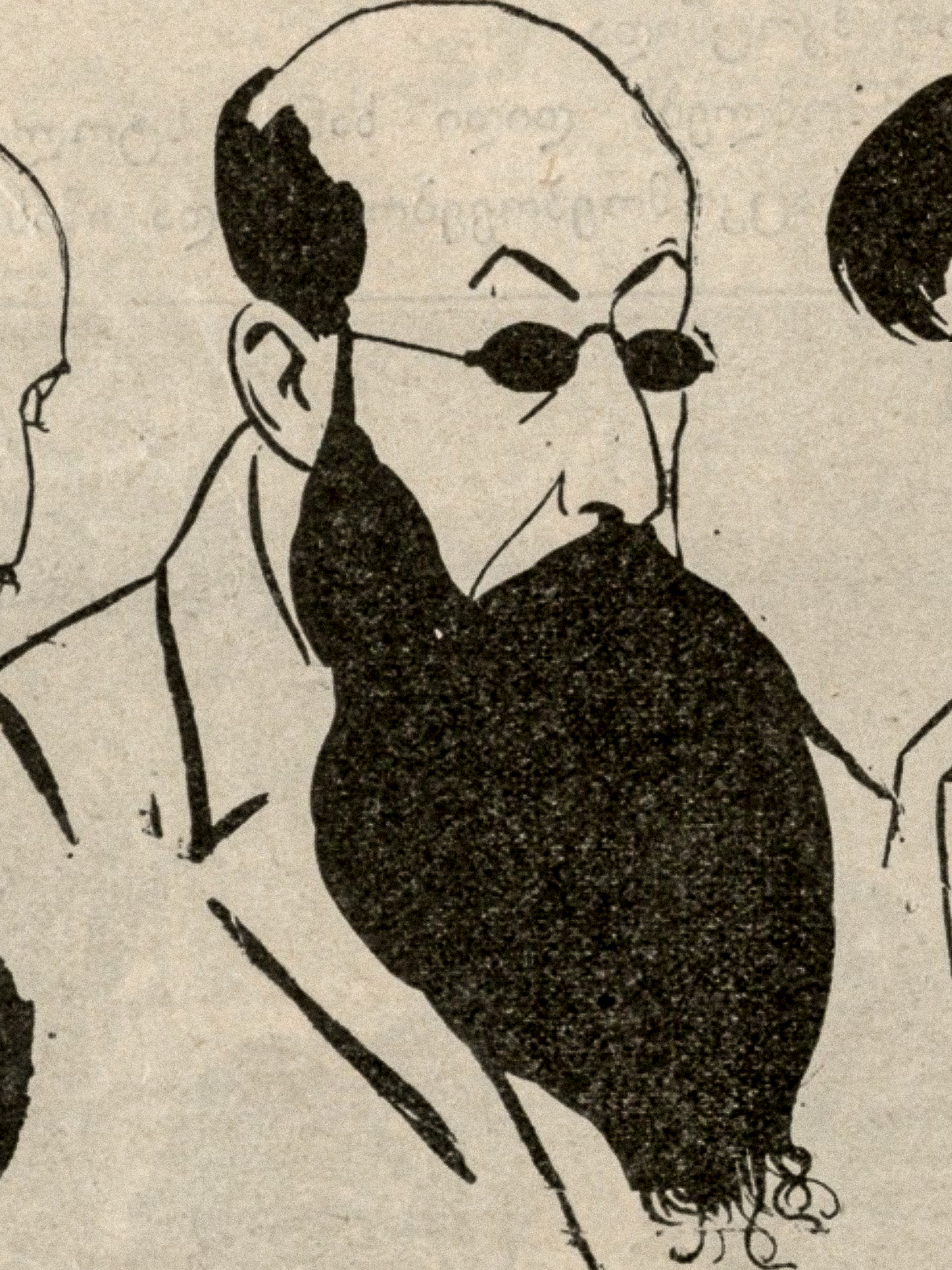
- Portrait of Josef Rotter by Oskar Schmerling, published in the illustrated supplement to Tsnobis Furtseli (April 6, 1903, no. 107)
- Born: 22 September 1867; Javorník, Austria-Hungary
- Died: 1 February 1937 (aged 69); Vienna, Austria
- Known for: Caricaturist, book illustrator

Josef Rotter (September 22, 1867–February 1, 1937) was a teacher, painter, illustrator, and editorial cartoonist of German or Austrian origin, most noted for his contribution to the Molla Nasreddin magazine.

== Origins and education ==
Rotter has been variously described as German, German-born, ethnic German, and Austrian, without German necessarily referring to the German Empire, and with the term Austrian applied to Rotter in a meticulous, largely ethnographic work by Karl August Fischer. The Jauernig region, where Rotter was born on September 22, 1867, was part of the Austro-Hungarian Monarchy until its 1918 dissolution, and then Czechoslovakia until 1938.

In 1885–6, Rotter enrolled at the Vienna Academy of Fine Arts, which recorded him as a native German speaker and Roman Catholic son of a stuccoist, studying painting under the supervision of Siegmund l'Allemand, August Eisenmenger, Christian Griepenkerl, and Franz Rumpler.

Rotter is said also to have studied at the Munich Academy of Fine Arts, but his name does not appear in the institution's 1809–1935 student matriculation books.

== Georgian Career ==
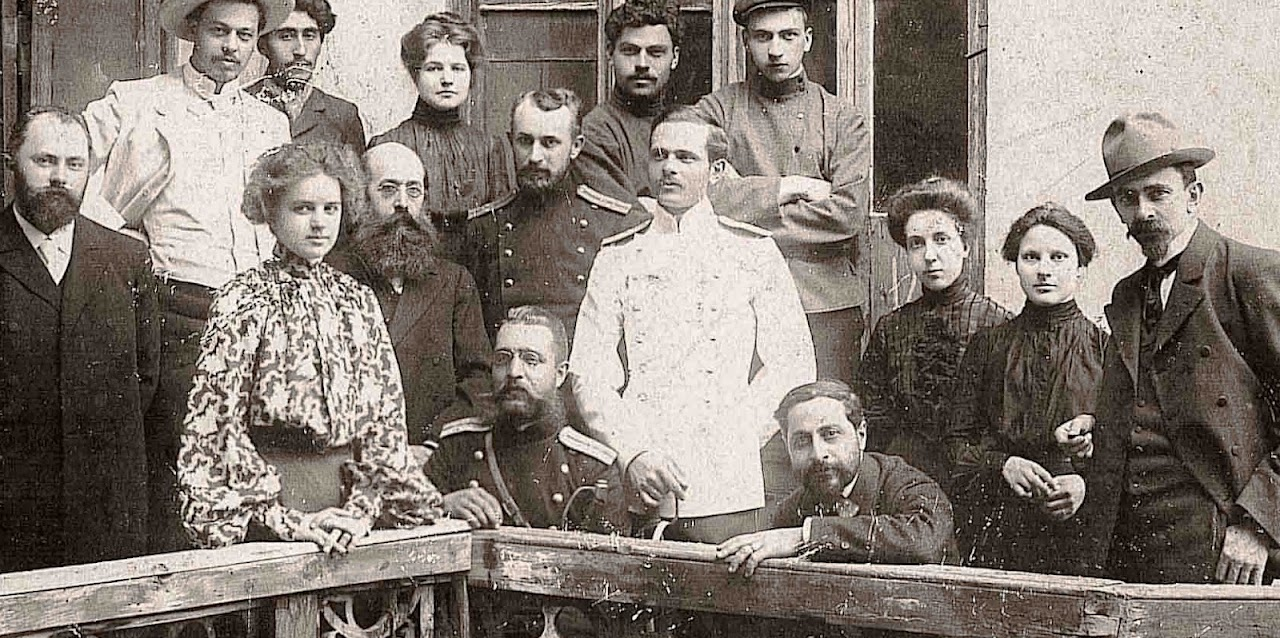
Josef Rotter, second row, second from the left, and Oskar Schmerling, first from the right, at a balcony of the Arshakuni House in Tbilisi

In 1902 Rotter accepted an invitation to teach at the newly founded Tiflis Secondary School of Painting and Sculpture, the direct precursor of the Tbilisi State Academy of Arts. The invitation was issued by Oskar Schmerling, a second generation Caucasian German artist and director of the school, with whom Rotter would remain in close contact for years—the two men not only teaching at the same institution, but also traveling together, and contributing to many of the same magazines.

From 1906 to 1914 Rotter engaged in intense activity, creating over twenty three hundred illustrations for twelve periodicals, all based in Tiflis but aiming at four linguistic groups over and beyond South Caucasia: the Armenian Hasker and Khatabala, the Azeri Molla Nasreddin, the Georgian Ek'ali, Eshmak'is matrakhi, Nak'aduli, Nishaduri, Shroma, Shuamavali, Tsetskhli, Tsnobis purtseli, and the German Kaukasische Post. Ten of these publications were launched in the wake of the 1905 Russian Revolution, all took advantage of the subsequent relaxation of censorship, and seven were satirical magazines with pioneering content.

Over eleven hundred of Rotter’s illustrations were published in Molla Nasreddin. Each issue of this weekly magazine, whose publication experienced multiple interruptions, had a close to eight-page editorial content, including four pages devoted to social or political cartoons. About a third of these fully illustrated pages in 1906–7, half in 1908–9, three-quarters in 1910–13, nine-tenths in 1914, and three-fifths over the entire 1906–14 period, were filled with Rotter’s work. So Rotter’s role is seen as important in quantitative terms. Cartoons were meant to widen the audience of Molla Nasreddin, include the less educated, and cross linguistic barriers; and indeed, the magazine enjoyed a large circulation, with numerous schools and coffeehouses among its subscribers, and a geographic reach suggesting a far from exclusively Azeri readership. So Rotter’s role is seen as important from a qualitative point of view and in tandem with Schmerling, the publication’s other prominent illustrator. Finally, to assess Rotter's impact in synergy with all of Molla Nasreddin's collaborators, one may refer to Alexandre Bennigsen's description of the magazine as an effective proponent of progressive ideas in the Muslim world, a model for the Armenian, Azeri, Georgian, Iranian, and Tatar press, and a significant force in the Persian Constitutional Revolution.

In the same period, Rotter created illustrations for Abbas Ghayebzadeh's Azeri translation of Ferdowsi's Rostam and Sohrab.

== Austrian Career ==
Rotter’s collaboration with Tiflis-based periodicals came to a sudden end in the summer of 1914, shortly before the onset of World War I. His whereabouts during the next three to four years are unknown, but he is found as having resumed his artistic career shortly after the war, this time in Austria. Tens of Rotter's illustrations were published in Vienna from 1919 onward, in a series of books including James Fenimore Cooper's tale of The Red Rover, two narratives of Dietrich von Berne’s exploits, and a selection of Friedrich von Schiller's poems. Under the impulsion of Rudolf Hans Dietrich, Rotter was commissioned in the mid to late 1920s by Viennese clients to produce large paintings representing fictional groups of the city's past or present figures of performing arts. Commissions of this kind comprised a set of murals in Etablissement Diglas, another set in the Zur goldenen Glocke guest garden, and a commemorative aquarelle of a ball of the Society for the Promotion of Viennese Folk Arts. Finally, hundreds of drawings prepared by Rotter for J. Steinbrener's widely distributed almanacs were sent in the 1930s from Vienna to the publisher's Bohemian headquarters in Vimperk.

The last and somewhat atypical indication of Rotter's activity, from both a chronological and geographical point of view, is a 1939 publication of some of his work in Yerevan, as an album dealing with Armenian legends.

Rotter died on February 1, 1937 in the Barmherzige Brüder hospital of Vienna.

== Gallery ==
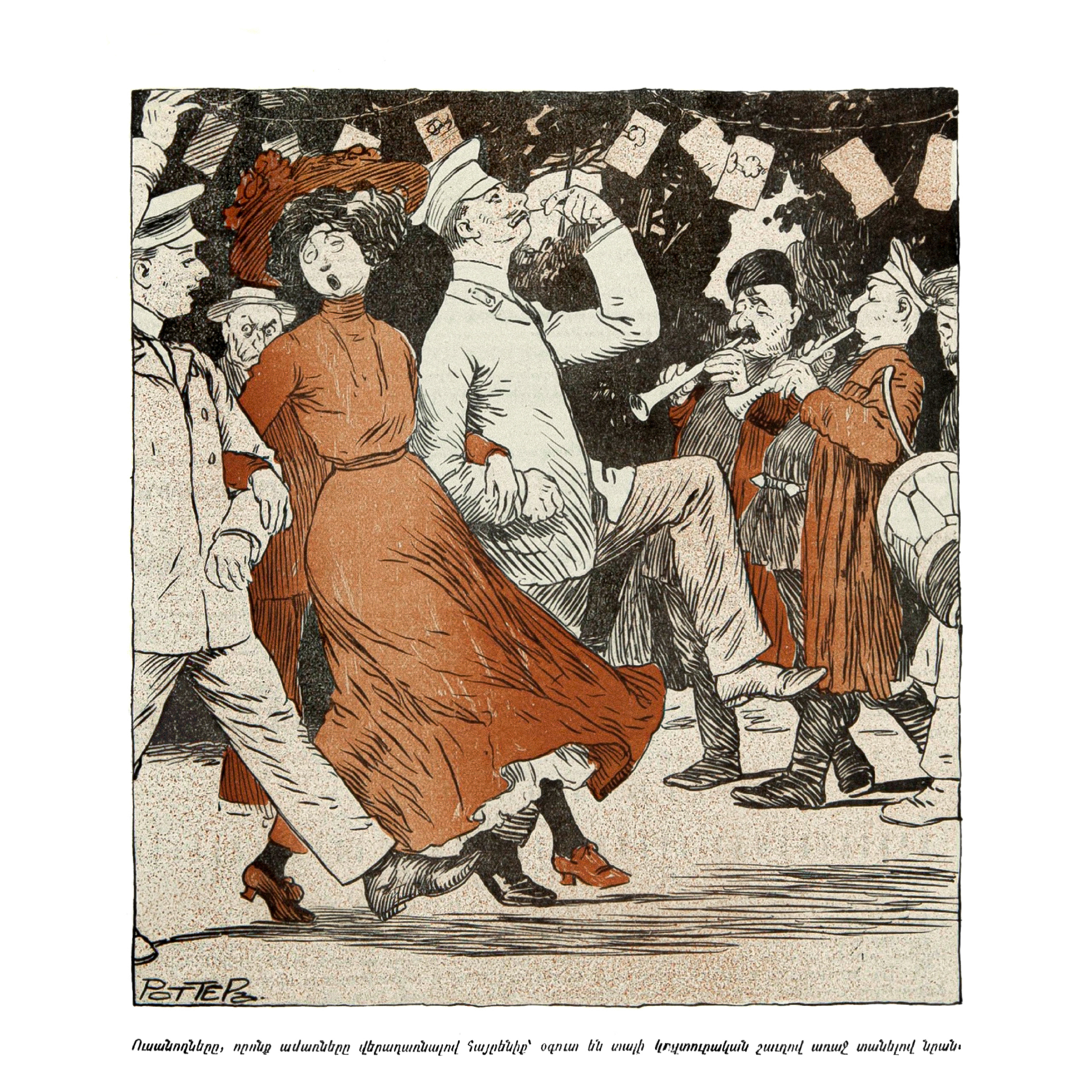
Khatabala, Oct. 8, 1911, no. 41, p. 489

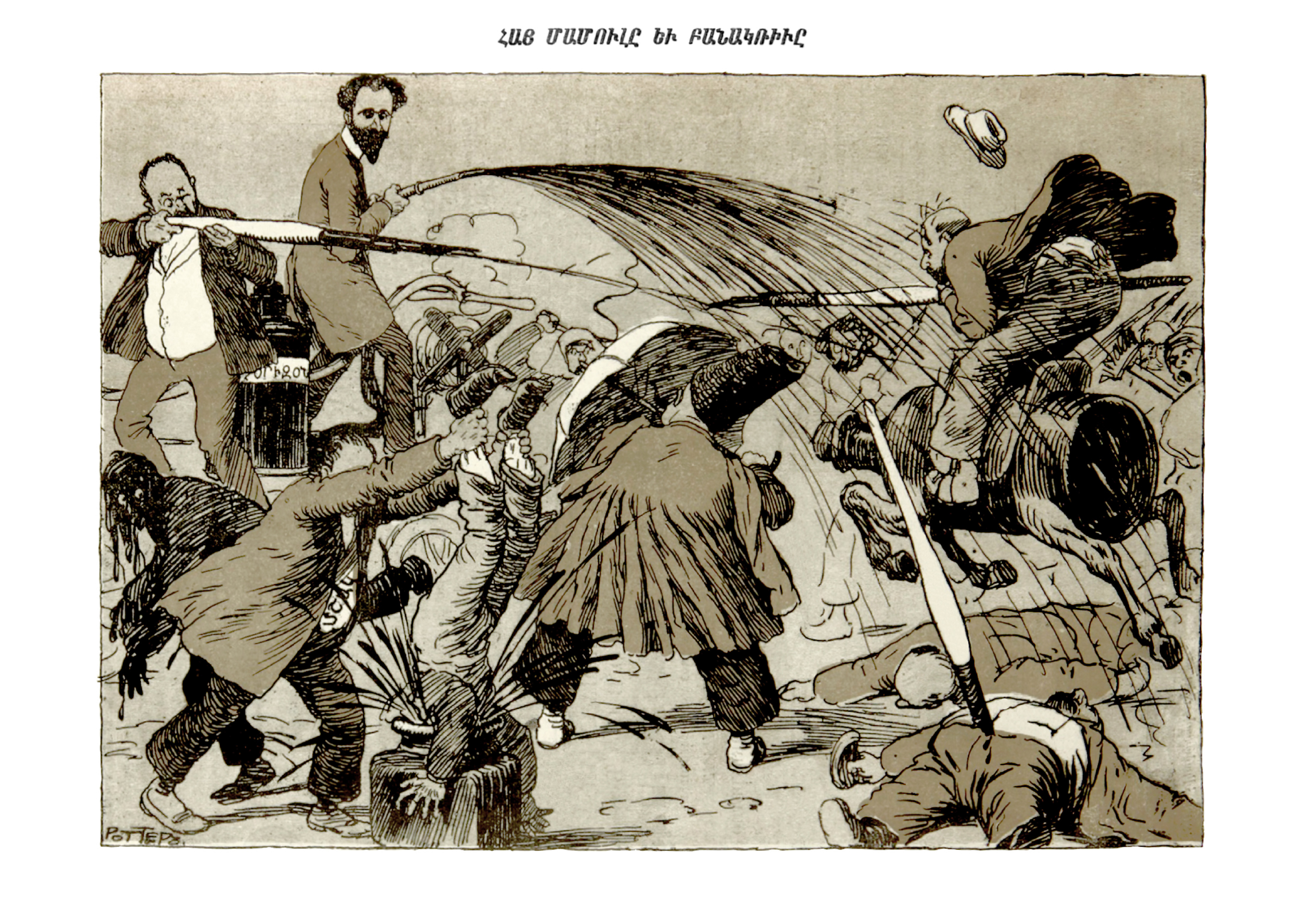
Khatabala, Dec. 3, 1911, no. 49, p. 588

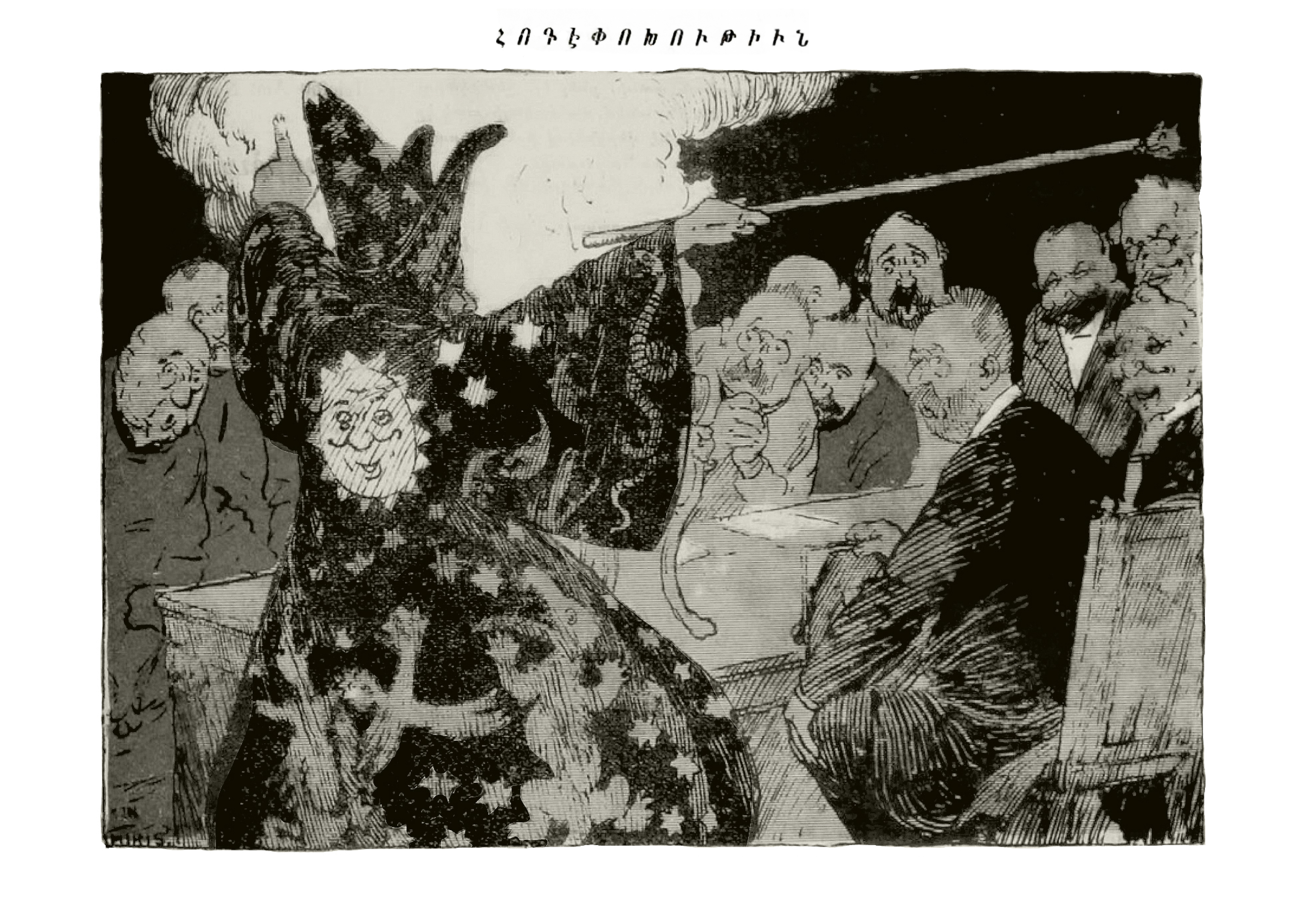
Khatabala, June 2, 1912, no. 21, p. 249

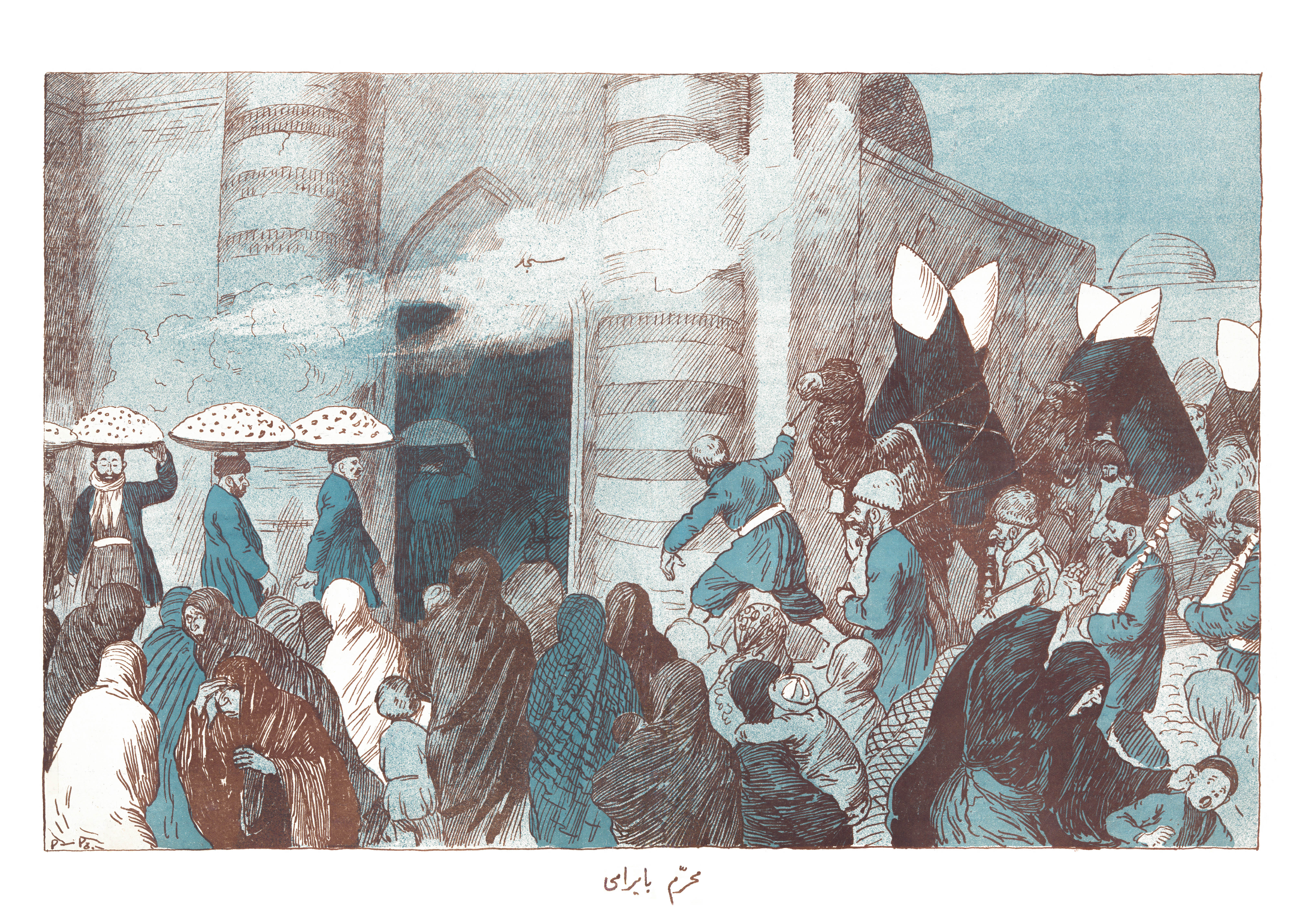
Molla Nasreddin, Jan. 10, 1910, no. 2, pp. 4–5

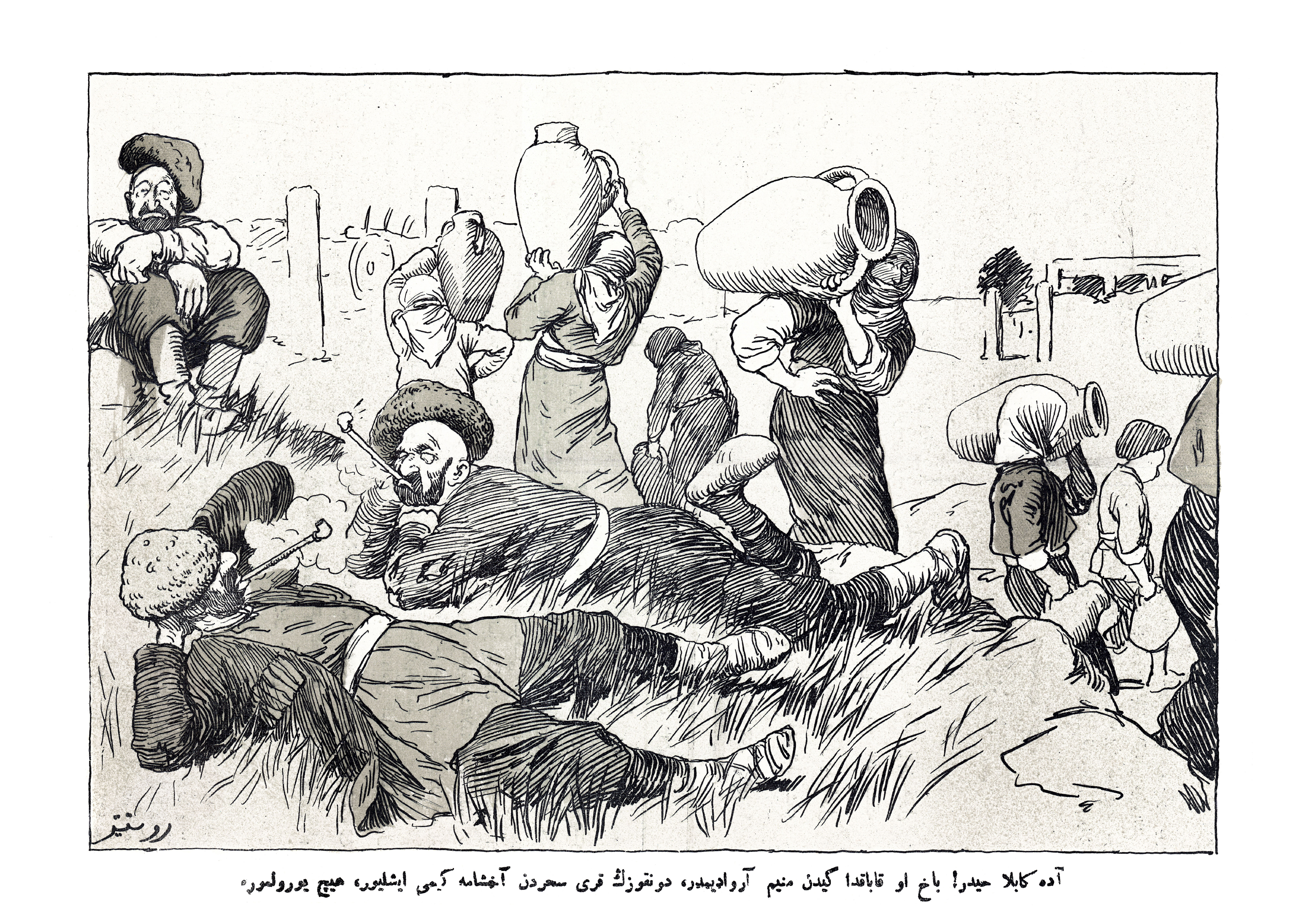
Molla Nasreddin, Nov. 13, 1910, no. 36, p. 8

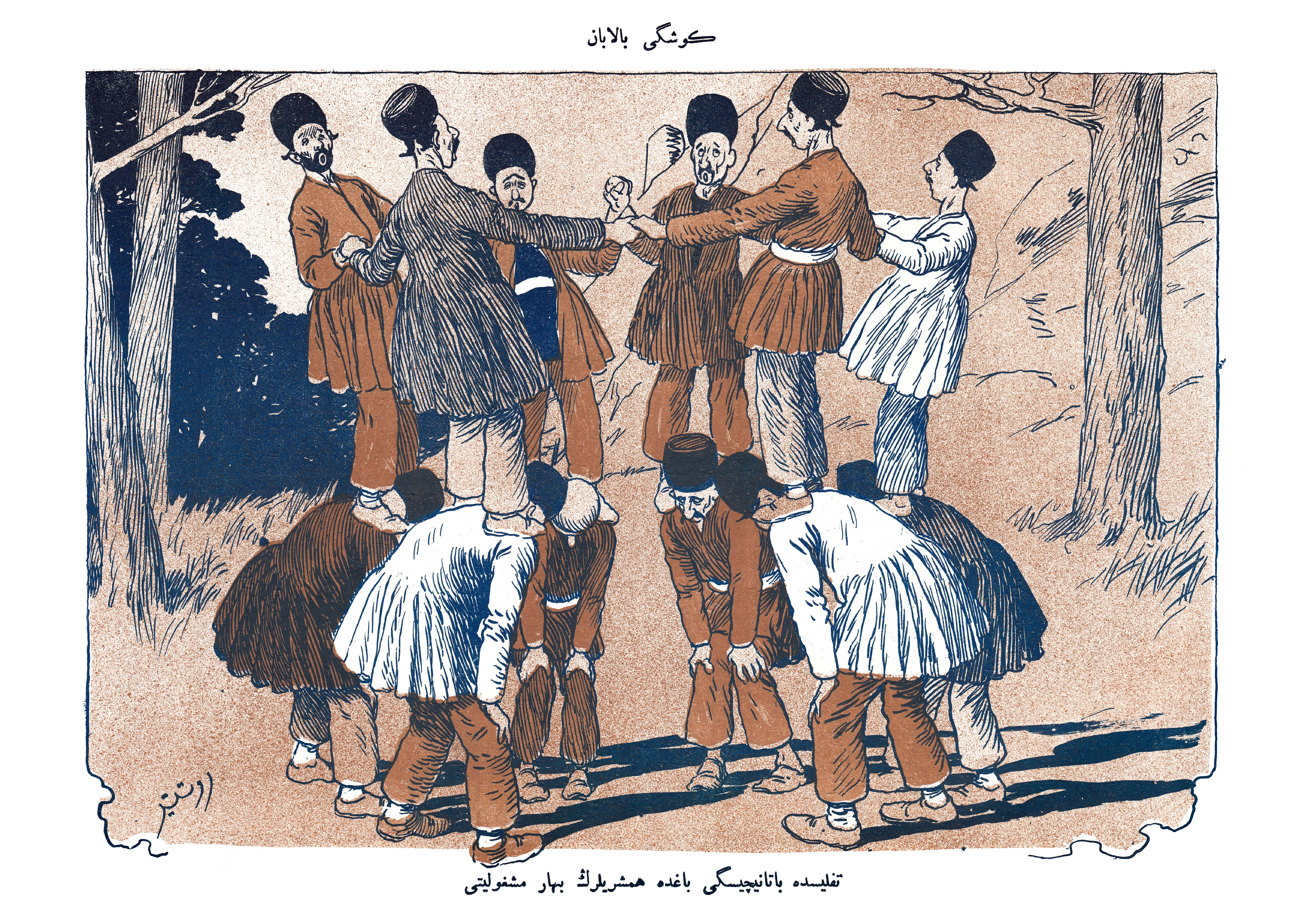
Molla Nasreddin, May 15, 1911, no. 18, p. 5
