= Khatabala =

Historic Armenian periodical

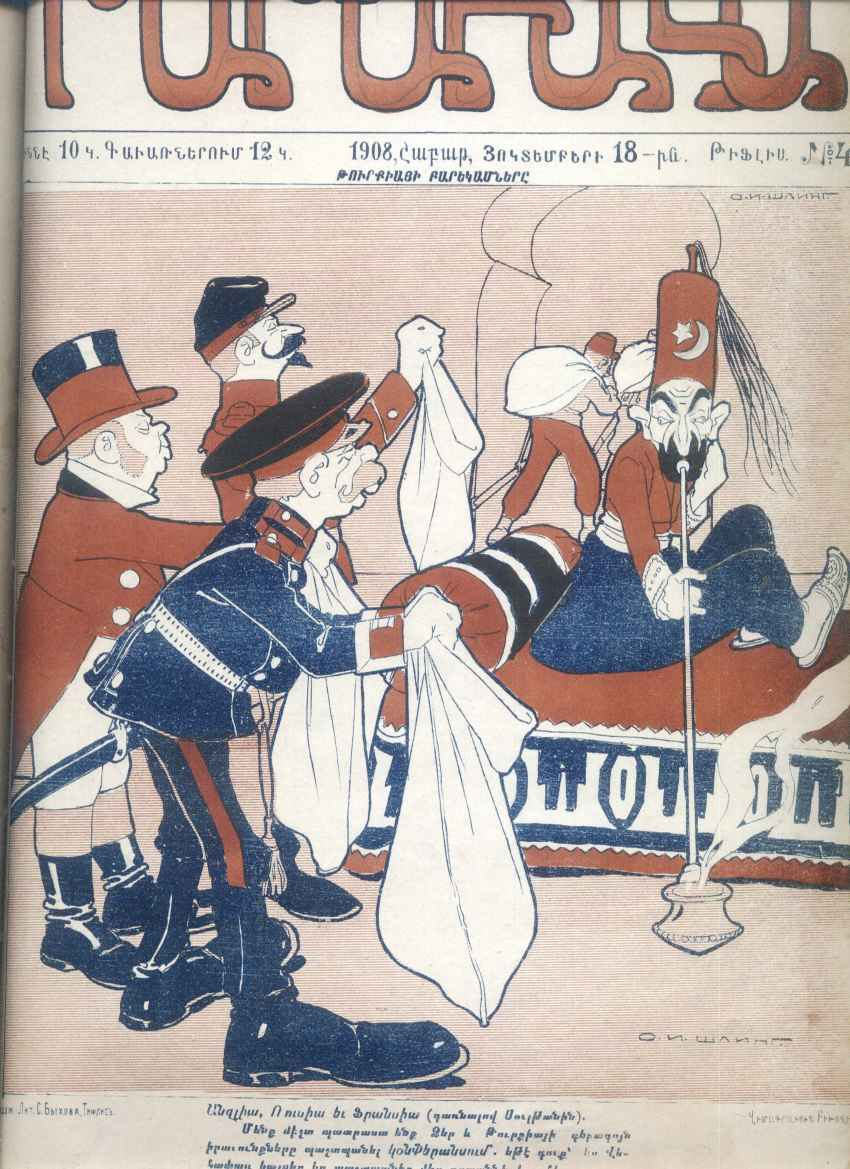
- Khatabala #43 (c. 1908)
- Editor-in-chief: Astvatsatur Yeritsyan
- Staff writers: Astvatsatur Yeritsyan; Ashot Atanasyan; Atrpet; Tmblachi Khachan; Hovhannes Tumanyan; Avetik Isahakyan; Movses Arazi; Stepan Zoryan; Artistic contributors: Oskar Schmerling; Josef Rotter; Henryk Hryniewski; Gevorg Bashinjaghian
- Categories: Satire
- Founder: Astvatsatur Yeritsyan
- Founded: 1906
- Final issue: 1926
- Based in: Tiflis (Tbilisi)
- Language: Armenian; Russian; Georgian

Khatabala (Armenian: Խաթաբալա; Russian: Хатабала) was a twelve-page Armenian satirical periodical published in Tiflis (Tbilisi) from 1906 to 1916 and again in 1922 and 1925–26 in the Armenian and occasionally Russian and Georgian languages. It was founded by Astvatsatur Yeritsyan (1872–1929), who edited the periodical along with Ashot Atanasyan (1870–1941). The name of Khatabala comes from a popular word used by Armenians, Georgians, Azerbaijanis and Persians meaning misfortune, setback, or troubles, ultimately derived from the Arabic words ḵaṭā 'error' and balāʾ 'trouble, tribulation'.

== History ==
Astvatsatur (Bagrat) Yeritsyan was a publicist and satirist. He was originally from Tsgnet (Tskneti in Georgian). He received his primary education at the Nersisian School in Tiflis, then studied at the St. Petersburg Conservatory, but dropped out and returned to Tiflis. Here, in 1906, he firstly published the Russian-language magazines Zhgut (only one issue was published) and Svistok (only two issues were published), and later, in the company of a prominent democrat and publicist Ashot Atanasyan, he founded the satirical periodical Khatabala. In 1909–1912 Astvatsatur Yeritsyan also edited and published the literary, political and commercial daily Surhandak.

The main purpose of the magazine was to satirically depict various social phenomena, such as inequality, cultural assimilation and corruption, and to ridicule backward lifestyles and values of the clergy and bureaucrats. Khatabala harshly condemned the anti-Armenian policy of the Ottoman Empire and championed the friendship of the peoples of Transcaucasia. It contained frequent responses to international events, and traced the liberation struggle of the peoples of the Balkans and the East. Its repeated solidarity with Azerbaijani satirical magazine Molla Nasraddin gained widespread attention. It is a visually stunning and extremely rich source on the life of Armenians in early twentieth-century Tiflis, Constantinople, and beyond, and an important response to the repressive anti-Armenian policies of the Ottoman Empire and, in later years, the Armenian genocide. During the First World War, it was published in the Armenian and Russian languages and was closed in 1916.

It was revived twice during the Soviet era. Only one issue was published in 1922, and a total of 7 issues were published in 1925–1926. Khatabala differed from Karmir Motsak (another Armenian satirical periodical published in Tiflis) in its breadth of coverage of reality, the richness of factual material, and the color of artistic creativity. The publication affirmed the socialist doctrine while also criticising the undesirable features of reality and pitting two socialist and capitalist moral worlds against one another. However, the number of issues in these publications was drastically reduced, and the humor's tone and storyline changed. Khatabala also stopped publishing along with such satirical periodicals Shesht, Zurna, Karmir Motsak as a result of censorship. In the last years of its publication, it was published in the Armenian, Georgian and Russian languages.

== Contributors ==
Among its contributors were Gevorg Bashinjaghian, Henryk Hryniewsky, Garegin Yeritsyan, A. Mirzoyan, Josef Rotter, Atrpet, Musheg Bagratuni, Tmblachi Khachan, Garegin Levonyan, Hovhannes Tumanyan (1869–1923, considered the Armenian national poet), Avetik Isahakyan (1875–1957, a well-known Armenian poet), Movses Arazi, Stepan Zoryan. A number of the illustrations were also painted by Oskar Schmerling (1876–1938), the Georgian painter and graphic artist of German origin, who taught Lado Gudiashvili and other leading modernist artists.

== Gallery ==
Cover pages

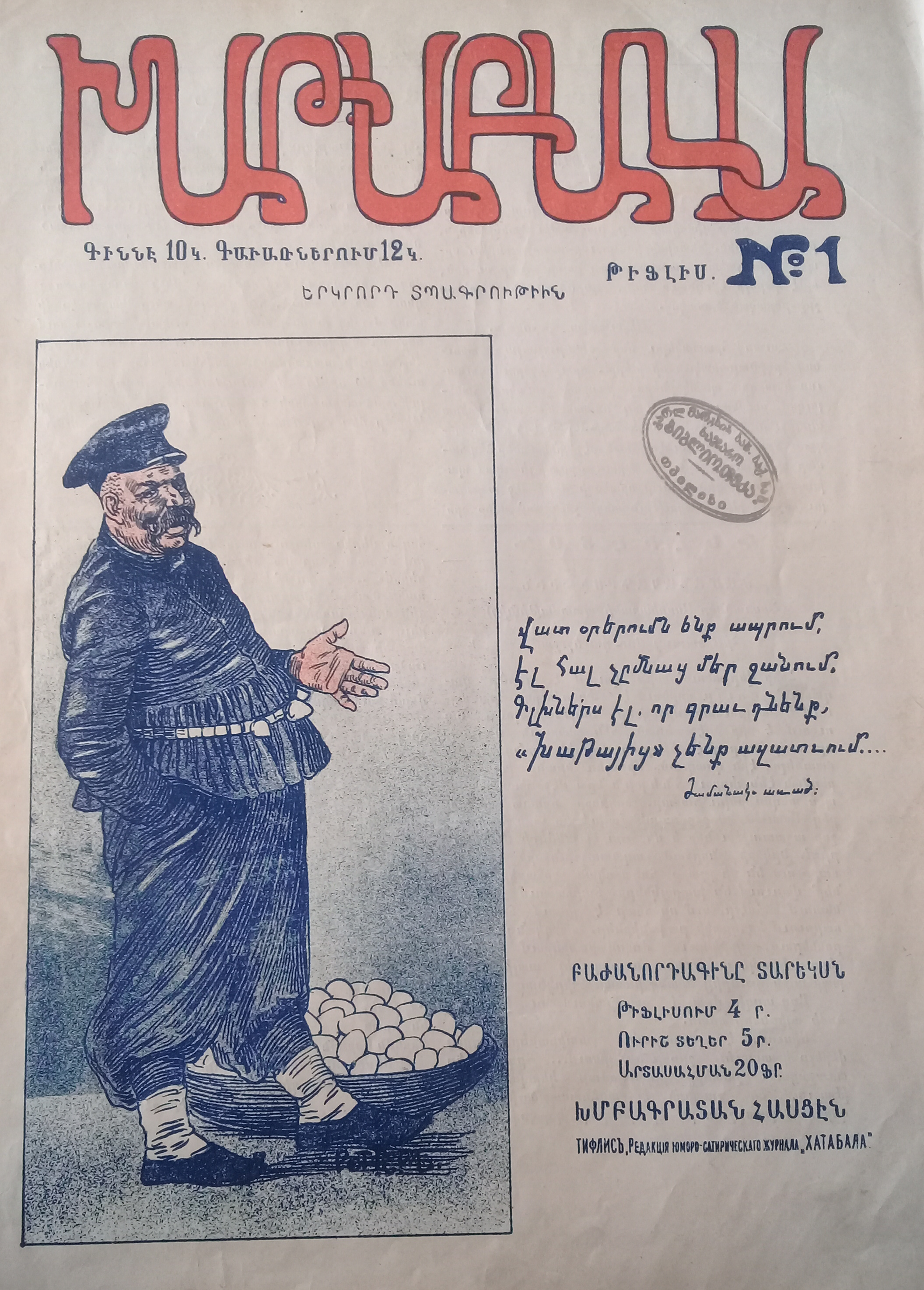
Cover of the first issue from 1906

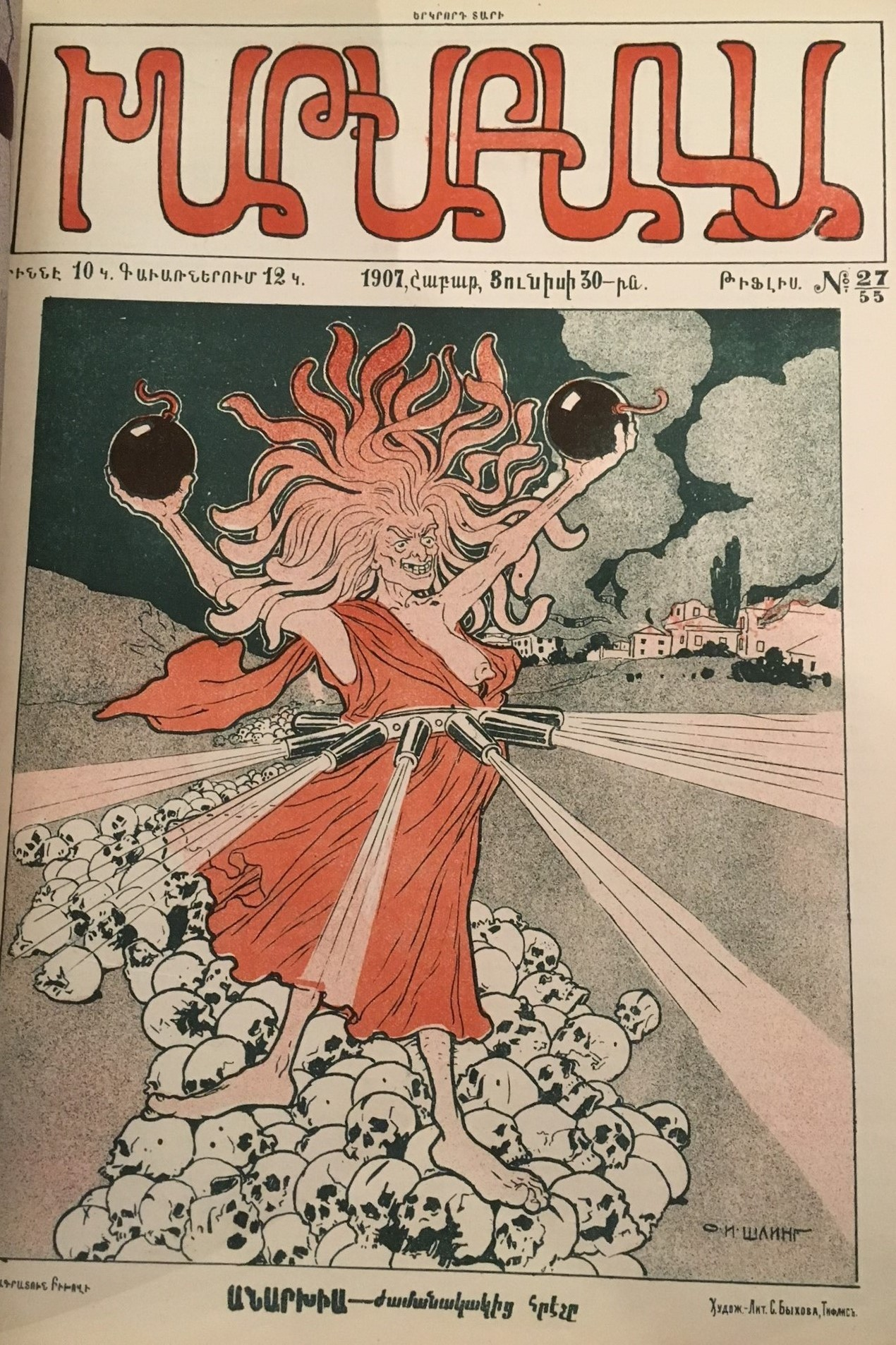
Cover from 1907

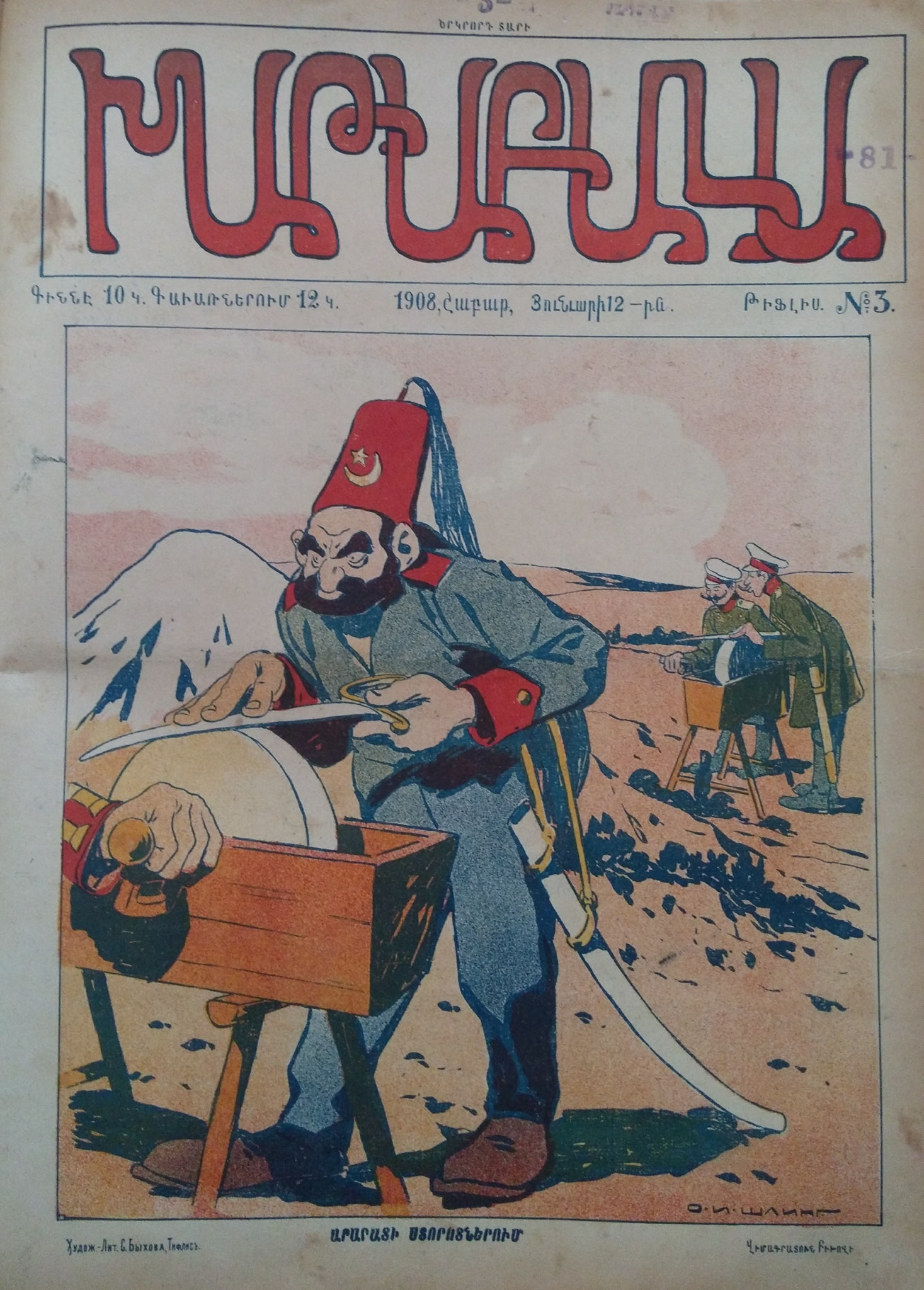
Cover from 1908

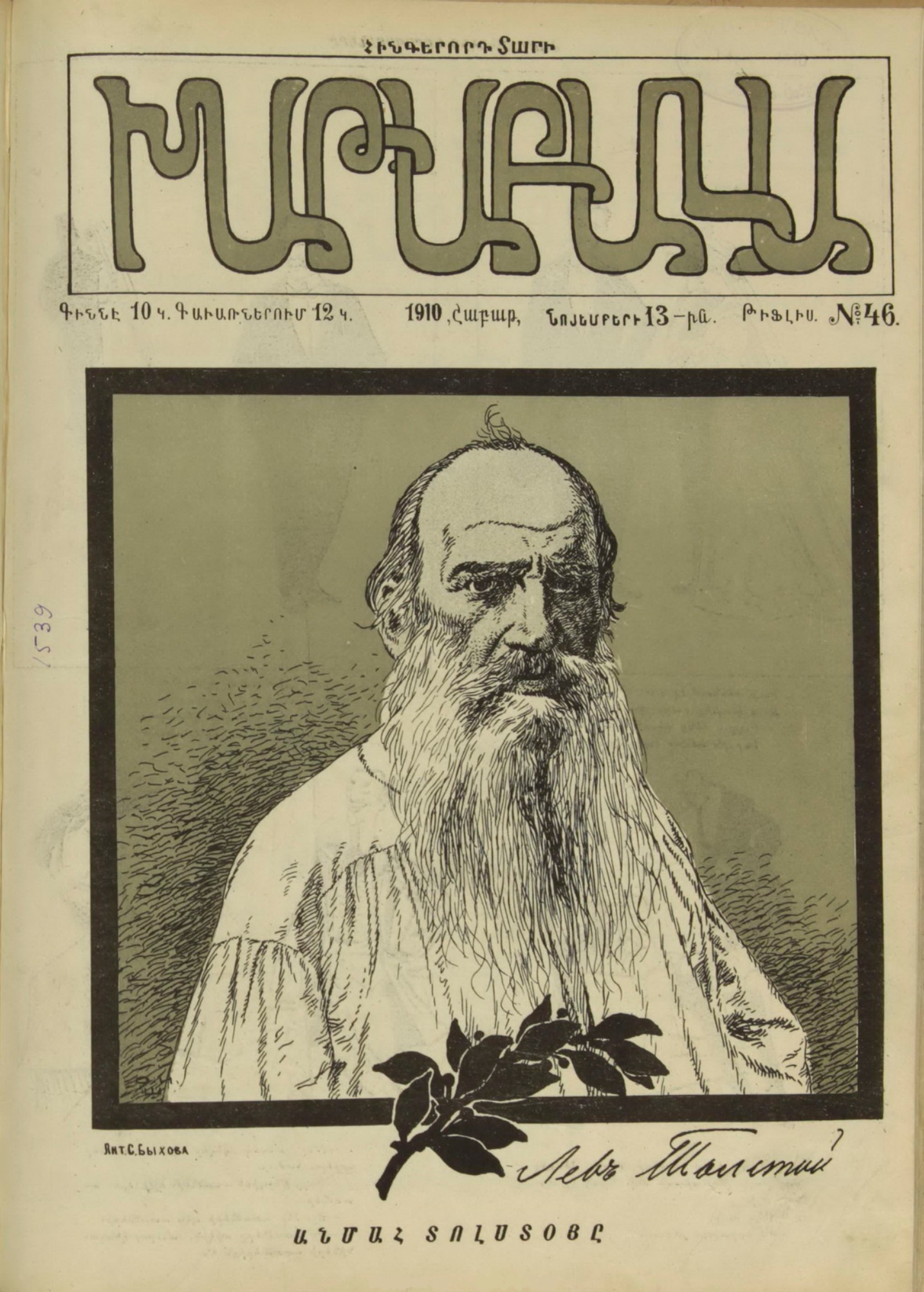
Cover from 1910
Internal affairs

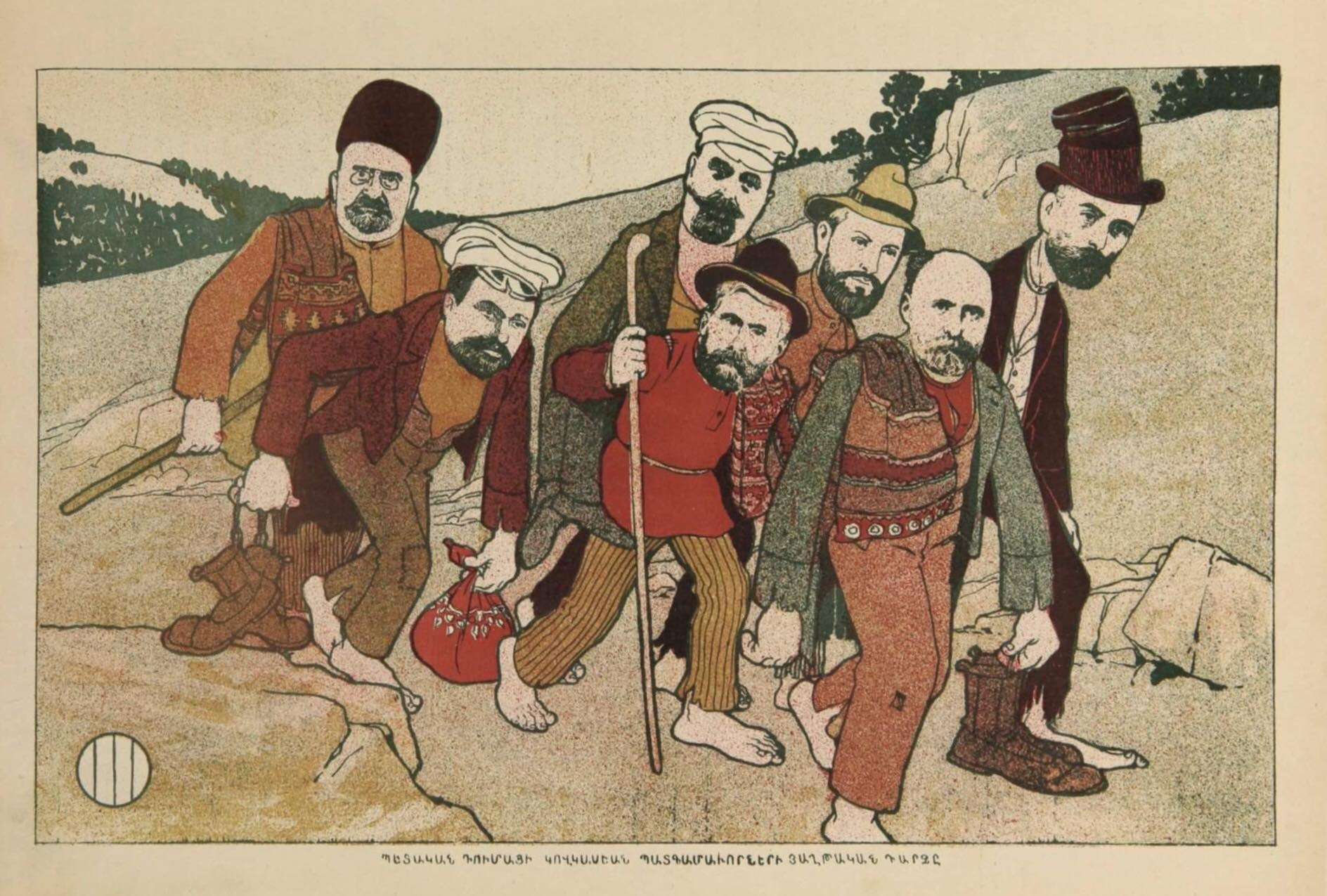
The victorious return of the Caucasian deputies of the State Duma

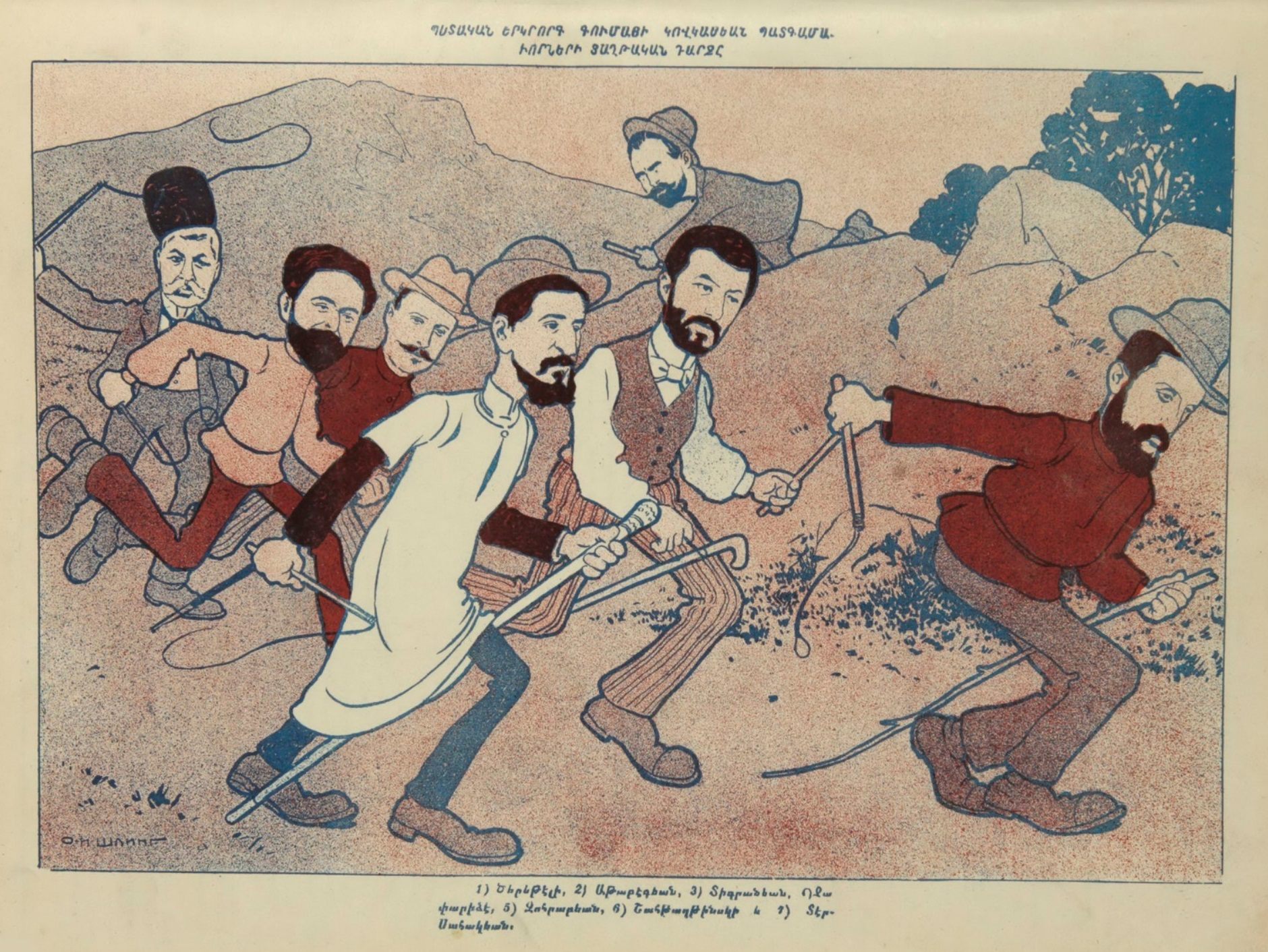
The victorious return of the Caucasian deputies of the State Duma of the Second Convocation

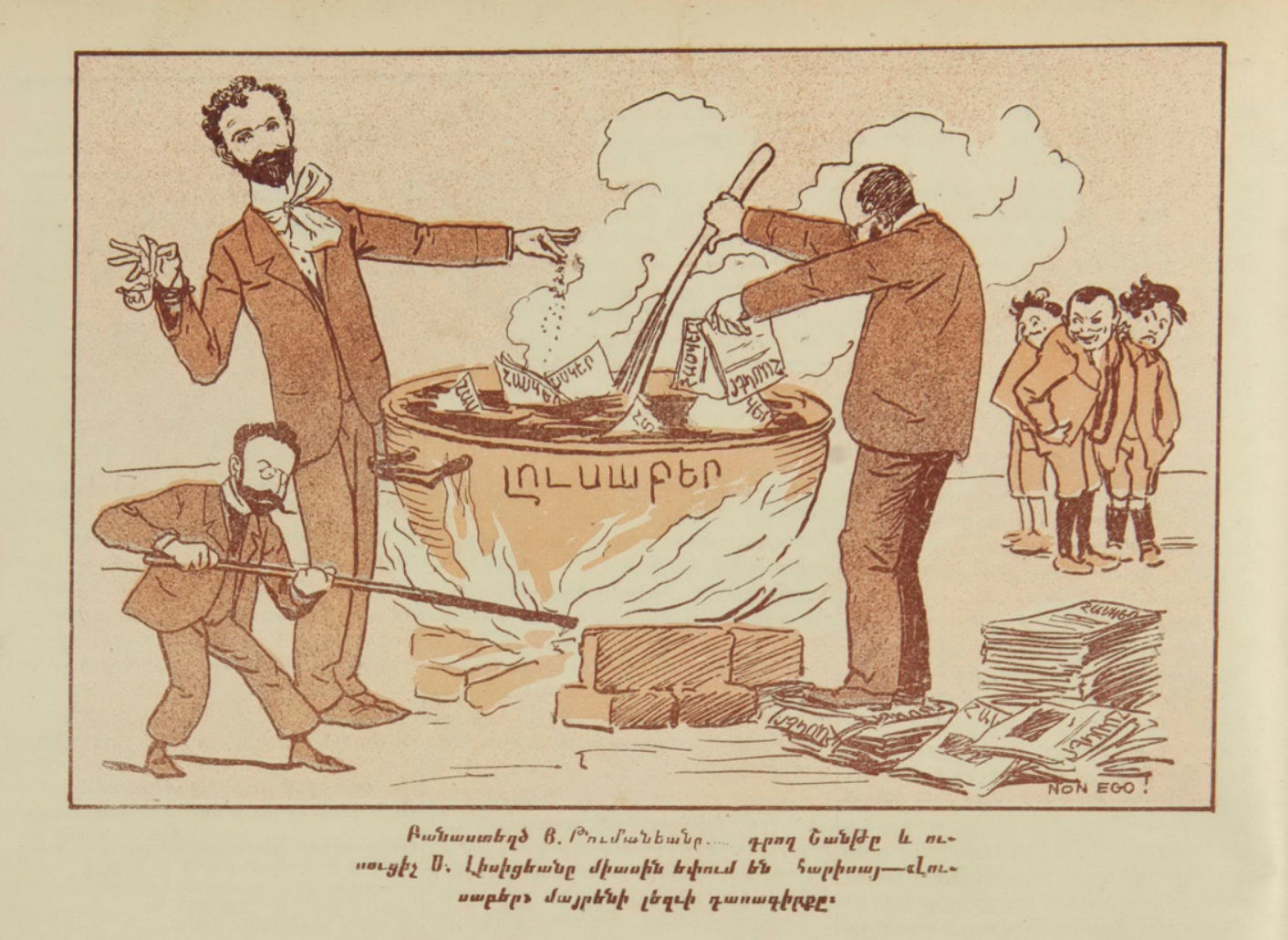
Hovhannes Tumanyan pours salt, Levon Shant stirs the fire, Stepan Lisitsian mixes the contents of the pot with one hand, adds Hasker numbers with the other to Lusaber, mother tongue textbook.

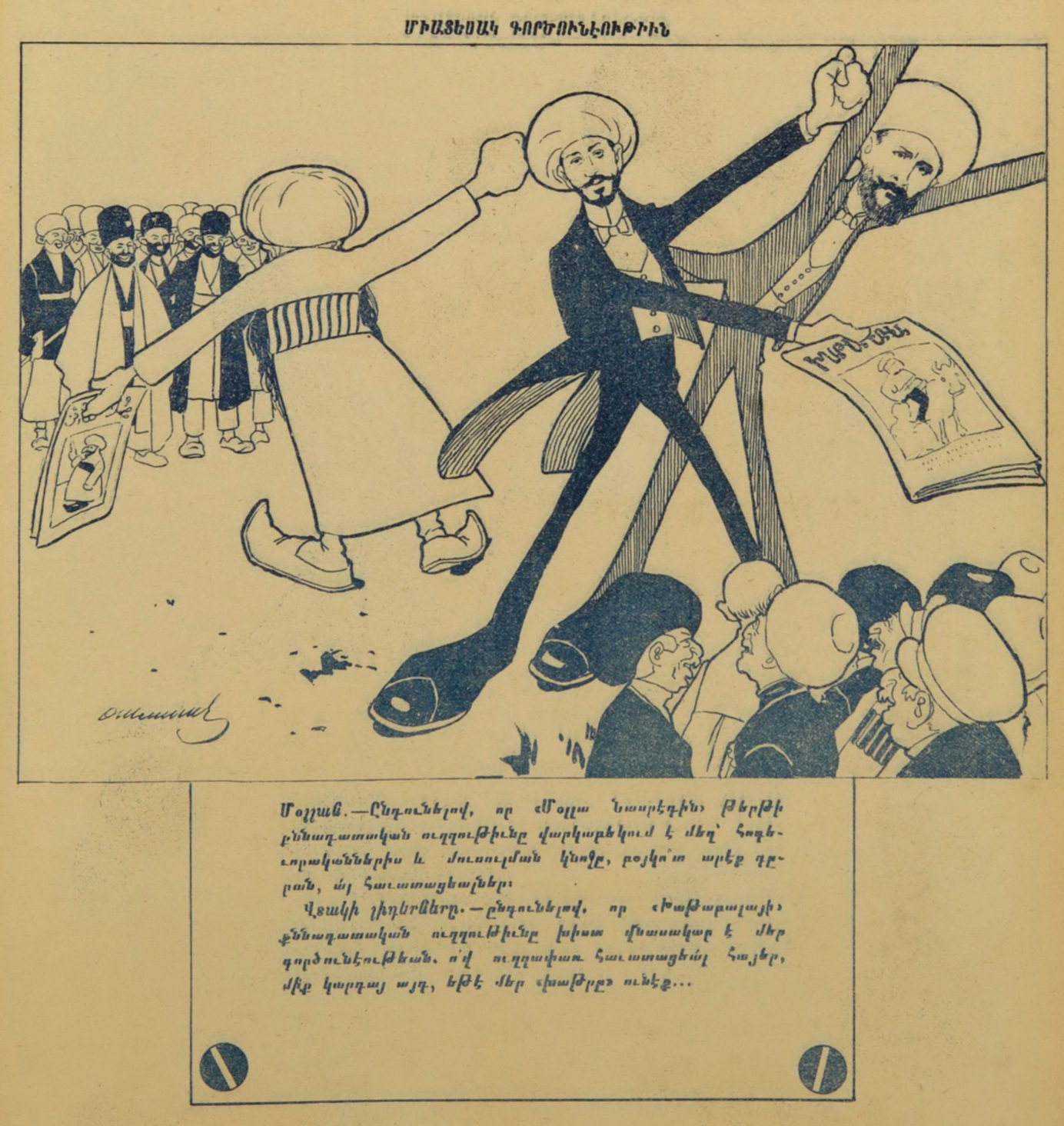
Mullah for Azerbaijanis and Vdak leaders for Armenians are calling for a boycott of Molla Nasreddin and Khatabala respectively
Armenian–Tatar massacres

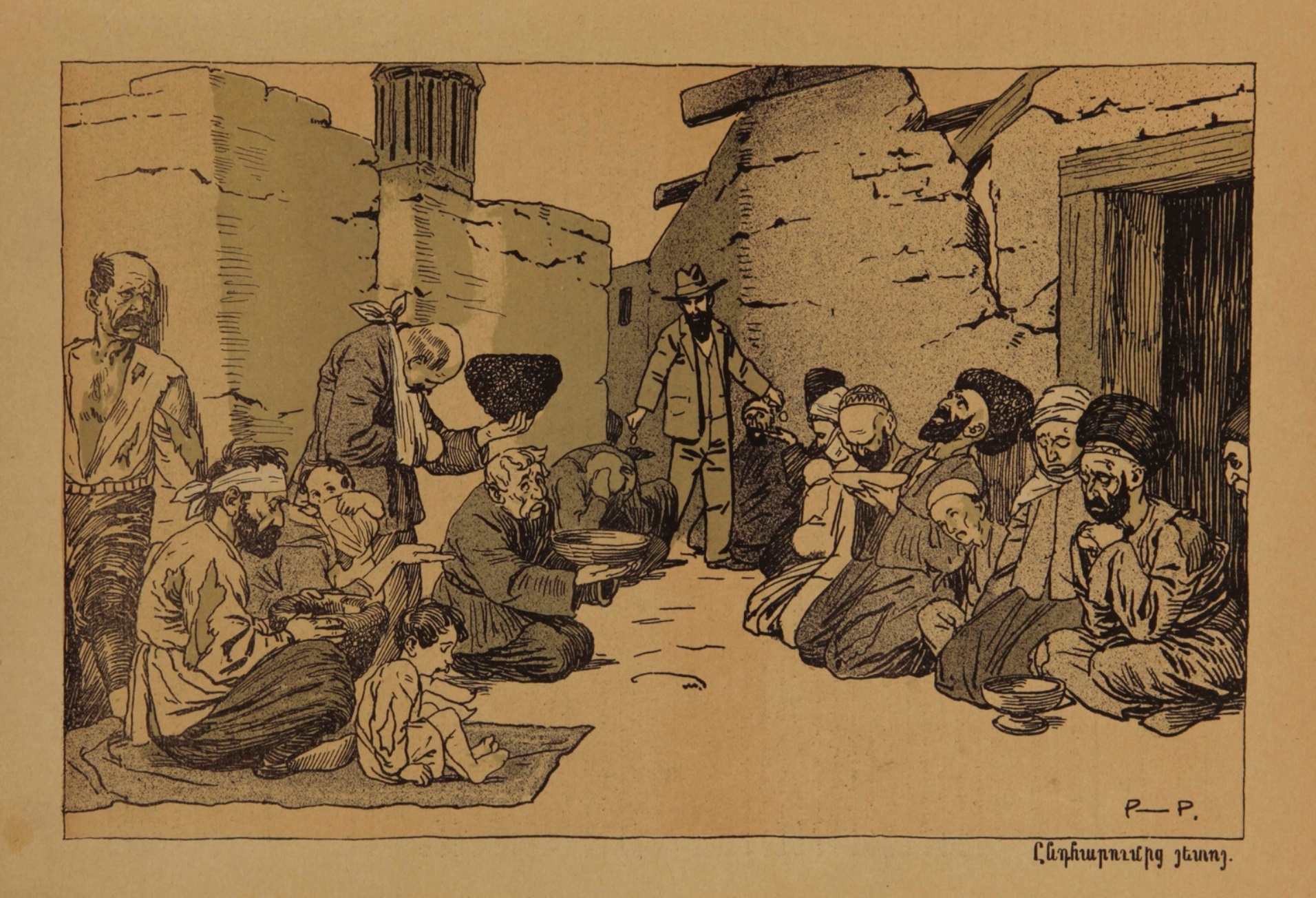

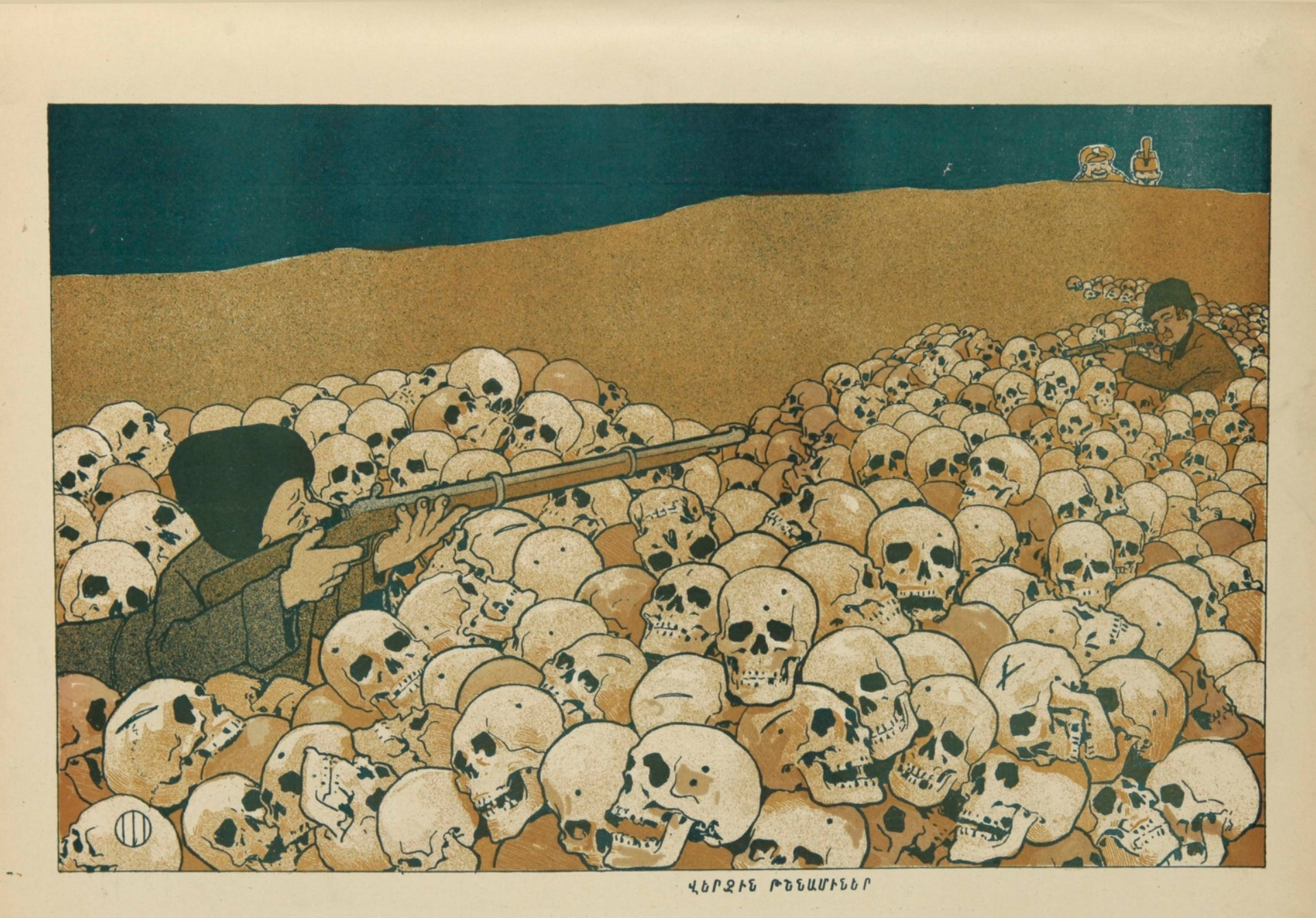

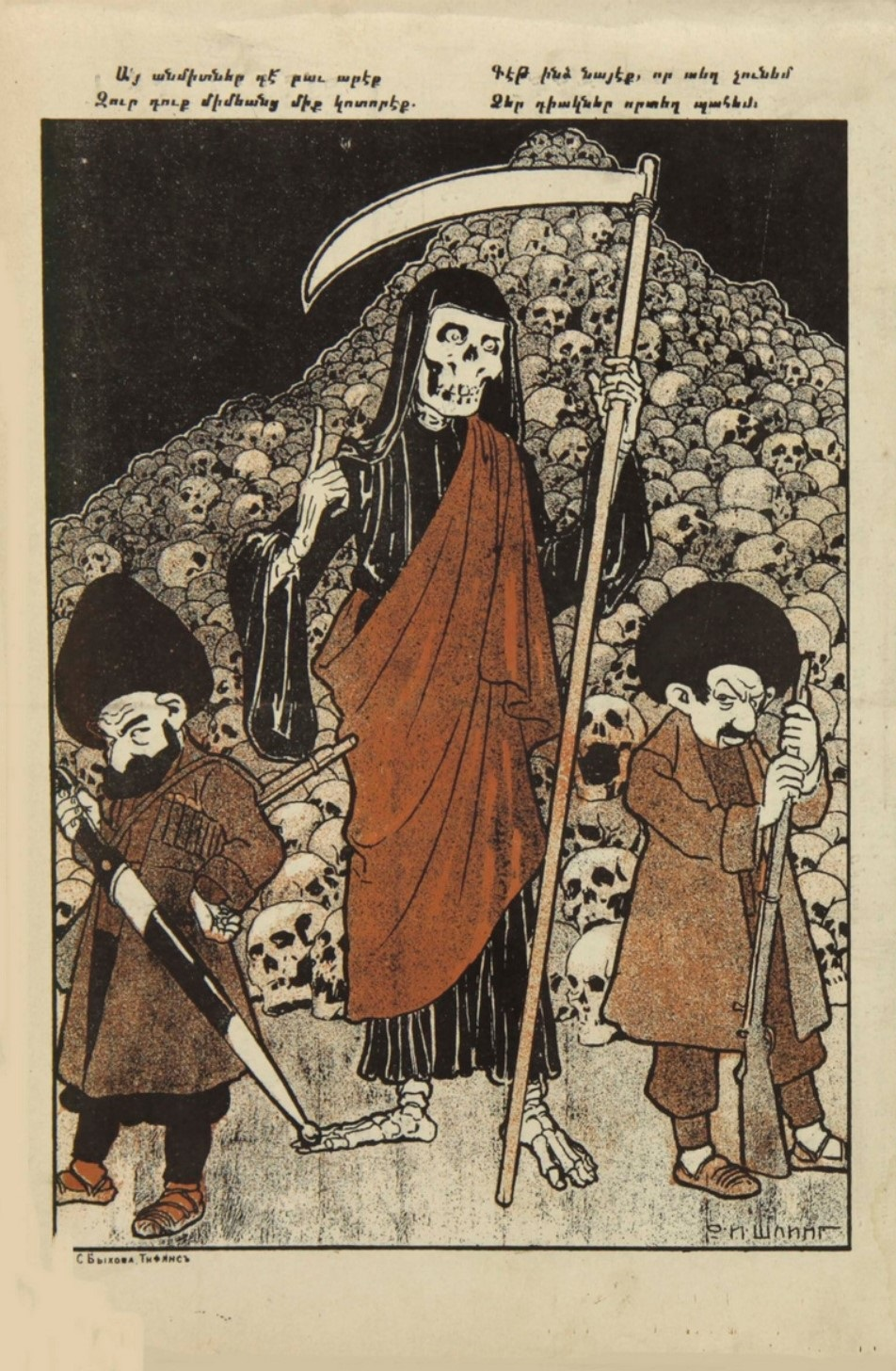

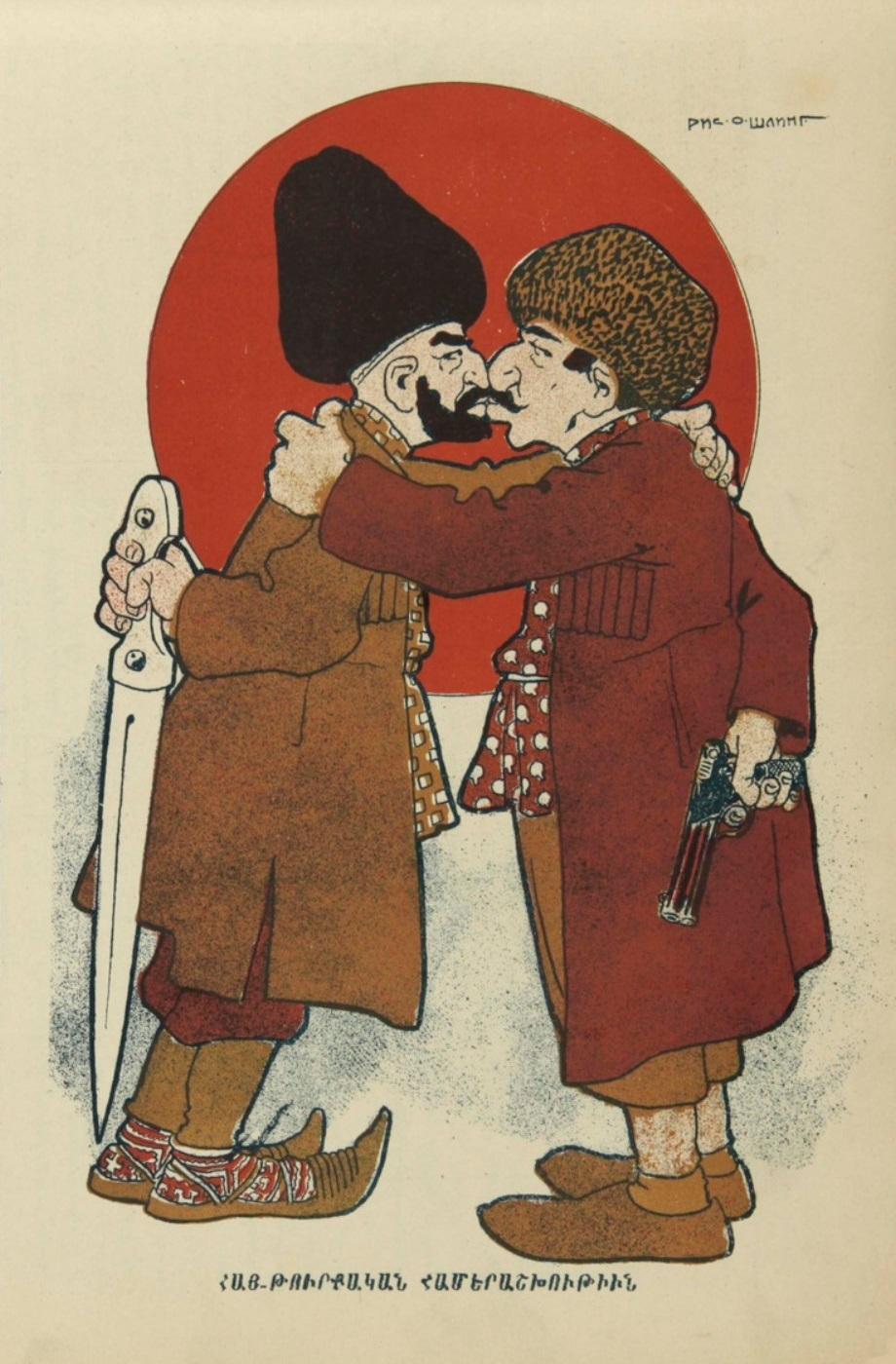
