= Rene Schmerling =

Georgian art historian

Rene Oskarovna Schmerling
- რენე შმერლინგი
- Born: December 5, 1901; Tbilisi, Georgia
- Died: February 18, 1967; Tbilisi, Georgia
- Other names: Renee, Renée, René, Renė; R. O.; Šmerling, Šmerlingi, Shmerling; Шмерлинг, Рене Оскаровна

Rene Oskarovna Schmerling (Georgian: რენე შმერლინგი; December 5, 1901 – February 18, 1967) was a Georgian art historian and art critic famous for her work on medieval and Byzantine Georgian art.

== Biography ==
Born in Tbilisi, Georgia in 1901, Schmerling was the daughter of painter and graphic artist Oscar Schmerling.

She graduated from Tbilisi State Academy of Arts in 1929. Schmerling worked at the State Museum of Georgia. In 1941, she was one of the founders of the Institute of History of Georgian Art (today the Giorgi Chubinashvili National Centre for the Study of Georgian Art History and Monument Protection) at the Georgian National Academy of Sciences. She was a senior researcher there until her death in 1967.

Her work concerned Georgian paleography, architecture, ironworking, illuminated manuscripts, and other medieval and Byzantine arts. She led expeditions to Svaneti and Dagestan to study the early Christian architecture of these regions in the 1950s. She trained many future scholars of Georgian art.

She was also an art critic. At one of the first artistic exhibitions in Tbilisi after the loosening of censorship with the death of Stalin in 1953, she said, "I am glad that browns have left these walls and that true colors shine on them now."

Her collection of bookplates (ex libris), which includes works by famous Georgian artists Vladimir Grigolia and Nikoloz Chernishkov (ru), was the subject of an exhibition in 2014.

== Selected publications ==
- Samples of Decorative Decoration of Georgian Manuscripts (Obrazcy dekorativnogo ubranstva gruzinskich rukopisej: al'bom iz 32 tabljc),Tbilisi: Gruzinskaja filial Akademii nauk SSSR, 1940.
- Georgian Architectural Ornaments (Gruzinskij architekturyj ornament), Tbilisi: Gosudarstvennoe izdatel'stvo, 1954.
- Outskirts of Tbilisi: an Architectural Guide (Okrestnosti Tbilisi : architekturnyi putevoditel'), Tbilisi: Izd. Akad. Nauk. Gruzinskoj SSR, 1960.
- Forms in the Architecture of Medieval Georgia (Малые формы в архитектуре средневековой Грузии., Malye formy v arkhitekture srednevekovoĭ Gruzii), Tbilisi: Izdatel'stvo Akademii nauk Gruzinskoĭ SSR, 1962.
- Illuminations of Books and Manuscripts (Chudožestvennoe oformlenie gruzinskoj rukopisnoj knigi IX - XI vv) Tbilisi: Met︠s︡niereba, 1967–1979.
- Sepulchral Tombs in Dagestan (Rez'ba po kamnju v Dagestane), 1966.
- Metechi Temple in Tbilisi (Chram Metechi v Tbilisi), Tbilisi: Izd. Mezniereba, 1969.(published posthumously).
- Ot Tbilisi do Kavkavi, Mecʻniereba, 1991 (published posthumously).
