= Oskar Schmerling =

Russian and Georgian illustrator

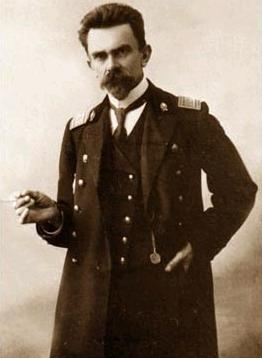
- Born: July 13, 1863; Stavropol, Stavropol Governorate, Russian Empire
- Died: January 2, 1938 (aged 74); Tbilisi, Georgia SSR
- Education: Imperial Academy of Arts
- Alma mater: Munich Academy of Fine Arts
- Children: Rene Schmerling

Oskar Schmerling (Russian: Оскар Иванович Шмерлинг; Georgian: ოსკარ ივანეს ძე შმერლინგი, Stavropol, 1863 – Tiflis, 1938) was a Russian and Georgian illustrator of ethnic German background.

== Early life ==
Oskar Schmerling was born into a Lutheran German family in the North Caucasian city of Stavropol on 13 July [O.S. 1 July] 1863. His family came to the Russian Empire on the wave of German emigration at the beginning of the 19th century. His father, Ivan, was a lieutenant colonel in the Imperial Russian Army. His mother Matilda was the sister of the architect Albert Salzmann, who designed a number of buildings in Tiflis, including the building of the Tbilisi Art Gallery. Growing up with his uncle, he studied in Tiflis Real School.

== Education ==
According to Schmerling's own autobiography, his academic results weren't good and he tried to publish a periodical named Mosquito (Georgian: კოღო, romanized: k'ogho) unsuccessfully in 1880–1881. He later started drawing caricatures for Ivan Petroev's magazine Scorpion (Georgian: ფალანგა, romanized: palanga). After quitting his job, he went on to study at Faculty of Graphic Art of Imperial Academy of Arts in Saint Petersburg in August 1884 and graduated in 1889. He continued to collaborate with others on various publications during his study. According to his autobiography, these were the German magazine Pipifax, Russian publications Son of the Fatherland (Russian: Сын отечества) and The Jester (Russian: Шут). He moved to his father's house in Khankendi where he gathered a group of amateur actors and set up a theater troupe in 1889. He left for Munich in 1891, enrolling in Academy of Fine Arts, specializing on the painting of battle scenes. He collaborated with Bavarian magazine called Cyclists' Humor (German: Radfahr Humor) and Münchener Volks-Zeitung newspaper during his time there.

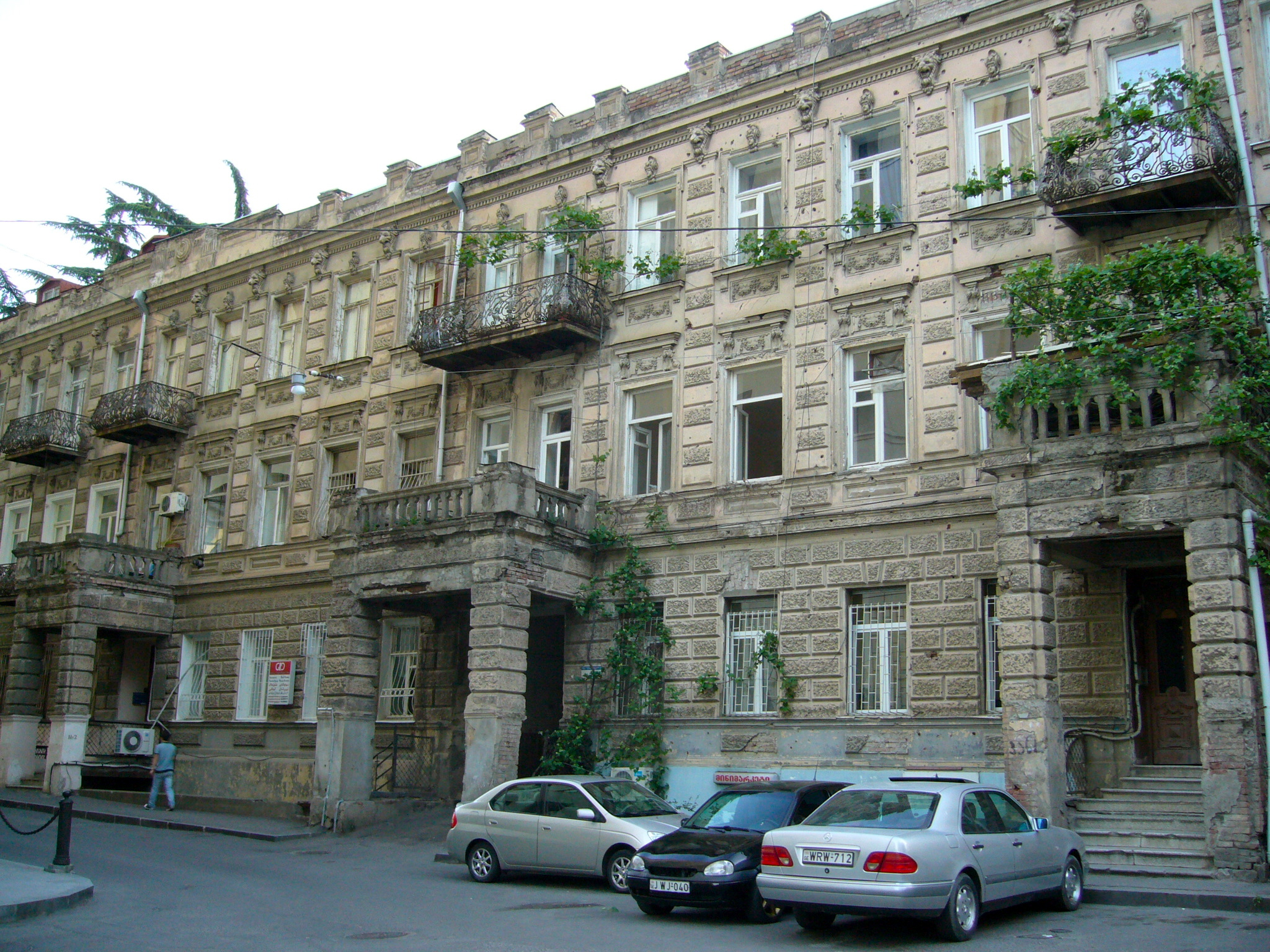
House where Schmerling lived in Tbilisi

== Career ==
After graduation in 1892, he returned to Tiflis and began teaching at Transcaucasian Girls' Institute. He illustrated Iakob Gogebashvili's children's book Mother Language (დედა ენა). Schmerling was the director of the school of painting and sculpture at the Caucasian Society for the Encouragement of Fine Arts in 1902–1916, and was the professor in Tiflis Academy of Arts. He worked as drawing instructor in Mikhailov Trade School in Tiflis starting February 1914. He moved to Ganja, Azerbaijan Democratic Republic in 1919, where he worked for state publishing house. He continued to work in People's Education Committee and publishing house after Soviet takeover in 1920 and drew posters for Azerbaijani branch of the Russian Telegraph Agency until 1921. He moved back to Tiflis in August 1921, collaborated with a number of Soviet newspapers.

His disciples include Lado Gudiashvili, Ketevan Goliashvili, Aleksandre Tsimakuridze, Mikheil Chiaureli, Grigor Vahramian Gasparbeg and others.

== Works ==
He participated in exhibitions of the Caucasian Society for the Encouragement of Fine Arts, and illustrated a lot of Georgian children's literature. He is most remembered for the cartoon series from the life of old Tiflis, which were first published in the 1910s in the form of postcards. Starting 1901, he collaborated with contemporary periodicals as the Georgian Notice Sheet (Georgian: ცნობის ფურცელი, romanized: tsnobis purtseli), Devil's Whip (Georgian: ეშმაკის მატრახი, romanized: eshmak'is mat'rakhi), Stomach (Georgian: შურდული, romanized: shurduli), Wasp (Georgian: ბზიკი, romanized: bzik'i), the Armenian Khatabala ((published in Tiflis in 1906–1916), the Azerbaijani Molla Nasraddin (published in Tiflis in 1906–1914 and in 1917) and others.

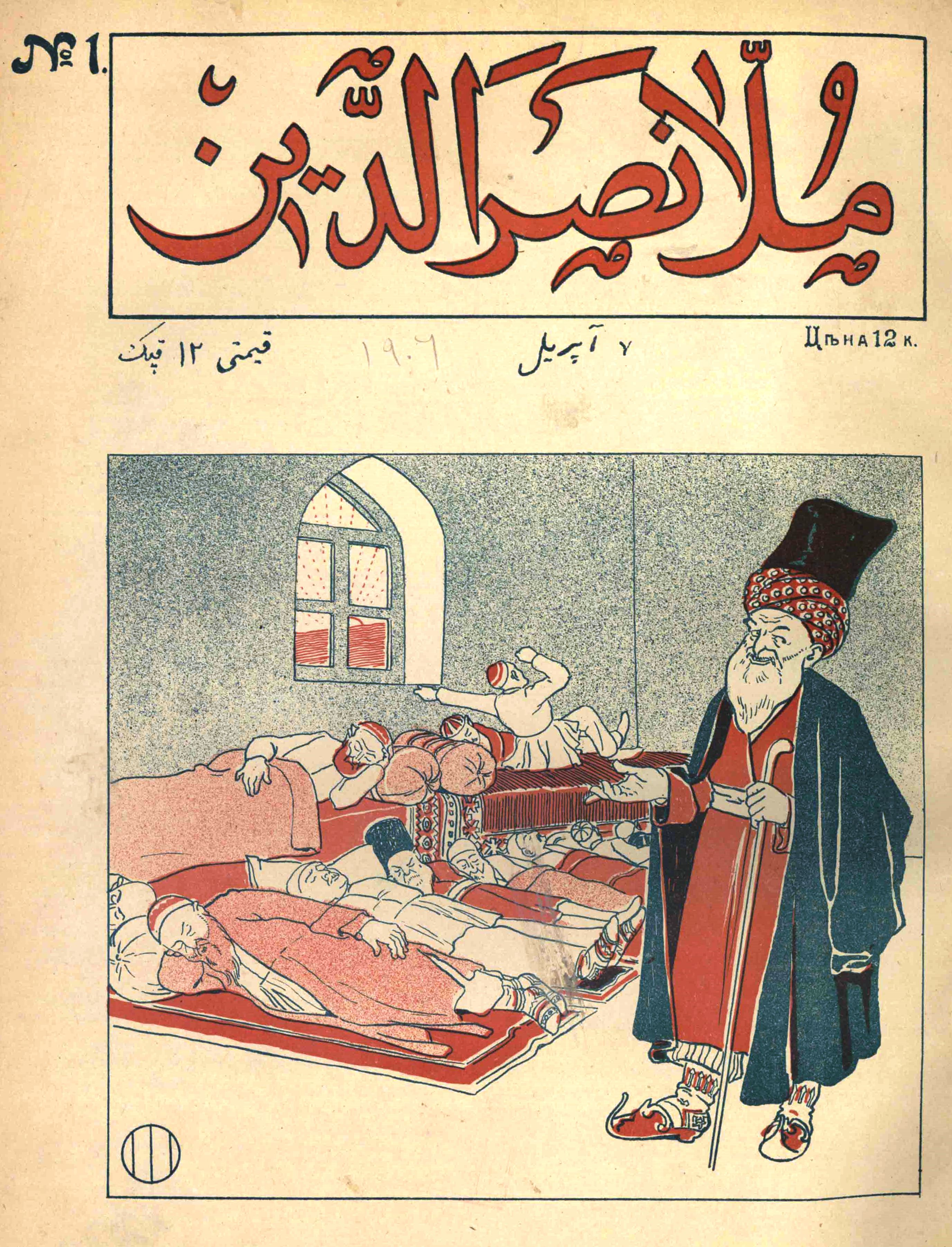
The first issue of Molla Nasraddin (1906)

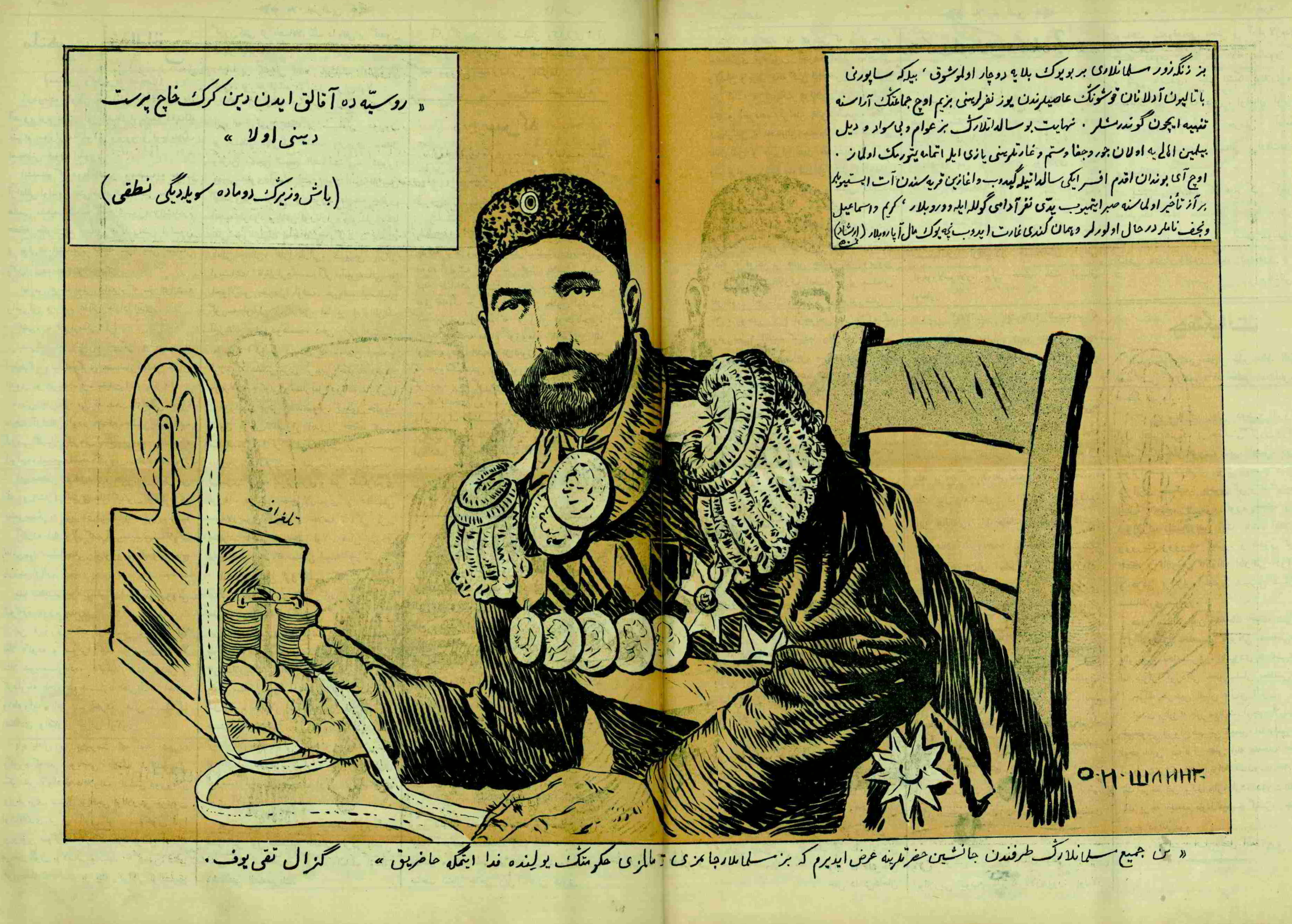
Caricature of Zeynalabdin Taghiyev for Molla Nasraddin

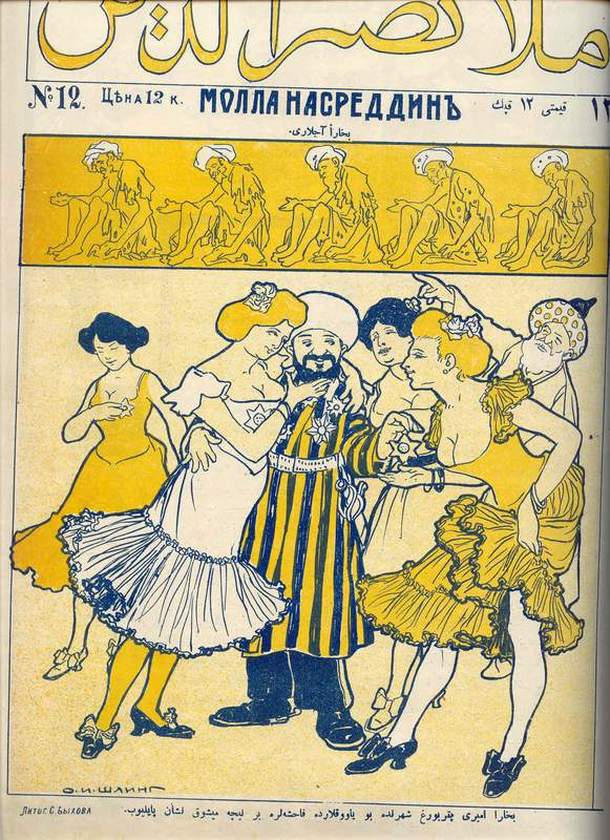
Caricature of 'Abd al-Ahad Khan for Molla Nasraddin

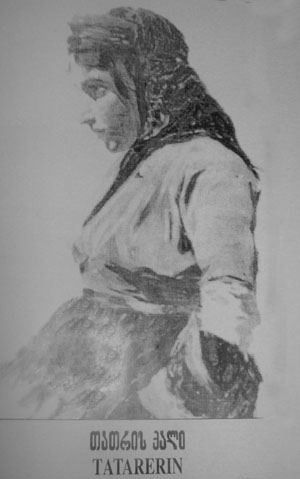
A Tatar (Azerbaijani) woman in Georgia

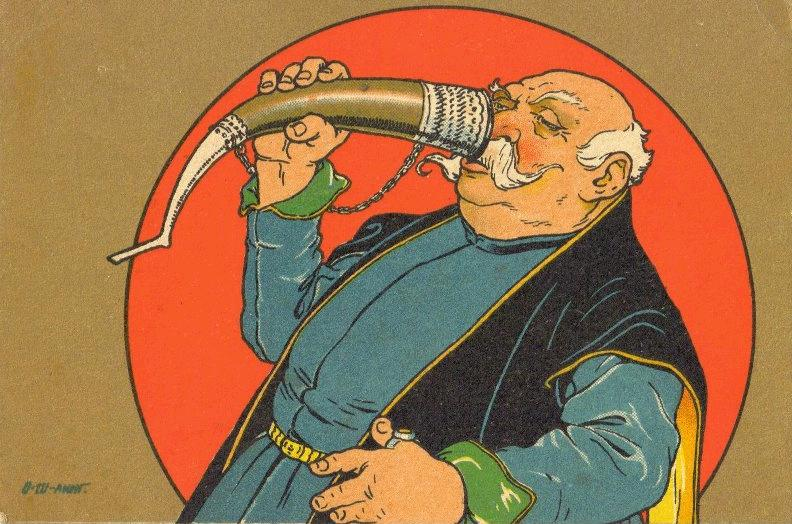
"To your health!" - Postcard

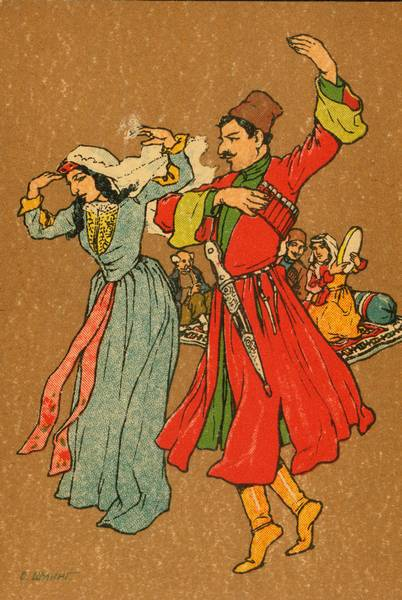
Lezginka

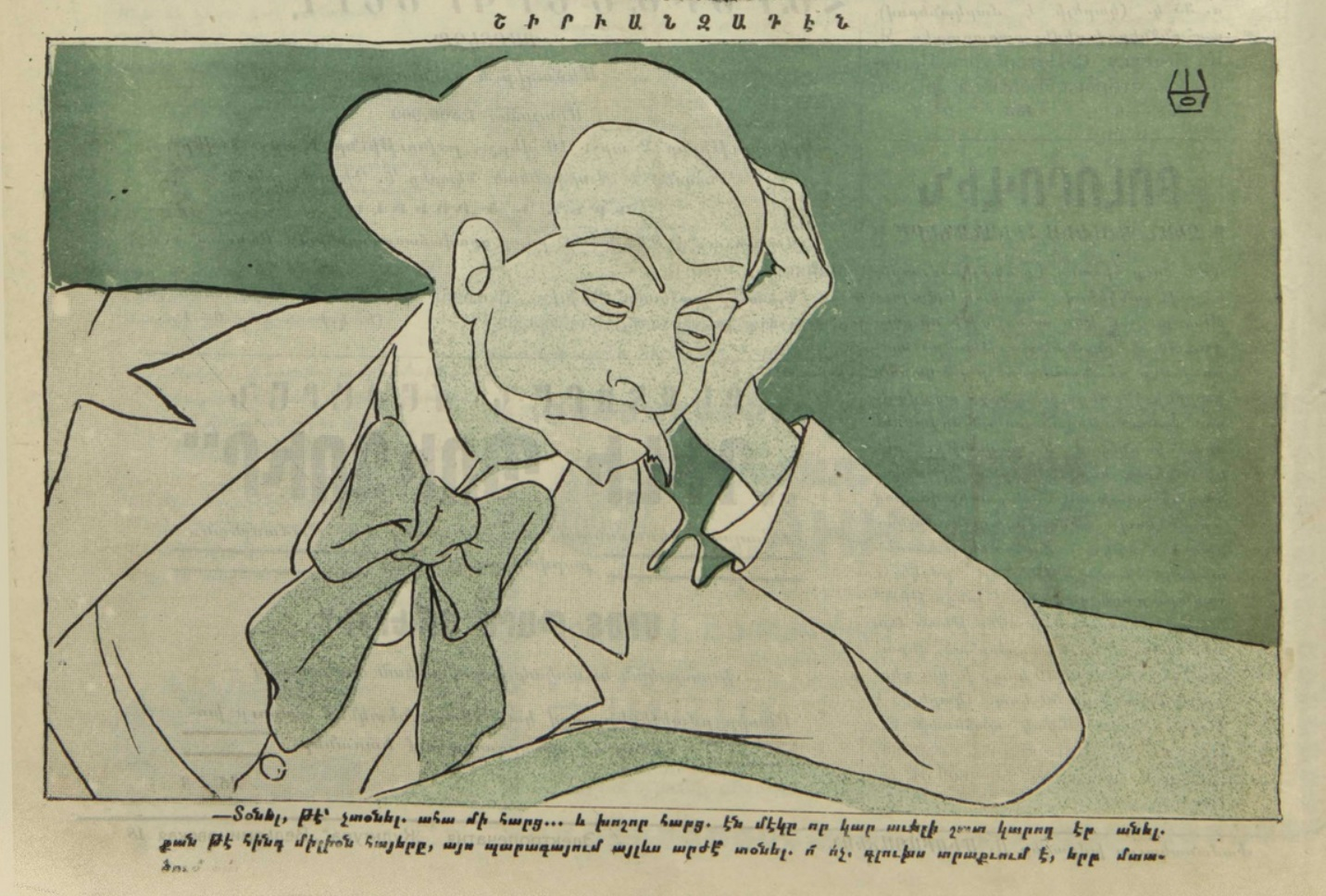
Caricature of Alexander Shirvanzade for Khatabala

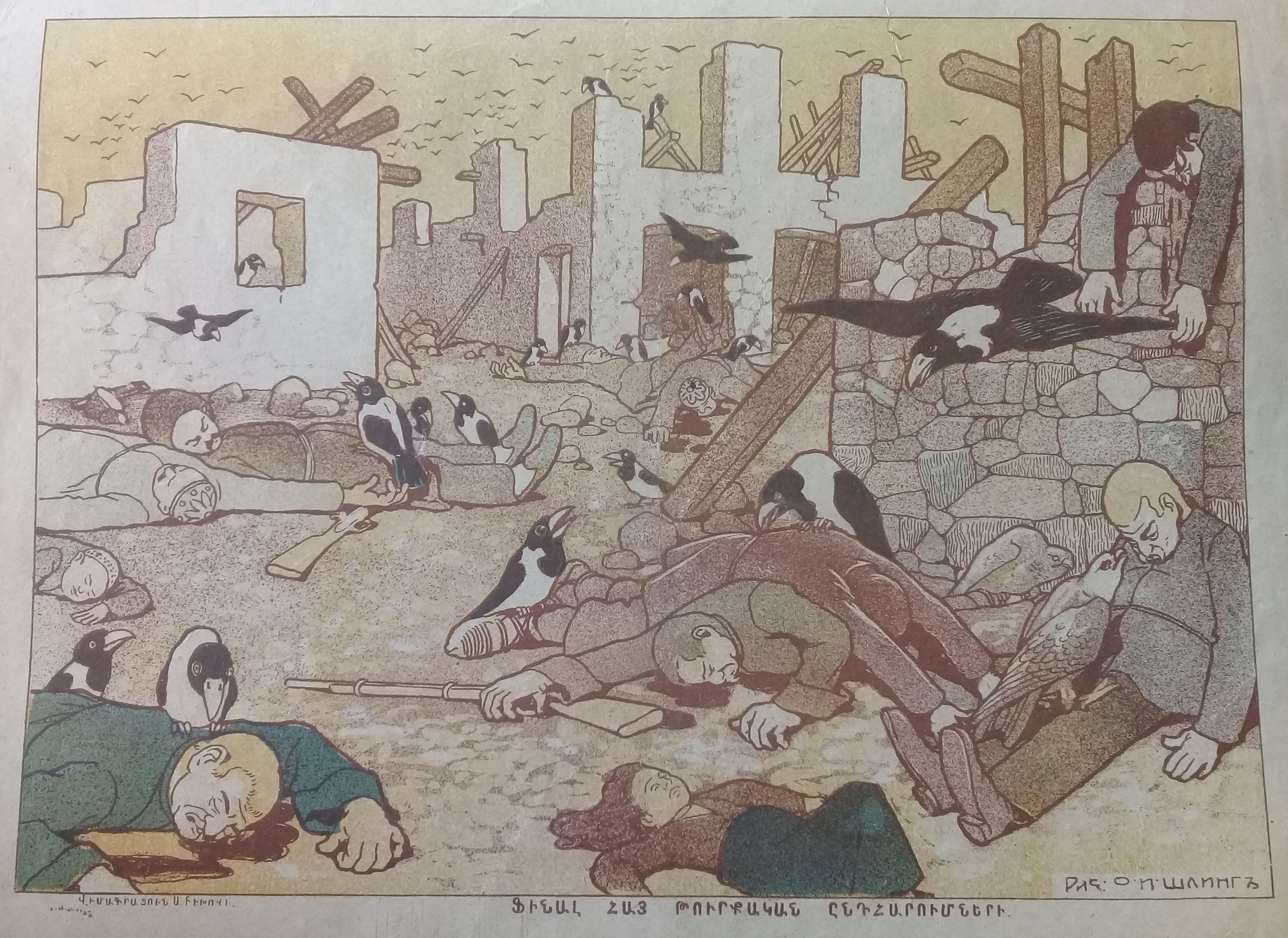
"End of Armenian–Turkish massacres" for Khatabala

== Family ==
He was married to a woman named Anzhelina Albertovna. Their first child, the future art historian Rene Schmerling, was born in 1901. Their son Edgar was born in 1906. Schmerling died on 2 January 1938 and was buried in Vake Cemetery in Tbilisi.

Schmerling was the uncle of the artist and set designer Alexander Von Salzman, who from 1917 created many caricatures for the Devils' Whip.

== Notes ==
1. Published in Saint Petersburg, 1887-1889.
