= Aida Mahmudova =

Azerbaijani artist

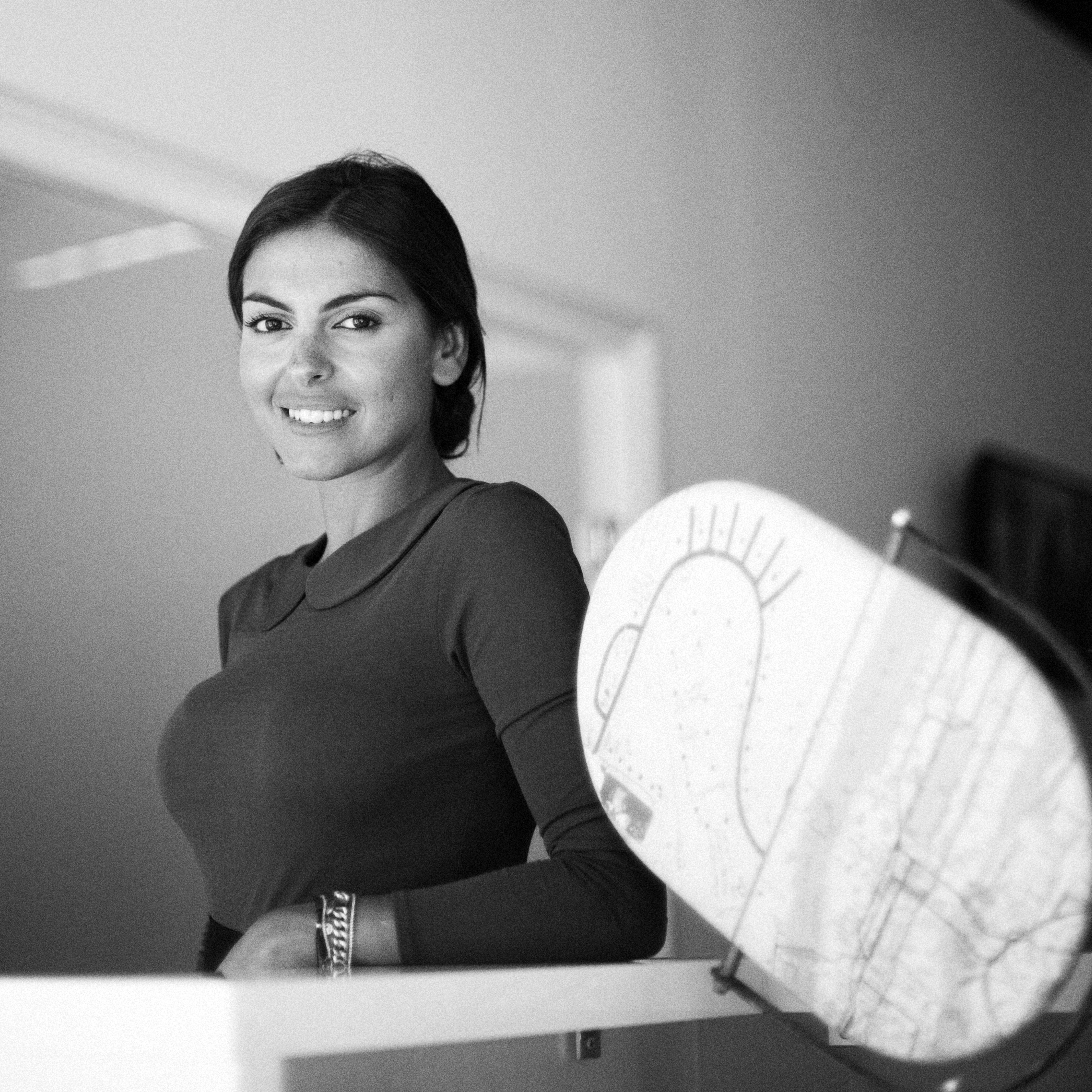
- Born: January 10, 1982 (age 44); Baku, Azerbaijan SSR, Soviet Union
- Education: Central Saint Martins
- Notable work: YARAT Contemporary Art Space
- Movement: Contemporary Art
- Website: https://aidamahmudova.com

Aida Mahmudova (Azerbaijani: Aida Altay qızı Mahmudova) is an Azerbaijani artist. She is best known for being founder of YARAT Contemporary Art Space.

== Early life and education ==
Mahmudova was born on 10 January 1982 in USSR. She is daughter to Nargiz Pashayeva and a niece of the vice president of Azerbaijan Mehriban Aliyeva. In 2006, she graduated from Central Saint Martins College of Art and Design in London with a BA Degree in Fine Art.

== Career ==
In 2011, she founded YARAT, a not-for-profit contemporary art organisation based in Baku, Azerbaijan. Since 2012, Mahmudova has been Director of the Baku Museum of Modern Art. The same year she founded YAY Gallery, a social enterprise that is now operating as ARTIM Project Space. She works in installation, sculpture, and painting to capture forgotten and marginal corners of her rapidly modernising country. She has participated in exhibitions with other artists and her works have been exhibited internationally. In 2015, she had her first solo exhibition ‘Passing By’ in the US at the Leila Heller Gallery. Mahmudova's work has been shown at the 55th Venice Biennale for the group exhibition Love Me, Love Me Not (2013) and at the 56th Venice Biennale at the exhibition Vita Vitale curated by Artwise (2015). In 2021, her work was presented alongside others in the "Safar: Journey in the Middle East" exhibition by historian Farian Sabahi in Parma, Italy, showing the Middle East in the year before significant conflicts in the area began.

== Style ==
Aida Mahmudova's works have been exhibited internationally and use various techniques and media. Despite a varied practice, the artist’s main focus remains her exploration of material as a tool for experimenting with and navigating the world she inhabits.

Early on in her work, Mahmudova developed a curiosity towards material, which manifested itself through experimentation with light, color, and matter in her landscapes and semi-abstract canvases. As her paintings became increasingly more layered, the artist expanded her practice into the three-dimensional, applying the same approach to sculpture and creating environments both emotive and intense. She continually mixes layer upon layer of diverse material, such as paper, clay, paint, cement, stone, and, more recently, epoxy resin and untreated marble.

Mahmudova’s artworks a use thick, high contrast palat to create energetic, colourful paintings, seldom applying bright tones. Her ‘Rambling Vine, 2015’ demonstrates her use of thick, dry layer of pigment to create the rough texture. She tends to tone down the bright colour like typical yellow to be macaroon yellow mixed with pickle green and grey.

This mixture of colour is cohesive to her paint brushes, bold and yet non-systematic or formulated. It could be interpreted as struggling against rules. In ’The Neighbours’ and ‘The Fountain’, she does not limit herself to using thick textures to express herself. She would use wet, low contrast, dripping liquid paints through the heights of canvas to express a sense of melancholy. Both textured and loose-formed artworks suggested the same idea, Aida do not want to limit her paintings so that most of her works cannot find a clear-cut outline of objects. “Memory is the material of my work.” – Aida Mahmudova often applied this brief but very precise analysis on her art pieces.”

What makes her artwork so blurry and dreamy is her memories cannot be displayed exactly. “My art is a constant and continued investigation of my memory, as it informs my identity. The touchstone of this search and the main source of my inspiration is the forgotten, untouched, and undeveloped locations in Azerbaijan. Our physical world is shifting at a pace so rapid that our memories are frequently blurred, and our ‘remembered’ past is often forgotten or altered by our subconscious.” There are uncertainties in between. “Aida Mahmudova’s artwork delves into the emotive facets of ‘longing’ – specifically, the longing for the memory of a place, rather than for the place itself. The artist simultaneously meditates on how memory is tied to the debris of the past. Her paintings and other works present history as a collection of mementos, which appear fragmented and partial, and are accessible only through the mediation of personal perceptions and emotional responses.”

== Personal life ==
Aida Mahmudova currently lives and works in Baku, Azerbaijan. She is married and has 2 children.

== Artworks ==
Most of the artwork done by Mahmudova is inspired by the landscapes and the built environment. In 2012, her work “Recycled” was exhibited at the 012 Baku Public Art Festival.

=== Solo exhibitions ===
In 2015, Mahmudova had her first solo exhibition "Passing By" in the United States. In this exhibition, seven paintings were displayed. The theme of the paintings was inspired by her previous work. Also, it is inspired by the built environment and the landscapes of her living space. In 2021 presented the artist’s second solo show in the United States – PASTPRESENTSFUTURE in Sapar Contemporary Gallery, New York, USA In 2022, her 'Liminality' show opened at the Gazelli Gallery in Mayfair, London, curated by art writer Alistair Hicks. In November 2022, Aida Mahmudova presented Heaven Can Wait solo exhibition project at Zurab Tsereteli Museum of Modern Art, Tbilisi, Georgia

=== Group exhibitions ===
==== 2012 ====
- 012 Baku Public Art Festival, Baku, Azerbaijan
- Merging Bridges, Baku Museum of Modern Art (MOMA), Baku, Azerbaijan
- Fly To Baku. Contemporary Art from Azerbaijan (Traveling exhibition), Hotel Salomon de Rothschild, Paris, France; Phillips de Pury & Company, London, UK
- Foreword, Alternative Art Space of YARAT, Baku, Azerbaijan

==== 2013 ====
- Love Me, Love Me Not: Contemporary Art from Azerbaijan and its Neighbors, Curated by Dina Nasser-Khadivi, Heydar Aliyev Center, Baku, Azerbaijan
- Love Me, Love Me Not, Curated by Dina Nasser-Khadivi, Collateral Event for the 55th Venice Biennale, Venice, Italy
- Home Sweet Home, Azerbaijan Cultural Center, Paris, France
- Home Sweet Home, Baku Museum of Modern Art (MOMA), Baku, Azerbaijan
- Fly To Baku. Contemporary Art from Azerbaijan (Traveling exhibition), Kunsthistorisches Museum, Neue Burg, Vienna, Austria
- Spazio D – MAXXI building, National Museum of XXI Century Arts, Rome, Italy; Multimedia Art Museum, Moscow, Russia; me Collectors Room, Berlin, Germany

==== 2014 ====
- Here…Today, Old Sorting Office, London, UK
- Poetics of the Ordinary, Vienna Art Fair, The New Contemporary, Vienna, Austria

==== 2015 ====
- Vita Vitale, Curated by ArtWise, 56th Venice Biennale, Venice, Italy
- Making Histories, YARAT Contemporary Art Centre, Baku, Azerbaijan
- Exploring Inward, Louise Blouin Foundation, London, UK

==== 2016 ====
- 300 Words on Resistance, YARAT, Baku, Azerbaijan
- Art Dubai, YAY Gallery Stand F8, Madinat Jumeirah, Dubai, UAE
- Art Paris Fair, YAY Gallery Booth G6, Grand Palais, Paris, France

==== 2017 ====
- Between the Sea and Mountains, YAY Gallery, Baku, Azerbaijan

==== 2018 ====
- Bodily Landscapes, YAY Gallery, Baku, Azerbaijan

==== 2019 ====
- Starry Skies, Traveling exhibition, Azerbaijan regions
- Живопись, Baku Museum of Modern Art (MoMA), Baku, Azerbaijan

==== 2020 ====
- Fogs turned into epic story in my head, YARAT Centre, Baku, Azerbaijan

==== 2022 ====
- Art Dubai, Gazelli Art House Booth, Madinat Jumeirah Conference & Events Centre, Dubai, UAE

== Awards ==
- 2015: Luxury Lifestyle 2015 - CHELEBI Furniture & Decor
