= Museyib Amirov =

Azerbaijani painter

Museyib Amirov Müseyib Əmirov
- Born: December 24, 1963 (age 62); Baku, Azerbaijan SSR, USSR
- Education: Azerbaijan State Institute of Arts
- Awards: Honored Artist of Azerbaijan

Museyib Arif oghlu Amirov (Azerbaijani: Müseyib Arif oğlu Əmirov, born December 24, 1963) is an Azerbaijani painter, Honored Artist of the Republic of Azerbaijan.

== Biography ==
Museyib Amirov was born in 1963, in Baku to the family of artist Arif Amirov. In 1979 he graduated from Azim Azimzade Azerbaijan State Art School, and in 1987 from the Azerbaijan State Institute of Arts. He has been a member of the Union of Artists of Azerbaijan since 1996. He has also led the class of "Experimental Painting" at the Azerbaijan Academy of Arts for a while.

The artist has participated in many international projects, as well as exhibitions in Paris, Washington and Luxembourg. He has held a number of solo exhibitions. These include exhibitions organized in 2014 at YARAT Contemporary Art Space in Baku, in 2015 at the Baku Museum of Modern Art, and in 2019 in Moscow.

The artist's works are kept in a number of museums and galleries, in private collections in Azerbaijan, Russia, the United States, Sweden, France, Germany, Lithuania, the United Kingdom, Turkey, Italy, Denmark and Norway.

Museyib Amirov was awarded the honorary title of "Honored Artist of the Republic of Azerbaijan" on December 29, 2006, for his services to the development of fine arts in Azerbaijan.

He is the grandson of Museyib Shahbazov, the People's Commissar of Education of the Azerbaijan SSR.
