= YARAT Contemporary Art Space =

Art space in Baku

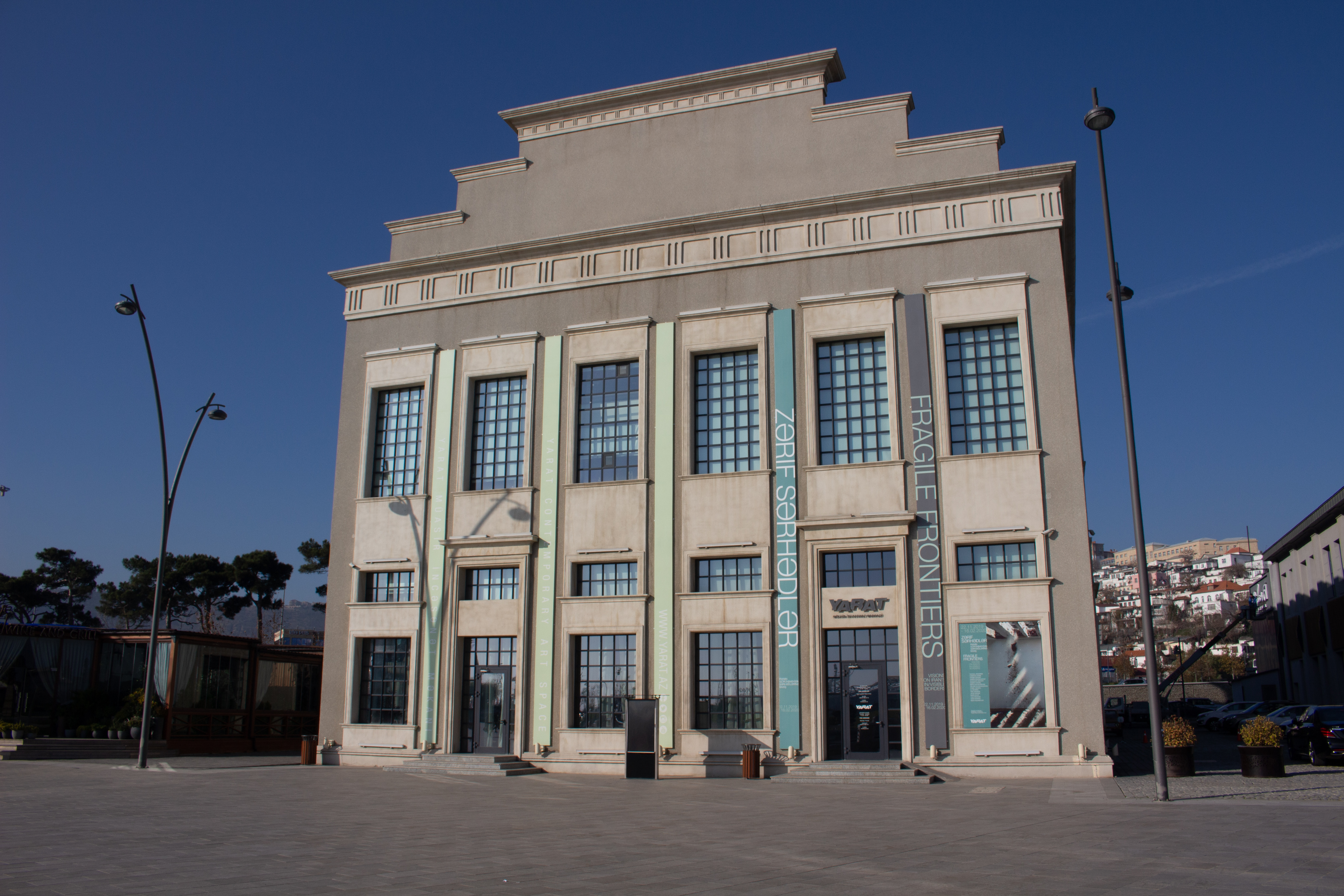
- Formation: 2011
- Founder: Aida Mahmudova
- Founded at: Baku, Azerbaijan
- Legal status: Non-profit art organization
- Headquarters: YARAT Building
- Coordinates: 40.340135°N 49.837443°E
- Website: https://www.yarat.az

YARAT Contemporary Art Space (Azerbaijani: YARAT Müasir İncəsənət Məkanı) also referred to simply as YARAT, is a non-profit art organization based in Baku, Azerbaijan, founded by artist Aida Mahmudova in 2011. YARAT (Azerbaijani: yarat, lit. 'create') is dedicated to contemporary art with a long-term commitment to creating a hub for artistic practice, research, thinking and education in the Caucasus, Central Asia and the surrounding region. The building is located near National Flag Square.

== Building ==
YARAT Contemporary Art Centre is housed in a converted Soviet-era naval building overlooking the Caspian Sea, which acted as a maintenance base for navy ships in the 1960s. The conversion has created a 2000 m^{2} exhibition space spread over two floors. The building showcases temporary exhibitions by leading international artists, highlighting emerging movements and new commissions, as well as housing YARAT Collection displays and library. It was officially opened for the public on March 24, 2015.

== Structure ==
YARAT consists of the YARAT Contemporary Art Centre, Museum of Azerbaijani Painting of the XX-XXI Centuries and ARTIM Project Space.

Museum of Azerbaijani Painting of the XX-XXI Centuries (Azerbaijani: XX-XXI əsrlər Azərbaycan rəngkarlığı muzeyi) presents a series of exhibitions with the works from the collection of National Museums and Galleries and organize a public and education programme of events running. The Museum collaborates closely with educational institutions, and the museum's staff familiarises pupils and students with expositions through interactive tours by teaching them to comprehend and interpret art.

ARTIM Project Space was established in October 2015 in Old City. ARTIM (Azerbaijani: artım, lit. 'progress') shows experimental practices and new work by emerging Azeri art professionals (selected through open call) and the international artists from the residency programme. It features multiple small-scale projects each year and hosts ARTIM Lab, a programme enabling young artists to engage in workshops and daily studio practice to generate new ideas and works.

YARAT also have an educative public programme that includes courses, workshops, lectures, screenings, festivals, literature and theatre clubs and family weekends.

== Activity ==
YARAT has held exhibitions on international artists such as Shirin Neshat, Oscar Murillo, Erbossyn Meldibekov, Almagul Menlibayeva, Alexander Ugay, Nurakhmet Nurbol, Reza Aramesh, Vajiko Chachkhiani, Jan Fabre, Stephen G. Rhodes, Michelangelo Pistoletto, Shilpa Gupta, Zadie Xa, Taus Makhacheva, Pedro Gómez-Egaña, Kamrooz Aram, Dadbeh Bassir, Gelare Khoshgozaran, Timo Nasseri, Navid Nuur.

In April 2021 YARAT held the first-ever Baku Street Photography Festival, bringing together juries and lecturers consisting of local and foreign photographers. The contest part of the festival was titled Streets in Focus.

An exhibition by Dutch-Kurdish artist Ahmet Öğüt, No poem loves its poet closed when the artist objected to the political instrumentalization of his work by YARAT in the Nagorno-Karabakh conflict.

In April 2022, the organization together with the Icharishahar State Historical Architectural Reserve opened the first one-year Contemporary Art Scholl in Azerbaijan.

=== Group exhibitions ===
==== 2011 ====
- Foreword, group show, YARAT Alternative Space, Baku, Azerbaijan

==== 2012 ====
- Baku Public Art Festival, Baku, Azerbaijan
- Merging Bridges, Baku Museum of Modern Art (MOMA), Baku, Azerbaijan
- Masterpieces in Baku, Christie's on the Caspian, Baku, Azerbaijan
- Commonist, group show, YARAT Alternative Space, Baku, Azerbaijan
- Next Level, contemporary art exhibition, YAY Gallery, Baku, Azerbaijan

==== 2013 ====
- Participate!. Baku Public Art, Baku, Azerbaijan
- Love Me, Love Me Not: Contemporary Art from Azerbaijan and its Neighbors, Curated by Dina Nasser-Khadivi, Heydar Aliyev Center, Baku, Azerbaijan
- Love Me, Love Me Not, Curated by Dina Nasser-Khadivi, Collateral Event for the 55th Venice Biennale, Venice, Italy
- Home Sweet Home, group show, Azerbaijan Cultural Center, Paris, France
- Home Sweet Home, Baku Museum of Modern Art (MOMA), Baku, Azerbaijan
- Stalmate, solo exhibition, YAY Gallery, Baku, Azerbaijan
- Fly To Baku, Contemporary Art from Azerbaijan (Traveling exhibition), Kunsthistorisches Museum, Neue Burg, Vienna, Austria
- Transparency of Simplicity, solo photo exhibition, YAY Gallery, Baku, Azerbaijan
- Black Woman, solo exhibition, YAY Gallery, Baku, Azerbaijan
- Ganja Art Festival, Khan Baghı, Ganja, Azerbaijan
- The Other City, group show, YAY Gallery, Baku, Azerbaijan
- Vise Versa, solo show, YAY Gallery, Baku, Azerbaijan
- Echo, solo exhibition, YAY Gallery, Baku, Azerbaijan
- ZAVOD, group show, Old Conditioner Factory, Baku, Azerbaijan
- Girls Prefer Oilmen, solo show, YAY Gallery, Baku, Azerbaijan

==== 2014 ====
- Here...Today, London, UK
- Azerbaijan Booth, ART DUBAI Marker 2014, Dubai, UAE
- GRID International Photo Biennial, Amsterdam, Netherlands
- TalkCloud, solo show, YAY Gallery, Baku, Azerbaijan
- Moscow International Biennale For Young Art, Moscow, Russia
- Cosmoscow International Art Fair, YARAT's booth, Moscow, Russia
- Poetics of the Ordinary, VIENNAFAIR The New Contemporary, Vienna, Austria
- YAY Gallery UK Art Fair, Saatchi Gallery, London, UK
- Invasion, Museum 2014, group show by ARTIM Project Space, The National Museum of the Arts, The State Carpet Museum, The Historical Architectural Reserve Ateshgah Temple, Baku, Azerbaijan
- Blue Background, group exhibition, YAY Gallery, Baku, Azerbaijan
- Anasthesia, solo exhibition, YAY Gallery, Baku, Azerbaijan
- Two States of Being, Museyib Amirov's solo exhibition, YAY Gallery, Baku, Azerbaijan
- YAY Gallery at Contemporary Istanbul Art Fair, Istanbul, Turkey
- Conversations, solo exhibition, YAY Gallery, Baku, Azerbaijan

==== 2015 ====
- Isolation Room / Gallery Kit, installation project, Port Baku Mall, Baku, Azerbaijan
- The Home of My Eyes, YARAT Centre, Baku, Azerbaijan
- Making Histories, YARAT's Permanent Collection, YARAT Centre, Baku, Azerbaijan
- The Union of Fire and Water, YARAT's collateral event at the 56th Venice Biennale, Palazzo Barbaro, Venice, Italy
- Refraction, solo exhibition, YAY Gallery, Baku, Azerbaijan
- A Drop of Sky, Baku Public Art 2015, Baku, Azerbaijan
- Dua's, solo exhibition, YAY Gallery, Baku, Azerbaijan
- The Heart Is A Lonely Hunter, YARAT Centre, Baku, Azerbaijan
- XXXXXXY, group show, ARTIM Project Space, Baku, Azerbaijan
- The Unbearable Lightness of Being exhibition, in collaboration with Cuadro Gallery, YAY Gallery, Baku, Azerbaijan
- Mediator / Destroyer / Reviver, solo show, ARTIM Project Space, Baku, Azerbaijan
- Meeting Point exhibition, YAY Gallery collaboration with Cuadro Gallery, Dubai, UAE
- I Am Your Only Tiger, solo exhibition, YAY Gallery, Baku, Azerbaijan

==== 2016 ====
- You Don't Understand Me, experimental performance, ARTIM Project Space, Baku, Azerbaijan
- Traces of Time, travelling exhibition, Zagatala State Art Gallery, Zagatala, Azerbaijan
- Something From Nothing, solo show, YAY Gallery, Baku, Azerbaijan
- UMWELT, solo exhibition, YAY Gallery, Baku, Azerbaijan
- Paris Art Fair, Grand Palais, Paris Booth, G6, France, Paris
- To Be Surprised, To Surprise, group show, ARTIM Project Space, Baku, Azerbaijan
- Half Truths, group show, ARTIM Project Space, Baku, Azerbaijan
- Illuminato, group show, YARAT Studios, Baku, Azerbaijan
- Inescapable Droughts, solo show, YARAT Studios, Baku, Azerbaijan
- 300 Word on Resistance, group exhibition, YARAT Centre, Baku, Azerbaijan
- Little Lies, group exhibition, YARAT Centre, Baku, Azerbaijan
- In This City of Bright Fires, group exhibition, ARTIM Project Space, Baku, Azerbaijan
- Prospect Off The Slope, solo show, ARTIM Project Space, Baku, Azerbaijan
- Secrets of The House, group show, ARTIM Project Space, Baku, Azerbaijan
- Comfortably Numb, group exhibition, ARTIM Project Space, Baku, Azerbaijan
- Traces of Time, Mingachevir State Art Gallery, Mingachevir, Azerbaijan
- This Too Shall Pass, solo show, ARTIM Project Space, Azerbaijan, Baku
- Nə var, odur, solo exhibition, YARAT Centre, Baku, Azerbaijan
- Dis Place, solo show, YARAT Centre, Baku, Azerbaijan
- YAY Gallery at Art Dubai Contemporary, 2016
- The Heart Is A Lonely Hunter, group exhibition, Baku, Azerbaijan

==== 2017 ====
- Dysphonia, group exhibition, ARTIM Project Space, Baku, Azerbaijan
- Molotov Gulab, solo exhibition, ARTIM Project Space, Baku, Azerbaijan
- Dear Beloved, solo exhibition, YARAT Centre, Baku, Azerbaijan
- ARTIM Lab: 100% Made in Azerbaijan, 24 hours group exhibition, ARTIM Project Space, Baku, Azerbaijan
- YARAT Residency: The Show Must Go On, group show, ARTIM Project Space, Baku, Azerbaijan
- Traces of Time, travelling exhibition, Gusar State Art Gallery, Gusar, Azerbaijan
- 1001 Nights, group exhibition, YAY Gallery, Baku, Azerbaijan
- ARTIM Lab: Who Cares, 1 day group exhibition, ARTIM Project Space, Baku, Azerbaijan
- Suns and Neons Above Kazakhstan, group show, YARAT Centre, Baku, Azerbaijan
- Boys Don't Cry, group exhibition, ARTIM Project Space, Baku, Azerbaijan
- YARAT Residency: Imaginary Strangers, group exhibition, ARTIM Project Space, Baku, Azerbaijan
- Traces of Time, travelling exhibition, Sumqayit State Art Gallery, Sumqayit, Azerbaijan
- Far Horizons, group exhibition, ARTIM Project Space, Baku, Azerbaijan
- ARTIM Lab: Zero, 24 hours group exhibition, ARTIM Project Space, Baku, Azerbaijan
- Neither War, Nor Peace, group exhibition, ARTIM Project Space, Baku, Azerbaijan
- ALL_AND, solo exhibition, YAY Gallery, Baku, Azerbaijan
- Traces of Time, Yardimly State Art Gallery, Yardimly, Azerbaijan
- Crumbling Down, Up And Up We Climb, group show, YARAT Centre, Baku, Azerbaijan
- ARTIM Lab: Monumental, 24 hours exhibition, ARTIM Project Space, Baku, Azerbaijan

==== 2018 ====
- Nurcan, solo show, ARTIM Project Space, Baku, Azerbaijan
- Not My Fate, solo show, ARTIM Project Space, Baku, Azerbaijan
- Think That Everything That Exists, Does Not Exist, group show, YAY Gallery, Baku, Azerbaijan
- Non-Imagined Perspectives, solo show, YARAT Centre, Baku, Azerbaijan
- Do It, solo show, YARAT Centre, Baku, Azerbaijan
- YARAT Residency: Unthought Known, ARTIM Project Space, Baku, Azerbaijan
- ARTIM Lab: Neuroimaging, 24 hours exhibition, ARTIM Project Space, Baku, Azerbaijan
- Labour, Leisure and Dreams: 1960's Through The Eyes of Azerbaijani Masters, group exhibition, Museum of Azerbaijani Painting of the XX-XXI Centuries
- Məhəllə, group exhibition, ARTIM Project Space, Baku, Azerbaijan
- ARTIM Lab: Mapping The Intangible, 24 hours exhibition, ARTIM Project Space, Baku, Azerbaijan
- For, In Your Tongue, I Can Not Fit, solo show, YARAT Centre, Baku, Azerbaijan
- YARAT Residency: Sick Love Nature, group exhibition, ARTIM Project Space, Baku, Azerbaijan
- Once Again That Garden Be, travelling exhibition, Gazakh State Art Gallery, Gazakh, Azerbaijan
- Full Emptiness: Virtual Reality, art exhibition, ARTIM Project Space, Baku, Azerbaijan
- ARTIM Rooms: New Tales, group exhibition, ARTIM Project Space, Baku, Azerbaijan
- Structure. Function. Change, group exhibition, YAY Gallery, Baku, Azerbaijan
- Sleipnir, solo show, YARAT Centre, Baku, Azerbaijan
- Shy Boy of The Pink Future, solo show, ARTIM Project Space, Baku, Azerbaijan
- Starry Skies, travelling exhibition, Shamkir Youth Center, Shamkir, Azerbaijan
- Flies Bite It's Going To Rain, solo show, YARAT Centre, Baku, Azerbaijan
- YARAT Residency: Boundary Layers, group exhibition, ARTIM Project Space, Baku, Azerbaijan

==== 2019 ====
- De/Construction: Santa Claus In The Remote Villages, photo exhibition
- ARTIM Rooms: Perpendicular Truths, group exhibition, ARTIM Project Space, Old City, Baku, Azerbaijan
- The Intimate Beauty, solo exhibition, YAY Gallery, Old City, Baku, Azerbaijan
- ZARAtustra, solo show, YARAT Centre, Baku, Azerbaijan
- ARTIM Lab: Experience. Thoughts. Conclusion, graduation exhibition, ARTIM Project Space, Baku, Azerbaijan
- Once Again That Garden Be, travelling exhibition, Gakh State Art Gallery, Gakh, Azerbaijan
- Love and Protest, retrospective exhibition, Museum of Azerbaijani Painting of the XX-XXI Centuries, Baku, Azerbaijan
- YARAT Residency: On The Tip of Other Tongues, group exhibition, ARTIM Project Space, Baku, Azerbaijan
- ARTIM Lab: Ruh Ruh, exhibition, YARAT Studios, Baku, Azerbaijan
- Dadash Adna: Love Me, multidisciplinary exhibition, ARTIM Project Space, Baku, Azerbaijan
- Once Again That Garden Be, travelling exhibition, Mahsati Ganjavi Cultural Center, Ganja, Azerbaijan
- Magohalmi and The Echos of Creation, solo show, YARAT Centre, Baku, Azerbaijan
- Charivari, solo show, YARAT Centre, Baku, Azerbaijan
- YARAT Residency: Forget What You Know, See Who I Am, group exhibition, ARTIM Project Space, Baku, Azerbaijan
- ARTIM Flux: Peripheral Expansion, group exhibition, ARTIM Project Space, Baku, Azerbaijan
- Baku Speaking: 1900's – 1940's, Museum of Azerbaijani Painting of the XX-XXI Centuries, Baku, Azerbaijan
- Bifurcation, group exhibition, YARAT Studios, Baku, Azerbaijan
- Once Again That Garden Be, travelling exhibition, Mingachevir State Art Gallery, Mingachevir, Azerbaijan
- Fragile Frontiers – Visions on Iran's In/Visible Borders, group exhibition, YARAT Centre, Baku, Azerbaijan
- YARAT Residency: Experiential Time, group exhibition, ARTIM Project Space, Baku, Azerbaijan

==== 2020 ====
- Talk About Other Things, 1 day studio exhibition, ARTIM Project Space, Old City, Baku, Azerbaijan
- Drastic Measures, solo exhibition, ARTIM Project Space, Baku Azerbaijan
- Once Again That Garden Be, travelling exhibition, Khachmaz State Art Gallery, Khachmaz, Azerbaijan
- Virtual ARTIM, online group exhibition
- Qurban Olum, solo show, YARAT Centre, Baku, Azerbaijan
- No Poem Loves Its Poet, solo show, YARAT Centre, Baku, Azerbaijan
- Chrysalis: A Moment of Transformation, group show, ARTIM Project Space, Old City, Baku, Azerbaijan
- Make an Island For Yourself, group exhibition, Museum of Azerbaijani Painting of the XX-XXI Centuries, Baku, Azerbaijan
- Fogs Turned Into Epic Story in My Head, group show, YARAT Centre, Baku, Azerbaijan

==== 2025 ====
- International project by Ukrainian curator Kostyantyn Doroshenko " Me and the ark, me and the Great Flood”, with a modern interpretation of the philosophy of Nasimi, involving artists from Azerbaijan, Ukraine Georgia, Lithuania, Bosnia and Herzegovina and Czech Republic in the YARAT Contemporary Art Space, Baku.
