= Taus Makhacheva =

Russian artist based in Moscow (born 1983)

- Таус Махачева
- Born: Taus Makhacheva; August 14, 1983; Moscow, Soviet Union
- Education: Russian State University for the Humanities, London College of Communication, Goldsmiths College, The Institute of Contemporary Art, Moscow, Royal College of Art
- Notable work: Tsumikh (2023), Superhero Sighting Society (with Sabih Ahmed, 2019), Aerostatic Experience (2019), Charivari (2019), Quantitative Infinity of the Objective (2019), Baida (2017), Super Taus (Untitled II, 2016), Tightrope (2015), Gamsutl (2012), Space of Celebration (2009)

Taus Makhacheva (Russian: Таус Османовна Махачева, born August 14, 1983) is a contemporary artist from Russia. She creates works that explore the restless connections between historical narratives and fictions of cultural authenticity. Often humorous, her art considers the resilience of images, objects and bodies emerging out of stories and personal experiences. Her methodology involves reworking of materials, landscapes and monuments, pushing against walls, opening up ceilings and proliferating institutional spaces with a cacophony of voices.

== Family ==
Grandfather: Rasul Gamzatov - avar poet, prose writer, publicist, Soviet and Russian public and political figure, translator, the Laureate Stalin and Lenin Prizes, People's Poet of Dagestan ASSR, Hero of Socialist Labor (1923-2003).

Grandmother: Patimat Gamzatova - Head of the Dagestan Museum of Fine Arts (1964-2000).

Mother: Patimat Gamzatova - art historian, Сorresponding Member of the Russian Academy of Arts, Honored Culture Worker of Dagestan Republic.

Father: Osman Makhachev - Doctor of Medical Sciences, professor, Honored Doctor of the Russian Federation.

== Education ==
- 2011-2013 – MA Fine Art, Royal College of Art, London
- 2008-2009 – New Strategies in Contemporary Art, The Institute of Contemporary Art, Moscow
- 2003-2007 – BA (Hons) Fine Art (Studio Practice & Contemporary Critical Studies), Goldsmiths College, University of London, London
- 2002-2003 – Foundation Diploma in Photography, London College of Communication, London
- 2000-2005 Russian State University for the Humanities, World Economy, Moscow

== Selected collections ==
- Art Gallery of Ontario, Ontario
- Centre Pompidou, Paris
- Galerie für Zeitgenössische Kunst Leipzig
- Gazprombank, Moscow
- Kadist Art Foundation, Paris, San Francisco
- Los Angeles County Museum of Art, Los Angeles
- Louis Vuitton Foundation, Paris
- Moscow Museum of Modern Art, Moscow
- Museum of Modern Art, Antwerp
- Musée cantonal des Beaux-Arts, Lausanne
- National Centre for Contemporary Arts, Moscow
- Pushkin Museum, Moscow
- P. S. Gamzatova Dagestan Museum of Fine Arts, Makhachkala
- Sharjah Art Foundation, Sharjah
- Tate Modern, London
- Tretyakov Gallery, Moscow
- Uppsala Konstmuseum, Uppsala
- Van Abbemuseum, Eindhoven
- Vehbi Koç Foundation, Istanbul
- Videoinsight Foundation, Turin
- YARAT Contemporary Art Space, Baku

== Prizes ==
- 2021 Kandinsky Prize, Media Art, shortlisted, Moscow
- 2021 Art Here 2021 Richard Mille Art Prize. Memory, Time, Territory, Abu Dhabi Louvre, shortlisted, Abu Dhabi
- 2019 Future Generation Art Prize, shortlisted, Victor Pinchuk Foundation, Kyiv
- 2018 Cosmoscow 2018, Artist of the Year, Cosmoscow Foundation for Contemporary Art, winner, Moscow
- 2016 Kandinsky Prize, Young Artist, Project of the year, winner, Moscow (as Super Taus)
- 2015 VI Moscow Biennale of Contemporary Art Prize, winner, Moscow
- 2013 Future of Europe, winner, (GfZK) Galerie für Zeitgenössische Kunst, Leipzig
- 2013 Innovation Prize, Regional Project, shortlisted, National Centre for Contemporary Art, Moscow
- 2012 Innovation Prize, New Generation, winner, National Centre for Contemporary Art, Moscow
- 2011 Kandinsky Prize, Media Art, shortlisted, Moscow

== Selected solo exhibitions ==
2022 — Space of Celebration, curated by Lucas Morin, Nora Razian, Jameel Arts Center, Dubai

2021 — It’s Possible to Raise the Ceiling a Bit, curated by Hanne Hagenaars, Fries Museum, Friesland

2020 — 4`224,92 cm’2 of Degas, сurated by Nicole Schweizer, Musée cantonal des Beaux-Arts, Lausanne

2020 — Hold Your Horses, curated by Helen Watson and Melissa Burntown, The Tetley, Leeds

2020 — Sturdy Black Shoes, curated by Edit Molnar and Marcel Schwierin, Edit Russ Haus für Medienkunst, Oldenburg

2019 — Superhero Sighting Society, conceived by Sabih Ahmed and Taus Makhacheva, KADIST Foundation, Paris

2019 — Charivari, curated by Suad Garayeva-Maleki, Yarat Contemporary Art Space, Baku

2019 — D’une pierre, une montagne, curated by Nicolas Audureau, LE CAP - Centre d'arts plastiques de Saint-Fons, Saint-Fons

2019 — The Strong Ones, curated by Lýdia Pribišová, Hit Gallery, Bratislava

2018 — Storeroom, curated by Christiane Berndes, Van Abbemuseum, Eindhoven

2018 — BaidÀ, narrative projects, London

2018 — Baida, Althuis Hofland Fine Arts, the Gemma, Amsterdam

2018 — Tightrope, curated by Rebecka Wigh Abrahamsson, Uppsala Konstmuseum, Uppsala

2017 — Cloud Caught on a Mountain, curated by Alexey Maslyaev, Moscow Museum of Modern Art, Moscow

2017 — Second World, Third Attempt, Leo Xu Projects, Shanghai

2015 — Vababai Vadadai!, narrative projects, London

2015 — (In)sidenotes, curated by Rebecka Wigh Abrahamsson, Uppsala Konstmuseum, Uppsala

2014 — Dagestan. Not for sale, curated by Alexey Maslyaev, artSumer, Istanbul

2014 — A Walk, A Dance, A Ritual, curated by Ilina Koralova, (GfZK) Galerie für Zeitgenössische Kunst, Leipzig

2013 — What? Whose? Why?, curated by Daria Kirsanova, Raf Projects, Tehran

2013 — Story Demands to be Continued, curated by Alexey Maslyaev, Republic of Dagestan Union of Artists Exhibition Hall, Makhachkala

2013 — On Historical Ideals of Labour in the Country that Conquered Space, curated by Carlos Noronha Feio, The Mews Project Space, London

2013 — The Process or Instance of Breaking Open, curated by Emmeli Person and Maria Kotlyachkova, Kalmar Konstmuseum, Kalmar

2012 — City States, Topography of Masculinity, curated by Irina Stark and Kelly Klifa, the 7th Liverpool Biennial, LJMU Copperas Hill Building, Liverpool

2012 — Let Me Be Part of A Narrative, curated by Alexey Maslyaev, Paperworks Gallery, Winzavod, Moscow

2011 — Affirmative Action (mimesis), curated by Marco Scotini, Laura Bulian Gallery, Milan

2010 — Affirmative Actions, curated by Alexey Maslyaev, Panopticon Inutero, Moscow

2009 — A Space of Celebration, Pervaya Gallery, Makhachkala, Dagestan

== Selected group exhibitions ==
2024

Diriyah Contemporary Art Biennale, curated by Ute Meta Bauer, Riyadh

Wunderkammer to Come: From the Uncompleted, a Beginning, curated by Yoko Nose, Toyota Municipal Museum of Art, Japan

Perhaps Here, curated by Tarek Abu El Fetouh, Sharjah Art Foundation, Sharjah

2023

14th Gwangju Biennale, curated by Sook-Kyung Lee, Gwangju

the only constant, curated by Maya Allison, NYUAD ART Gallery, Abu Dhabi

After Laughter Comes Tears, curated by Joel Valabrega, MUDAM, Luxembourg

Not My Circus, Not My Monkeys, curated by Helen Hirsch and Katrin Sperry, Kunstmuseum Thun, Thun

2022

In the heart of another country, curated by Dr Omar Kholeif, Contemporary Art of Deichtorhallen Hamburg, Hamburg

I'm Stepping High, I'm Drifting, and There I Go Leaping, curated by Weng Xiaoyu, Xiao Museum of Contemporary Art, Shandong

The Circus We Are, curated by Joanna De Vos, Namur, Four locations in Namur - Le Delta, musée Félicien Rops, Musée des Arts Anciens, Belgian Gallery, Namur

Hurting and healing. Let's imagine a different heritage, curated by Charles Esche, Tensta Konsthall, Stockholm

Migrations in Art – the Art of Migrations, curated by Danilo Vuksanović, Jelena Ognjanović and Luka Kulić, Novi Sad

Moving Woman, curated by Maria Lind, Smena, Kazan

2021

Biennial of Difficult Heritage, curated by Anton Valkovsky, Volgograd

One Point Five, curated by Stefanie Böttcher, Kunsthalle Mainz, Mainz

Hands, curated by Madhursee Dutta and Ala Younis, Akademie der Künste der Welt, Köln

Metamorphosis and Time of Mourning, curated by Daniela, Linda Dostálková, PLATO Ostrava, Ostrava

2020

Afterglow, Yokohama Triennale, curated by Raqs Media Collective, Yokohama

Lahore Biennale 02: Between the Sun and the Moon, curated by Sheikha Hoor Al-Qasimi, Lahore

2019

Cosmopolis #2: Rethinking the Human, curated by Kathryn Weir with associate Cosmopolis curator Ilaria Conti in collaboration with associate curators Charléne Dinhut and Zhang Hanlu, Centre Pompidou, Paris

New Archive of Limited Edition Art (NATI), Shaltai editions exhibition, сurated by Irina Gorlova and Antonio Geusa, Tretyakov Gallery, Moscow

Somewhere in Between, curated by Ulrika Flink, Boras Konstmuseum, Boras

Art Encounters Biennial, curated by Maria Lind and Anca Rujoiu, Timișoara

Where Water Comes Together with Other Water, curated by Adélaïde Blanc, Daria de Beauvais, Yoann Gourmel, Mat-thieu Lelièvre, Vittoria Matarrese, Claire Moulène, Hugo Vitrani, 15th Lyon Contemporary Art Biennale, Fagor Factory, macLYON, Lyon Museum of Contemporary Art, Lyon

The Life of Things, curated by Maria Wills Londono in collaboration with Audrey Genois and Maude Johnson,16th MOMENTA Biennale de l’image, Galerie de l'UQAM, Montreal, Quebec

Happiness is Born in the Guts, curated by Jagna Domżalska, Galeria Miejska Arsenal, Poznan

The Art of Being Good, curated by Siim Preiman, Tallinn Art Hall, Tallinn

After Leaving | Before Arriving, curated by Elisabeth Del Prete, Daniel Milnes, Lýdia Pribišová, Neringa Stoškutė and Alessandra Troncone, 12th Kaunas Biennial, M. K. Čiurlionis National Museum of Art, Kaunas

Future Generation Art Prize, curated by Björn Geldhof and Tatiana Kochubinska, 58th International Art Exhibition - La Biennale di Venezia, collateral event, Palazzo Ca’ Tron, Venice, Pinchuk Art Centre, Kyiv

The Keeper; To Have And To Hold, curated by Emer McGarry, The Model, Sligo

2018

Punk Orientalism, curated by Sara Raza, MacKenzie Art Gallery, Regina, Saskatchewan

Rituals of Signs and Metamorphosis, curated by Tarek Abou El Fetouh, Red Brick Art Museum, Beijing

Tomorrow Will Be Yesterday, curated by Andrey Misiano, ERTY gallery, Tbilisi

Alter Heroes Coalition, curated by Daria Khan, Mimosa House, London (as Super Taus)

Supernature in Two Parts: Part I, curated by Daria Khan and Mimosa House, Lisson Gallery, London (as Super Taus)

The Border, curated by Inke Arns and Thibaut de Ruyter, Goethe Institute at the Museum and Exhibition Complex of the Russian Academy of Arts, Ekaterinburg, Almaty and Tashkent

Beautiful World, Where Are You?, curated by Kitty Scott and Sally Tallant, 10th Liverpool Biennial, Liverpool

Transformatio. Contemporary Art of Dagestan, curated by Maria Filatova, Mardjani Foundation, Erarta Museum, Saint Petersburg

One Place After Another, curated by Viktor Misiano and Anna Zhurba, session IV of Viktor Misiano's "The Human Condition", Jewish Museum and Tolerance Centre, Moscow

The Planetary Garden. Cultivating Coexistence, curated by Bregje van der Haak, Andrés Jaque, Ippolito Pestellini Laparelli, Mirjam Varadinis, Manifesta 12, Palermo

Starting From the Desert, curated by Marco Scotini, 2nd Yinchuan Biennale, Museum of Contemporary Art Yinchuan, Yinchuan

Everything Was Forever, Until It Was No More, curated by Katerina Gregos,1st Riga International Biennial of Contemporary Art, Riga

Soon Enough, Art in Action, curated by Maria Lind, Tensta Konsthall, Stockholm

2017

Life from My Window, curated by Andrey Misiano, Laura Bulian gallery, Milan

New Literacy, curated by Joao Ribas, 4 Ural Industrial Biennial, Ekaterinburg

The Travellers: Voyage and Migration in New Art from Central and Eastern Europe, curated by Magdalena Moskalewicz, Kumu Art Museum, Tallinn

The Border, curated by Inke Arns and Thibaut de Ruyter, Goethe Institute at Ioseb Grishashvili Tbilisi History Museum (Karvasla), Tbilisi

How To Live Together, curated by Nicolaus Schafhausen, Kunsthalle Wien, Vienna

Viva Arte Viva, curated by Christine Macel, 57th International Art Exhibition, La Biennale di Venezia, Venice

Space Force Construction, curated by Matthew Witkovsky, Richard and Ellen Sandor (Art Institute Chicago), Katerina Chuchalina with Anna Ilchenko (V-A-C Foundation), Peter Taub, Palazzo delle Zattere, Venice

1st Garage Triennial of Russian Contemporary Art, curated by Kate Fowle, Katya Inozemtseva, Snejana Krasteva, Andrey Misiano, Ilmira Bolotyan, Sasha Obukhova, Tatiana Volkova, Garage Museum of Contemporary Art, Moscow

The Border, curated by Inke Arns and Thibaut de Ruyter, Goethe Institute, Moscow, St. Petersburg, Krasnoyarsk, Kiev, Minsk, Dortmund

2016

The Withdrawal of the Red Army, curated by Ivan Galuzin and Lise Dahl, Northern Norway Art Museum, Blaker Old Dairy, Oslo

Why Won't We Ask Again? Arguments, Counter-arguments and Stories, curated by Raqs Media Collective, 11th Shanghai Biennale, Power Station of Art, Shanghai

Social Calligraphies, curated by Magda Kardasz, Zachęta National Gallery, Warsaw

Millennials, curated by Mirjam Westen, Museum Arnhem, Arnhem

Performing the Landscape, curated by Lorenzo Fusi, TRUCK Contemporary Art, Calgary

VII Permanent Collection Display Interaction: Contemporary Artists Respond to MMOMA Collection, curated by Elena Yaichnikova, MMOMA, Moscow

The Travellers, curated by Magdalena Moskalewicz, Zachęta National Gallery, Warsaw

Museum ON/OFF, curated by Alicia Knock, Centre Pompidou, Paris

But Still Tomorrow Builds into My Face, curated by Nat Muller, Lawrie Shabibi gallery, Dubai

Lost in the Archive, curated by Inga Lace and Andra Silapetere, Exhibition hall Riga Art Space, Riga

Baroque, Galerie Fons Welter, Amsterdam

minus20degree Art & Architecture Winter Biennale, curated by Theo Deutinger and Heinz Riegler, minus20degree art and architecture biennale, Flachau, Austria.

2015

Otwock, Season 5: Silvohortiaromatherapy, curated by Kasia Redzis and Magda Materna, Otwock, held by Open Art Projects and Polish artist Mirosław Bałka, Muzeum Ziemi Otwockiej (Museum of the Otwock Land), Otwock

How to Gather? Acting in a Center in a City in the Heart of the island of Eurasia, curated by Bart De Baere, Defne Ayas and Nicolaus Schafhausen, 6th Moscow Biennale of Contemporary Art, VDNH, Moscow

The School of Kyiv, Kyiv Biennial, curated by Hedwig Saxenhuber and Georg Schollhammer, Visual Culture Research Center, Kyiv

Too Early, Too Late. Middle East and Modernity, curated by Marco Scotini, Pinacoteca Nazionale di Bologna, Bologna

2014

Russian Performance: a Cartography of its History, curated by Yulia Aksenova and Sasha Obukhova, Garage Museum of Contemporary Art, Moscow

Untitled... (Native Foreigners), curated by Andrey Misiano, Garage Museum of Contemporary Art, Moscow

An Opera of Labour and Revolution, curated by Lanfranco Aceti and Susanne Jaschko, Kasa Gallery, Istanbul

Close and Far: Russian Photography Now, curated by Kate Bush, Calvert 22, London

So Long, and Thanks for All the Fish, Lawrie Shabibi, Dubai

Sergey Parajanov. The Color of Pomegranate, сurated by Zaven Sargsyan, Vyacheslav Shmyrov, Katya Bochavar and Daria Khan, GROUND Solyanka Gallery, Моscow

2013

Spaces of Exception, curated by Elena Sorokina and Jelle Bouwhuis, 5th Moscow Biennale of Contemporary Art, special project, ARTPLAY Design Center, Moscow

Nostalgia Nervosa, curated by Iliana Fokianaki, State of Concept, Athens

Sensible Action, curated by Beral Madra, Alanika 2013, National Museum of Republic Northern Ossetia-Alania, Vladikavkaz

No Water Tomorrow, curated by Alexey Maslyaev, Moscow Museum of Modern Art, Moscow

Love me, Love me not, curated by Dina Nasser-Khadivi, 55th International Art Exhibition - La Biennale di Venezia, collateral event, Venice

The Enchanted Wanderer, curated by Andrey Misiano, Chukotka Heritage Museum Center, Anadyr

Re:emerge, Towards a New Cultural Cartography, curated by Yuko Hasegawa, 11th Sharjah Biennial, Sharjah

Looks Like Torture, curated by Nicholas Cohn and Amy Kisch, HERE Art Center, New York

Take a Look at Yourself, Who Do You Think You Are?, curated by Andrey Parshikov, Victoria Gallery, Samara

2012

I am who I am, curated by Olga Sviblova, Kunst im Tunnel, Dusseldorf, Germany

Quarantania, curated by David Thorp, Enclave, London

Animal Style, curated by Ilya Shipilovskikh, National Centre for Contemporary Arts, Ekaterinburg

Happiness is a Warm Gun, curated by Ekaterina Shadkovska, Rizzordi Art Foundation, Loft Raf, Saint Petersburg

Quarantania, curated by David Thorp, John Hansard Gallery, Southampton

Joyful Archipelago, curated by Olga Grotova, Guest Projects, London

Now&Then, Victoria Gallery, Samara

Migrasophia, curated by Sara Raza, Maraya Contemporary Art Centre, Sharjah

Génération P, Town Hall, Le Kremlin-Bicêtre

2011

Rewriting Worlds, curated by Peter Weibel, 4th Moscow Biennale of Contemporary Art, ARTPLAY Design Center, Moscow

Expanded Cinema, curated by Olga Shishko, XII Media Forum of 33rd Moscow International Film Festival, Moscow Museum of Modern Art, Moscow

Get Up and Run Away With It – About Love and the Impossible, curated by Nadine Wietlisbach, Palais Bleu Le-Lie, Trogen

Greater Caucasus, curated by Irina Yashkova, PERMM Museum of Contemporary Art, Perm, Russia

North Caucasian Biennale, curated by Djamilia Dagirova, Pervaya Gallery, Makhachkala

Practice for Everyday Life, curated by David Thorp, Calvert 22, London

2010

History of Russian Video Art, Volume 3, curated by Antonio Geusa, Moscow Museum of Modern Art, Moscow

Zones of Alienation, curated by Marina Fomenko, LOT gallery, Lexington

Intimate Capital, curated by Andrey Parshikov and Alena Lapina, 2nd Moscow International Biennale for Young Art “Stop! Who goes there?”, Proekt Fabrika, Moscow

2009

Aluminium, curated by Leyla Akhundzadeh, 4th International Biennale of Contemporary Art, Baku

Let Me Think!, curated by Stanislav Shuripa, the Parallel Program of the 3rd Moscow Biennale of Contemporary Art, Red October, Moscow

Really?, curated by Aleksandr Sokolov, the Parallel Program of the 3rd Moscow Biennale of Contemporary Art, Artplay, Moscow

Topography of Happiness: Russian Wedding from the 19th to the 21st Centuries, curated by Olga Sosnina, Tsaritsyno State Museum, Moscow

We Will Take the Lead From Now On, curated by Arseniy Zhilyaev and Maria Chekhonadskih, Voronezh Center for Contemporary Art, Voronezh

2008

Migration, curated by Daria Kamyshnikova, 1st Moscow International Biennale for Young Art “Stop! Who goes there?”, Moscow Museum of Modern Art, Moscow

I Am Nature, curated by Stanislav Shuripa, 1st Moscow International Biennale for Young Art “Stop! Who goes there?”, Contemporary City Foundation, Moscow

Documenting Possibilities, curated by Stanislav Shuripa, Valand School of Fine Art, Gothenburg

2006

Caucasica, curated by Giancarlo Vianello, Scuola Grande di S.Giovanni Evangelista, Venice

XII INTERBIFER International Biennale of Portrait, Drawings and Graphics 06, Tuzla

== Residencies ==
- 2019 Kadist Foundation, Paris
- 2018 SAM Art Project, Paris
- 2018 Aki Aora, Tulum
- 2016 Civitella Ranieri, Umbertide
- 2015-2016 Jan Van Eyck Academie, Maastricht
- 2015 Delfina Foundation, London
- 2013 Alanica, Art Symposium, Vladikavkaz

== Academic сareer ==
=== Artist talks ===
- 2022 Open meeting with Taus Makhacheva, as part of the Family Ethnography course by Elmira Kakabaeva
- 2022 Artist talk at M HKA, Antwerpen
- 2022 Virtual Class Visit, Princeton University
- 2022 Artist talk at Tselinny Center, Astana
- 2022 In Conversation: Taus Makhacheva and Madina Tlostanova, Jameel Arts Center
- 2022 Art Space SKLAD, online, Sukhumi
- 2021 Territory Festival, MMOMA, Moscow
- 2021 Fries Museum, Leeuwarden
- 2021 Blazar young art fair, Moscow
- 2021 Masters & Nova Art, online, Saint Petersburg
- 2021 The Tetley, online, Leeds
- 2020 British Higher School of Art & Design, Moscow
- 2020 School of Fine Art, History of Art and Cultural Studies, University of Leeds, Leeds
- 2019 LOOP Talks 2019, Barcelona
- 2018 Liverpool Biennial, Liverpool
- 2017 In - conversation with Andrey Kovalev, Garage Education Center, Moscow
- 2017 Talk for the members of the C-MAP Central and Eastern European group, Garage, Moscow
- 2016 Goldsmiths, London
- 2016 Open Studios, MMOMA, Moscow
- 2015 In - conversation with curator Kasia Redzisz, Institute of Contemporary Arts, London
- 2013 Yarat Contemporary Art Space, The International Mugham Center, Baku
- 2013 At the Crossroads: Conversation with Taus Makhacheva, Contemporary art from Caucasus, Sotheby’s, London
- 2012 Calvert22
- 2012 In - conversation with Sara Raza, Cultural Representations, Migrasophia, Maraya Contemporary Art Centre, American University of Sharjah, Sharjah
- 2011 British Higher School of Art & Design, Moscow

=== Invited guest lectures and studio visits ===
- 2022 Online program Possibilities and methods in international career, CEC ArtsLink
- 2022 Tashkeel Guest Mentoring as a part of Critical Practice Programme 2022
- 2021 Guest lecture and studio visit at St.Joost School of Art and Design
- 2021 Art and practices of hospitality, Vyksa
- 2021 Territory Festival, Moscow
- 2020 ICA Moscow (Institute of Contemporary Art)
- 2020 The Studio Visit, educational project, Worldwide online
- 2011- 2021 British Higher School of Art & Design, Moscow
- 2021 Fries Museum, Leeuwarden
- 2018 Liverpool Biennial, Liverpool
- 2012 Calvert 22

=== Lectures and teaching ===
- 2011- 2021 British Higher School of Art & Design, Moscow
- 2016 - 2017 Russian Institute of Theatre Arts – GITIS, Moscow
- 2014 The Art Department of Dagestan State Pedagogical University, Makhachkala
- 2013 Dagestan Art School n.a. M.A.Djemal, Makhachkala
- 2009 Moscow State University (elective course on the History of Performance)
- 2009 Pervaya Gallery, Makhachkala—Kaspiysk

=== Performative lectures ===
- 2019 The Superhero Summit, produced by KADIST in collaboration with ‘Cosmopolis #2: rethinking the human’, Paris
- 2017 Field Meeting Take 5: Thinking Projects - "Microbeads", curator Leeza Ahmady, Asia Contemporary Art Week, Asia Society Museum & SVA Theatre, New York
- 2015 3rd Garage international conference: "Where is the line between us?: Cautionary tales from now", Garage, Moscow (Super Taus)

=== Panel discussions ===
- 2022 Uzbekistan National Pavilion sessions ‘Decolonizing Data On the Myth of Machine Objectivity’
- 2018 The artist: What We Are Made Of, Cosmoscow, Moscow
- 2017 Contemporary art and contemporary art science, HSE University, Art and Design, Moscow
- 2015 Reaching out: (Beyond) the Caucasus, ArtBasel, Hong Kong
- 2014 Close and Far, Calvert22, The Courtauld Institute of Art, London
- 2011 Art schools: how to become an avant-garde artist, XV Art - Moscow International Contemporary Art Fair, Moscow

=== Workshops ===
- 2022 Space of celebration, Super Taus workshop for children, Jameel Arts Centre
- 2021 Territory Festival, Moscow
- 2018 Soon Enough, art in action, Super Taus workshop for children, Tensta konsthall, Stockholm
- 2017 The Garage Triennial of Russian Contemporary Art, Garage Atrium, Moscow (Super Taus)
- 2012 South London Gallery, London

=== Conferences ===
- 2022 Tate and Institut National d’histoire de l’art (INHA) conference, Paris
- 2021 Art and practices of hospitality, Vyksa
- 2019 The Superhero Summit, produced by KADIST in collaboration with ‘Cosmopolis #2: rethinking the human’, Paris
- 2014 Beyond Moscow, Glocal art scene in Dagestan, NCCA, Moscow
- 2013 Performative aspects of masculinity, Makhachkala City Museum, Makhachkala

== Publications ==
- Raza, Sara. Punk Orientalism: The Art of Rebellion. Dog Press, 2022
- Dekker, Elsbeth; Schweige, Robbie. Beginning in the Middle. Jap Sam Books, 2022
- Phaidon Editors. Prime - Art’s Next Generation, Phaidon Press, 2022
- Tlostanova, Madina. Decoloniality of being, knowledge and feeling, Tselinnii, 2020
- Schweizer, Nicole; Z. Rizvi Uzma, van Velsen, Vincent ed, Taus Makhacheva. 4`224,92 cm’2 of Degas, Fondation du Musée cantonal des Beaux-Arts, 2020
- Burrows, Dani, Cezar Aaron ed. Politics of Food, co-published by Delfina Foundation and Sternberg Press, 2019
- Kholeif, Omar. The Artists Who Will Change the World, Thames and Hudson, 2018
- Makhacheva, Taus. Tightrope, V-A-C Press, Mousse Publishing, 2017
- Makhacheva, Taus. Types du Caucase. Onestar Press, 2014
- Makhacheva, Taus; Maslyaev, Alexey ed. Story Demands to Be Continued. Self-published, 2013
- Amirsadeghi, Hossein; Vickery, Joanna ed. Frozen Dreams: Contemporary Art from Russia, Thames and Hudson, 2011

== Interviews ==
- Artist of the Week: Taus Makhacheva, as a part of HANDS exhibition, Akademie der Kuenste der Welt, 2021
- Interview with Taus Makhacheva, Part 5, Edith-Russ-Haus for Media Art, 2021
- Interview by Masha Komarova, Glavstroy, 2021
- Taus Makhacheva: My doubts became part of my method, Russian Art Focus, 2021
- Taus Makhacheva: Hold Your Horses at The Tetley, The Tetly, 2020
- Superhero Sighting Society, Kadist, Paris, 2019
- Beauty School: a conversation with Taus Makhacheva, Art in America, 2018
- The Art Newspaper Russia, 2018.08
- The Art Newspaper Russia, Taus Makhacheva: art as a balancing act, 2018.07
- Artists talk: Taus Makhacheva and Evgeny Antufiev, Harper’s Bazaar, 2016
- Art Guide, 2015

== Articles ==
- Wynants, Jean-Marie. The Circus we are à Namur. Les acrobaties de l'art, Le Soir, August 2022
- Bidshahri, Yalda. Taus Makhacheva`s “A Space of Celebration”. ArtAsiaPacific, June 2022
- Duplat, Guy. Bienvenue dans le grand cirque de la vie, La libre Belgique. May 2022
- The artists. Taus Makhacheva. Daily Canvas. The Richard Mille Special Issue.
- Sinha, Vamika. Art from the Fault Lines. Canvas, May–June, 2022
- Dekker, Elsbeth; Schweiger, Robbie. Beginning in the middle. Mister Motley, April 2022
- Beredian, Razmig. Russian artist Taus Makhacheva entwines the real with reveries in solo Dubai show. The National, March 2022
- Ex, Nicole. Taus Makhacheva. See All This Art Magazine, No. 20, 2020/2021
- Schellenberg, Samuel. Taus Makhacheva. Remodelage. Le courrier, March 2020
- House, Arthur. Bread and Soviet circuses – a letter from Baku. Taus Makhacheva, Charivari’ installation, October 2019
- Serafinowicz, Sylwia. Taus Makhacheva. narrative projects. ArtForum, December 2018
- Verhagen, Marcus. Taus Makhacheva. BaidÀ. narrative projects. Art Monthly, November 2018
- Jeffreys, Tom. In Search of the Ridiculous: Taus Makhacheva’s Performative Follies. Frieze, 7 October 2018
- Sutton, Kate. Taus Makhacheva. Openings. ArtForum, February 2016
- Ahmady, Leeza. From Central Asia to the Caucasus. In conversation with Taus Makhacheva. Ibraaz, March 2015
- Pertenava, Lali. Taus Makhacheva. ArtForum, February 2014
- Bailey, Stephanie. Her Dagestan. ArtAsiaPacific No.87, 2014
- Laia, Joao. Taus Makhacheva. Frieze magazine No.160, 2014
- Tolstova, Anna. Continuation of heart and hand. Taus Makhacheva in Makhachkala. Kommersant No.187(5218), 2013
- Avdeev, Maxim. One day with Taus Makhacheva, Art Chronika No. 4, 2012
- Scotini, Marco. Strategies of Camouflage. Taus Makhacheva’s actions. ArteCritica No.67, 2011
- Chekhonadskikh, Maria. Shots into the Sand by Taus Makhacheva. Moscow Art Magazine No.81, 2010
- Gamzatova, Patimat. Karakul by Taus Makhacheva. ANTENNAE No.4, 2007

== Links ==
- Vimeo channel
