= Minus20degree =

Art exhibit

minus20degree (abbreviated to m20d) is a contemporary art and architecture exhibition that takes place every 2 years in Flachau, Austria during winter. The exhibition lasts for 3 days in January. The biennale was founded by Theo Deutinger, Stefanos Filippas, Ana Rita Marques, Eliza Mante, and Heinz Riegler.

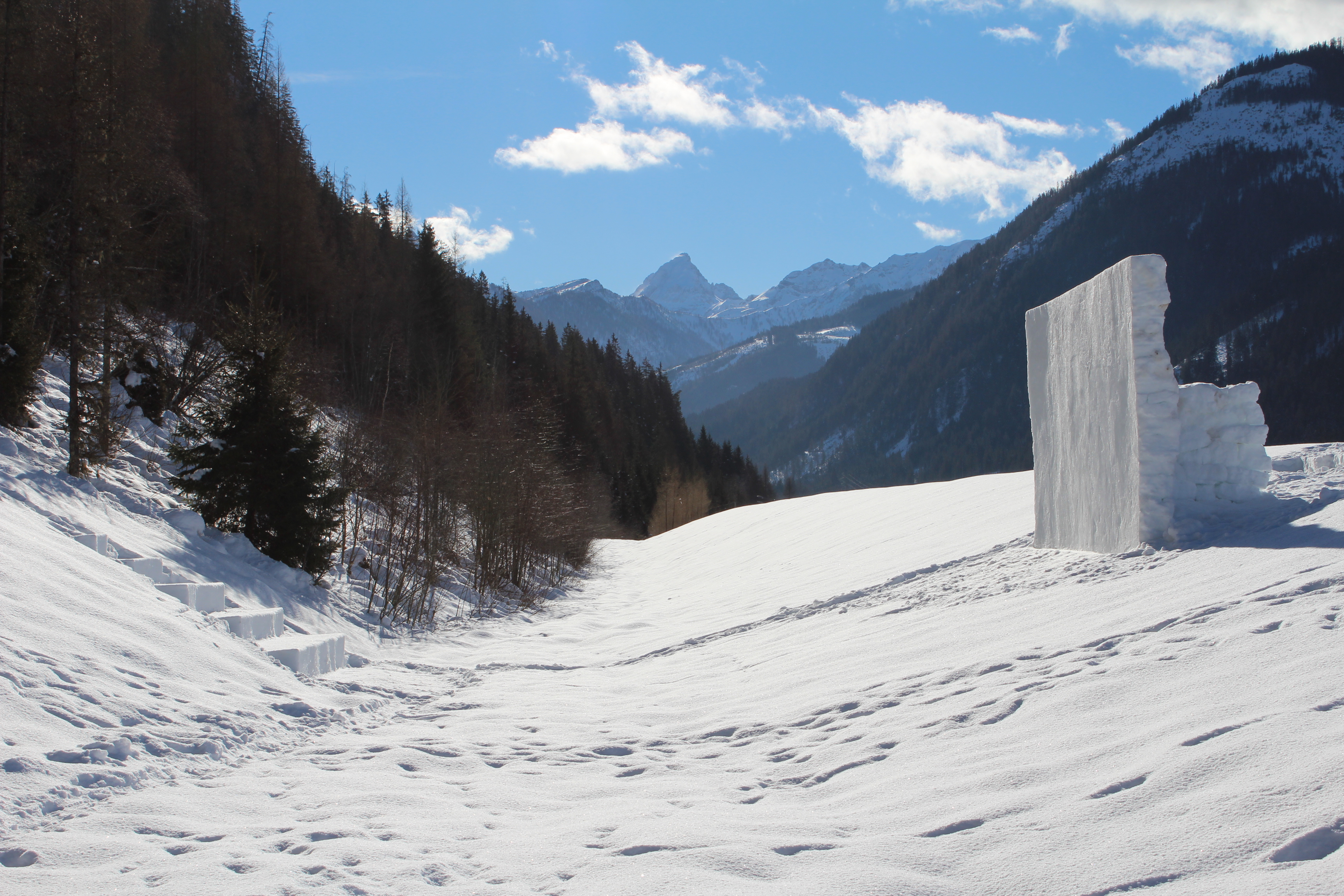
Snow Cinema for Helga Fanderl's Film Auf Schnee of minus20degree 2022. The screen measured approximately 3 by 5 meters.

The art biennale has consistently invited artists from around the world, and each edition is thematically defined. Artists are invited by the curators of the exhibition, or (since 2016) selected from an open call by a jury. m20d began as an informal presentation of art films projected onto a screen made from snow. Since then it has organically grown into the art biennale that it is today. Artworks are mostly, if not entirely site specific, and are made especially for the art biennale. Artists must confront the challenges and opportunities presented by the winter landscape of Flachau (and its surroundings), making use of the snow and winter environment to inform their artworks. Due to being in public space, the audience includes people who have travelled for the exhibition, as well as locals of the village, and tourists who are on ski vacations.

Earlier editions of the exhibition have presented respected contemporary artists such as Tetsuya Umeda, and Anna Vasof. The most recent edition of minus20degree featured renowned artists such as Roman Signer (who presented in documenta 8, the venice biennale, and the Skulptur Projekte Munster) and Helga Fanderl, who for the first time in m20d projected onto the snow screen of the exhibition with analogue 16mm film.

== Etymology of minus20degree ==
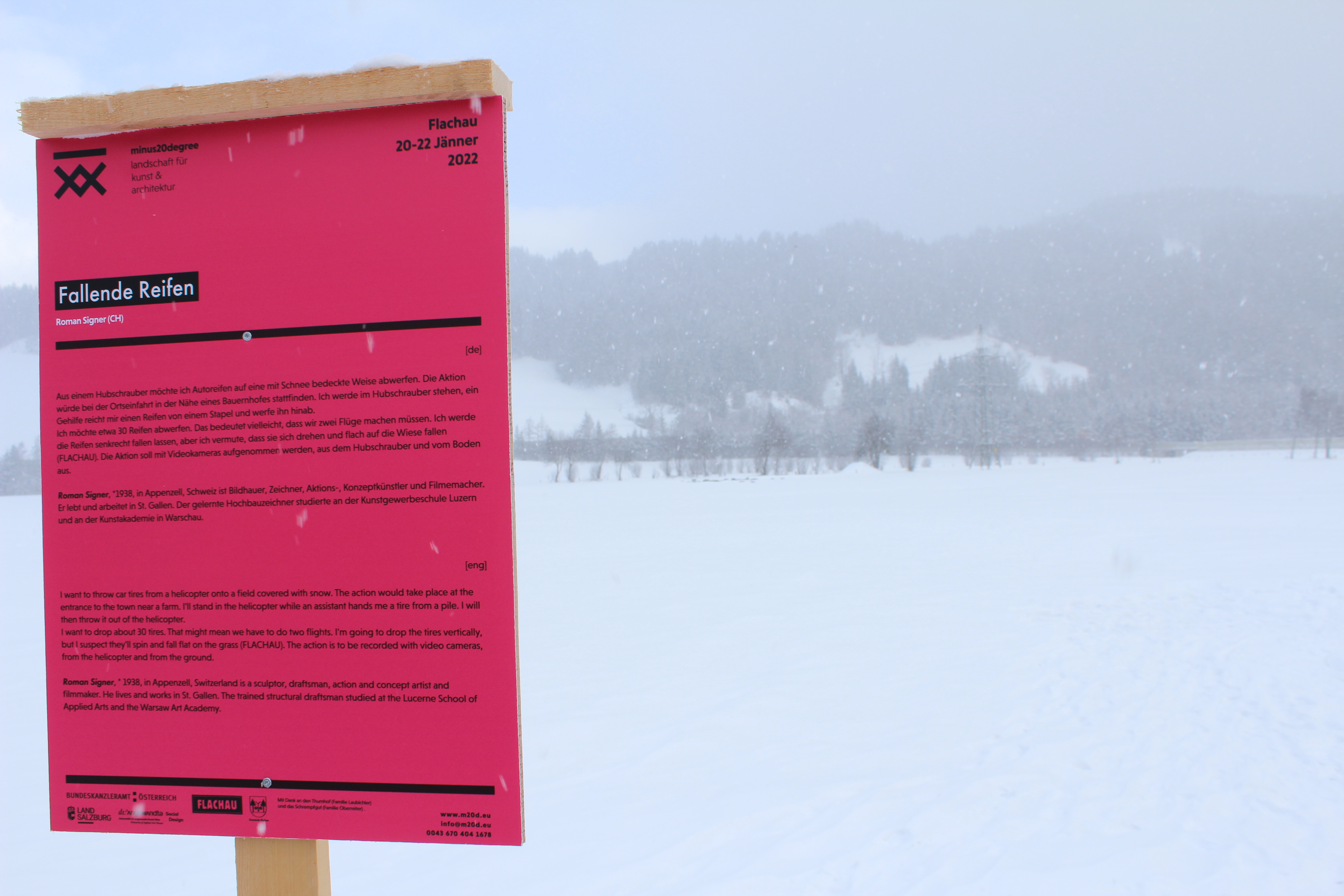
In the foreground is the pink didactic panel of minus20degree 2022 describing Roman Signer's Fallende Reifen artwork, which can be seen in the background, in German and English

minus20degree gains its name from the outdoor minimum temperature of its first edition in 2012, -20 degrees Celsius. The intention of the exhibition is to display works of art and architecture in the landscape and public space of Flachau during winter season. The snow affords a 'white box' effect similar to that of a standard museum experience. The exhibition has made use of various logos throughout each edition, but is typographically always consistent as lower case letters, written together as one word. Set in Austria, the presentation is bilingual, being in both German and English.

== Editions ==
=== 2012 ===
The 2012 edition of minus20degree began as a spontaneous idea to create an outdoor snow cinema and invite neighbours and friends to experience projected footage on a wall of snow. This idea quickly turned into a small film festival, screening video works from various artists around the world. Since its inception, the snow screen, or snow cinema has been a fixed feature of every minus20degree biennale.

=== 2014 ===
The 2014 edition showed a selection of film work from around the world, projected onto an outdoor cinema made from snow.

In addition to the projected works on the snow cinema, a guided walk through the forest landscape of Flachau reenacted the play of Dante's Inferno. By placing actors in the landscape, the natural environment became a series of stages through which the viewers traversed. Instead of placing artworks in a space 'designed' for exhibition, minus20degree appropriates the landscape and public space to serve as a screen, stage, and gallery to the artworks that are displayed and performed.

=== 2016 - Melt ===
To date 2016 has presented the largest number of artworks and artists, with 16 artworks on show, 17 nations are represented amongst the 23 artists. The exhibition featured large scale landscape artwork such as that of GEO|METER by Moradavaga, and the performative sound installations of Tetsuya Umeda. The central hub of the exhibition was staged in an excavated snow room; this also served as the projection screen of the edition, for artworks of Christine Maigne and Denis Beaubois. 2016 introduced a performance of Thomas Bernhard's novel, Frost, in which the audience was guided through the dark and snowed over forest of Flachau, while listening to excerpts of the novel's text. The pacing of the walk, and the scenery were curated and timed to synch with the books reading, and emotive qualities, overlaying literature with landscape. In this edition 198 projects were submitted in the open call. One artist, Paul Wiersbinski attempted to break the guinness world record for the largest snowball with the help of passers-by and tourists.

Participating Artists 2016
Artist	Artwork shown
Roberta Orlando	As we used to be
Paul Wiersbinski & Hanna Hildebrand	The Biggest Snowball Ever
Denis Beaubois	Constant
Taus Makhacheva	Crystal Balls
Leanne Wijnsma	Escape
Leonhard Müllner & Jakub Vrba	FIZZ! WHIZZ! BUM!
Theo Deutinger & Heinz Riegler & Johan Nikolussi	Frost
Moradavaga	GEO|METER
Anna Vasof	Icetimer
Julieanna Preston	In Cold Heat
Hyeji Woo & Tim Shaw	Lack
Tetsuya Umeda	Untitled Performance 1
Tetsuya Umeda	Untitled Performance 2
Idan Hayosh	Spring #2
On Transitions Collective	Tracing Landscapes
Christine Maigne	White Hole

=== 2018 - World of Wellness ===
Alongside the contributing artists of the 2018 edition of minus20degree, the exhibition collaborated with the Munster University of Applied Sciences, allowing students to present their site-related architectural work. In addition to this, m20d18 hosted a symposium, in which the future of the exhibition was discussed. External stake holders of the village and contributing artists were welcome to attend and help shape the festival.

Participating Artists 2018
Artist	Artwork shown
Faxen	Apres Apres
Susanna Flock	Forming Storming Norming Performing
Leopold Kessler	Trockenaußenposten
Jelena Micic	Mutation/Adaptation
Sun Li Lian Obwegeser	Spa Fiction
Andrej Polukord	Vitamin Wellness
Andrej Polukord	Grillen Uberall
Puneh Ansari	The Lecture

=== 2020 - Global Village ===
The thematic description of minus20degree 2020 gains inspiration from the theoretical work of Marshall McLuhan. m20d20 collaborated once again with the institution of FH Munster, inviting 17 architecture students to erect a temporary wooden village within Flachau to serve as an epicenter for the exhibition.

Participating Artists 2020
Artist	Artwork shown
Liddy Scheffknecht	Slide
Antti Laitinen]	Deconstructing Nature
Oliver Hangl	Mobile Highspeed Exhibitions - For a Highspeed Society
Leonid Tishkov	People in The Sky
Leonid Tishkov	The Moon on Earth
PolakVanBekkum	Walking the machine
Joshua Legallienne	The Unfolding of Empty Space
Wolfgang Obermair & Peter Fritzenwaller	Flachau Boëdromios
Anna Vasof	Snowman Commits Suicide
Luc Messinezis	Amalgama

=== 2022 - Remote ===
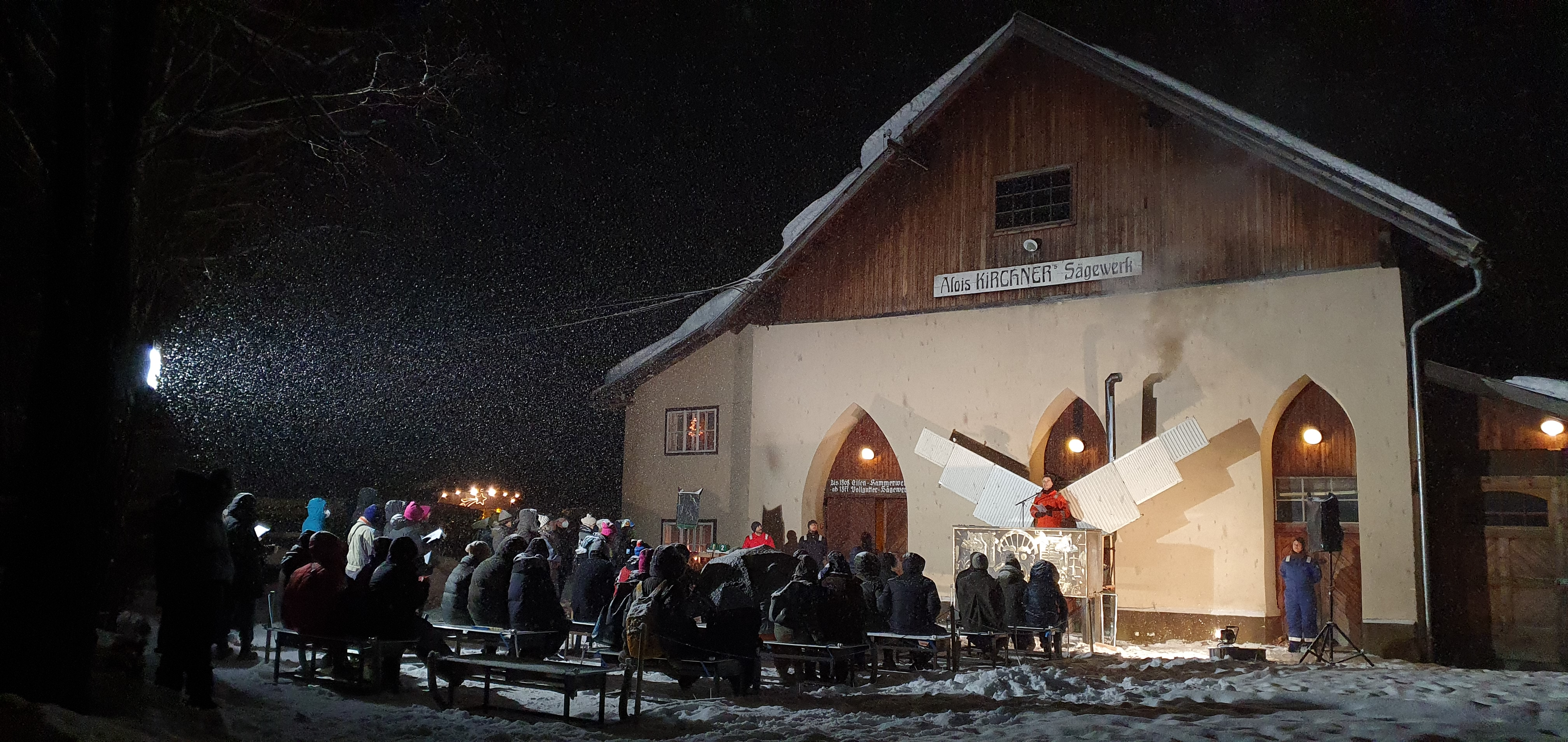
Collectief Walden performs 'Drei Lieder fur Die Autobahn' as a part of minus20degree 2022 in Flachau.

The 2022 edition of the biennale and 10th anniversary since it began featured artists that were invited by a jury consisting of Anna Vasof, Karolina Radenkovic, and Marek Adomov and Barbora Jombikova of Stanica nd the New Synagogue (Žilina), two cultural centres in Zilina. Kasper König joined as co-curator which allowed the invitation of a number of renowned artists. Laura Horelli was invited as a visiting artist to observe the exhibition and the village in preparation for her contribution in the 2024 edition of m20d.

As a part of the exhibition, minus20degree collaborated with the Social Design course of the University of Applied Arts Vienna (Universität für angewandte Kunst Wien) allowing students the opportunity to contribute artworks to the space of the village either as individual artists or small collectives. One such artwork depicting a false advert for McDonald's sparked controvosy amongst the village. Collectief Walden from the Netherlands installed a heated altar and seating, from which an operetta was performed; the lyrics of this performance were lifted from interviews with the local residents of the village. This performance was staged in front of the old saw mill of Flachau, the Kirchner Sägewerk.

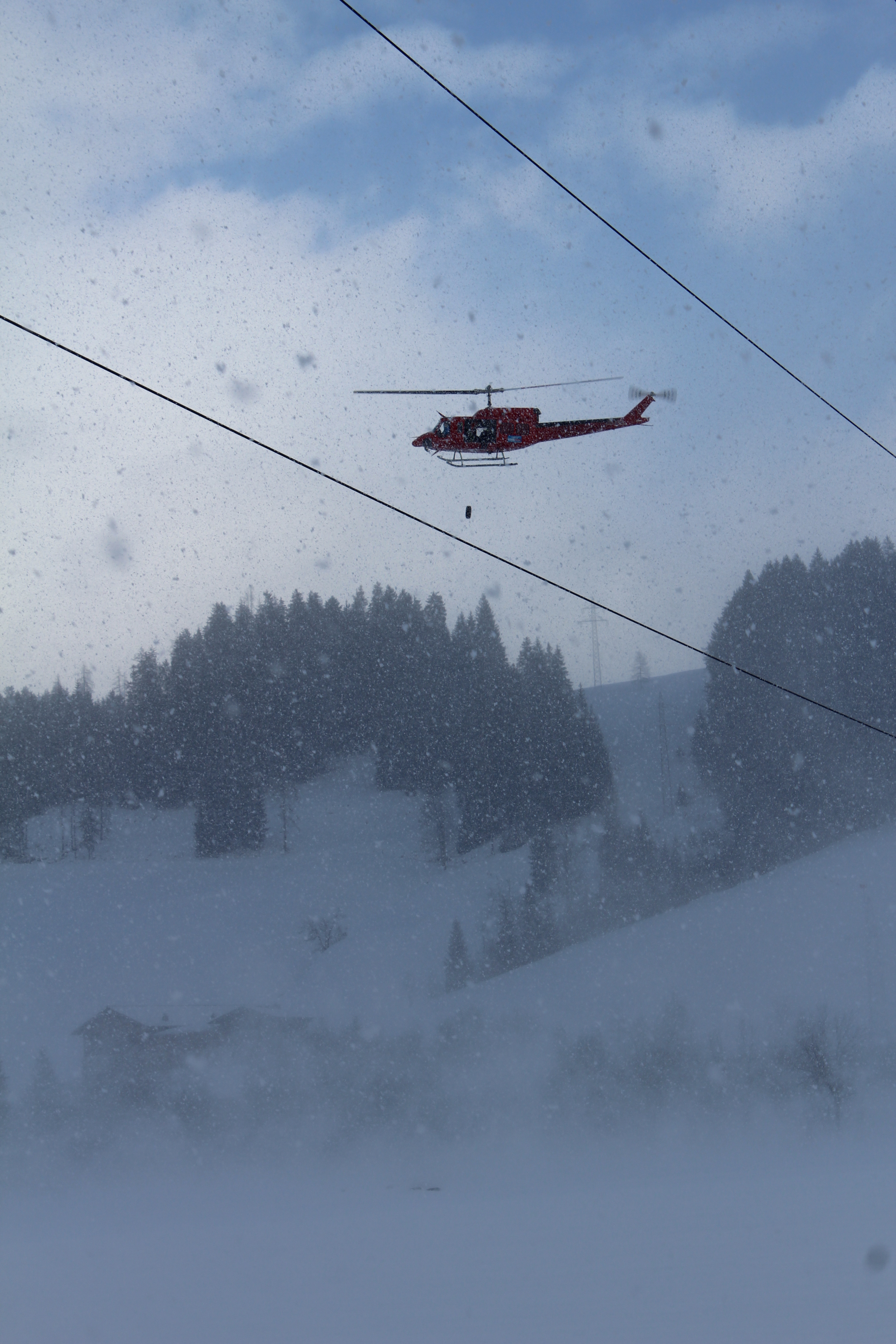
Roman Signer performs 'Fallende Reifen' (Falling Tires) as a part of minus20degree 2022. Pictured is a helicopter, in which Roman Signer sits, throwing tires onto the field of snow below, which can be seen lying in the snow. A tire falls from the helicopter.

Participating Artists 2022
Artist	Artwork shown
Anna Vasof	I'm OK
atelier///	Alles geht den Bach Runter
Collectief Walden	Drei Lieder fur die Autohbahn
Heidi Specker	Magic Mountain
Helga Fanderl	Film auf Schnee
Martin Breindl & Bernhard Kathan	HZWEIO
Roman Signer	Fallende Reifen
Miriam Hamman	Swiftly and silently doing its work

=== 2024 - Plateau ===
2024’s edition of minus20degree focused on the topic Plateau.

The plateau is a geological formation consisting of a vast horizontal plane at a higher altitude found in a mountain range such as the Alps. "Besides its connection to the biennale location, the concept of plateau also offers us a thinking model: reaching a plateau is quite different from reaching a summit. The plateau accommodates many, the summit only offers space for a few. The summit usually promises more summits, while the plateau promises vastness and boundlessness. Living on the plateau is therefore more of a mental and spiritual challenge than a physical one."

The questions that arise are: Can this landscape image be applied to the current state of our western society? Does the fact that we no longer recognize heights, or rather can no longer imagine heights, worry, and unsettle us? And is it even important to reach these heights - if they do exist?

minus20degree 2024 included for the first time a day program, offering seminars, art and architecture. minus20degree 2024 represented seven artworks from international artists and artist collectives. 17 Students of the FH Münster built and serviced the minus20degree Center. Three experts provided the visitors with walking seminars that reflected on this year’s theme “Plateau”. The entire event was mirrored in the exhibition plus20degree at Kunstraum Tracklhaus in the city of Salzburg.

The Jury

The jury selecting the artworks consisted in Thomas Lamers, Günther Oberhollenzer and Francesca Gavin.

Participating Artists 2024
Artist	Artwork shown
Andreas Trobollowitsch	Unter der Autobahn
Anouk Chambaz	The Sentinels
misz SPUTNIK	Après Ski
Liang Jung Chen & Fabio Spink	Wind Tracing
SVUNG Research Group	Cold Comfort
Andreas Zißler	perfect fifth
Theo Deutinger	Nordpol
FH Münster	m20d Zentrum

=== 2026 - Allmende ===
In the Alps, Allmende/Commons is referred to a collectively used resource: pastures, forests, and paths that belonged to no one alone and yet were open to everyone in the community. The commons is based on a social agreement that no one takes more than is harmful to the resource and the other participants, so that everyone can benefit from it. This principle of sharing, caring, and negotiating forms the starting point for the 8th edition of minus20degree.

Under the title Commons – on what unites us, artists and architects ask what holds us together today and how community is formed in terms of negotiated ownership and access rights as well as shared responsibility. The alpine winter landscape of Flachau serves not only as a stage, but also as a concrete space for action in which new artistic, social, and ecological relationships emerge during the biennial.

In a time of increasing individualization and privatization, minus20degree invited us to examine the concept of the commons not only historically, but to investigate it as a contemporary model for thinking and acting. What can the concept of the commons as shared common property mean for our lives today, and how can art itself become a commons - a common resource that arises through participation and exchange?

The Jury

The jury selecting the artworks consisted in Britta Peters, Cornelia Offergeld and Vlado Velkov.

Participating Artists 2024
Artist	Artwork shown
Ronni Shalev & Vero Róza Risnovska	Town Hall Meeting
Helgard Haug (Rimini Protokoll)	4 Meter pro Sekunde
Stephanie Lüning	Snow Action - Version # I
Nicole Six und Paul Petritsch	Snow Archive
Piotr Urbaniec	Communal Falling
AestheticAthletics+	WELLNESS-ANTI-ANTI+
Markus Jeschaunig	Frozen Garden
FH Münster	m20d Zentrum
