= List of Contemporary Art Awards in Russia =

Russian contemporary art awards include both state and private prizes granted in the Russian Federation to artists, curators, and institutions working in the field of contemporary art.

== Active ==
As of spring 2025, Russia had four long-established contemporary art awards — Innovation, the Kandinsky Prize, the Kurekhin Prize, and the award by The Art Newspaper Russia (among them, only Innovation was fully state-funded for a long time, later joined by the Moscow Art Prize). Given the small number of awards, experts noted a crisis in Russia's award system at the end of 2021, citing repetitive winners.

Since 2022, for officially unspecified reasons, two of these awards — Innovation and the Kandinsky Prize — have not been presented.

Name	Year of establishment	Residence	Founder
Sergey Kuryokhin Contemporary Art Award	2009	Saint-Petersburg	Фонд и Центр имени Сергея Курёхина при поддержке Комитета по культуре города
The Art Newspaper Russia Award	2013	Moscow	Журнал The Art Newspaper Russia (частная премия)
Moscow Art Prize	2019	Moscow	The Foundation for the Development of Contemporary Art, supported by the Moscow Department of Culture. It includes five categories: Visual Arts and Architecture, Cinema, Theatre, Music, and Literature. The work's theme must relate to Moscow. The first award ceremony took place in November 2020. The prize fund totals 33 million rubles.

== Abolished ==
List
Name	Name	Comments
General Satellite	2003	Corporate award, founded by the company "GS Group." The award was presented only once in Saint Petersburg. It encouraged the use of modern communication technologies in art. The prize fund was $13,000 or $25,000. There were three categories, including "Best Exhibition Project Idea." The only recipient of the "For Contribution" category was photographer Boris Mikhailov.
"Black Square"	2004-2007	Founders: the public foundation for supporting non-profit projects "Art Moscow" in collaboration with the company "Expo-Park Exhibition Projects." The event was held at the Central House of Artists (CDH).
Master	2004-2009	Presented by the "Kovcheg" gallery and the "Era" foundation. The award recognized the best exhibition project of the season in the traditional categories of "painting" and "graphics." It did not have a monetary prize.
Soratnik	2006-2012	Founders: curator Olga Lopukhova and artist Anton Litvin. (Presented by the professional community)
Moscow Biennale of Contemporary Art Award (Albert Award)	2009	The award was created by artist Yuri Albert. In 2009, it was given to Romuald Hazoumè, an artist from Benin, for his project "Cargo." The prize was 450,000 rubles. According to the award's rules, the money is given to the winner's relatives to cover funeral expenses if the artist passes away within the next two years (before the next biennale).
The Moscow International Biennale for Young Art Award	2016	In 2016, at the 5th Biennale, the sponsor was the Italian brand Furla. The laureates in 2016 were artists Marguerite Humeau from France and Juliana Serqueira Leite from Brazil.
Award of the Art Foundation "Moscow Biennale"	2015	In 2015, it was announced that the Art Foundation "Moscow Biennale" and the Ruinart House established an award for Russian artists. The winner was Taus Makhacheva; however, the award did not develop further.
Zverev Art Prize (Anatoly Zverev Award)	2021	Museum AZ, Natalia Opaleva. Since 2024, a "sequel" award has been established — the Zverev Art Prize / Perspective. Interpretation. Position — aimed at art journalists and art historians for the best books and articles on nonconformism and contemporary art.
Innovation Award	2005-2021	Moscow, National Centre for Contemporary Arts (NCCA) (since 2021 — along with numerous co-founders). State award. Since 2019 — Nizhny Novgorod.
Kandinsky Prize	2007-2021	The Kandinsky Prize, named after Russian painter Wassily Kandinsky is an award sponsored by the Deutsche Bank AG and the Art Chronika Culture Foundation. It was organized in hopes of developing Russian contemporary art, and to reinforce the status of Russian art within the world. In total, 55,000 euros are awarded to the artists.
"Arts & Fashion Awards"	2021 - 2022	The Award in Contemporary Art and Fashion aims to support and promote talented artists, designers, and creative professionals. The award features several categories and combines public voting with jury decisions. Ceremonies are held in Moscow and are accompanied by fashion shows, exhibitions, and auctions. The main partner of the award is the Institute of Contemporary Art (ICI). The award is held with the support of the Moscow Government and the Ministry of Culture of the Russian Federation. In 2021, the award was presented during Arts & Fashion Week at ArtNovi Space, and in 2022 at New Manege during Arts & Fashion Weekend.
The Art Theatre Award	2023	In its debut season, among other theatrical categories, the Moscow Art Theatre (MAT) Award included a category for "Contemporary Art." Nominees were Vova Perkin, Jolie Alien, and Evgeny Muzalevsky. However, the jury decided not to award a prize in this category, and it was subsequently removed from the award.
