= Not from There =

- Also known as: The Rubber Dolls
- Origin: London, England
- Genres: Rock; alternative rock; indie rock; noise rock
- Years active: 1991–2001
- Labels: Trinity; Malignant; Infectious; Festival Mushroom; Kool Arrow
- Past members: Anthony Hills; Simon Lambert; Heinz Riegler

Not from There were an Australian indie rock trio, which formed in 1991 in London, England by Anthony Hills on bass guitar, Simon Lambert on drums and Heinz Riegler on lead guitar and vocals. They relocated to Brisbane in 1992. Their 1998 single, "Sich Öffnen", was listed on radio station Triple J's Hottest 100. Their debut album, Sand on Seven (September 1998), won the Best Alternative Release category at the ARIA Music Awards in 1999. Not from There's sound was characterised by grinding bass lines, fuzzed-out guitar riffs and occasional usage of dubs or samples.

== History ==
=== 1991–1997: Early history ===
Not from There was founded in 1991 by Austrian-born guitarist and vocalist, Heinz Riegler, who had met two Australian expat musicians in London, drummer Simon Lambert and bass guitarist Anthony Hills and together they formed a trio. Initially working as the Rubber Dolls, they recorded material in London. According to Riegler their first gig was in February 1991, "at the Mean Fiddler in London, it was a Tuesday night. Nobody was there. I took acid and forgot how to play. It went down a treat. Possibly the best show we have ever done."

The name, Not from There, relates to all three members as immigrants who have been deported to their home countries at one time or another. They have issued four extended plays; two early ones were a six-track CD, Conned, released in 1991 on Trinity in the United Kingdom, and an eight-track cassette, Wooden Polished Floors released in 1992 on the same label. At this time both Australians, Hills and Lambert, were deported from UK, with Riegler following, to Brisbane.

A seven-track CD was released in September 1994, Valid to 06/95, on Malignant Records, an independent record label. In 1995 Riegler was deported from Australia to Austria but returned in the following year. Not from There, a self-titled five-track EP, followed in October 1997 on Infectious Records. It had been recorded at Brisbane's Sunshine Studios in July, with Magoo (Regurgitator, Automatic, Custard) producing for Mushroom Records.

=== 1998–1999: Sand on Seven ===
A three-track single, "What Is Better?", was released by Not from There in May 1998 via Infectious/Mushroom, which Australian musicologist, Ian McFarlane, felt showed, "jarring rock, with slabs of guitar and industrial strength samples" and "was certainly the dark and dangerous flipside to the radio-friendly sounds." It was followed by a second single, "Sich Öffnen" (English: "Open Yourself"), in August, which is mostly sung in Riegler's native Austrian German. The track was broadcast on indie-based radio stations and received heavy rotation on national radio broadcaster, Triple J. It was listed on the Triple J Hottest 100, 1998. Their Infectious Records releases were later distributed by Sony.

Their debut album, Sand on Seven, was released in September and was produced by Magoo, again. It received critical success and moderate commercial success. AllMusic's Tom Schulte rated it as three-out-of-five stars and explained, "[they] landed upon a relentlessly stable form of noisy indie pop that instrumentally is all about rhythm. Any melody is understated, even vocally. Maybe it is just overcompensation on their part." Alex Steininger of In Music We Trust rated it as an A, he observed, "[their] sound is best described as out-of-this-world rock music that is original and noisy, which is what you should be looking for in your so-called 'rock' music today."

Sand on Seven won the ARIA Award for Best Adult Alternative Album in 1999. The group were also nominated for Breakthrough Artist – Album, Breakthrough Artist – Single and Magoo was nominated for Producer of the Year for his work on the album. A follow-up single, "Juanita's Cocktail Party", was released in January 1999, and despite having a music video, it failed to achieve the chart success of its predecessor.

=== 2000–2001: Latvian Lovers ===
Not from There provided a cover version of Supernaut's "I Like It Both Ways" for the soundtrack of Australian feature film, Sample People (May 2000). McFarlane opined that it is, " a brooding cover" of the original's 1976 "glam rock apotheosis." They released their second album, Latvian Lovers, on 12 September 2000, which was produced by Magoo for Festival Mushroom Records. It provided a more disco or funk-oriented feel than their earlier material and managed to sound more accessible, however it failed to gain the critical success of the previous album. It evolved on the electronic side of the first album throughout. Adam Gould of Woroni opined, "[it is] a big departure from earlier Not from There material. Gone are the layers of distortion and feedback, in their place are sequencers and synthesiser. Despite the change in approach and instrument the band have generally kept the same feel to their music."

Mediasearch's Peter Peterson felt, "[it] has a melancholy, almost desperate feel. Built on mostly slow-middle tempo beats, it has definite European influences." Australian music journalist, Ed Nimmervoll, declared it his Album of the Week in February 2001 and explained, "a diverse collection of music which evokes the pop groove of Regurgitator or Max Q, the irreverence of TISM, the rock/dance balance of a New Order, and the technology generated focus of an Aphex Twin."

Its first single, "Frisco Disco", was released in January 2001 but had limited commercial success although it was used on the soundtrack of Australian TV drama, The Secret Life of Us. Oz Music Project's Nick Coppack described the track, "The fast paced electro insanity of current single 'Frisco Disco' is frighteningly reminiscent of The Bee Gees, especially with Riegler's playful high-pitched vocals."

Not from There broke up in 2001. Riegler, in June 2017, told Dan Condon of Double J, "Much of the friendships and camaraderie had corroded over the last few years of that band."

=== 2002–present: Post-split ===
Heinz Riegler continued to work on a variety of projects, he collaborated with Lawrence English and Tam Patton in the experimental, ambient, noise outfit I/O3 which issued two recordings on English's Room 40 label. Simon Lambert joined Japanese group, Zoobombs; he toured and recorded with the group from 2003 to 2004.

In July 2008, Riegler was short-listed for the Grant McLennan Memorial Fellowship, a Queensland Government Initiative created in honour of the late The Go-Betweens founder.

== Discography ==
=== Albums ===
List of albums
Title	Details
Sand on Seven	Released: September 1998; Label: Infectious/Mushroom (DINF023); Formats: CD
Latvian Lovers	Released: September 2000; Label: Infectious/Festival Mushroom (333502); Formats: CD

=== Extended plays ===
List of EPs
Title	Details
Conned	Released: 1991; Label: Trinity (Trinity LP1); Formats: 12"
Polished Wooden Floors	Released: 1992; Label: Trinity; Formats: 12"
Valid to 06/95	Released: September 1994; Label: Malignant (TUMOR 011); Formats: CD
Not from There	Released: October 1997; Label: Infectious/Mushroom (DINF012); Formats: CD

=== Charting singles ===
List of singles, with selected chart positions and certifications
Title	Year	Peak positions	Album
Title	Year	AUS	Album
"Frisco Disco"	2000	89	Latvian Lovers

== Awards and nominations ==
=== ARIA Music Awards ===
The ARIA Music Awards is an annual awards ceremony that recognises excellence, innovation, and achievement across all genres of Australian music. They commenced in 1987.

Year	Nominee / work	Award	Result	Ref.
1999	"Sich Offnen"	Breakthrough Artist - Single	Nominated	
1999	Sand on Seven	Breakthrough Artist - Album	Nominated	
1999	Sand on Seven	Best Adult Alternative Album	Won	
1999	Magoo for Sand on Seven	Producer of the Year	Nominated	
