= Roman Signer =

Swiss artist (born 1938)

Roman Signer (born 1938 in Appenzell, Switzerland) is an artist who works in sculpture, art installation, photography, and video.

== Early life and career ==
Signer started his career as an artist at the age of 28, after working various jobs such as an architect’s draughtsman and a radio engineer apprentice. He holds degrees from arts institutions in Switzerland and Poland. He studied at the Schule für Gestaltung in Zurich and Lucerne from 1966 to 1971, and at the Academy of Fine Arts, Warsaw from 1971 to 1972.

== Work ==
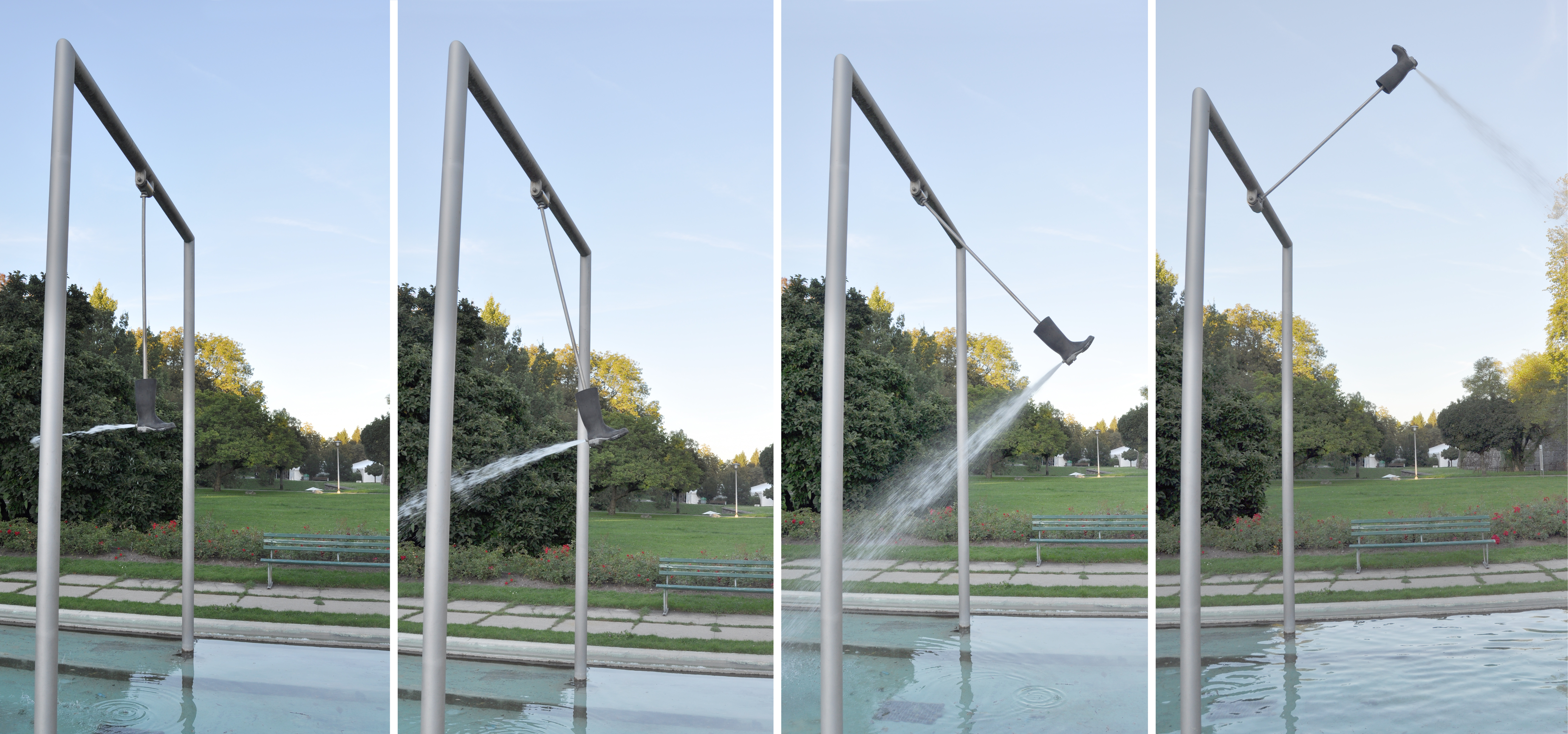
"Boot Fountain" in Solothurn

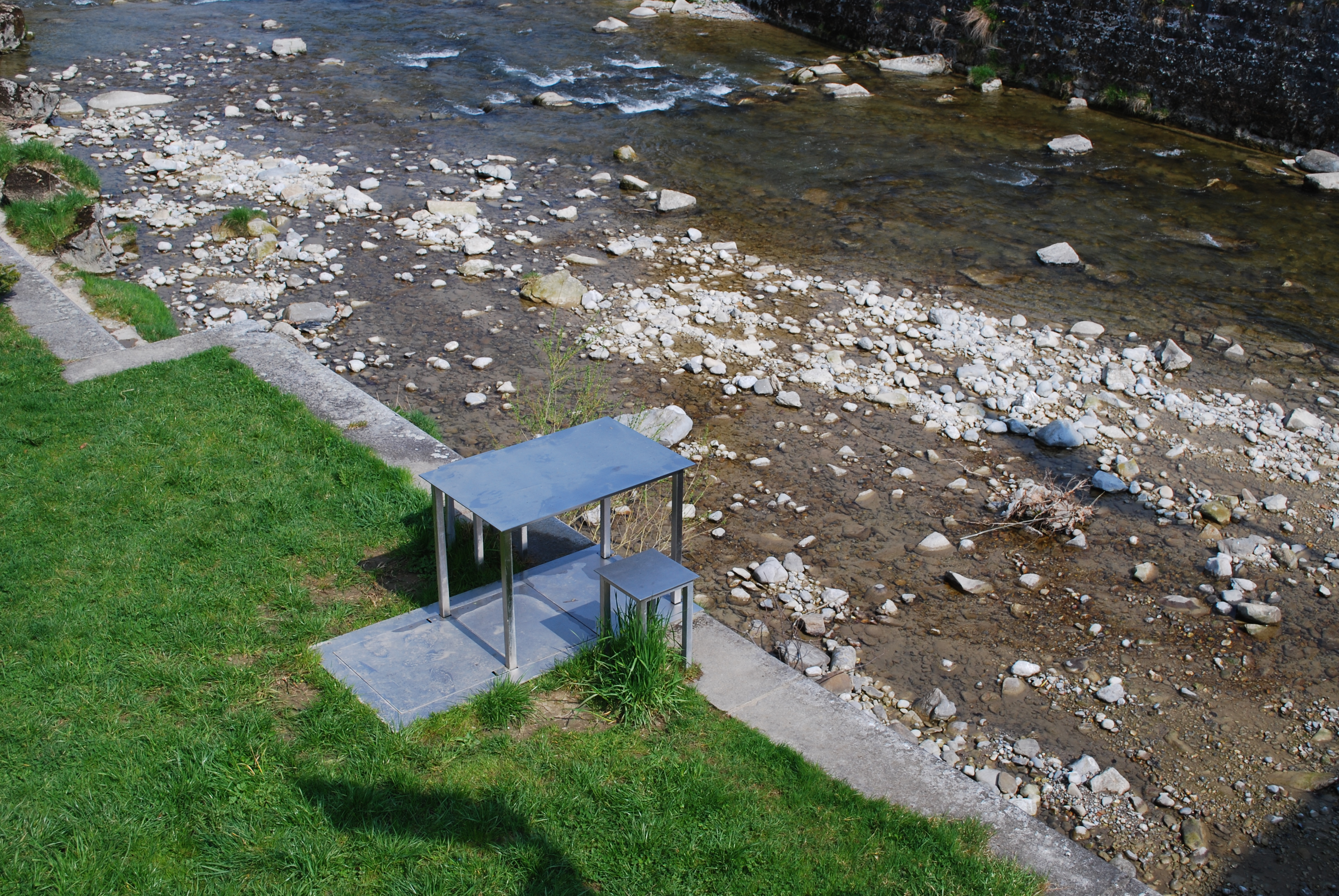
Der Tisch (The Table) in Appenzell

Signer's work grew out of land art and performance art. It is often described as following the tradition of the Swiss engineer-artist, such as Jean Tinguely and Peter Fischli & David Weiss.

Signer creates art centred around "controlled destruction, not destruction for its own sake", using or destroying everyday objects in unusual ways for an artistic result. Many of his happenings are not for public viewing, and are only documented in photos and film.

As well as working in his studio, Signer often conducts larger experiments in the Swiss mountains. One example of his installation work is "Accident as sculpture" (Unfall als Skulptur) (2008), in which Signer had a three-wheeled delivery car, loaded with water barrels, roll down an 11 m high ramp and up the other side. At the apex, the vehicle overturned and crashed to the ground. The resulting chaotic arrangement constituted the exhibition at Kunstraum Dornbirn.

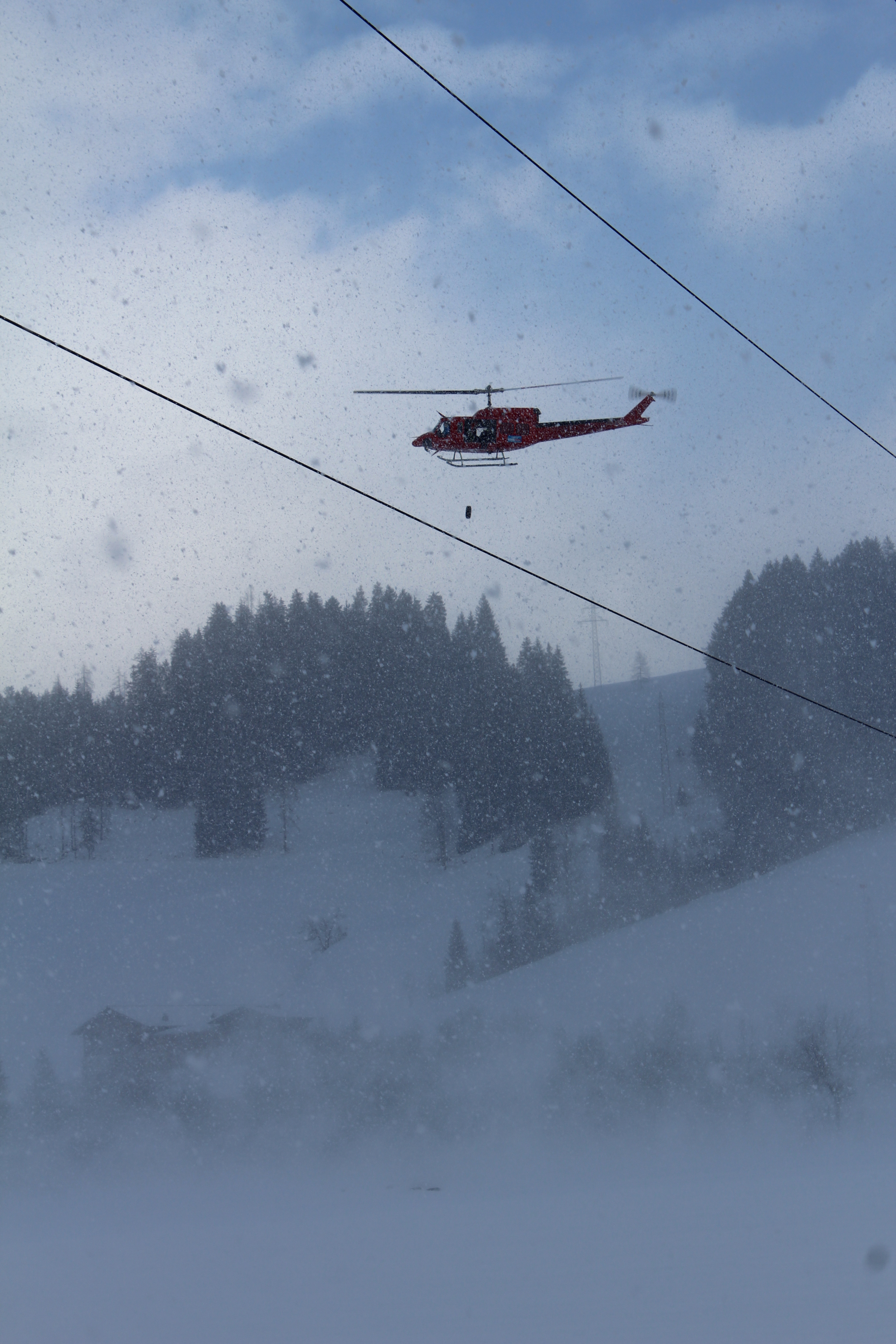
Roman Signer performs 'Fallende Reifen' (Falling Tires) as a part of minus20degree 2022. Pictured is a helicopter, in which Signer sits, throwing tires onto the field of snow below.

A collaborative film from 1996 with director Peter Liechti titled "Signer's Koffer" (English: "Signer's Suitcase") documents a series of his "action sculptures" along with interviews of Roman Signer and other characters encountered during his travels performing the work.

== Exhibitions ==
Signer's work has been shown at galleries and museums in Europe, North America and Asia over the last thirty years. It was featured in Venice Biennale (1976), documenta 8, Kassel (1987), Skulptur Projekte Münster (1997), and minus20degree (2022).

In 2016, the Kunstmuseum Basel acquired 205 films by Signer in Super 8 format, which were then exhibited at the museum as well at the MAN Museum in Nuoro. The films shown were all produced between 1975 and 1989 and were all silent and shorter than three minutes.

=== Selected solo shows ===
- 2015 Barbican Centre London, 'Slow Movement'
- 2012 Kunsthalle Mainz
- 2009 Kunsthaus Zug, Roman Signer - Werke 1975-2007
- 2009 Hamburger Kunsthalle, Roman Signer - Projektionen. Filme und Videos 1975 - 2008
- 2008 Helmhaus Zürich, Roman Signer: Projektionen. Filme und Videos 1975 - 2008
- 2008 Kunstraum Dornbirn, Installation. Unfall als Skulptur
- 2008 Rochester Art Center, Roman Signer: Works
- 2008 Hauser & Wirth London
- 2007 Hamburger Bahnhof, Roman Signer – Werke aus der Friedrich Christian Flick Collection - Museum für Gegenwart, Berlin
- 2007 Fruitmarket Gallery, Roman Signer – Works
- 2006 Ludwig Forum für Internationale Kunst, Roman Signer. Kunstpreis Aachen 2006
- 2006 Aargauer Kunsthaus, Roman Signer – Reisefotos
- 2006 Galician Centre of Contemporary Art, Roman Signer. Esculturas e instalacións, Santiago de Compostela
- 2019 Château de Montsoreau-Museum of contemporary art, Roman Signer

== Awards ==
- 2010 Prix Meret Oppenheim
- 2008 Finalist for the Hugo Boss Prize
- 2008 Ernst-Franz-Vogelmann-Preis für Skulptur, Heilbronn
- 2006 Kunstpreis Aachen
- 2004 Kulturpreis der Stadt St. Gallen
- 1998 Konstanzer Kunstpreis
- 1998 Kulturpreis St. Gallen
- 1998 Kulturpreis Konstanz
- 1995 Kulturpreis Bregenz
- 1977 Eidgenössisches Kunststipendium
- 1974 Eidgenössisches Kunststipendium
- 1972 Eidgenössisches Kunststipendium
- 1972 Kiefer-Hablitzel Stipendium

== Bibliography ==
- 1999 Konrad Bitterli, Roman Signer, Venice Biennale and Walther König, Cologne
- 2005 Gerhard Mack, Paula van den Bosch, Jeremy Millar, Roman Signer, Phaidon, London
- 2008 Rachel Whiters, Roman Signer, DuMont, London
- 2014 David Signer, Roman Signer: Talks and Conversations, Walther König, Cologne

== Influences ==
A photo of Signer's "Wasser Stiefel" serves as the cover art of Upgrade & Afterlife (1996), an album by American experimental music group Gastr del Sol.
