= Handbook of Tyranny =

2018 non-fiction book by Theo Deutinger

- Author: Theo Deutinger
- Language: English
- Subjects: Architecture, human-rights, ecology
- Genre: Non-fiction
- Published: Switzerland
- Publisher: Lars Müller Publishers
- Publication date: 2018
- Pages: 160
- ISBN: 978-3037785348

Handbook of Tyranny is a 2018 non-fiction book by Theo Deutinger. It documents how architecture is used to protect and control humans and animals.

== Publication ==
Handbook of Tyranny, is written by architect and cartographer Theo Deutinger and published by Lars Müller Publishers in 2018. It has 160 pages.

== Synopsis ==
The book documents the architecture of refugee camps, prisons, slaughter houses, and border fences and how they are used to control animals and people. It illustrates architectural features used to prevent human migration, suicide, terrorism, and illicit drug injection. Themes include nationalism, terrorism, corporate power, and economic globalisation.

The format of each chapter incorporates explanatory text and annotated graphics. It also incorporates two essays, one by American journalist Brendan McGetrick. The presentation of data mimics the styles that Ernst Neufert used in his 1936 reference book Architects' Data.

== Critical reception and influence ==
Aaron Betsky described the "deeply ironic beauty" of the book, which he also calls terrifying and notes how "ingenious we have become at harming others through both architecture."

The book won the Festival international du livre d'art et du film book award for architecture in 2018.

The book inspired a Carleton University architecture student's project Machine Atlas, which won the Architect Magazine's 2020 Studio Prize. Machine Atlas featured illustrations on extractivism.
