= Heinz Riegler =

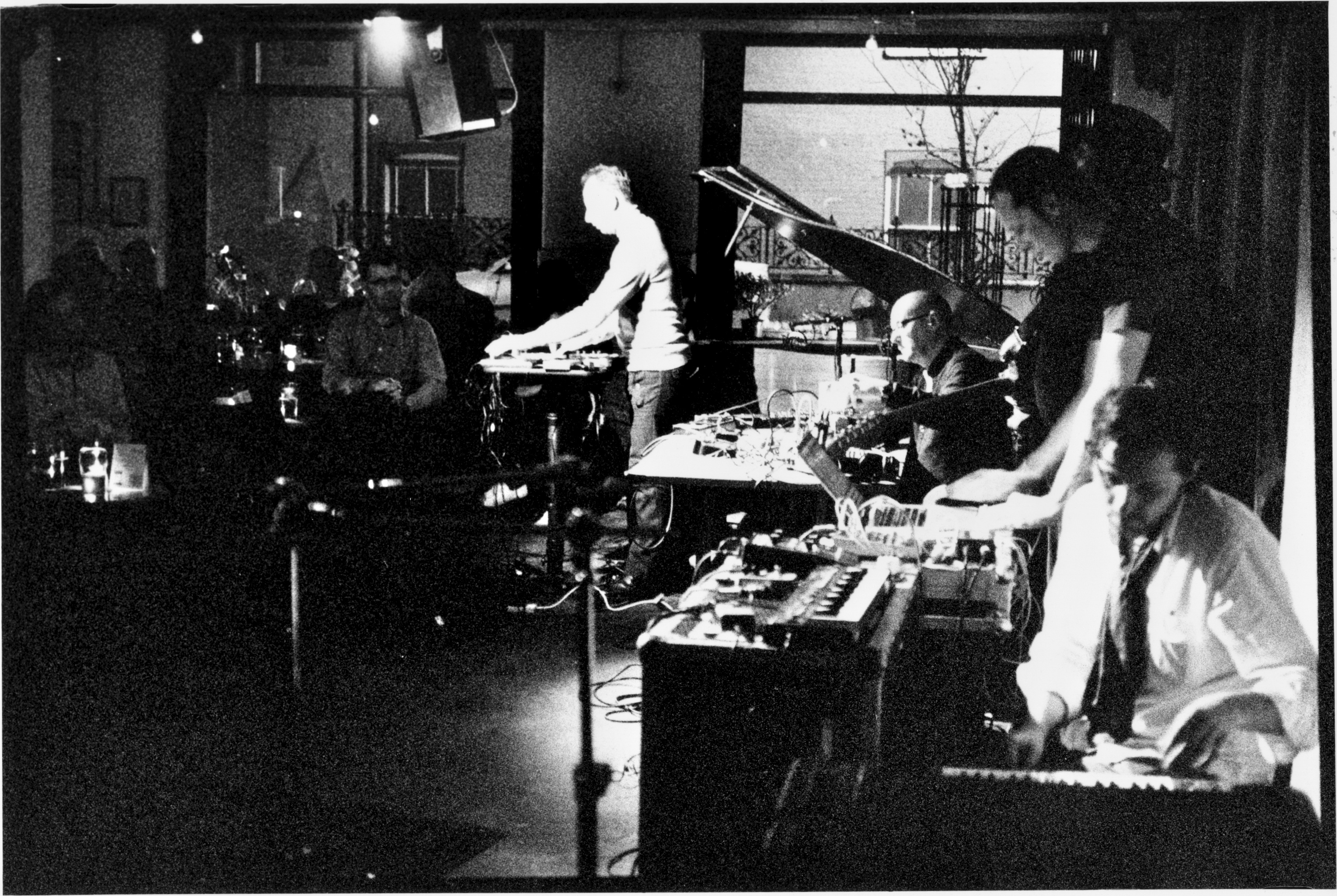
- Riegler performing at the Cafe Oto in 2013

Background information
- Born: August 11, 1969; Vienna, Austria
- Occupations: Musician, songwriter, vocalist, artist
- Instruments: guitar, voice, electronics
- Years active: 1988 -
- Labels: Mushroom Records, Kool Arrow, Dot Dash, Infectious Records, Room40, A Guide To Saints,
- Website: Official website

Heinz Riegler (born 11 August 1969) is an Austrian-born artist. He began gaining popularity from his performances and songwriting in the late 1980s. Riegler worked both as a solo artist and a performer. He was a member of the indie rock band Not from There. Riegler was shortlisted twice for the Grant McLennan Memorial Fellowship, and he is the co-founder of minus20degree.

== Career ==
=== 1990s ===
As the founder, vocalist, guitarist, and principal songwriter of Australian indie band Not From There, Rielgler was successful at the ARIA Music Awards in 1999. The band released two albums, Sand On Seven and Latvian Lovers, along with numerous EP's and singles, performing from 1991 through to 2000.

=== 2000s ===
Riegler went on to collaborate with Lawrence English and Tam Patton (Full Fathom Five) in the Brisbane-based experimental/improv group I/O3. The group released two limited edition LPs, Powerhouse Sessions and A Picturesque View, Ignored on the Room40 label. As a member of I/O3, Riegler has collaborated with sound artists Mike Cooper, David Toop, Robin Rimbaud (Scanner), Ben Frost and DJ Olive. Near the beginning of the decade, Riegler also contributed guitar work to Lawrence English's Transit and Calm LPs, as well as adding lyrics and vocals to Adam Franklin’s solo debut project Toshack Highway.

Following some time out from musical endeavors, Riegler has since returned to work on material for a solo album, as well as performing live. Riegler has also curated an extensive season of improvised live scores for the Queensland Gallery of Modern Art. The three-month season in late 2008, titled Out of The Shadows: German Expressionism And Beyond, saw Riegler hand-pick a selection of artists to perform live scores to silent films. During the season, Riegler also took on a number of improvised performances in solo mode.

Twice shortlisted for the Grant McLennan Memorial Fellowship in 2008 and 2009, Riegler began to perform new material live in concert around the same time. Compiling selected audio recordings from the previous ten years, Riegler released a limited edition of 60 audio cassettes in 2009. Titled "Survey #1," the cassette contained demo songs, excerpts from The Shadows: German Expressionism And Beyond instrumental works, as well as other previously unreleased compositions and collaborations.

2009 also saw Riegler's exhibit "Five Frames," a debut collection of visual artworks as part of a group exhibition at Brisbane’s Doggett Street Studios.

=== 2010s ===
In October 2010, Riegler released a limited edition 7-inch vinyl single titled "And The Lovers Make A Scene" / "Andy Looks Up At The Sky," collaborating with three visual artists (Bo Stahlman, Alex Gillies, Stephen Mok) to create three sets of artwork. The entire collection of 7-inch vinyl was then released as part of an exhibition at Brisbane's Doggett Street Studios gallery.

To mark 10 years since Room40's release of A Picturesque View, Ignored LP in 2001, Riegler returned to perform with I/O3, David Toop and Scanner (Robin Rimbaud) for the Open Frame Festival at London’s Cafe Oto.

Riegler spent large parts of 2011 in his native Austria working on recording projects, as well as completing a single-channel video piece titled Motion Portrait #1. This work was named winner at MICA TonBild 2011 in Vienna, Austria, in November 2011 and two years later was selected for the inaugural Channels Festival and the Ikono Festival, where it screened at the Australian Centre for the Moving Image in September 2013.

Audio recordings made in Austria during an 80-day spell in an alpine mountain cabin were released titled Survey #2 (One Thousand Dreams I Never Had) on Room40’s new A Guide To Saints imprint in May 2012. An accompanying single channel video piece titled No Colour/No Sound, Part I, was subsequently premiered on the Australian music website Mess & Noise.
