= Theo Deutinger =

Austrian architect, illustrator, academic, and author

- Born: 1971 (age 53–54); Austrian
- Occupation(s): Architect, illustrator, academic, author
- Organization: TD Architects
- Notable work: Handbook of Tyranny (2018 book)

Theo Deutinger (born 1971) is an Austrian architect, illustrator, academic, and author. He is the a co-founder of the Minus20degree art and architecture exhibition, and the author of the 2018 non-fiction book Handbook of Tyranny.

== Career ==
Deutinger the owner-operator of Dutch company TD Architects In 2017, he proposed the creation of the island city state Europe in Africa. The European Union-funded Europe in Africa island nation concept would be located between the continents of Africa and Europe and would allow visa-free travel for anyone seeking refuge, with similar characteristics of a refugee camp, but city-sized and within the protectorate of the EU.

In 2018, Deutinger made a series of graphics to illustrate the small number of countries that permit visa-free travel.

Along with Stefanos Filippas, Ana Rita Marques, Eliza Mante, and Heinz Riegler, Deutinger founded the Minus20degree biennale contemporary art and architecture exhibition.

== Works ==
=== Handbook of Tyranny (book) ===
Deutinger's Handbook of Tyranny (Lars Müller Publishers, 2018) documents how the architecture of refugee camps, prisons, slaughter houses and migration control systems are used to control animals and people. It details how architectural features used to prevent human migration, suicide, terrorism, and illicit drug injection.

Aaron Betsky described the "deeply ironic beauty" of the book, which he also calls terrifying and notes how "ingenious we have become at harming others through both architecture". The book won the Festival international du livre d'art et du film book award for architecture in 2018.

=== Ultimate Atlas (book) ===
Ultimate Atlas: Logbook of Spaceship Earth is a 2019 book that contains data visualisations of global politics. Wojciech Czaja and Maik Novotny called it "radically abstract" and "beautiful" in their review published in Der Standard.

=== Walled World (map) ===
Deutinger's 2009 map Walled World illustrates how walls, fences, borders and security forces divide the earth into a lower populated wealthy area and a densely populated poorer zone.

Walled World details how the Korean demilitarized zone, activities of the Australian Defence Force, the United States-Mexico border, Spain's Melilia border fence, Europe's Schengen border and the Israeli West Bank barrier form a global anti-migration loop. Inside the loop are 14% of the world's population who generate 73% of the world's income, outside the loop are 86% of the earth's population, who generate 27% of the world's income.

Deutinger has stated that his map was inspired by the German philosopher Peter Sloterdijk. Professor Sabine Niederer of the Amsterdam University of Applied Sciences described the map as "poignant".

=== Independence Day (map) ===
With architects Filip Cieloch and Lucia de Usera, in 2015, Deutinger produced the Independence Day map that projected what Europe would look like if every successionist movement succeeded in its goals.
