= Museyib Shahbazov =

Azerbaijani statesman (1898–1938)

Museyib Shahbazov Müseyib Şahbazov
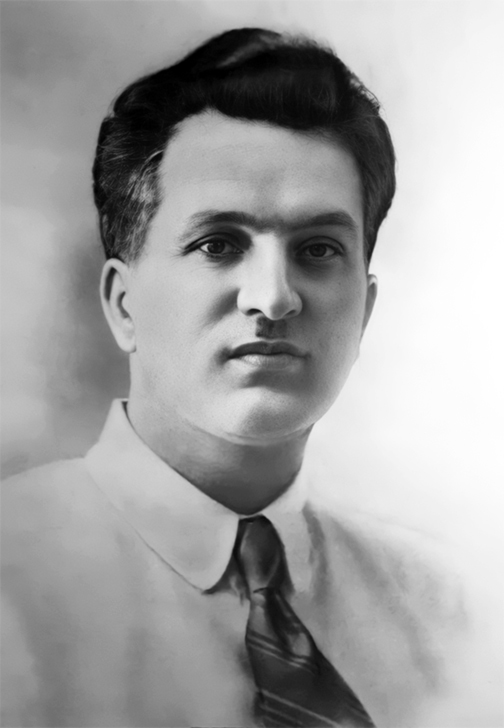

Commissar of People's Education of the Azerbaijan SSR
- In office 1935–1937
- Preceded by: Mammad Juvarlinsky
- Succeeded by: Mammadsadig Afandiyev

Personal details
- Born: 1898 Petrovsk-Port, Dagestan Oblast, Russian Empire
- Died: 1938 (aged 39–40) Baku, Azerbaijan SSR, USSR
- Cause of death: execution
- Party: CPSU
- Awards: Order of the Red Banner of Labour

Museyib Ali oghlu Shahbazov (Azerbaijani: Müseyib Əli oğlu Şahbazov, 1898–1938) was an Azerbaijani-Soviet party figure and statesman, revolutionary, Commissar of People's Education of the Azerbaijan SSR.

== Biography ==
Museyib Shahbazov was born in 1898 in Petrovsk-Port, Dagestan Oblast. After receiving his primary education at a village school, he went to Astrakhan with his father, and after a while, he continued his education at a realny school in Derbent.

M. Shahbazov had been interested in public life since school age, joined artistic association and read banned books. Gradually, he began to study Marxist literature, attending workers' meetings and rallies. The first periods of his revolutionary activity took place in Dagestan. He was then persecuted by the government and went to Astrakhan. Arriving in Astrakhan in early April 1918, Museyib Shahbazov made contacts with the Muslim branch of the RC(b)P provincial committee headed by Nariman Narimanov and joined the Bolsheviks party.

Museyib Shahbazov was sent to study in Moscow under the auspices of the RC(b)P provincial committee. After graduating from the Moscow Red Professorial Institute of Literature, he was mobilized to work in the political department of the XIII Army. From 1918 he worked as a propagandist in the political department of the same army, in Astrakhan he was the secretary of the "Hummet" party, the secretary of the Derbent Revolutionary Committee, the secretary of the RC(b)P South Dagestan and Gaytag-Tabasaran district committees.

M. Shahbazov came to Soviet Azerbaijan in 1921; he first worked in the Emergency Commission fighting the counter-revolution, then headed the Ganja Uyezd Executive Committee, and worked as the Deputy People's Commissar for Justice of the Azerbaijan SSR. From 1923 he worked as the head of the propaganda department of the Central Committee of the AC(b)P, and the secretary of the Ganja Uyezd Committee of the AC(b)P.

Museyib Shahbazov was elected rector to the Azerbaijan State University on 22 June 1929. He worked in this position until the beginning of August of the same year.

He was the editor of the "Yeni yol" newspaper and at his initiative, the first "Muallime komek" magazine was published in Azerbaijan in 1934.

In 1935–1937 Museyib Shahbazov was the Commissar of People's Education of the Azerbaijan SSR. He was the author of articles on the importance of switching to the Latin alphabet.

M. Shahbazov was elected a member of the Central Committee of the AC(b)P, the Central Executive Committee of the Azerbaijan SSR and the Central Executive Committee of the TSFSR, a member of the Transcaucasian Trade Union Council and the Central Committee of the Trade Union of Educators, he was a representative of the 14th Congress of the AUC(b)P, and on 27 January 1936 he was awarded the Order of the Red Banner of Labor.

Shahbazov was married to Lyubov Martinovna, had two daughters named Svetlana and Leyla. Leyla Shahbazova was an Honored Lawyer of the Azerbaijan SSR.

Museyib Shahbazov was arrested in September 1937 in the name of "People's Enemy" and was executed in 1938. He was posthumously acquitted on 3 September 1955.
