= Sand on Seven =

Studio album by Not from There
- Released: November 1998
- Genre: Indie rock, noise rock
- Length: 47:05
- Label: Koolarrow Records

Not from There chronology
Sand on Seven (1998)	Latvian Lovers (2001)

Sand On Seven is the debut album by Australian indie band Not from There. The album won the ARIA Award for Best Adult Alternative Album at the ARIA Music Awards of 1999. "Sich Offnen" and "Abgedroschen" are sung entirely in lead singer Heinz Riegler's native tongue, German.

== Track listing ==
1. "Hurricane Charlie" - 2:22
2. "Juanita's Cocktail Party" - 4:12
3. "Neurons" - 6:54
4. "The Corkscrew" - 3:58
5. "N" - 4:57
6. "Sich Offnen" - 3:49
7. "A Loser's Plea and the World's Weather" - 4:02
8. "What Is Better Now" - 6:00
9. "Abgedroschen" - 3:59
10. "The Orb f Discomfort" - 1:52
11. "Three Words Repeated" - 5:00
