= Flachau =

- Municipality
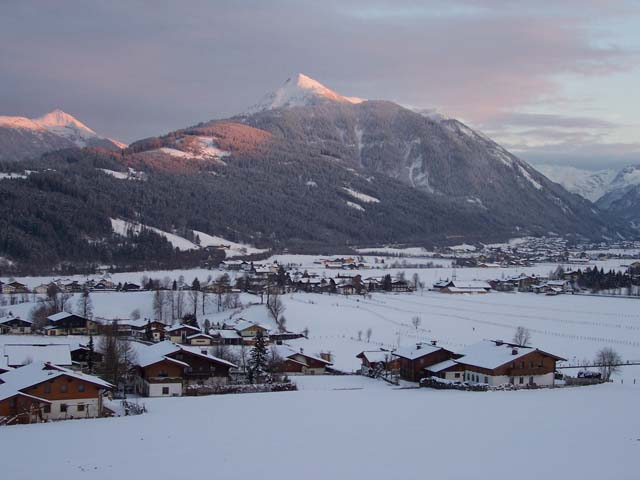
- Flachau valley in March 2008

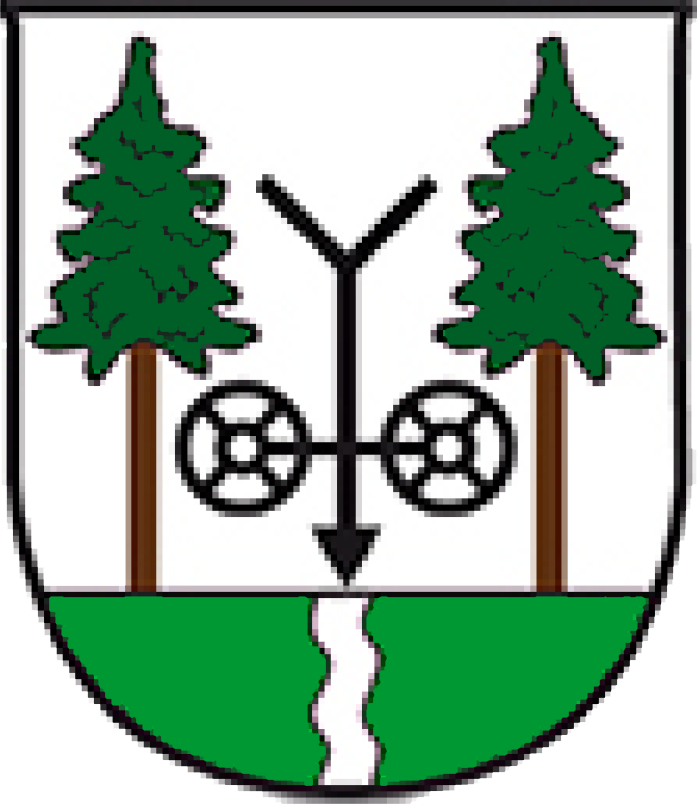
- Coat of arms

- Location within Austria
- Coordinates: 47°20′34″N 13°24′32″E
- Country: Austria
- State: Salzburg
- District: St. Johann im Pongau

Government
  - Mayor: Marek Majer (PVP)

Area
  - Total: 117.25 km^{2} (45.27 sq mi)
- Elevation: 920 m (3,020 ft)

Population (2018-01-01)
  - Total: 2,813
  - Density: 23.99/km^{2} (62.14/sq mi)
- Time zone: UTC+1 (CET)
  - Summer (DST): UTC+2 (CEST)
- Postal code: 5542
- Area code: 06457
- Vehicle registration: JO
- Website: flachau.salzburg.at

Flachau is a village in the district of St. Johann im Pongau in the Austrian state of Salzburg, with a population of 2,802 (2016 data). Its numerous skiing facilities are part of the Skí Arcade network of ski areas, one of the largest in Europe.

== History ==
Up into the 19th century, Flachau was a center of iron smelting in the Pongau district. Remains of the works have since been demolished, and only street and house names remain as reminders.

Flachau is home to a parish church consecrated on September 8, 1722, which was built upon the request of the miners and smelters of the village. The altars of the church are painted by Johann Michael Rottmayr.

== Notable events ==
Flachau hosts the annual Audi FIS Alpine Ski World cup woman's race in winter.

Since 2012, Flachau hosts the minus20degree art and architecture biennale occurring in winter.

== Notable citizens ==
- Hermann Maier (born 1972 in Flachau; Austrian alpine skier, four-time World Cup winner, Olympic gold medalist)
- Claudia Riegler; professional snowboarder (world cup winner, world champion 2015)
- Manuela Riegler; professional snowboarder (world cup winner, world champion 2005)
- Kaspar Steger, Austrian Army Captain (1780–1858); Leader of the Radstadt Fusiliers fighting French and Bavarian Forces in the War of the Fifth Coalition (1809)
