= Me Collectors Room Berlin =

Coordinates: 52°31′37″N 13°23′43″E

Me Collectors Room Berlin, Berlin

me Collectors Room Berlin / Stiftung Olbricht (Olbricht Foundation) was an exhibition space in Berlin, Germany, situated on Auguststrasse 68. Founded by art collector, endocrinologist and heir to Germany's Wella hair-care estate Thomas Olbricht, the space opened its doors on 1 May 2010. Besides showcasing Olbricht's own collection, the me Collectors Room Berlin also provided a platform for presenting other international private collections. The “me” in me Collectors Room Berlin stood for "moving energies".

== Collections and building ==
The 1,300 square metres (14,000 sq ft) venue in Berlin's Mitte district housed Olbricht's permanently installed Wunderkammer (cabinet of curiosities) as well as changing exhibitions of contemporary art drawn from his personal collection or from other international private collectors. The Olbricht collection encompasses several thousand art works (sources vary between 2,500 and 4,000) by 250 artists such as Gerhard Richter, Thomas Demand, Marlene Dumas, Cindy Sherman, Jonas Burgert and Eric Fischl. The me Collectors Room Berlin was funded by the Olbricht Foundation.

The two-story building itself was designed specifically for the needs of the me Collectors Room Berlin by the architectural firm Düttmann + Kleymann in conjunction with Thomas Olbricht. In addition to the exhibition rooms, the building included a shop, a café and residential apartments.

== Exhibitions ==
Besides the permanent Wunderkammer exhibition with over 200 objects from the Renaissance and the Baroque, the me Collectors Room Berlin showed about three contemporary art exhibitions each year. The first exhibition in the me Collectors Room Berlin was held from 1 May to 12 September 2010 and titled Passion Fruits picked from The Olbricht Collection. The show included art works by an equal number of female and male artists to represent the diversity in contemporary art.
