= Tetsuya Umeda =

Japanese performance artist (born 1980)

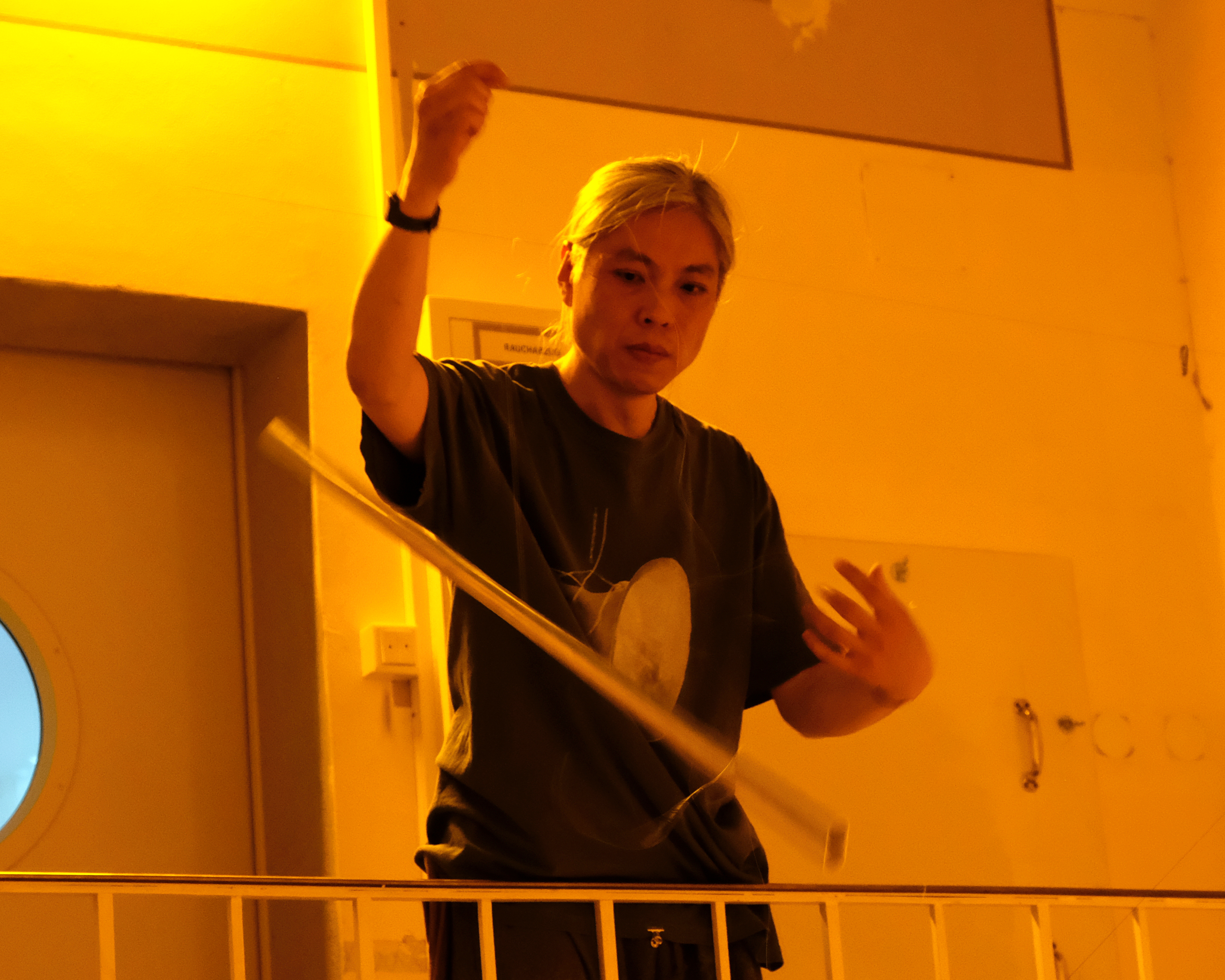
Tetsuya Umeda in 2025

Tetsuya Umeda (Japanese: 梅田哲也, Umeda Tetsuya; born 1980 in Kumamoto) is a Japanese interactive performance artist working with musicians.

Umeda has also participated in the "1st Aichi Triennale 2010: Arts and Cities", Nagoya (2010); "Double Vision: Contemporary Art From Japan”, Moscow Museum of Modern Art, Moscow / Haifa Museum of Art, Haifa (2012); "Simple Interactions. Sound Art from Japan", The Museum of Contemporary Art, Roskilde, Roskilde (2011); and is recently featured at "RhythmScape", Gyoenggi Museum of Modern Art, Gyoenggi (2015) and "Sounds of Us", Trafó Gallery, Budapest (2015–2016).

Solo exhibits include: “Criterium 73: Tetsuya Umeda”, Contemporary Art Gallery, Art Tower Mito (2008), “Hotel New Osorezan”, Ota Fine Arts Singapore, Singapore (2013), “Age0”, Breaker Project, Osaka (2014), “Science of Superstition” SonicProtest Festival, Montreuil (2015).

In 2024 he received the Tokyo Contemporary Art Award.
