= Baku Museum of Modern Art =

Art museum in Baku, Azerbaijan

Coordinates: 40°22′41″N 49°51′53″E

- Established: 20 March 2009
- Location: Yusif Safarov Street 5, Baku, Azerbaijan
- Collection size: 800
- Public transit access: M 2 Şah İsmail Xətai metro station
- Website: www.mim.az

Baku Museum of Modern Art (Azerbaijani: Bakı müasir incəsənət muzeyi) is a museum of modern art located in Baku, Azerbaijan.

== History ==
The museum was built at the initiative of the First Lady of Azerbaijan, Mehriban Aliyeva and opened on 20 March 2009. It was funded by the Heydar Aliyev Foundation, of which the First Lady is head. The foundation has also created projects with the Louvre Museum and the Palace of Versailles. The museum is intended as a focus for an "eco-cultural zone" conceived of by Thomas Krens, former director of the Guggenheim Foundation, that will also include a white-sand beach, a Frank Gehry skyscraper, and a walkway that projects out over the Caspian Sea.

The museum does not have fixed subject areas. The architectural concept of the museum avoids halls with corners and has open passages and walls that meet at different angles, creating a multidimensional perspective of exhibits. Conspicuous metallic structures and the use of the color white unite all parts into a single "moving abstract structure." The chief designer and architect of the museum (2008), collection and exposition (2008-2025) by the artist Altay Sadigzade;

== Displays ==
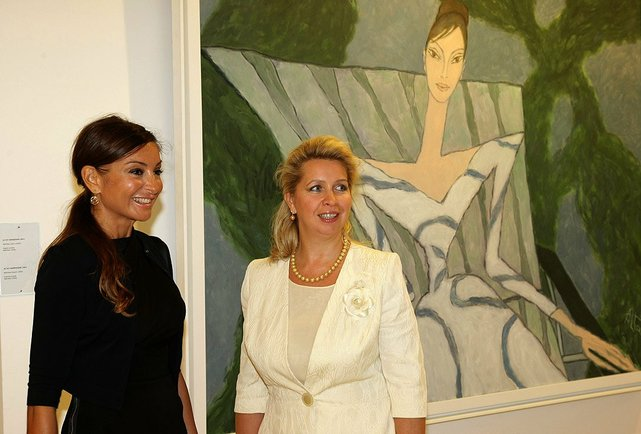
Mehriban Aliyeva and Svetlana Medvedeva visited the museum

The museum focuses on the second half of the twentieth century and contains over 800 works by notable Azerbaijani painters and sculptors, particularly avant garde art of the 1960s and 1970s, including Rasim Babayev, Ashraf Murad, Gennady Brejatjuk, Fazil Najafov, Mamed Mustafaev, Aga Houssejnov, Ali Ibadullaev, Mir-Nadir Zeynalov, Fuad Salayev, Farhad Halilov, Darvin Velibekov, Eldar Mammadov, Mikail Abdurahmanov, Museib Amirov, Mahmud Rustamov, Huseyn Hagverdiyev, Eliyar Alimirzayev, Nazim Rahmanov, Rashad Babayev and Altay Sadikh-zadeh. There are also non-Azerbaijani modern masterworks by Salvador Dalí, Pablo Picasso, and Marc Chagall from private collectors.

Exhibitions of Azerbaijani photographers such as Elnur Babayev, Fakhriya Mammadova, Ilkin Huseynov, Rena Efendi, Sergei Khrustalev, Sitara Ibrahimova, Tahmina Mammadova are often held in the museum.

The museum includes a children's fine arts department, a video hall, a café, a restaurant, a separate hall for private exhibitions, a library, and a bookstore with materials pertaining to world art, architecture and sculpture.

== See also ==
- Azerbaijan State Museum of Art
- Azerbaijan State Carpet Museum
- Azerbaijan State Museum of History
- Shusha Museum of History
