= Werner Lorenz (historian) =

German structural engineer and historian (born 1953)

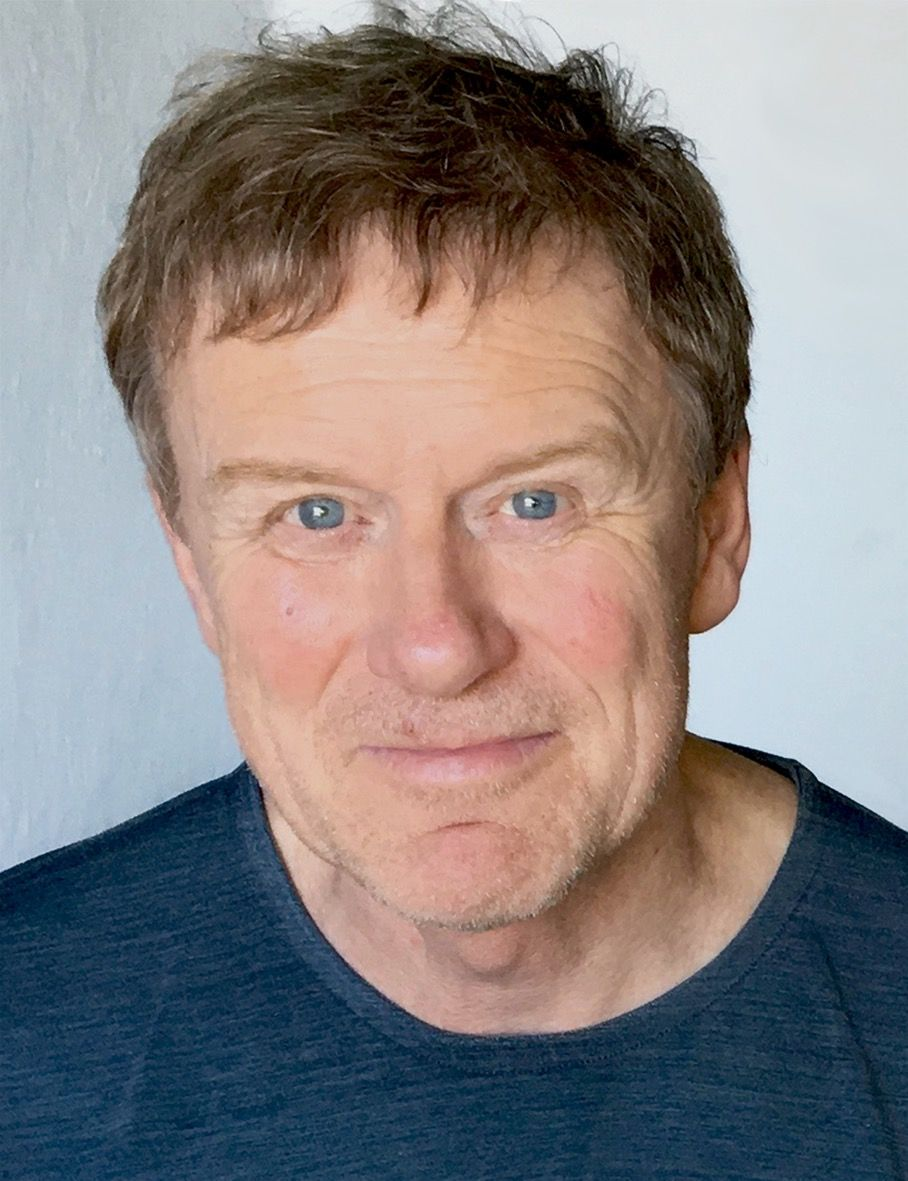
Werner Lorenz

Werner Lorenz (born February 1, 1953, in Osnabrück) is a German structural engineer and a historian of construction technology. He held the chair for the construction history and structural preservation at the BTU Cottbus-Senftenberg, where he has been an honorary professor for the construction history since his retirement. He was also managing director of the Berlin engineering office Lorenz & Co. from 1999 to 2018 (since 2018 Dr. Fischer & Co.).

== Life and education ==
Lorenz was born as the second of five children of an internist in Osnabrück. After graduating from high school in the Gymnasium Carolinum (Osnabrück) in 1971, he studied civil engineering with a specialization in structural engineering at Technische Universität Berlin (TU Berlin) and from 1974 worked as a research assistant in the mechanics department there with Peter Gummert and the chair of structural analysis with Gebhard Hees. At the latter, he wrote his diploma thesis in the field of finite elements in 1980 and then worked until 1984 as a structural engineer in an engineering office in Berlin. From 1983 onwards, he gained craftsmanship in addition to his engineering knowledge by rebuilding an old, destroyed farmhouse in Italy.

Attending a seminar on Nietzsche's The benefits and disadvantages of history for life at the Free University of Berlin (FU Berlin) was the impetus for an intensive examination of the historical context of civil engineering. At the same time, working as a research assistant at Klaus Dierks from the chair of structural engineering at the Faculty of Architecture at Technische Universität Berlin from 1984 to 1989 heightened Lorenz's awareness of the aesthetic dimensions of building structures.

In 1988 he taught as a guest lecturer for the German Academic Exchange Service (DAAD) at the renowned École des ponts ParisTech. At the same time, Lorenz was working on his dissertation on the subject of Building with Iron in the Berlin Area 1797–1850, with which he obtained a PhD in 1992 at the TU Berlin with Klaus Dierks. received his doctorate. The work rated summa cum laude was later published in book form under the title Konstruktion als Kunstwerk: Bauen mit Eisen in Berlin und Potsdam 1797-1850 (Construction as a work of art: Building with iron in Berlin and Potsdam 1797-1850).

In 1993 Werner Lorenz was appointed the first university professor for the construction history in Germany at the Brandenburg University of Technology Cottbus (BTU). Ten years later, the renaming of the chair to Construction History and Structural Preservation also formally reflected his early integration of dealing with historical engineering structures into teaching. Since his retirement in autumn 2018, he has been an honorary professor for the construction history at the BTU Cottbus-Senftenberg.

In addition to his university activities, Werner Lorenz had also regularly worked as a structural engineer and appraiser since the mid-1980s. In 1996 he founded a consultancy for structural engineering which specialises in the structural rehabilition of historic buildings and bridges.

The pioneer for the establishment construction technology in the German research landscape is also one of the leading international representatives of the discipline there under the sign of construction history. In 2009 his chair organized the 3rd International Congress on Construction History.

The early buildings made of iron and steel have largely determined Werner Lorenz's work as a researcher and engineer. In addition, he also devoted himself to numerous other subject areas of engineering construction and the associated context from antiquity to modern times. In 2019, the German Research Foundation appointed him coordinator of the DFG priority program 2255 Cultural Heritage Construction - Basics of an engineering-based and networked monument preservation for the architectural heritage of the ultra-modern, in which history, civil engineering and monument preservation are to be brought together.

Werner Lorenz is chairman and advisory board member in numerous committees, including chairman of the non-profit Vera Gerdau Foundation. Since 2007 he has been organizing the lecture series Practices and Potentials of Construction History at the German Museum of Technology together with Karl-Eugen Kurrer,

== Works ==
- Kurrer, K.-E.; Lorenz, W.: Construction History in Germany; Paris: Classiques Garnier; 2018; pp. 154–246: ISBN 978-2-406-08242-2.
- Kosykh, A.; Lorenz, W; Frommelt, K.: The roof of the Marble Palace in Saint-Petersburg: A structural iron ensemble from the 1770s; Boca Raton; London; New York; Leiden: CRC Press; 2018; pp. 809–817; ISBN 978-1-138-33235-5.
- Luong, T.-M.-H.; Zabel, V.; Lorenz, W.; Rohrmann, R.G.: Vibration-based Model Updating and Identification of Multiple Axial Forces in Truss Structures; Amsterdam: Procedia Engineering/Elsevier; 2017; ISSN 1877-7058.
- Luong, T.-M.-H.; Zabel, V.; Lorenz, W.; Rohrmann, R.G.; Zabel, V.; Said, S.: Finite Element Model Calibration of a Historic Wiegmann–Polonceau Truss Based on Experimental Modal Parameters; Cham: Springer International Publishing; 2017; ISBN 978-3-319-67443-8.
- Konstruktion als Kunstwerk. Bauen mit Eisen in Berlin und Potsdam 1797–1850. Gebr. Mann Verlag, Berlin 1995, ISBN 3-7861-1774-8.
- 200 Jahre Stahlbau in Berlin – Zum Umgang mit Altbauten in Eisen und Stahl. In: Stahlbau. 66, Heft 6, 1997, pp 289–290. (Einführung als Herausgeber).
- with Carsten Seifert, Harald Bodenschatz: Das Finowtal im Barnim: Wiege der brandenburgisch-preußischen Industrie. Hrsg. von der Stadt Eberswalde, Berlin; Transit 1998.
- with B. Szafranski: Ertüchtigung statt Abriß! In: G. Wachter, B. Jäger (Ed.): Abriß oder Ertüchtigung. Vice Versa, Berlin 1999, ISBN 3-9803212-9-0, S. 93–112.
- with Torsten Meyer (Ed.): Technik und Verantwortung im Nationalsozialismus. (= Cottbuser Studien zur Geschichte von Technik, Arbeit und Umwelt. Band 25). Waxmann, 2004, ISBN 3-8309-1407-5, S. 1–18.
- Editor with Karl-Eugen Kurrer, Volker Wetzk: Proceedings of the Third International Congress on Construction History: Brandenburg University of Technology Cottbus, Germany, 20 – 24 May 2009, 3 Volumes, Berlin: Neunplus 1, 2009.
