= Karl-Eugen Kurrer =

German engineer and historian of civil engineering

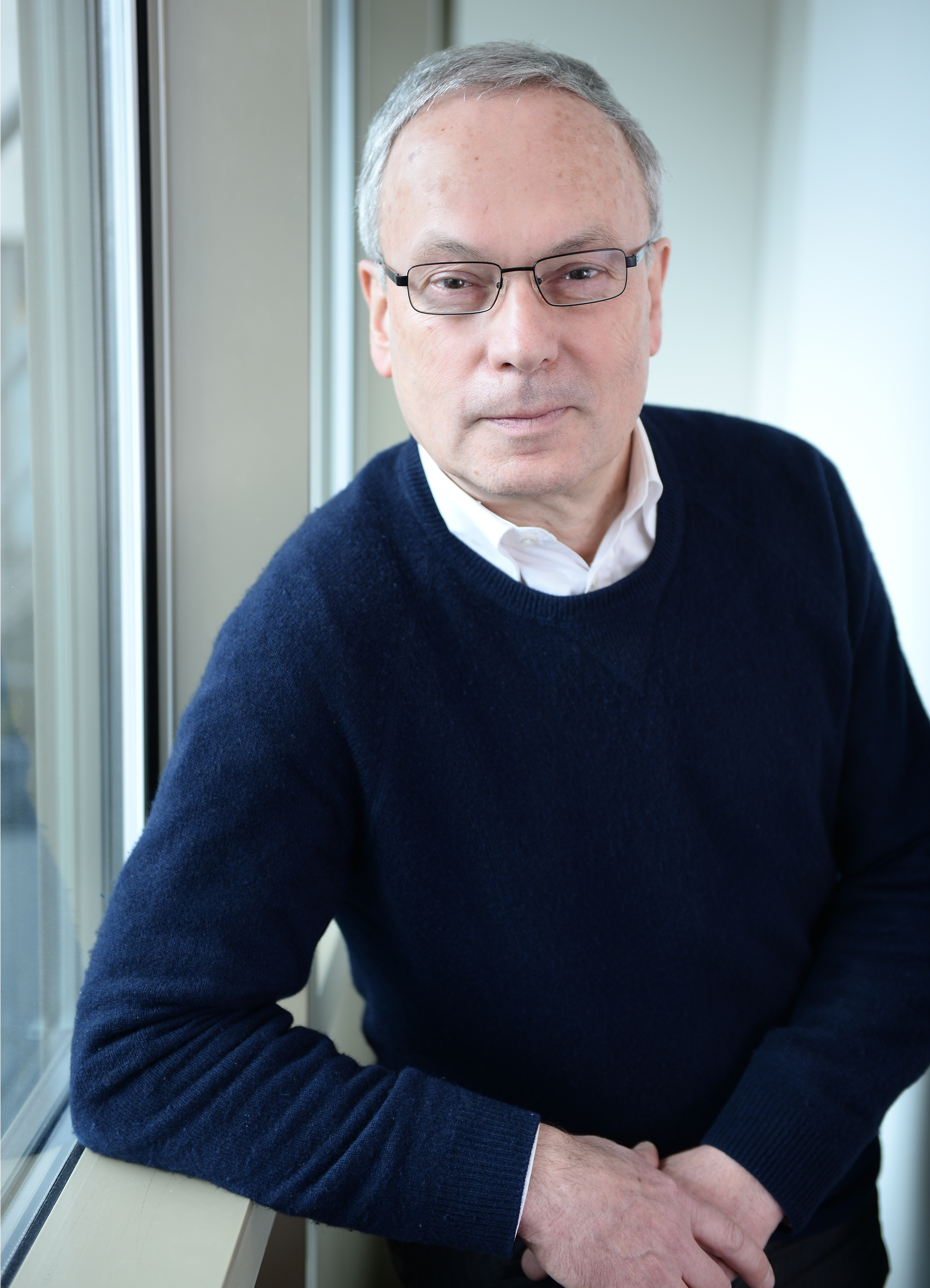
Karl-Eugen Kurrer

Karl-Eugen Kurrer (born 10. August 1952 in Heilbronn) is a German civil engineer and expert on the history of construction.

== Life and education ==
Kurrer attended the primary school wing of Damm School in Heilbronn from 1959 to 1963, thereafter the secondary wing of the same school. He was a pupil of Friedrich Löchner. It was he who coached Kurrer to his secondary school leaving certificate in 1968 and knew how to awaken his interest in German literature. After leaving school and completing a bricklaying apprenticeship with contractor Paul Ensle in Heilbronn, Kurrer studied civil engineering at Stuttgart Technology University of Applied Sciences from 1970 to 1974. During his studies he worked part-time for the Losberger company in Heilbronn (now Losberger De Boer in Bad Rappenau). After completing his studies he worked for Losberger full-time as a structural engineer in the Single-Storey Sheds Department.

In 1974 he was granted a place to study civil engineering and physical engineering sciences at Technische Universität Berlin. He was awarded a diploma for his thesis Entwicklung der Gewölbetheorie vom 19. Jahrhundert bis zum heutigen Stand der Wissenschaft am Beispiel der Berechnung einer Bogenbrücke (development of arch theory from the 19th century to today using the analysis of an arch bridge as an example) in 1981.

Since 1980 his many articles on the history of science and technology in general and construction history in particular have appeared in journals, newspapers, books and exhibition publications.

Kurrer completed his PhD, On the internal kinematic and kinetic of tube vibratory mills, with the highest level of distinction, summa cum laude, at TU Berlin in 1986 and went on to carry out externally funded research on energy efficiency in industry. Working together with Eberhard Gock (1937–2016), Kurrer continued to pursue the topic of his dissertation. He contributed to the development of a new eccentric vibratory mill that uses 50 % less energy than conventional vibratory grinding mills. After 1995 the design successfully established itself on the international machine market (US-Patent & EU-Patent). This new type of mill resulted in Eberhard Gock, head of the research group, and the industrial partner being awarded the Technology Transfer Prize of the Braunschweig Chamber of Commerce and Industry in 1998.

Between 1989 and 1995 Kurrer was employed at the department of antenna design of Telefunken Sendertechnik GmbH (head of department: Peter Bruger) in Berlin as a designer of structural systems for large long-, medium- and short-wave antenna systems. He worked on the further development of the in-house program suite for the calculation, dimensioning and design of cable networks for short-wave antennas according to the theory of large displacements. He contributed to the design of a rotating short-wave curtain antenna (Inventor: Peter Bruger). The aerial was built for the first time three years later as part of a large project.

In 1996 Kurrer was appointed head of the History of Technology Study Group in the Berlin-Brandenburg regional association of the Verein Deutscher Ingenieure (VDI). (Stefan Poser took over this post in late 2003).

From 1 January 1996 to 28 February 2018 Kurrer was editor-in-chief of the journal Stahlbau (Steel Construction) at publishers Ernst & Sohn, a part of Wiley-Blackwell. While in this position he was a key figure in the founding of a new English-language journal, Steel Construction, which in cooperation with the European Convention for Constructional Steelwork (ECCS) has appeared quarterly since 2009 at Ernst & Sohn. Kurrer was responsible for all structural steelwork publications.

Kurrer is a leading expert on the history of construction. Besides writing numerous essays and contributing to several books, he has also compiled an extensive monograph (540pp.), which also appeared in an enlarged English edition (848pp.) for worldwide distribution. In the second, much enlarged, German (1164pp.) and English (June 2018, 1212pp.) editions, Kurrer manages to present the first complete portrayal of the evolution of the theory of structures, including the histories of earth pressure theory and computational statics. Together with Achim Hettler, Kurrer published a book on earth pressure in March 2019, the English edition of which appeared in November 2019. In addition, he contributes to the Neue Deutsche Biographie and the Austrian Biographical Lexicon. Kurrer and Werner Lorenz are the joint editors of the books of the Construction History Series/Edition Bautechnikgeschichte, a series published by Ernst & Sohn.

Since 2002 he has been involved in the organisation of the International Congresses on Construction History. Kurrer – again working with Werner Lorenz, holder of the Chair of Construction History and Structural Preservation at Brandenburg University of Technology Cottbus-Senftenberg – has been organising the series of lectures on The Practices and Potential of Construction History at the German Museum of Technology in Berlin since 2007.

Kurrer was chairman of the scientific committee of the 3rd International Congress on Construction History (20–24 May 2009, Brandenburg University of Technology Cottbus, Germany) and one of the editors of the Proceedings. He held one of the keynote lectures at the 12th International Conference on Metal Structures (15–17 June 2011, University of Wrocław, Poland).

Kurrer was a founding member of the Gesellschaft für Technikgeschichte (History of Technology Society) and also the Gesellschaft für Bautechnikgeschichte (Construction History Society). The homepage of the latter society includes a link to his essay on the duties of construction history. Kurrer has served as a visiting lecturer for the masters course in civil engineering at Coburg University of Applied Sciences since 2018, covering the history of technology in the winter semester.

Since 1980 he has also published numerous journal articles dealing with technology and the engineering and natural sciences in the context of society as a whole. He regularly writes articles for momentum, an online magazine founded in autumn 2012, which cover topics from the histories of science, technology and construction.

== Honours ==
- Kurrer was awarded the Honorary Medal of VDI Berlin-Brandenburg on 1 June 2016.
- Brandenburg University of Technology Cottbus-Senftenberg awarded him an honorary doctorate on 18 October 2017 for his outstanding scientific achievements in the field of construction history.

== Works ==
- Effect of the operation conditions on motion and impact processes in vibratory tube mills. Mineral Processing 27 (1986), No. 10, pp. 546-554. (with E. Gock).
- Development of the rotary chamber vibration mill for industrial use. Mineral Processing 29 (1988), No. 10, pp. 563-570. (with E. Gock and S. Michaelis).
- The outer mechanics of the eccentric vibration mill. International Journal of Mineral Processing 44-45 (1996), pp. 437-446. (with E. Gock and W. Beenken).
- Arch and Vault from 1800 to 1864. In: Arch Bridges. History, analysis, assessment, maintenance and repair, A. Sinopoli (Ed.), pp. 37-42. A. A. Balkema Rotterdam 1998. (with A. Kahlow).
- Eccentric vibratory mills – theory and practice. Powder Technology 105 (1999), pp. 302-310. (with E. Gock).
- Bridge Construction – From the geometric towards the static-constructive approach in bridge design. In: Third International Arch Bridge Conference, C. Abdunur (Ed.), pp. 59-67. Presses de l’école nationale des Ponts et chaussées Paris 2001. (with A. Kahlow and H. Falter).
- Geschichte der Baustatik. Ernst & Sohn, Berlin 2002, ISBN 3-433-01641-0.
- Centrifugal tube mill for finest grinding. International Journal of Mineral Processing, Vol. 74, 10. Dec. 2004, Special Issue Supplement Comminution 2002, Issue 1, edited by K. S. E. Forssberg, pp. S75-S83. (with E. Gock, V. Vogt and R. Florescu).
- Grace and law: The spatial framework from Föppl to Mengeringhausen. In: Essays in the history of theory of structures. In honour of Jacques Heyman, ed. by S. Huerta, pp. 235-271. Madrid: Instituto Juan de Herrera 2005.
- The History of the theory of structures. From arch analysis to computational mechanics. Ernst & Sohn, Berlin 2008, ISBN 978-3-433-01838-5.
- Werner Lorenz (2012), Karl-Eugen Kurrer 60 Jahre, Stahlbau (in German), 81 (9), pp. 731–732, doi:10.1002/stab.201290127, ISSN 1437-1049
- Philosophy and structural engineering. In: Mechanics and Architecture between Epistéme and Téchne, ed. by Anna Sinopoli, pp. 179-206. Roma: Edizioni di Storia e Letteratura 2010.
- The art of major bridge-building – Hellmut Homberg and his contribution to multiple cable-stayed spans. Steel Construction – Design and Research 5 (2012), No. 4, pp. 251-265. (with E. Pelke)
- On the evolution of steel-concrete composite construction. In: Proceedings of the Fifth International Congress on Construction History, June 3-7, 2015, Chicago, ed. by B. Bowen, D. Friedman, Th. Leslie and J. Ochsendorf, Vol. 3, pp. 107-116. Atlanta (Illinois): Construction History Society of America 2015. (with E. Pelke)
- Geschichte der Baustatik. Auf der Suche nach dem Gleichgewicht, 2., stark erw. Auflage, Ernst & Sohn, Berlin 2016, ISBN 978-3-433-03134-6
- Construction History in Germany. In: L’Histoire de la construction/Construction History. Relevé d’un chantier européen/Survey of a European Building Site. Sous la direction d’Antonio Becchi, Robert Carvais et Joël Sakarovitch, Tome I, pp. 195-246. Paris: Classique Garnier 2018. (with W. Lorenz)
- The History of the Theory of Structures. Searching for Equilibrium. Construction History Series/Edition Bautechnikgeschichte, ed. by Karl-Eugen Kurrer and Werner Lorenz. Ernst & Sohn, Berlin 2018 (with biography, pp. XXVIII–XXIX), ISBN 978-3-433-03229-9
- Earth Pressure. Ernst & Sohn, Berlin 2020, ISBN 978-3-433-03223-7 (with A. Hettler)
- Kurt Beyers Beitrag zur Baustatik. In: Beton- und Stahlbetonbau 115 (2020), Heft 1, S. 62–80, ISSN 0005-9900.
- Die Kunst der Technik. Bauingenieure in Deutschland / The art of engineering. Civil and structural engineers in Germany. In: Ingenieurbaukunst – Engineering Made in Germany, hrsgn. v. d. Bundesingenieurkammer, pp. 16–25. Ernst & Sohn, Berlin 2020, ISBN 978-3-433-03326-5. (with B. Hauke)
