= Construction History Society =

British learned society

The society's journal, Construction History.

The Construction History Society (not to be confused with the Construction History Society of America) is a learned society that promotes the international study of the history of construction. Though based in Britain, it has an international membership of academics and construction professionals, who are interested in the history of construction of all countries and particularly how those histories inter-relate. A key aim is the preservation of the primary records of construction companies and individuals.

Construction history is not the same as architectural history, the society's interests include:

- What techniques did the builders employ?
- What materials were used and who were the people using them?
- How much did they cost?
- What lessons can be learnt from them?

The society publishes a peer-reviewed journal – Construction History – twice a year; and a magazine – The Construction Historian – usually twice a year. It hosts an annual conference at the University of Cambridge and supports the triennial international congresses of its sister organisations worldwide.

The society has approximately 350 individual members, drawn from all parts of the world, plus many institutional subscribers, and is managed by a board of trustees, all of whom give their time freely. The society is a registered charity with its registered address as the Faculty of Architecture and History of Art at the University of Cambridge.

== History ==
The society was formed as the Construction History Group in 1983, but later changed its name to the Construction History Society. It has sponsored three international conferences on the history of construction at Queens' College, Cambridge and the larger University of Cambridge, supported by the Cambridge School of Architecture, in 2014, 2015, and 2016. The society is a registered charity.

The chairman is Dr. James W.P. Campbell of the University of Cambridge.

== Journal ==
The society has published a peer-reviewed journal, Construction History, since 1985 which is abstracted and indexed in the Arts & Humanities Citation Index, SCOPUS and the Web of Science.
