= History of construction =

The history of construction traces the changes in building tools, methods, techniques and systems used in the field of construction. It explains the evolution of how humans created shelter and other structures that comprises the entire built environment. It covers several fields including structural engineering, civil engineering, city growth and population growth, which are relatives to branches of technology, science, history, and architecture. The fields allow both modern and ancient construction to be analyzed, as well as the structures, building materials, and tools used.

Construction is an ancient human activity that began at around 4000 BC as a response to the human need for shelter. It has evolved and undergone different trends over time, marked by a few key principles: durability of the materials used, increase in building height and span, the degree of control exercised over the interior environment, and finally, the energy available for the construction process.

== Prehistoric Era ==
=== Stone Age ===
Humans during the Paleolithic era were hunter-gatherers. Their nomadic lifestyle led to temporary and short-lived buildings leading to a lack of surviving evidences of construction. However, it is believed that the earliest evidence of construction in the world is the 1.8 million year-old stone circle found at Olduvai Gorge representing the remains of a windbreak.

By the Mesolithic era, humans started to develop agriculture. Hunter-gatherers built temporary shelter for hunters who would ambush their prey. Currently, the first evidence of man-made shelter dates back to 400,000 B.C. in Terra Amata, France which served as housing for hunters.

==== Neolithic Era ====
By the Neolithic era, also known as the New Stone Age, humans developed agriculture and started to cultivate plants and domesticate animals. This change from the nomadic lifestyle meant that humans started building walls and forming cities. In addition to living in caves and using rock shelters, the first buildings were simple tents, like the Inuit's tupiq, and huts. Huts were built as protection from the elements like pit-houses, and as fortifications for safety like crannog.

Their shelters were built self-sufficiently by their inhabitants rather than by specialist builders, using locally available materials and traditional designs and methods. Because of this, what little can be said about very early construction is mostly conjecture and based on vernacular architecture or what is known about the way nomadic hunter-gatherers and herdsmen in remote areas build shelters today. For example, the first bridges made by humans were probably simple wooden logs placed across a stream and later on evolved into timber trackways.

===== Building materials and tools =====
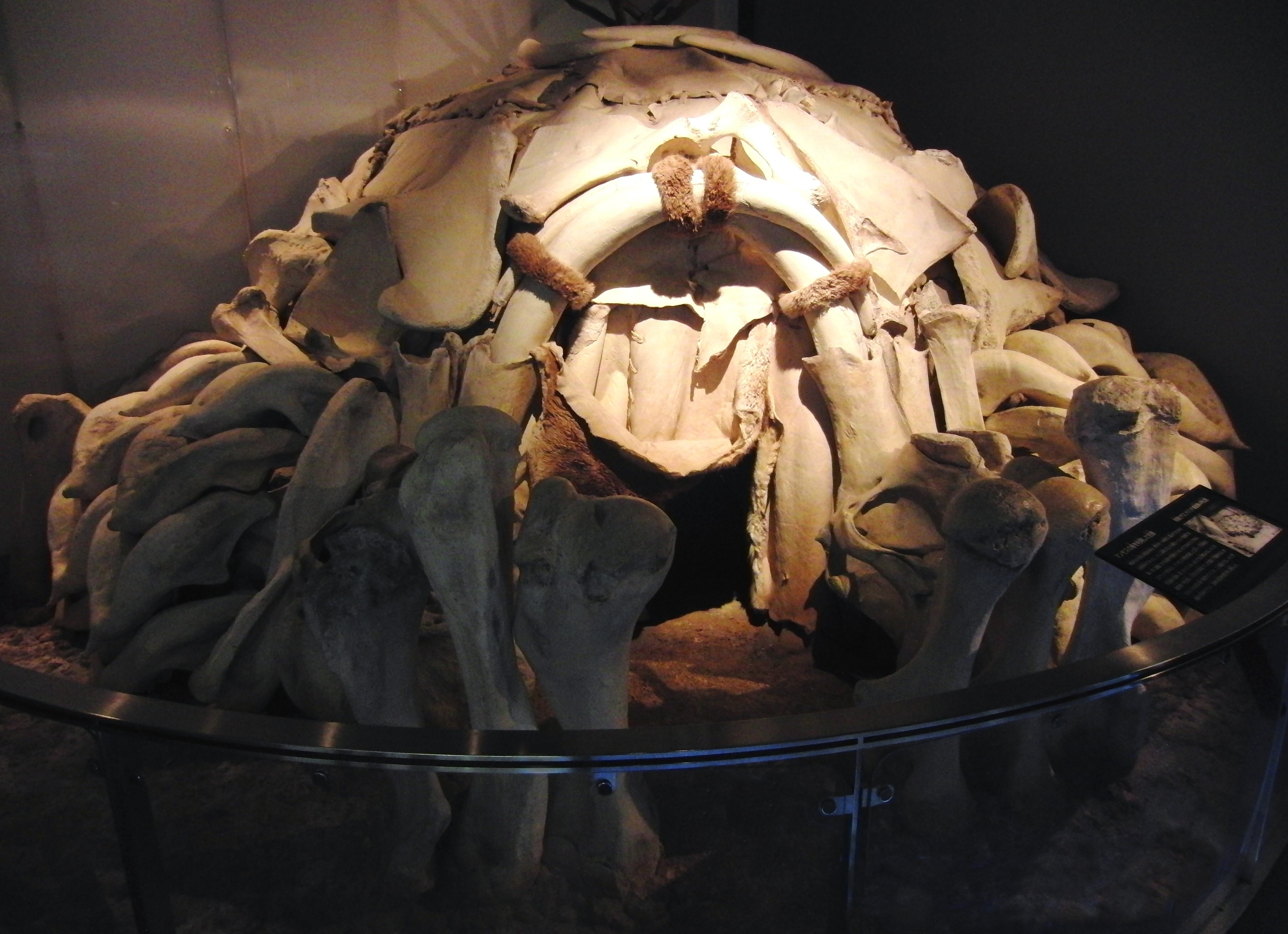
A reconstruction of a pit-house type dwelling constructed by pre-historic man attributed to Cro-Magnon with mammoth bones. Reconstruction based on the example of Mezhirich, upper Paleolitic site. Exhibit in the National Museum of Nature and Science, Tokyo, Japan.

Pre-historic humans made tools out of bone, ivory, antler, hide, stone, wood, grass, metals (gold, copper and silver) and animal fibers. Various tools for cutting (hand axe, chopper, adze and celt), scrape or chop (flake tool), and tools to pound, pierce, roll, pull and lever were made and used. As building materials, they used bones such as mammoth ribs, hide, stone, metal, bark, bamboo, and animal dung.

Pre-historic humans also used bricks and lime plaster as building materials. For example, mud bricks and clay mortar dated to 9000 BC were found in Jericho. These mudbricks were formed with the hands rather than wooden moulds and herringbone pattern were made by the brick-maker's thumbs.

===== Building techniques =====
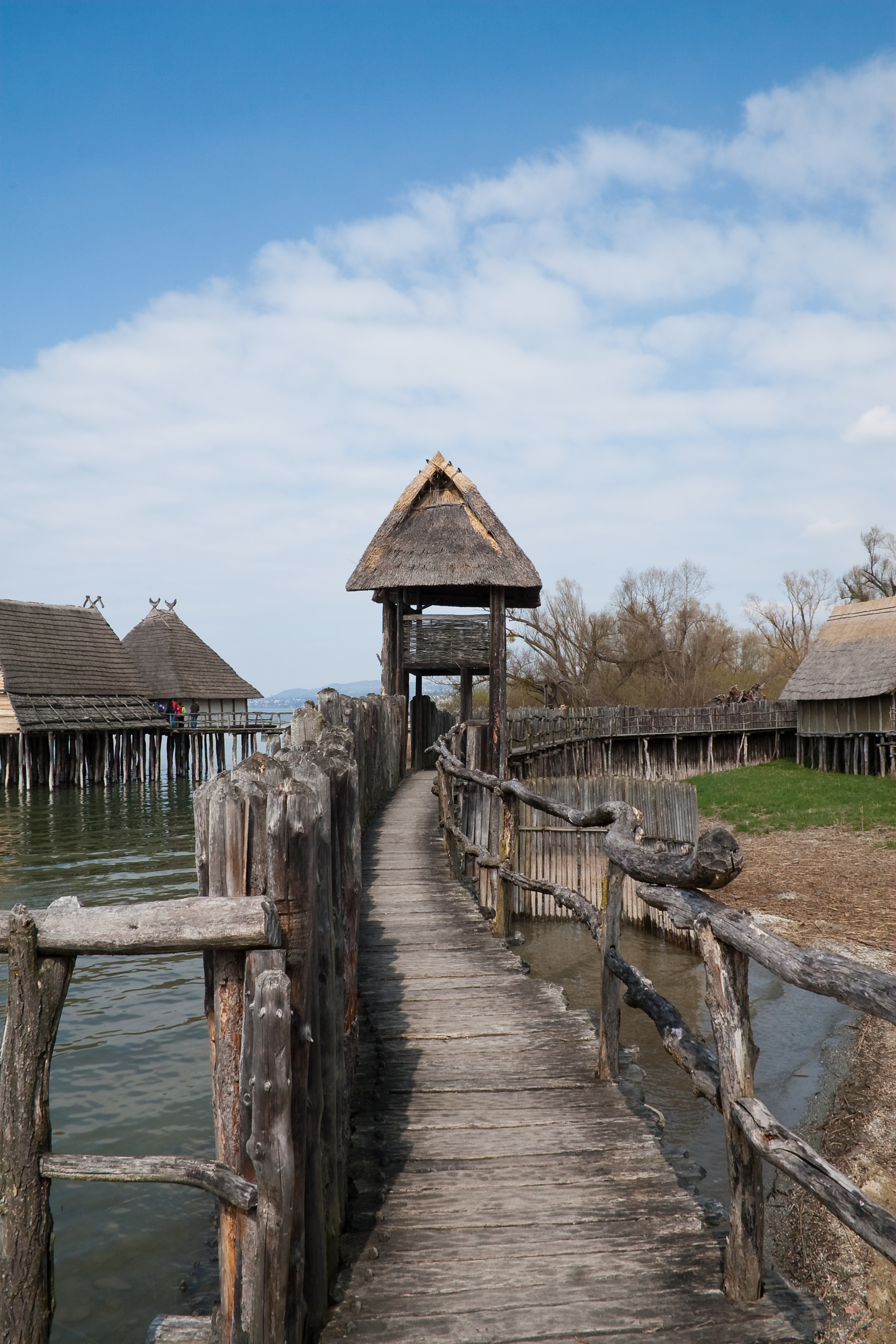
A reconstruction of a Neolithic fortified village showing a palisade wall and stilt houses at the Pfahlbau Museum Unteruhldingen, Germany

The absence of metal tools placed limitations on the materials that could be worked, but it was still possible to build quite elaborate stone structures with ingenuity using dry stone walling techniques such as those found at Skara Brae in Scotland, Europe's most complete Neolithic village. Another example of a settlement built in the Neolithic is the Göbekli Tepe. It is made with T-shaped limestone pillars carved out using flint points and other rock-cut architecture methods. The corbelled roof of Newgrange (c. 3,200 BC) shows that corbel arches were used since the Neolithic age.

One of the largest structures of this period was the Neolithic long house. It was a long, narrow timber dwelling built by the first farmers in Europe at least as early as 5000 to 6000 BC. Like all timber-framed and log structures (stilt houses) in early cultures, only the very lowest parts of the walls and post holes are unearthed in archaeological excavations; making reconstruction of the upper parts of these buildings largely conjectural.

The most remarkable Neolithic structure in Western Europe is the iconic megalith known as Stonehenge, regarded by some archaeologists as displaying methods of timber construction such as at woodhenge translated into stone, a process known as petrification. The now ruinous remains are of post and lintel construction and include massive sandstone lintels which were located on supporting uprights by means of mortise and tenon joints; the lintels themselves being end-jointed by the use of tongue and groove joints. There is also evidence of prefabrication of the stonework; the symmetrical geometric arrays of stone clearly indicate that the builders of Stonehenge had mastered sophisticated surveying methods.

==== Gallery of Neolithic tools ====
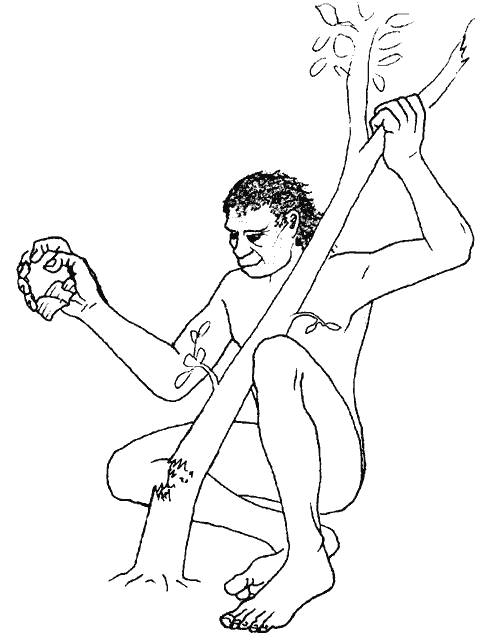
Man using a hand axe

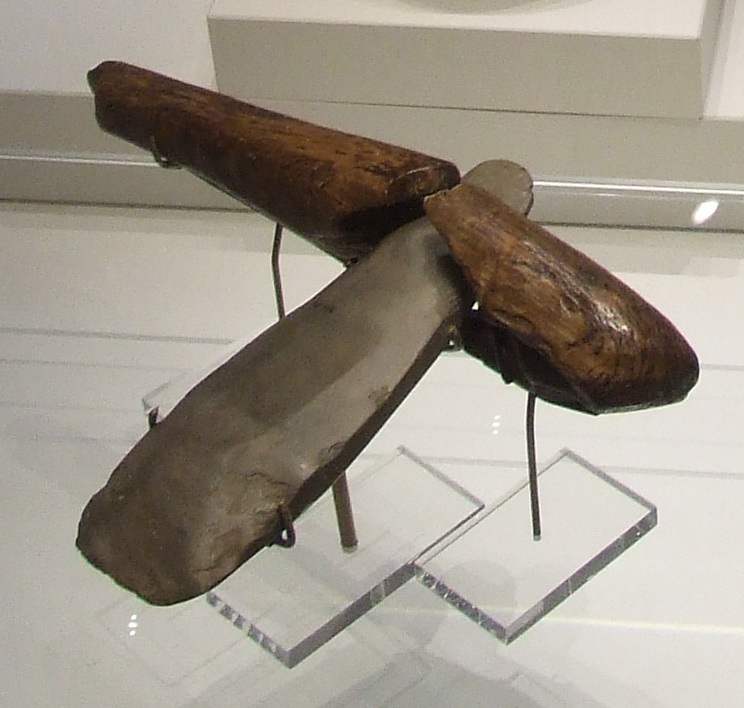
A Neolithic stone axe with a wooden handle

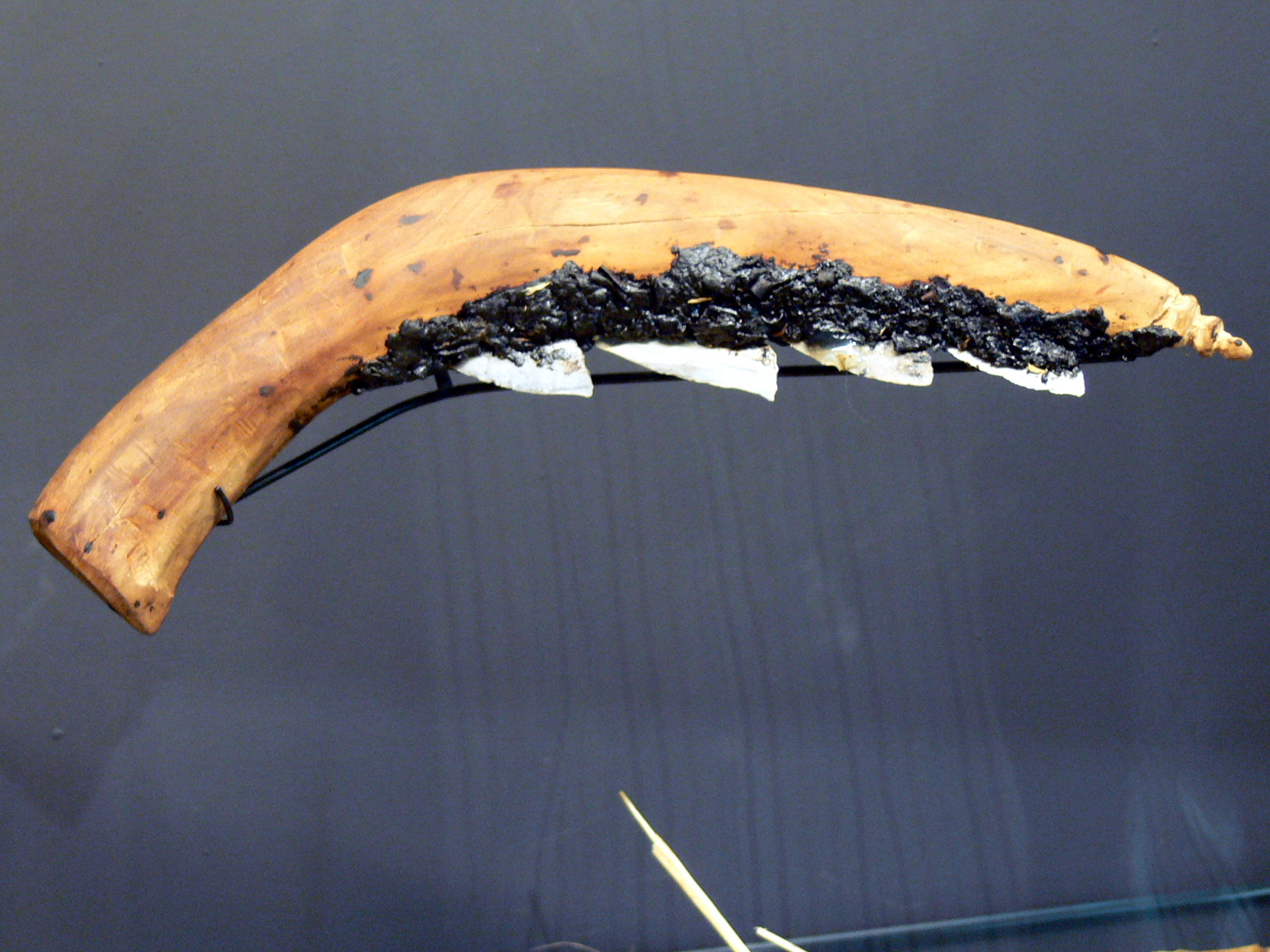
A sickle for harvesting crops and thatching materials

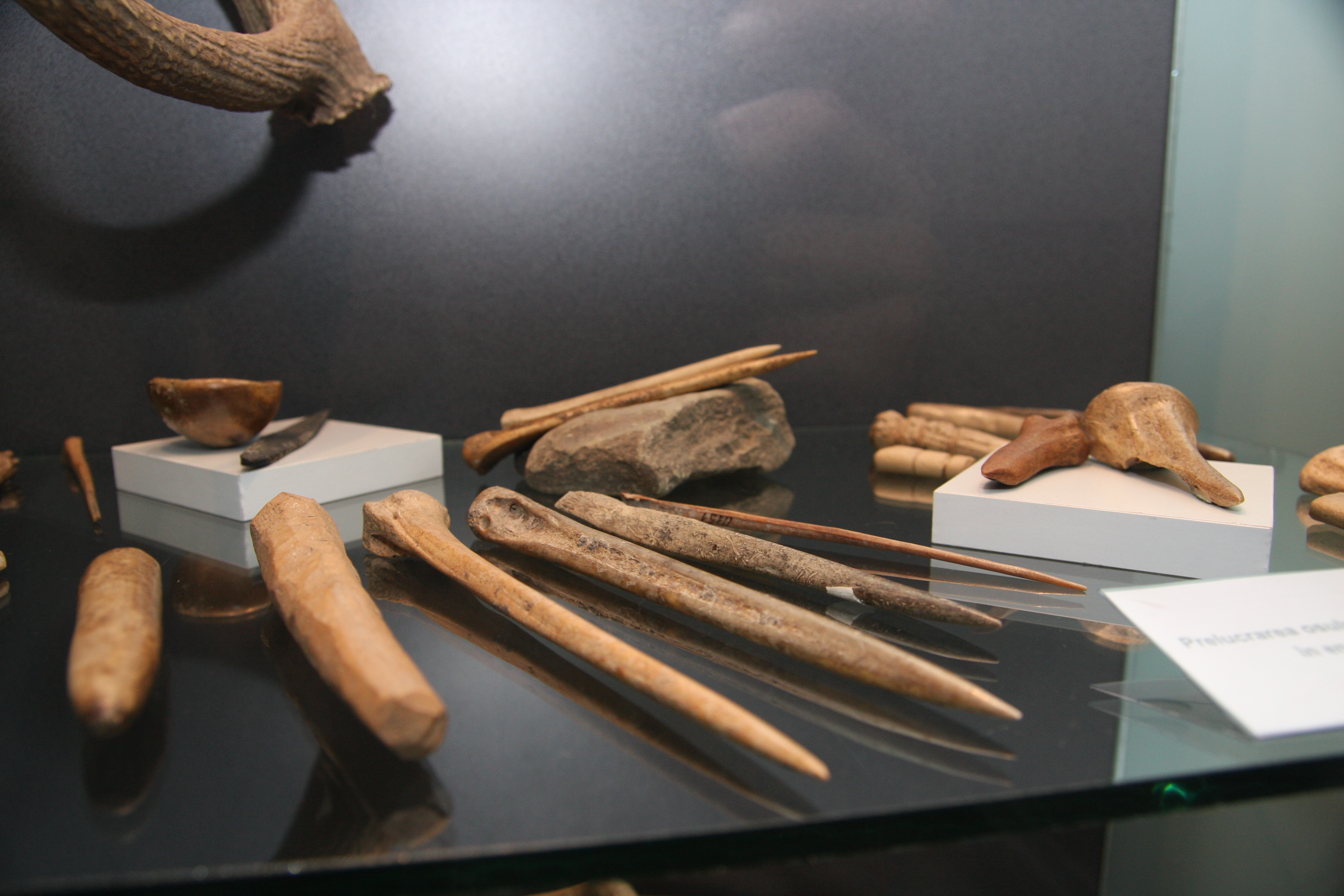
Various bone tools from China

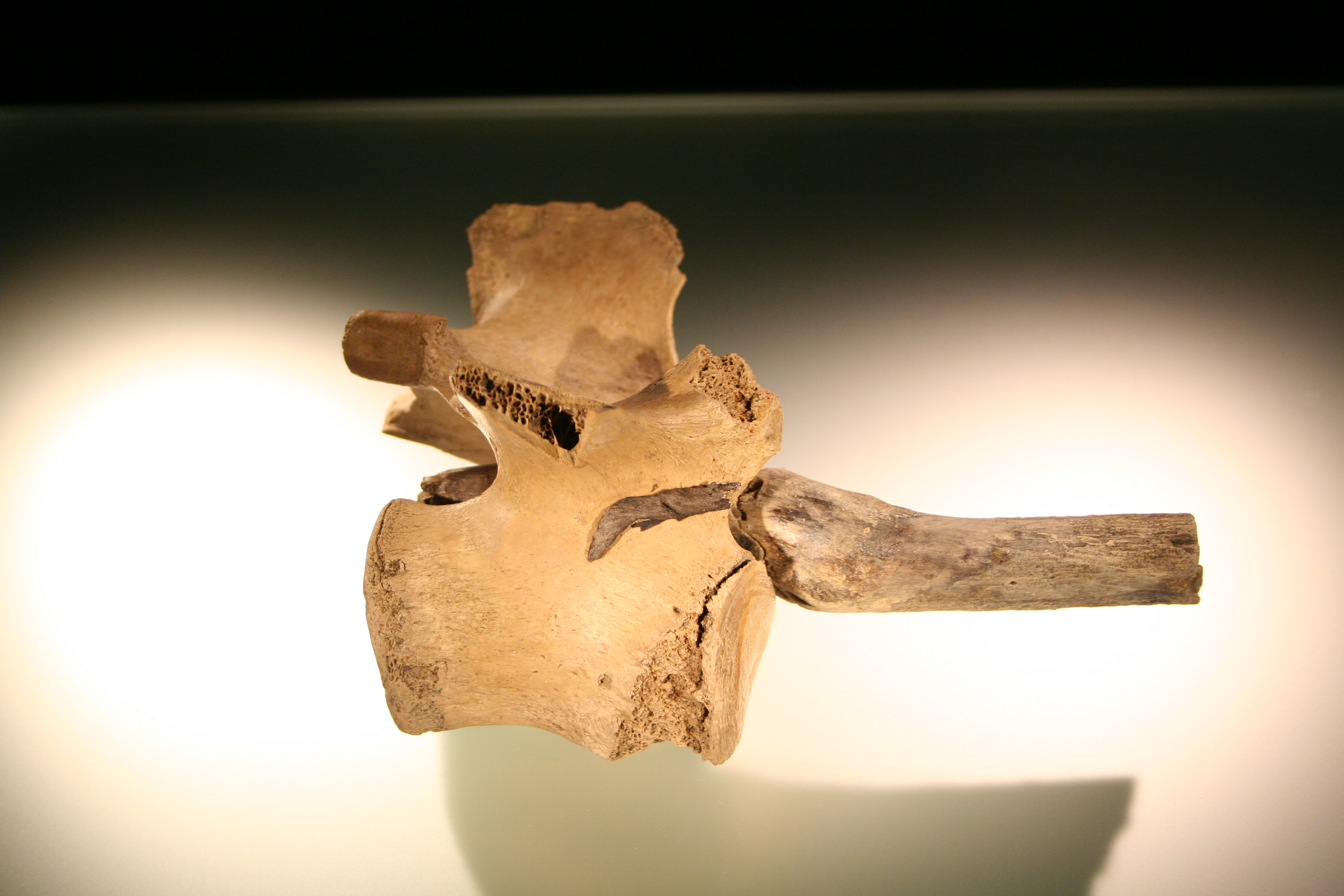
Bone hammer from the Linear Pottery Culture

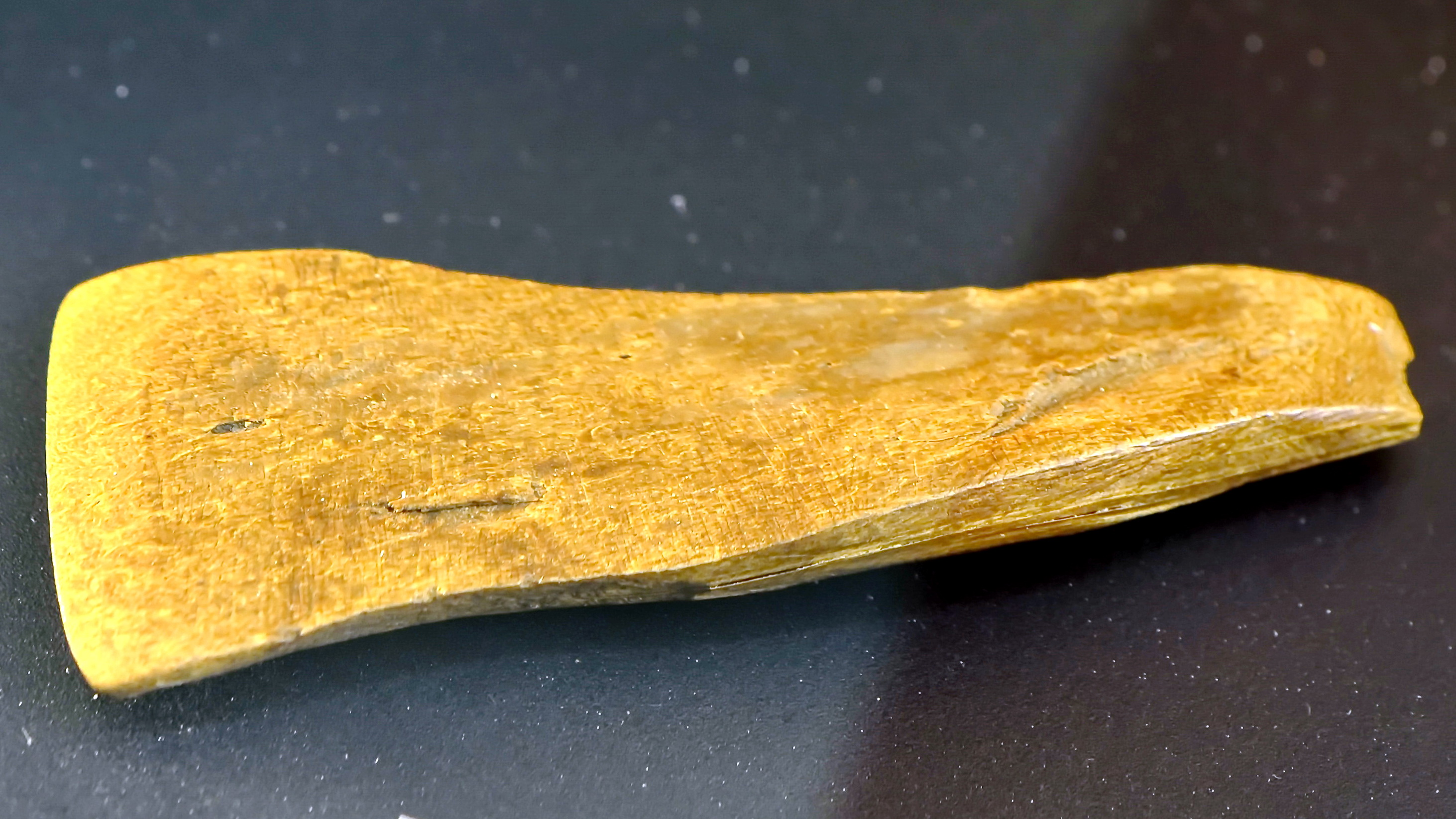
A chisel made of bone, Sechseläutenplatz

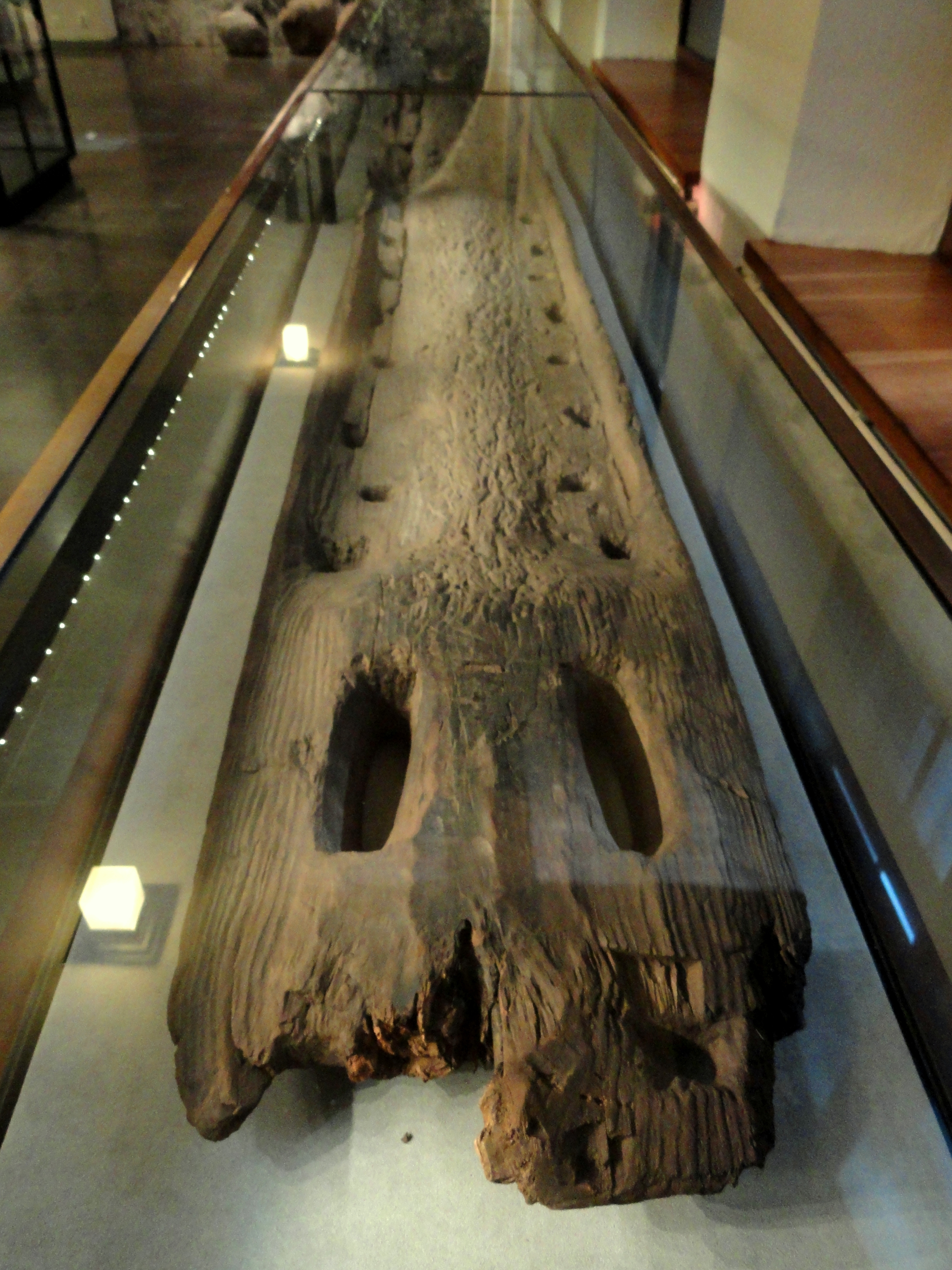
A sledge for moving heavy materials

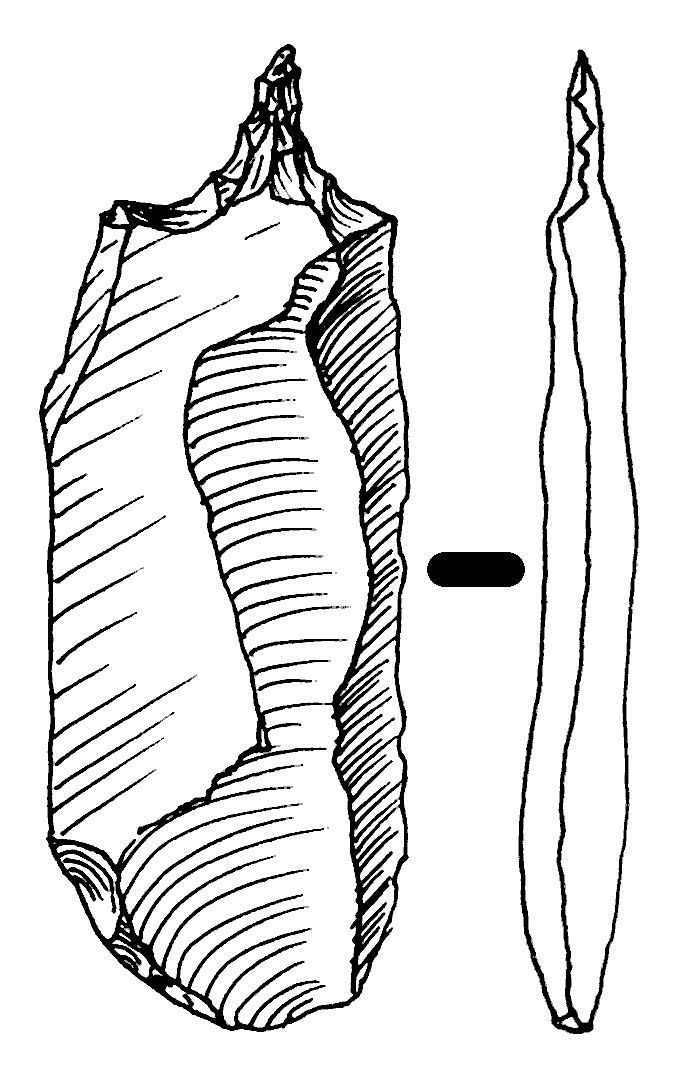
A stone drill

=== Copper Age and Bronze Age ===
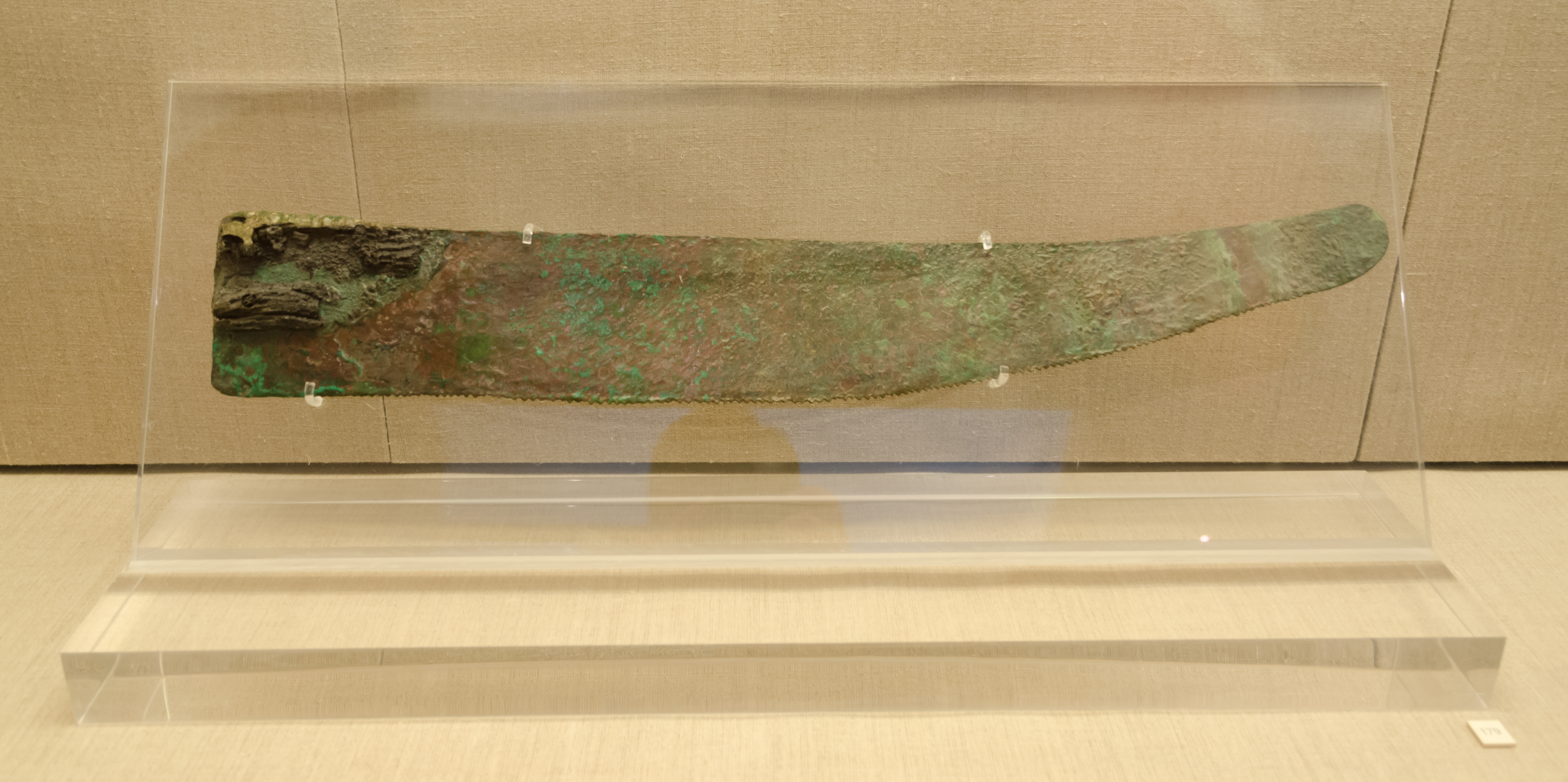
A bronze saw from the archaeological site of Akrotiri - Museum of prehistoric Thera - Santorini, Greece. Image: Norbert Nagel / Wikimedia Commons

Copper came into use before 5,000 BC and was one of the early metals used by humans for producing tools, alongside gold, silver and lead. Unrefined copper was malleable, tough, strong, resistant to corrossion and much more versatile than stone causing a shift in preference of tool-making material. During this period, the saw was developed and was used as a building tool.

At around 3,100 BC, humans started experimenting with metals and forming alloys such as bronze (made when tin is added to copper) and brass (made when zinc is added to copper). Bronze could be cast into desired shapes and, if damaged, could be recast increasing the types of tools developed in this period. Copper and bronze were used for the same types of tools as stone but the less brittle, more durable material cut better. These advantages caused the switch from stone tools to metal tools. Both were also used to "harden" the cutting edge of tools such as the Egyptians using copper and bronze points for working soft stone including quarrying blocks and making rock-cut architecture.

During the Copper Age, the ancient Chinese invented fired bricks as early as 4400BC. In Chengtoushan, fired bricks were used as flooring for houses. Clay was also used as sewer pipes by the Mesopotamians at around 4000 BC, with the earliest examples found in the Temple of Bel in Babylonia. Latrines in the city of Uruk have raised fired brick foot platforms at around 3200 BC. Mudbricks faced were burnt brick set in bitumen were used to originally construct the Ziggurat of Ur.

The wheel was invented by the Sumerians in the Copper Age but it was not until around 3500 BC when it was used in transportation. Heavy loads were moved on boats, sledges (a primitive sled) or on rollers. The oldest-preserved measuring rod made of copper-alloy bar dates to 2650 BC and was found at the Sumerian city, Nippur (modern-day Iraq)

The post and lintel construction method was popularized by the Egyptians at around 3100 BC to build temples such as the Great Pyramid of Giza(c. 2560). This technique was later adapted by the Greek, as seen in the Tomb of Agamemnon (c.1250 BC), and by the Romans. Cyclopean masonry used in the Arkadiko Bridge, was also widely used by the Mycenean.

=== Iron Age ===
The Iron Age began around 1200 BC and ended at around 500 BC. Humans may have smelted iron sporadically throughout the Bronze Age but was thought to be an inferior metal because iron tools and weapons weren't as hard or durable as bronze counterparts. It was not until the creation of steel, combining iron and carbon, that iron became prominent. Steel can be hardened and tempered producing a sharp, durable cutting edge allowing for the creating of better tools such as hammers, chisels, knives and axes.

The most common type of building during the Iron Age the present-day United Kingdom were roundhouses. These were made from stone or wooden posts joined by wattle-and-daub panels topped with a conical thatched roof. Archeologists presume that the walls were made of timber planking using a side ax to remove excess timber.

== Civilizations ==
=== Ancient Mesopotamia ===
The earliest large-scale buildings for which evidence survives have been found in ancient Mesopotamia. The smaller dwellings only survive in traces of foundations, but the later civilizations built very sizeable structures in the forms of palaces, temples and ziggurats and took particular care to build them out of materials that last, which has ensured that very considerable parts have remained intact. Major technical achievement is evidenced by the construction of great cities such as Uruk and Ur. The Ziggurat of Ur is an outstanding building of the period, despite major reconstruction work. Another fine example is the ziggurat at Chogha Zanbil in modern Iran. Cities created demands for new technologies such as drains for animal and human sewage and paved streets.

Archaeological evidence has shown the existence of pitched-brick vaults such as at Tell al-Rimah in what is now Iraq.

==== Building techniques and materials ====
The chief building material was the mud-brick, formed in wooden moulds similar to those used to make adobe bricks. Bricks varied widely in size and format from small bricks that could be lifted in one hand to ones as big as large paving slabs. Rectangular and square bricks were both common. They were laid in virtually every bonding pattern imaginable and used with considerable sophistication. Drawings survive on clay tablets from later periods showing that buildings were set out on brick modules. By 3500 BC, fired bricks came into use and surviving records show a very complex division of labour into separate tasks and trades. Fired bricks and stone were used for pavement.

Life in general was governed by complex ritual and this extended to rituals for setting-out buildings and moulding the first bricks. Contrary to popular belief the arch was not invented by the Romans, but was used in these civilizations. The later Mesopotamian civilizations, particularly Babylon and thence Susa, developed glazed brickwork to a very high degree, decorating the interiors and exteriors of their buildings with glazed brick reliefs, examples of which survive in the Tehran archaeological museum, the Louvre Museum in Paris and the Pergamon Museum in Berlin.

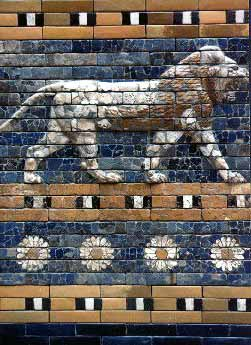
Detail of the Ishtar Gate (575 BC) showing the exceptionally fine glazed brickwork of the later period. Glazed bricks have been found from the 13th century BC

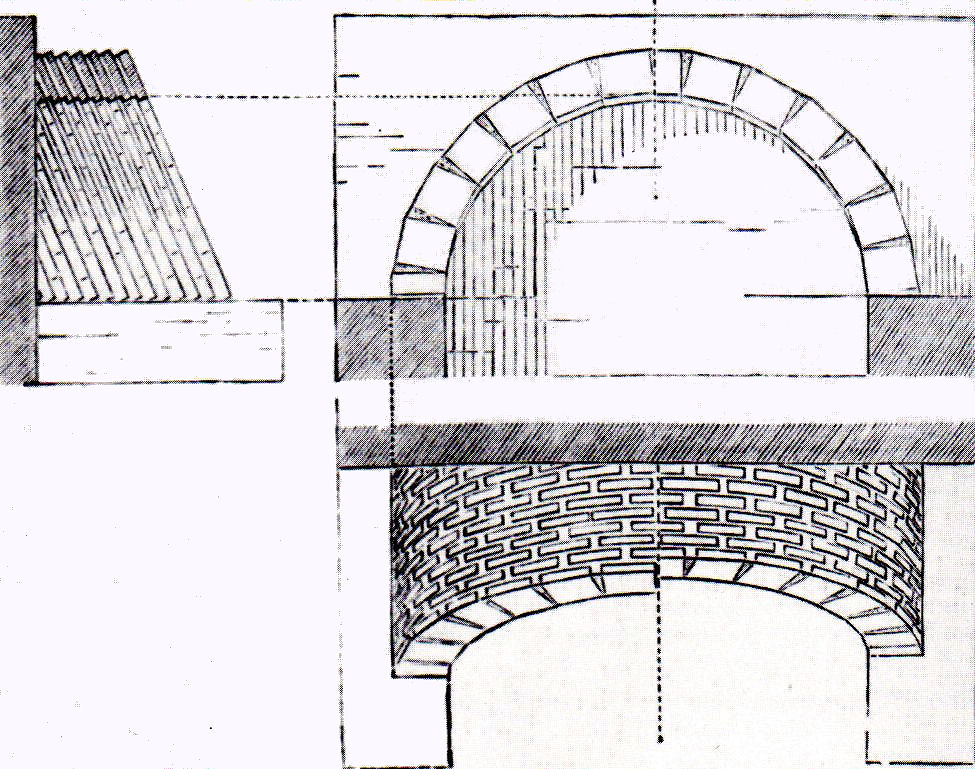
The pitched-brick vault is a type found in Mesopotamia circa 2000 BC.

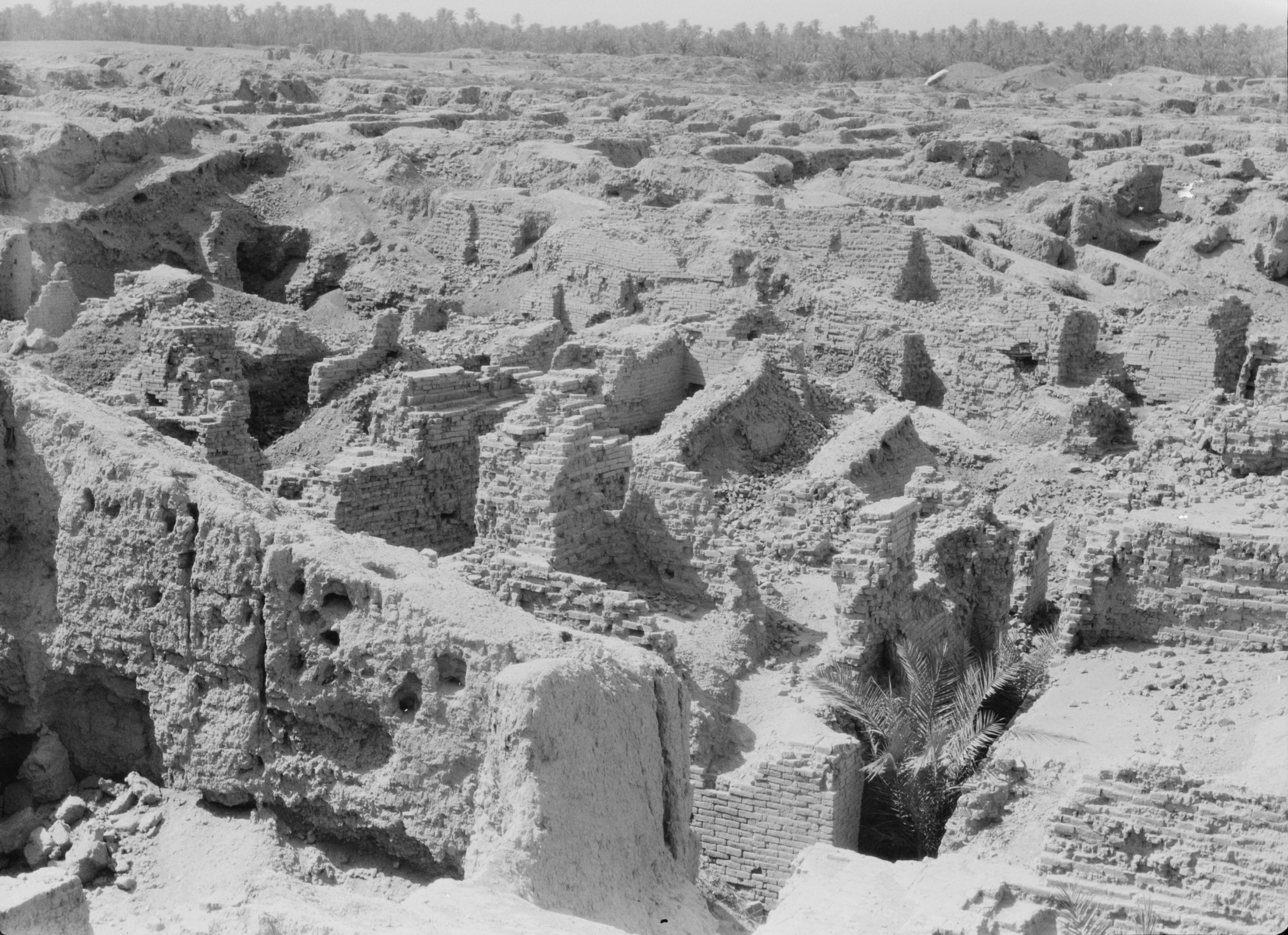
Babylon, the archaeological site in 1932, before major reconstruction work undertaken by Sadam Hussein

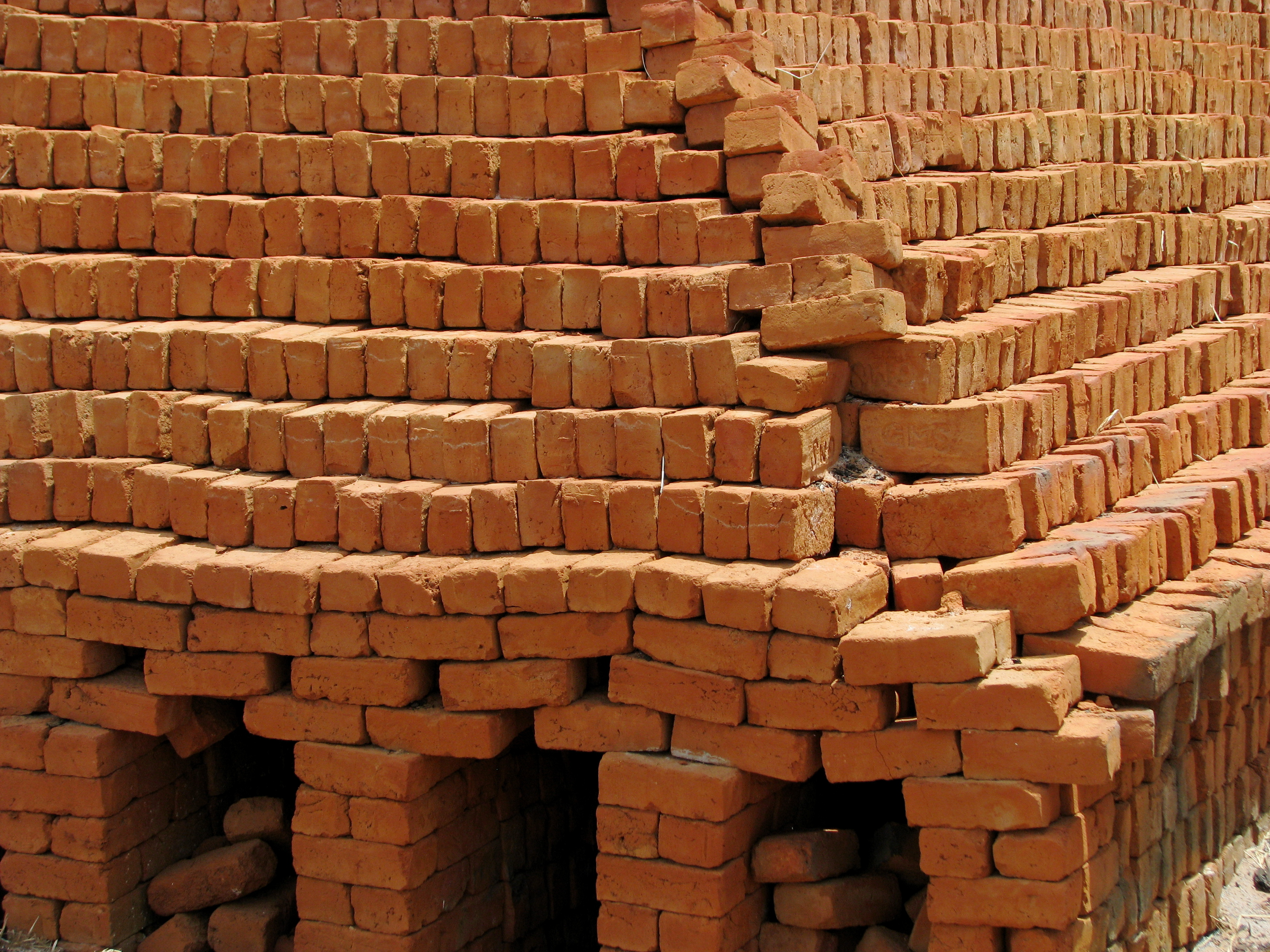
Dried bricks stacked ready for firing without the use of a kiln

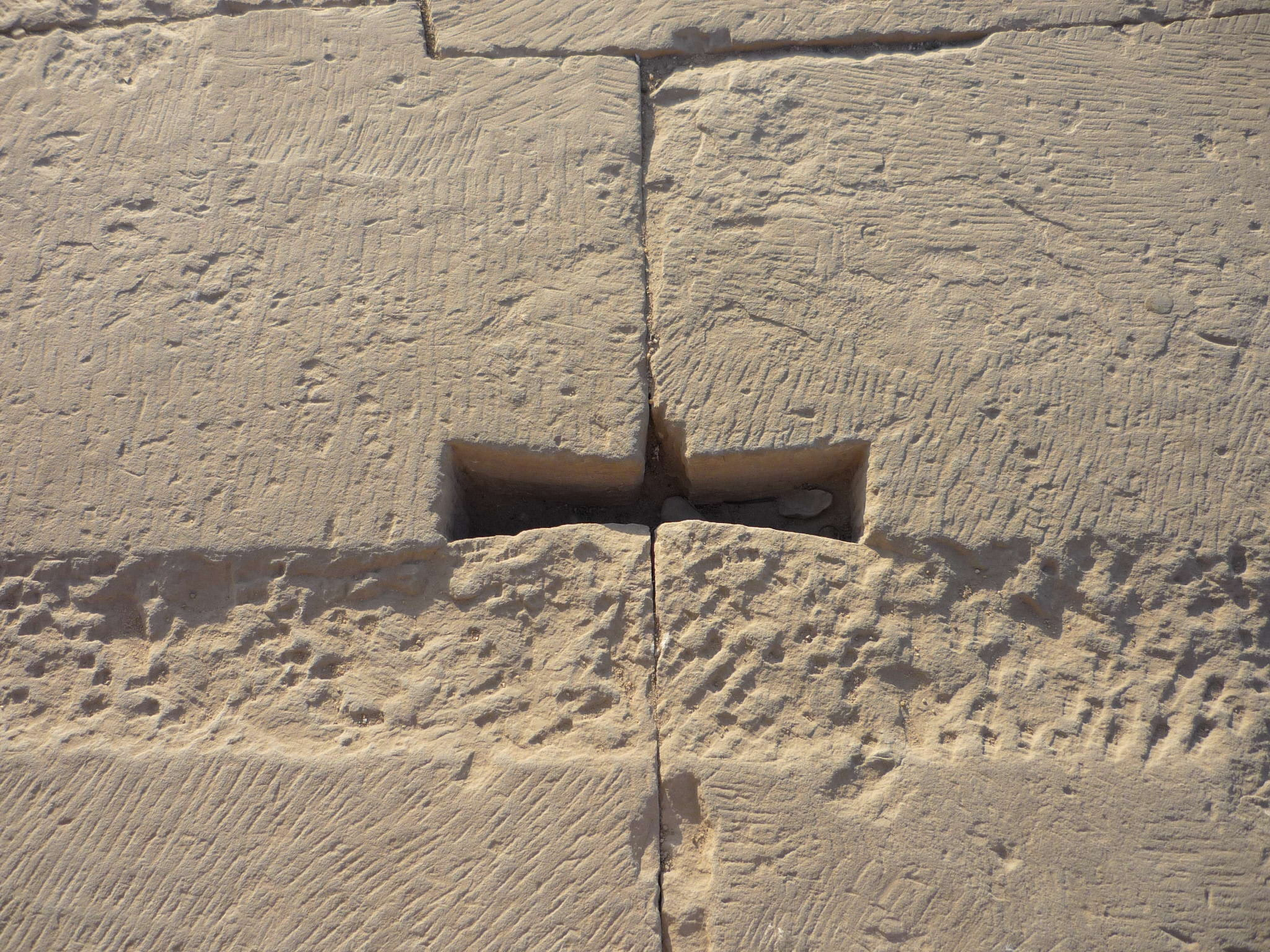
Egyptian stonework showing tool marks and butterfly interlocks in the Temple of Kom Ombo begun 180-145 BC

==== Building Code ====
The Code of Hammurabi by the Babylonians of Ancient Mesopotamia is known to contain the earliest written building code.

=== Ancient Egypt ===
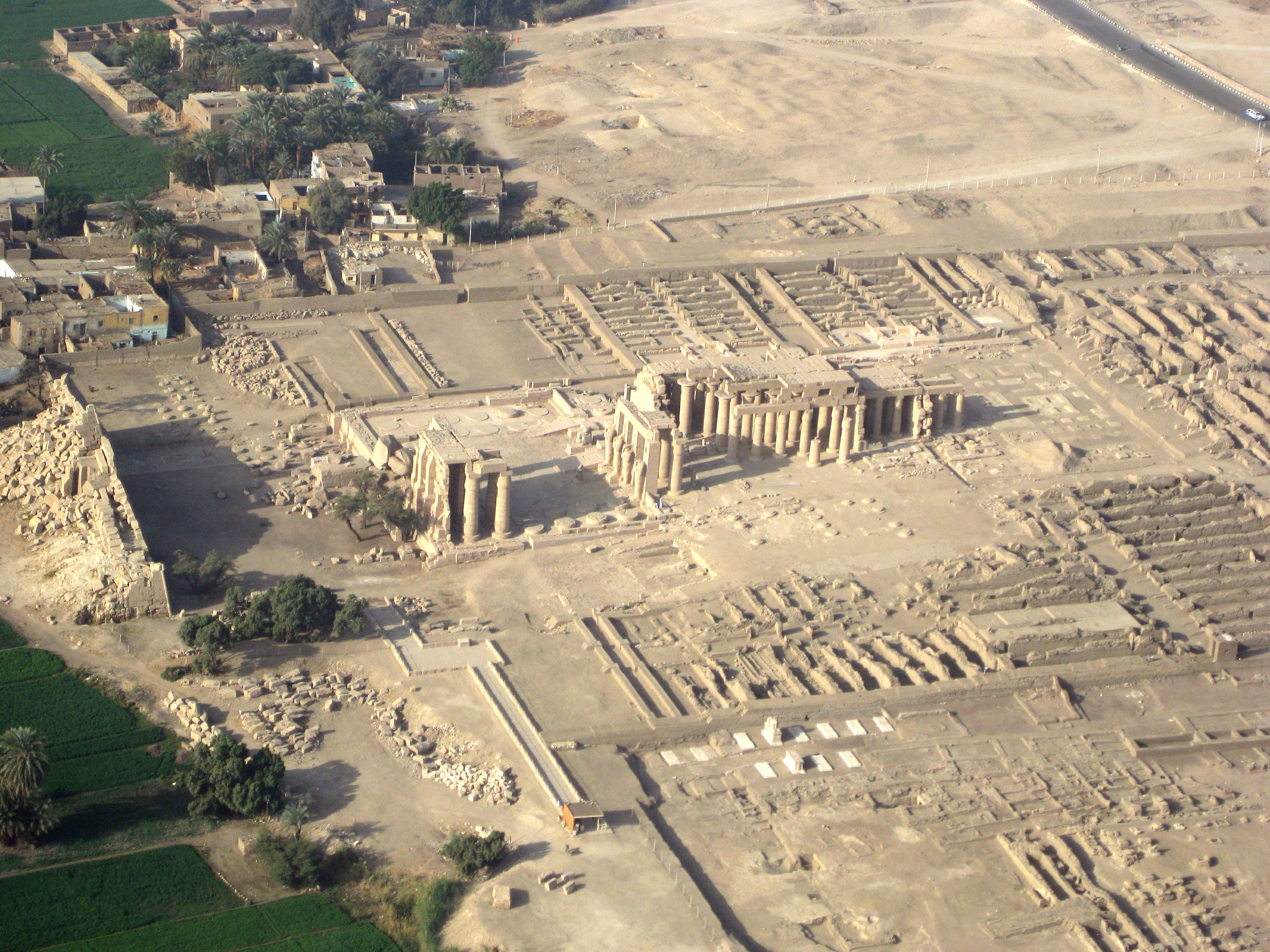
Aerial view of the Ramasseum in Thebes with its associated adobe structures

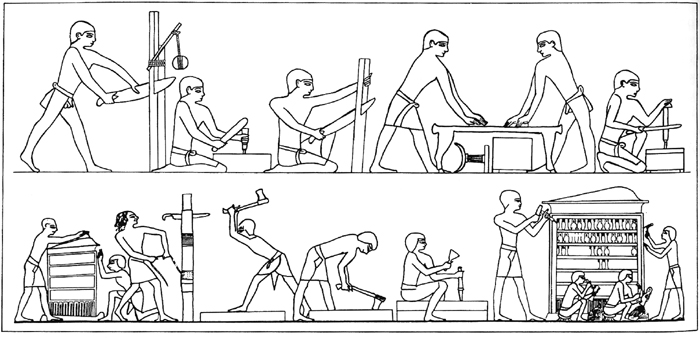
A copy of a wall painting in the tomb of Rekhmire between 1550 and 1292 BC

As opposed to the cultures of ancient Mesopotamia which built in brick, the pharaohs of Egypt built huge structures in stone. The arid climate has preserved much of the ancient buildings.

==== Materials ====
Adobe (sun-baked mud brick) construction was used for ancillary buildings and normal houses in ancient times and is still commonly used in rural Egypt. The hot, dry climate was ideal for mudbrick, which tends to wash away in the rain. The Ramesseum in Thebes, Egypt (Luxor) provides one of the finest examples of mud brick construction. Extensive storehouses with mud-brick vaults also survive, all constructed with sloping courses to avoid the need for formwork.

The grandest buildings were constructed in stone, often from massive masonry blocks. The techniques used to move massive blocks used in pyramids and temples have been subject to extensive debate. Some authors have suggested that the larger may not be cut stone but fabricated with concrete.

==== Building technology ====
Although the Egyptians achieved extraordinary feats of engineering, they appear to have done so with relatively primitive technology. As far as is known they did not use wheels or pulleys. They transported massive stones over great distances using rollers, ropes and sledges hauled by large numbers of workers. The ancient Egyptians are credited with inventing the ramp, lever, lathe, oven, ship, paper, irrigation system, window, awning, door, glass, a form of plaster of Paris, the bath, lock, shadoof, weaving, a standardized measurement system, geometry, silo, a method of drilling stone, saw, steam power, proportional scale drawings, enameling, veneer, plywood, rope truss, and more. There are no surviving Egyptian manuals so there has been considerable speculation on how stones were lifted to great heights and obelisks erected. Most theories centre on the use of ramps.

Imhotep, who lived c. 2650–2600 BC, is credited with being the first recorded architect and engineer.

==== Achievements ====
The pyramids are chiefly impressive for their enormous size and the staggering manpower that must have been employed in their construction. The largest is the Great Pyramid of Giza which remained the tallest structure in the world for 3800 years (see List of tallest freestanding structures in the world). The engineering problems involved were chiefly to do with the transport of blocks, sometimes over long distances, their movement into location and exact alignment. It is now generally agreed that the skilled building workers were respected and well-treated, but undoubtedly very large numbers of labourers were necessary to provide the brute force.

The methods used in the construction of the pyramids have been the subject of considerable research and discussion (see Egyptian pyramid construction techniques).

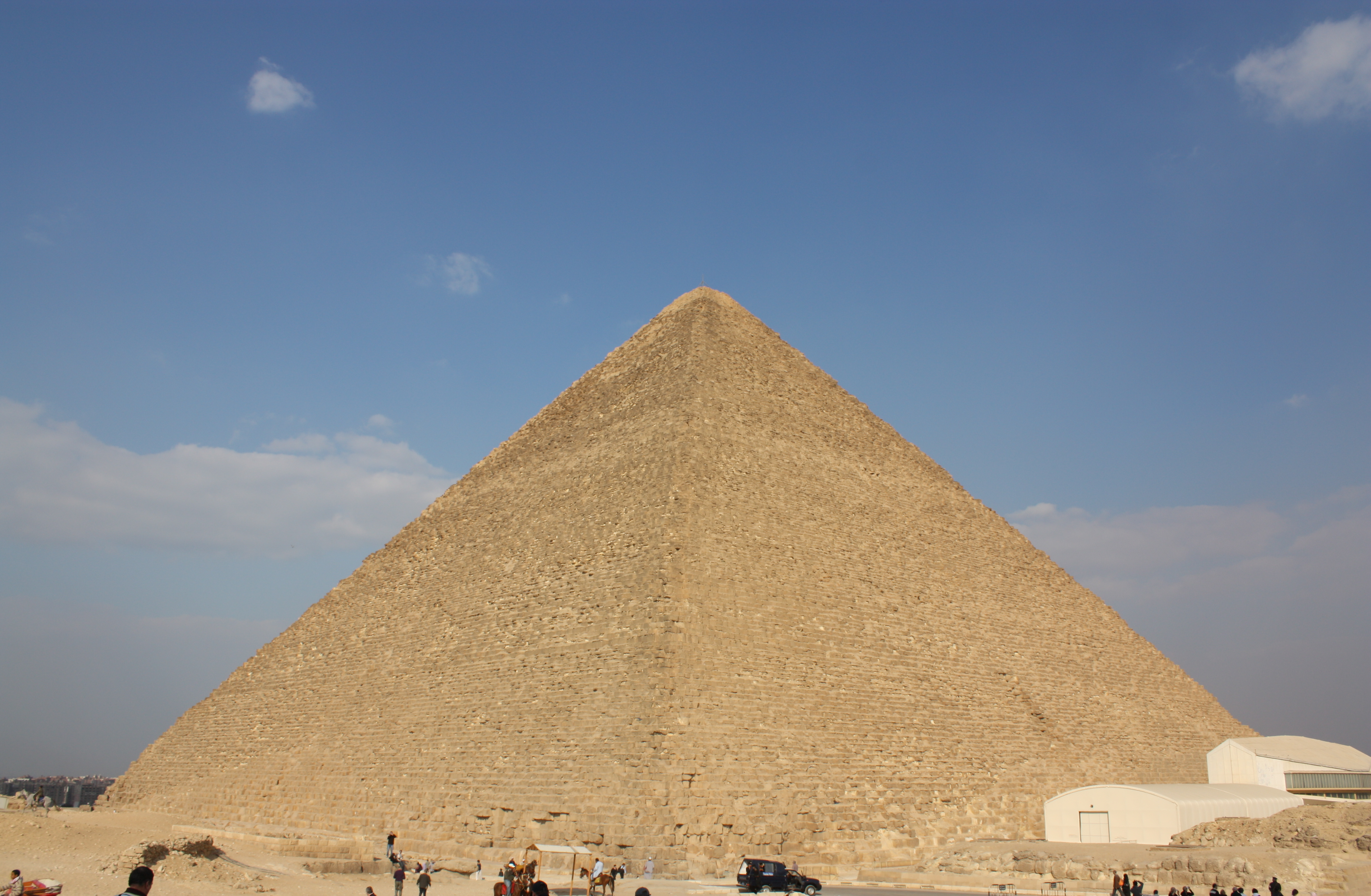
Great Pyramid of Giza, the tallest building in the world for over 3800 years

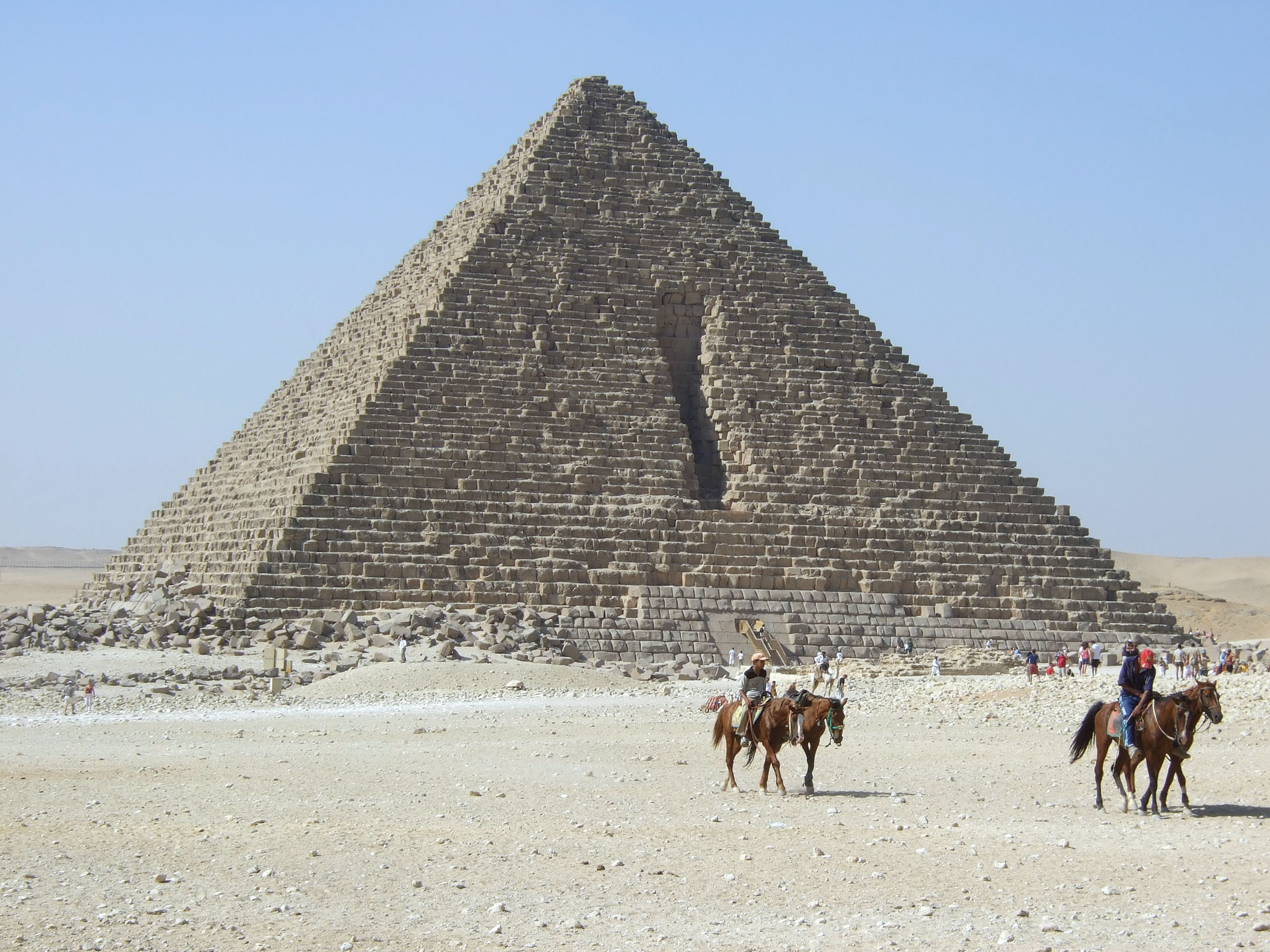
Menkaures Pyramid, Giza

=== Ancient Greece ===
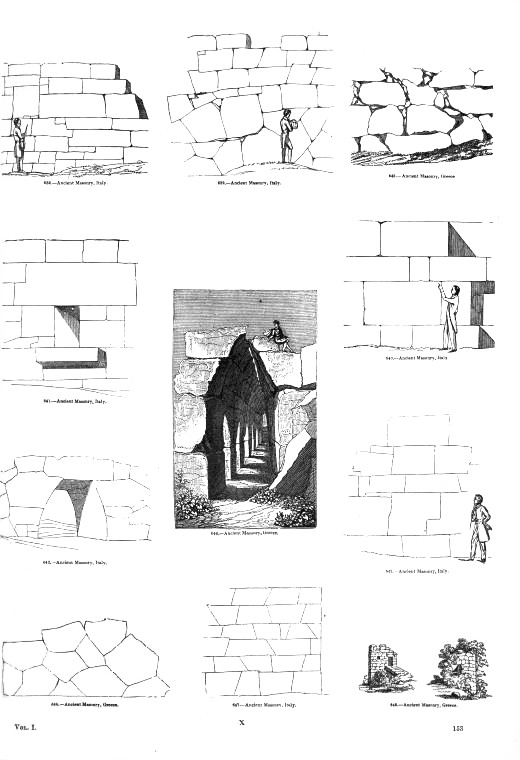
An illustration showing masonry techniques of ancient Greece and Rome

The ancient Greeks, like the Egyptians and the Mesopotamians, tended to build most of their common buildings out of mud brick, leaving no record behind them. However, many structures do survive, some of which are in a very good state of repair, although some have been partly reconstructed or re-erected in the modern era. The most dramatic are the Greek Temples. The Greeks made many advances in technology including plumbing, the spiral staircase, central heating, urban planning, the water wheel, the crane, and more.

The oldest construction drawing is in the Temple of Apollo at Didyma. An unfinished stone wall was etched with the profiles of columns and mouldings, and the wall was never finished so the drawing was not erased: a rare glimpse into the history of working construction drawings.

No timber structures survive (roofs, floors etc.), so knowledge of how these were put together is limited. The spans are, in the main, limited and suggest very simple beam and post structures spanning stone walls. For the longer spans, it is uncertain if the Greeks or Romans invented the truss but the Romans certainly used timber roof trusses. Before 650 BC the now famous ancient Greek temples were built of wood, but after this date began to be built of stone. The process of a timber structure being repeated in stone is called petrification or petrified carpentry.

Fired clay was mainly restricted to roofing tiles and associated decorations, but these were quite elaborate. The roof tiles allow a low roof pitch characteristic of ancient Greek architecture. Fired bricks began to be employed with lime mortar. Very prominent buildings were roofed in stone tiles, which mimicked the form of their terracotta counterparts. While later cultures tended to construct their stone buildings with thin skins of finished stones over rubble cores, the Greeks tended to build out of large cut blocks, joined with metal cramps. This was a slow, expensive and laborious process which limited the number of buildings that could be constructed. The metal cramps often failed through corrosion.

Building structures mostly used a simple beam and column system without vaults or arches, which based strict limits on the spans that could be achieved. However, the Greeks did construct some groin vaults, arch bridges and, with the Egyptians, the first high rise, the Lighthouse of Alexandria, one of the Seven Wonders of the Ancient World.

Greek mathematics was technically advanced and it is certain that they employed and understood the principles of pulleys, which would have enabled them to build jibs and cranes to lift heavy stonework to the upper parts of buildings. Their surveying skills were exceptional, enabling them to set out the incredibly exact optical corrections of buildings like the Parthenon, although the methods used remain a mystery. Simpler decoration, such as fluting on columns, was usually left until after the drums of the columns were put in place.

The ancient Greeks never developed the strong mortars which became an important feature of Roman construction.

=== Roman Empire ===
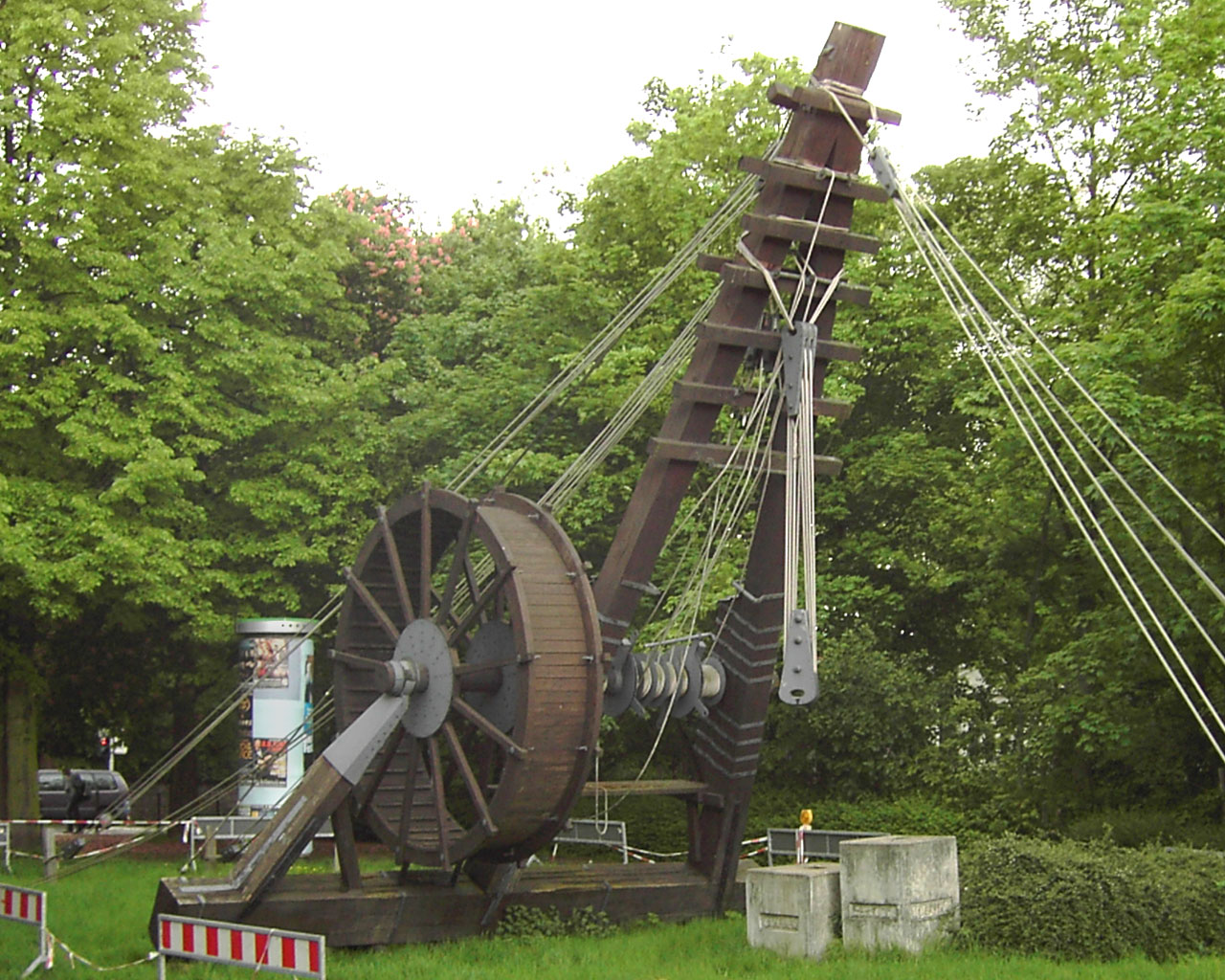
Reconstructed Roman treadwheel crane at Bonn, Germany

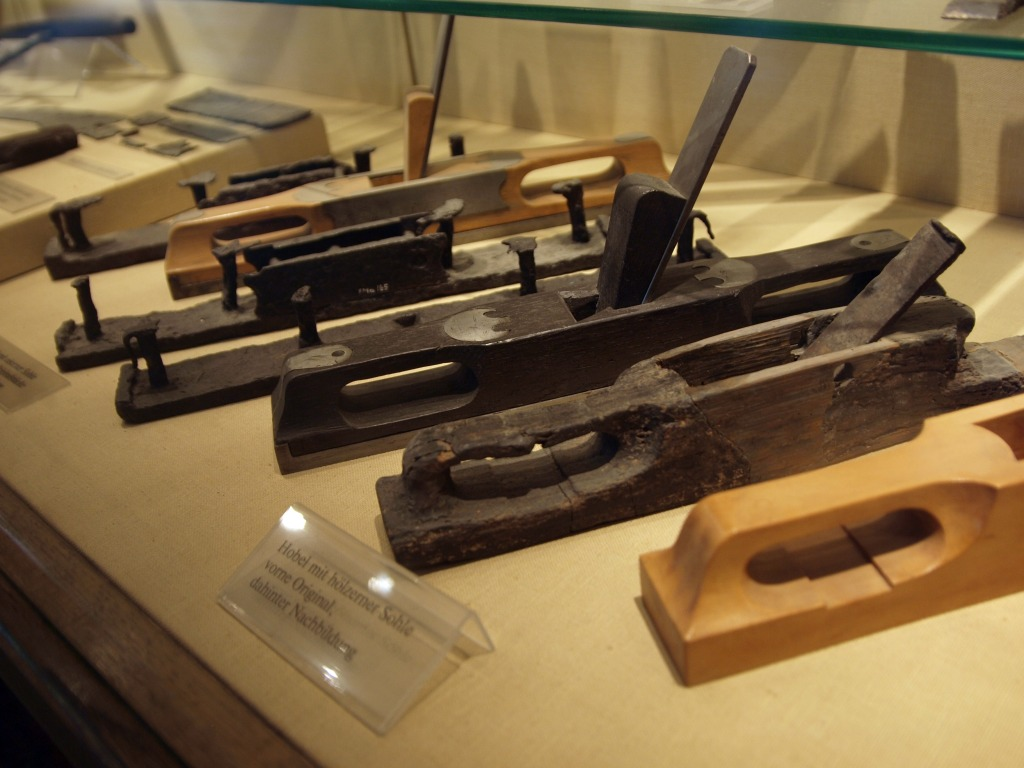
The hand plane developed in the Iron Age and was known to be used by the Romans. These Roman planes were found in Germany and date to the 1st to 3rd century AD.

In striking contrast to previous cultures, an enormous amount is known about Roman building construction. A very large amount survives, including complete intact buildings like the Pantheon, Rome and very well-preserved ruins at Pompeii and Herculaneum. The first surviving treatise on architecture is by Marcus Vitruvius Pollio, which includes extensive passages on construction techniques. His writings reinforced the difference between a master builder and an architect.

==== Materials ====
The great Roman development in building materials was the use of hydraulic lime mortar called Roman concrete. Previous cultures had used lime mortars but by adding volcanic ash called a pozzolana the mortar would harden under water thus creating a self-healing cement. This provided them with a strong material for bulk walling. They used brick or stone to build the outer skins of the wall and then filled the cavity with massive amounts of concrete, effectively using the brickwork as permanent shuttering (formwork). Later they used wooden shuttering that was removed for the concrete to cure.

An example of a temple made of Roman concrete in the 1st century BC is the Temple of Vesta in Tivoli, Italy. The concrete was made of nothing more than rubble and mortar. It was cheap and very easy to produce and required relatively unskilled labour to use, enabling the Romans to build on an unprecedented scale. They not only used it for walls but also to form arches, barrel vaults and domes, which they built over huge spans. The Romans developed systems of hollow pots for making their domes and sophisticated heating and ventilation systems for their thermal baths.

The Romans substituted bronze for wood in the roof truss(s) of the Pantheon's portico which was commissioned between 27 BC and 14 AD. The bronze trusses were unique but in 1625 Pope Urban VIII had the trusses replaced with wood and melted the bronze down for other uses. The Romans also made bronze roof tiles.

Lead was used for roof covering material and water supply and waste pipes. The Latin name for lead is plumbum, thus plumbing. Romans also made use of glass in construction with colored glass in mosaics and clear glass for windows. Glass came to be fairly commonly used in windows of public buildings. Central heating in the form of a hypocaust, a raised floor heated by the exhaust of a wood or coal fire.

==== Organisation of labour ====
The Romans had trade guilds. Most construction was done by slaves or free men. The use of slave labour undoubtedly cut costs and was one of the reasons for the scale of some of the structures. The Romans placed a considerable emphasis in building their buildings extremely fast, usually within two years. For very large structures the only way this could be achieved was by the application of vast numbers of workers to the task.

==== Technology ====
The inventions of the waterwheel, sawmill, and arch were by the Romans. The Romans also began using glass for architectural purposes after about 100 CE and used double glazing as insulated glazing. Roman roads included corduroy roads and paved roads, sometimes supported on raft or pile foundations and bridges. Vitruvius gives details of many Roman machines. The Romans developed sophisticated timber cranes allowing them to lift considerable weights to great heights. The upper limit of lifting appears to have been about 100 tonnes. Trajan's column in Rome contains some of the largest stones ever lifted in a Roman building, and engineers are still uncertain exactly how it was achieved.

A list of the longest, highest and deepest Roman structures can be found in the List of ancient architectural records. Roman building ingenuity extended over bridges, aqueducts, and covered amphitheatres. Their sewerage and water-supply works were remarkable and some systems are still in operation. The only aspect of Roman construction for which very little evidence survives is the form of timber roof structures, none of which seem to have survived intact. Possibly, triangulated roof trusses were built, this being the only conceivable way of constructing the immense spans achieved, the longest exceeding 30 metres (see List of ancient Greek and Roman roofs).

=== Ancient China ===
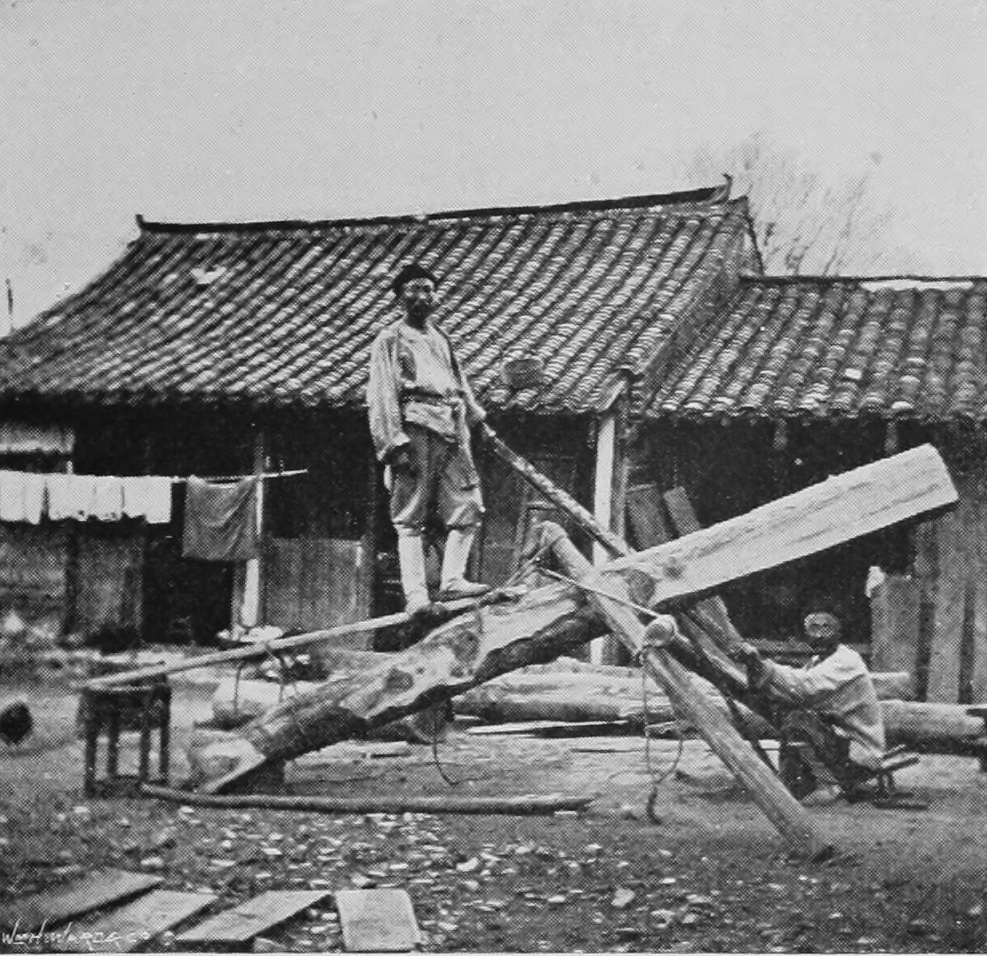
The Far East used a different method of sawing logs than the West's method of pit-sawing with a saw pit: The concept is the same but as shown here the log is angled and no pit is used.

China is a cultural hearth area of eastern Asia. Many Far East building methods and styles evolved from China. A famous example of Chinese construction is the Great Wall of China, built between the 7th and 2nd centuries BC. The Great Wall was built with rammed earth, stones, and wood and later bricks and tiles with lime mortar. Wooden gates blocked passageways. The oldest archaeological examples of mortise and tenon type woodworking joints were found in China dating to about 5000 BC.

The Yingzao Fashi is the oldest complete technical manual on Chinese architecture. The Chinese followed the state rules for thousands of years so many of the ancient, surviving buildings were built with the methods and materials still used in the 11th century. Chinese temples are typically wooden timber frames on an earth and stone base. The oldest wooden building is the Nanchan Temple (Wutai) dating from 782 AD. However, Chinese temple builders regularly rebuild the wooden temples so some parts of these ancient buildings are of different ages. Traditional Chinese timber frames do not use trusses but rely only on post and lintel construction. An important architectural element are the dougong bracket sets. The Songyue Pagoda is the oldest brick pagoda dating to 523 AD. It was built with yellow fired bricks laid in clay mortar, with twelve sides and fifteen levels of roofs. The Anji Bridge is the world's oldest open-spandrel stone segmental arch bridge built in 595–605 AD. The bridge is built with sandstone joined with dovetail, iron joints.

Most of the (restored) Great Wall sections seen today were built with bricks, and cut stone blocks/slabs. Where bricks and blocks were unavailable, tamped earth, uncut stones, wood, and even reeds were used as local materials. Wood was used for forts and as an auxiliary material. Where local timber was not enough, it was delivered in.

==== Stone Great Wall sections ====
In mountain areas, workers quarried stone to build the Great Wall. Using the mountains themselves as footings, the outer layer of the Great Wall was built with stone blocks (and bricks), and filled with uncut stone and anything else available (like earth and dead workers).

==== Soil Great Wall sections ====
On the plains, Great Wall workers made use of local soil (sand, loess, etc.) and rammed it into compact layers.

==== Sand (and reed/willow) Great Wall sections ====
Sand does not stick together, so it was used as a fill material between reed and willow layers to build sections of the wall.

The region of West China around Dunhuang is desert. Innovative builders there made use of reeds and willow brought in from rivers and oases to build a strong wall. Jade Gate Pass (Yumenguan) Great Wall Fort was built with 20-cm layers of sand and reed, an impressive 9 meters high.

==== Brick Great Wall sections ====
The Ming Dynasty Great Wall was mostly built with bricks. To build a strong wall with bricks, they used lime mortar. Workers built brick and cement factories with local materials near the wall.

== Middle Ages ==
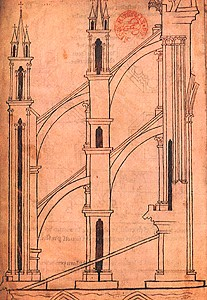
Villard de Honnecourt's drawing of a flying buttress at Reims, c. AD 1320–1335 (Bibliothèque nationale)

The Middle Ages of Europe span from the 5th to 15th centuries AD, from the fall of the Western Roman Empire to the Renaissance, and is divided into Pre-Romanesque and Romanesque periods. The downfall of the Roman Empire led to a decline in building activities and technology. Construction efforts were mostly done by the Roman Catholic Church. Craft training and education became a major focus in this period and craft guilds were organized. Three distinct levels of ability (master, journeyman, and apprentice) were recognized.

Fortifications, castles and cathedrals were the greatest construction projects. The Middle Ages began with the end of the Roman era and many Roman building techniques were lost. But some Roman techniques, including the use of iron ring-beams, appear to have been used in the Palatine Chapel at Aachen, c. 800 AD, where it is believed builders from the Lombard Kingdom in northern Italy contributed to the work. A revival of stone buildings in the 9th century and the Romanesque style of architecture began in the late 11th century. Also notable are the stave churches in Scandinavia.

=== Materials ===
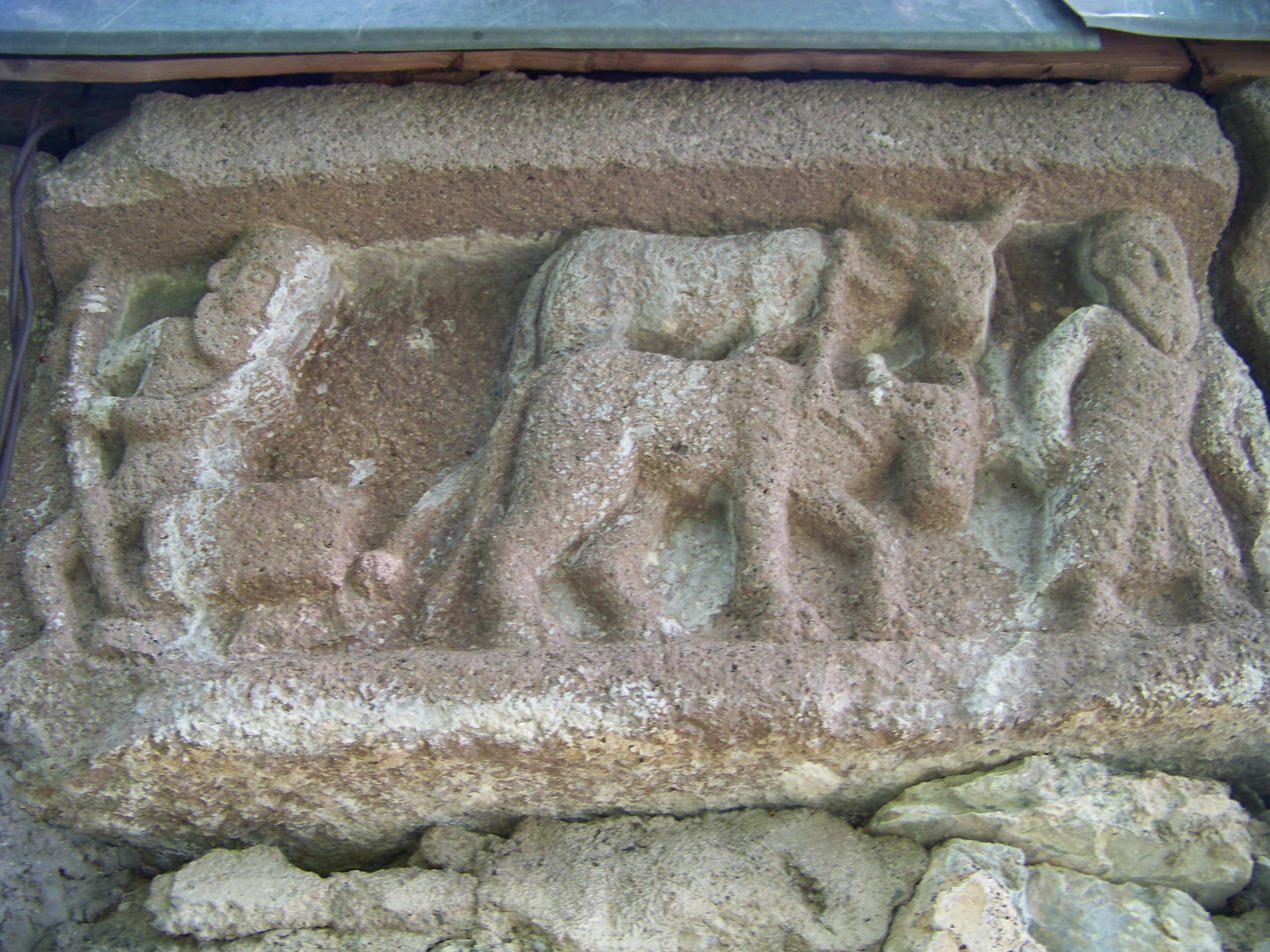
Workers transport a large stone on an ox-drawn sledge for the construction of a church. A sculpture from the 10th-century Korogho church in Georgia.

Most buildings in Northern Europe were constructed of timber until c. 1000 AD. In Southern Europe adobe remained predominant. Brick continued to be manufactured in Italy throughout the period 600–1000 AD but elsewhere the craft of brickmaking had largely disappeared and with it the methods for burning tiles. Roofs were largely thatched. Houses were small and gathered around a large communal hall. Monasticism spread more sophisticated building techniques. The Cistercians may have been responsible for reintroducing brickmaking to the area from the Netherlands, through Denmark and Northern Germany to Poland leading to Backsteingotik. Brick remained the most popular prestige material in these areas throughout the period. Elsewhere buildings were typically in timber or where it could be afforded, stone. Medieval stone walls were constructed using cut blocks on the outside of the walls and rubble infill, with weak lime mortars. The poor hardening properties of these mortars were a continual problem, and the settlement of the rubble filling of Romanesque and Gothic walls and piers is still a major cause for concern.

=== Design ===
There were no standard textbooks on building in the Middle Ages. Master craftsmen transferred their knowledge through apprenticeships and from father to son. Trade secrets were closely guarded, as they were the source of a craftsman's livelihood. Drawings only survive from the later period. Parchment was too expensive to be commonly used and paper did not appear until the end of the period. Models were used for designing structures and could be built to large scales. Details were mostly designed at full size on tracing floors, some of which survive.

=== Techniques ===
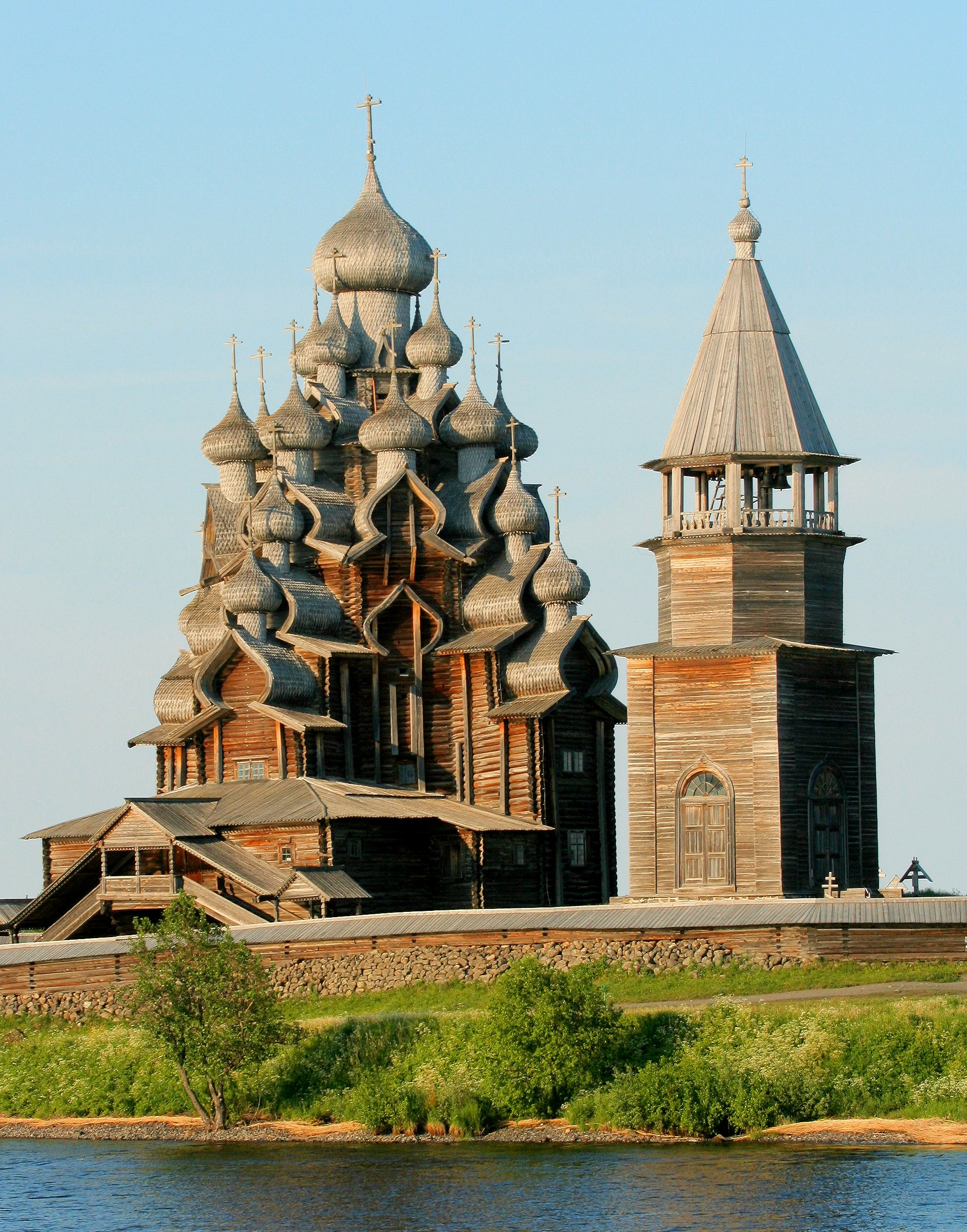
Church in Kizhi, Russia, is listed as a UNESCO World Heritage Site as a building constructed entirely out of wood, in the log building technique.

Romanesque buildings of the period 600–1100 AD were entirely roofed in timber or had stone barrel vaults covered by timber roofs. The Gothic style of architecture with its vaults, flying buttresses and pointed gothic arches developed in the twelfth century, and in the centuries that followed ever more incredible feats of constructional daring were achieved in stone. Thin stone vaults and towering buildings were constructed using rules derived by trial and error. Failures were frequent, particularly in difficult areas such as crossing towers.

The pile driver was invented around 1500.

=== Achievements ===
The scale of fortifications and castle building in the Middle Ages was remarkable, but the outstanding buildings of the period were the Gothic cathedrals with thin masonry vaults and walls of glass. Outstanding examples are: Beauvais Cathedral, Chartres Cathedral, King's College Chapel and Notre Dame, Paris.

== Renaissance ==
The Renaissance in Italy, the invention of moveable type and the Reformation changed the character of construction. The rediscovery of Vitruvius had a strong influence. During the Middle Ages buildings were designed by the people that built them. The master mason and master carpenters learnt their trades by word of mouth and relied on experience, models and rules of thumb to determine the sizes of building elements. Vitruvius, however, describes in detail the education of the perfect architect who, he said, must be skilled in all the arts and sciences. Filippo Brunelleschi was one of the first of the new style of architects. He started life as a goldsmith and educated himself in Roman architecture by studying ruins. He went on to engineer the dome of Santa Maria del Fiore in Florence.

=== Materials ===
The major breakthroughs in this period were to do with the technology of conversion. Water mills in most of western Europe were used to saw timber and convert trees into planks. Bricks were used in ever increasing quantities. In Italy the brickmakers were organised into guilds although the kilns were mostly in rural areas because of the risk of fire and easy availability of firewood and brickearth. Brickmakers were typically paid by the brick, which gave them an incentive to make them too small. As a result, legislation was laid down regulating the minimum sizes and each town kept measures against which bricks had to be compared. An increasing amount of ironwork was used in roof carpentry for straps and tension members. The iron was fixed using forelock bolts. The screw-threaded bolt (and nut) could be made and are found in clockmaking in this period, but they were labour-intensive and thus not used on large structures. Roofing was typically of terracotta roof tiles. In Italy they followed Roman precedents. In northern Europe plain tiles were used. Stone, where available, remained the material of choice for prestige buildings.

=== Design ===
The rebirth of the idea of an architect in the Renaissance radically changed the nature of building design. The Renaissance reintroduced the classical style of architecture. Leon Battista Alberti's treatise on architecture raised the subject to a new level, defining architecture as something worthy of study by the aristocracy. Previously it was viewed merely as a technical art, suited only to the artisan. The resulting change in status of architecture and more importantly the architect is key to understanding the changes in the process of design. The Renaissance architect was often an artist (a painter or sculptor) who had little knowledge of building technology but a keen grasp of the rules of classical design. The architect thus had to provide detailed drawings for the craftsmen setting out the disposition of the various parts. This was what is called the process of design, from the Italian word for drawing. Occasionally the architect would get involved in particularly difficult technical problems but the technical side of architecture was mainly left up to the craftsmen. This change in the way buildings were designed had a fundamental difference on the way problems were approached. Where the Medieval craftsmen tended to approach a problem with a technical solution in mind, the Renaissance architects started with an idea of what the end product needed to look like and then searched around for a way of making it work. This led to extraordinary leaps forward in engineering.

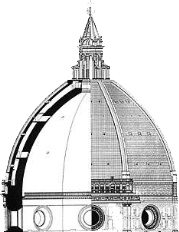
The structure of the dome of Florence cathedral, showing the double skin structure

Pieter Bruegel the Elder's Tower of Babel, illustrating construction techniques of the 16th century

=== Techniques ===
The wish to return to classical architecture created problems for the Renaissance buildings. The builders did not use concrete and thus comparable vaults and domes had to be replicated in brick or stone. The greatest technical feats were undoubtedly in these areas. The first major breakthrough was Brunelleschi's project for the dome of Florence Cathedral. Brunelleschi managed to devise a way of building a huge dome without formwork, relying instead on the weight of the bricks and the way they were laid to keep them in position and the shape of the dome to keep it standing. The exact way the dome was built is still subject to debate today as it is not possible to take the dome apart to study its construction without destroying it. The dome is a double skin, linked by ribs, with a series of wooden and stone chains around it at intervals to attempt to deal with hoop stresses.

Brunelleschi's dome was completed (up to the base of the lantern) in 1446. Its size was soon surpassed by the dome of St Peter's, built using flying scaffolding supported on the cornices and constructed using two stone shells.

== Early Modern ==
=== 17th century ===
The birth of the modern science in the 17th century greatly affected building construction. Towards the end of the century, architect-engineers began to use experimental science to analyse the forms of their buildings. Seventeenth-century structures relied strongly on experience, rules of thumb and the use of scale models. It was not until the eighteenth century that engineering theory developed sufficiently to allow sizes of members to be calculated.

Major improvements to the manufacturing process of glass was happening during the 17th century. The first cast plate glass were developed in France and iron was increasingly employed in structures. For example, Christopher Wren used iron hangers to suspend floor beams at Hampton Court Palace, and iron rods to repair Salisbury Cathedral and strengthen the dome of St Paul's Cathedral. Most buildings had stone ashlar surfaces covering rubble cores, held together with lime mortar. Experiments were made mixing lime with other materials to provide a hydraulic mortar, but there was still no equivalent of the Roman concrete. In England, France and the Dutch Republic, cut and gauged brickwork was used to provide detailed and ornate facades. The triangulated roof truss was introduced to England and used by Inigo Jones and Christopher Wren.

Many tools have been made obsolete by modern technology, but the line gauge, plumb-line, the carpenter's square, the spirit level, and the drafting compass are still in regular use.

Despite the birth of experimental science, the methods of construction in this period remained largely medieval. The same types of crane that had been used in previous centuries were still being employed. Flying scaffolds were employed at St Paul's Cathedral, England and in the dome of St Peters, Rome, but otherwise the same types of timber scaffolding that had been in use centuries before were retained. Cranes and scaffolding depended on timber. Complex systems of pulleys allowed comparatively large loads to be lifted, and long ramps were used to haul loads up to the upper parts of buildings.

=== 18th century ===
The 18th century saw the development of many the ideas that had been born in the late 17th century. The architects and engineers became increasingly professionalised. Experimental science and mathematical methods became increasingly sophisticated and employed in buildings. At the same time the birth of the industrial revolution saw an increase in the size of cities and increase in the pace and quantity of construction.

The use of cast and wrought iron brought breakthroughs in this period. Iron columns had been used in Wren's designs for the House of Commons and were used in several early 18th-century churches in London, but these supported only galleries. In the second half of the 18th century the decreasing costs of iron production allowed the construction of major pieces of iron engineering. The Iron Bridge at Coalbrookdale (1779) is a particularly notable example. Large-scale mill construction required fire-proof buildings and cast iron became increasingly used for columns and beams to carry brick vaults for floors. The Louvre in Paris boasted an early example of a wrought-iron roof. Steel was used in the manufacture of tools but could not be made in sufficient quantities to be used for building.

Brick production increased markedly during this period. Many buildings throughout Europe were built of brick, but they were often coated in lime render, sometimes patterned to look like stone. Brick production itself changed little. Bricks were moulded by hand and fired in kilns no different to those used for centuries before. Terracotta in the form of Coade stone was used as an artificial stone in the UK.

== Industrial Revolution ==
=== 1st Industrial Revolution (19th century) ===
Construction became recognized as separate from design. Theoretical concepts on physics, mathematics, chemistry and thermodynamics were being developed and applied to create building science as a discipline. The various building professions (architecture, engineering, and construction) were becoming defined.

The Industrial Revolution was manifested in new kinds of transportation installations, such as railways, canals and macadam roads. These required large amounts of investment. New construction devices included steam engines, machine tools, explosives and optical surveying. The steam engine combined with two other technologies which blossomed in the nineteenth century, the circular saw and machine cut nails, lead to the use of balloon framing and the decline of traditional timber framing.

As steel was mass-produced from the mid-19th century, it was used in the form of I-beams and reinforced concrete. Glass panes also went into mass production, and went from a luxury to a commonplace item. Plumbing appeared, and gave common access to drinking water and sewage collection.

Building codes have been applied since the 19th century, with special respect to fire safety.

=== 2nd Industrial Revolution (20th century) ===
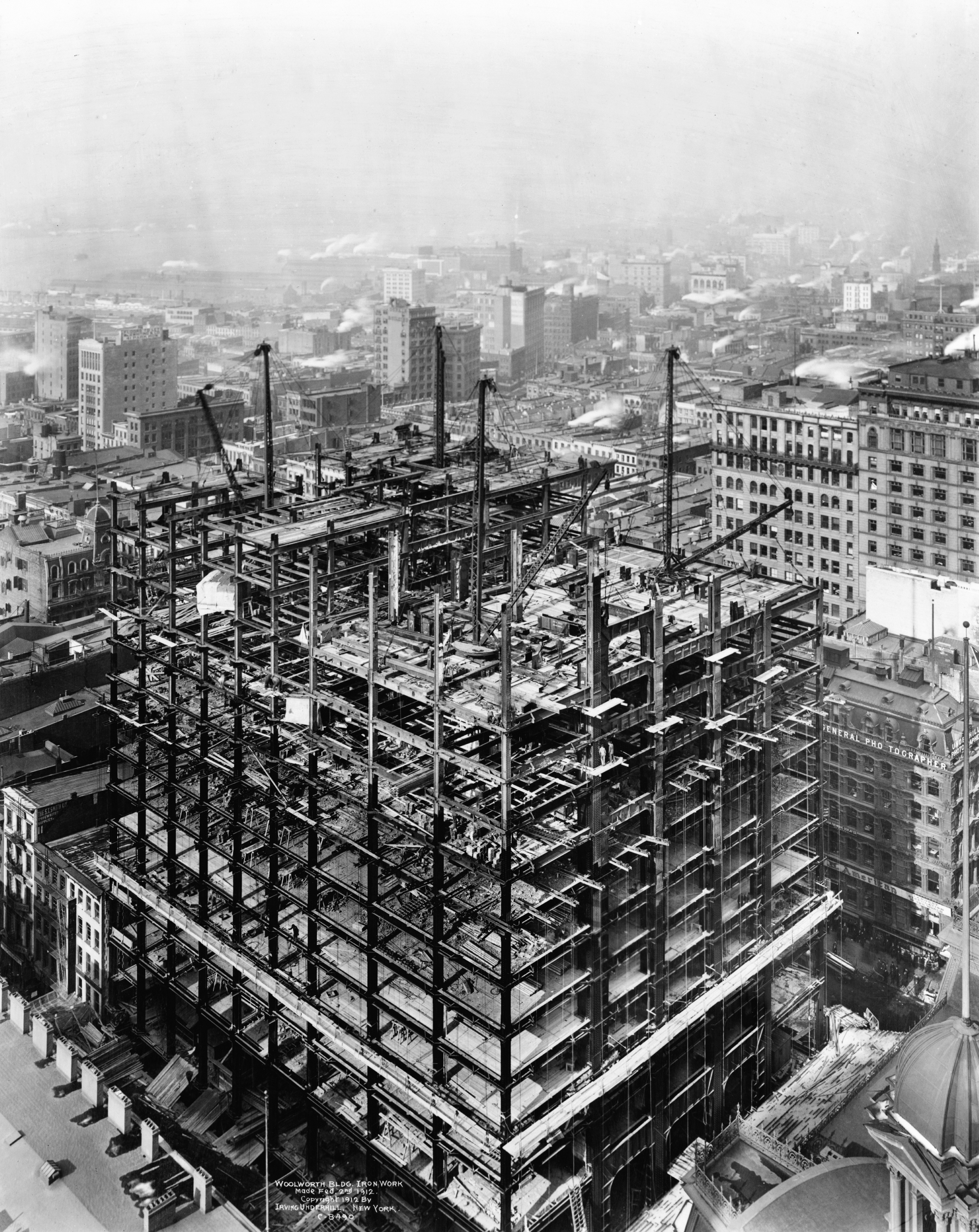
Woolworth Building under construction in 1912

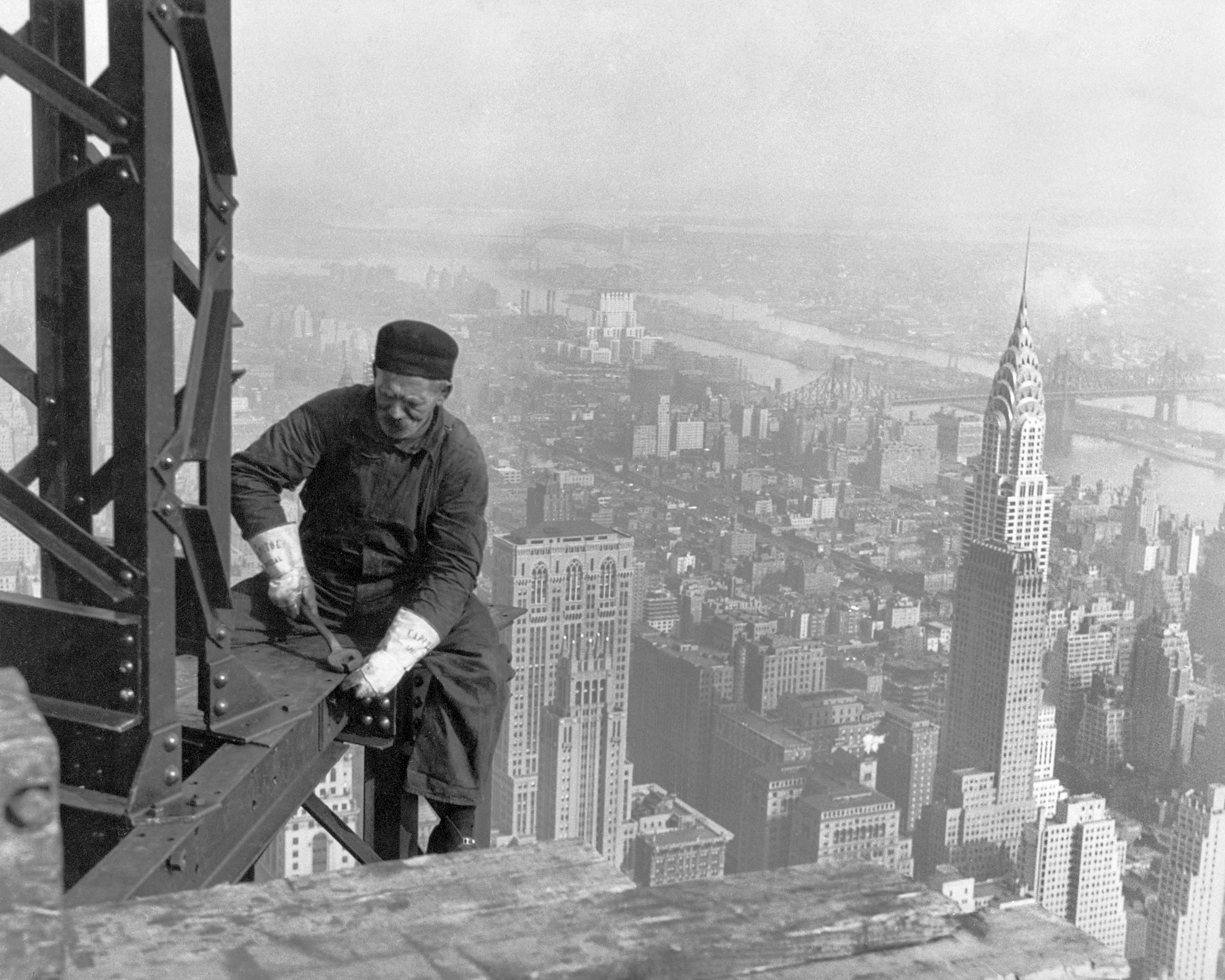
A structural worker on the Empire State Building. Workers such as this man were often referred to as "old timers" because in that time era, most men working on building structures were middle-aged.

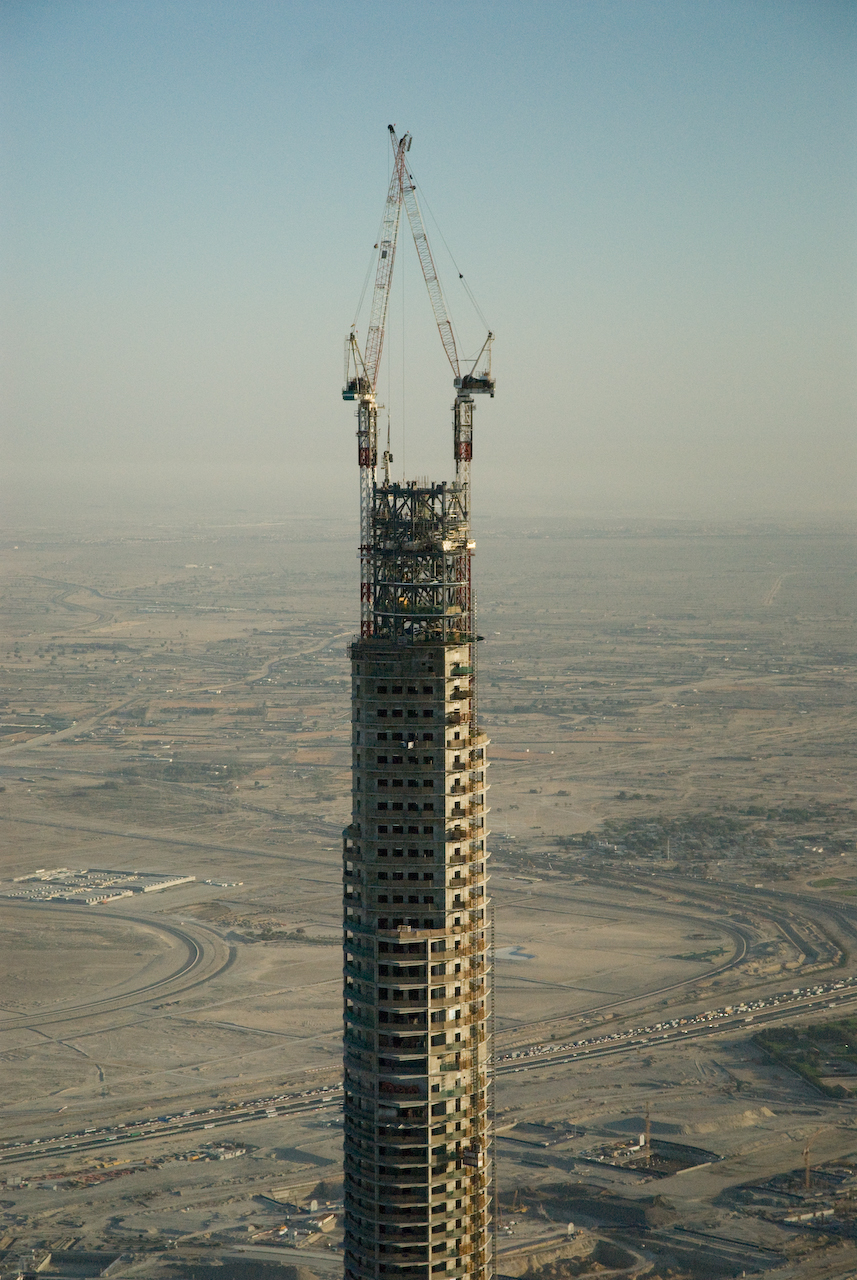
Burj Khalifa, the world's tallest building, was finished in 2010.

With the Second Industrial Revolution in the early 20th century, elevators and cranes made high rise buildings and skyscrapers possible, while heavy equipment and power tools decreased the workforce needed. Skyscrapers dominated the construction field and new technologies like prefabrication and computer-aided design emerged.

Trade unions were formed to protect construction workers' interests and occupational safety and health. Personal protective equipment such as hard hats and earmuffs also came into use, and have become mandatory at most sites.

Governmental construction projects were used as a part of macroeconomic stimulation policies, especially during the Great Depression (see New Deal). For economy of scale, whole suburbs, towns and cities, including infrastructure, are often planned and constructed within the same project (called megaproject if the cost exceeds US$1 billion), such as Brasília in Brazil, and the Million Programme in Sweden.

=== 3rd Industrial Revolution (21st century) ===
By the end of the 20th century, ecology, energy conservation and sustainable development had become important issues of construction. Construction methods prioritize sustainability and the Leadership in Energy and Environmental Design (LEED) certification was created.

Innovators utilized the concepts of lean manufacturing developed in the early industrial revolution to develop lean construction concepts. Advances in technology such as 3D Printing, drones and robotics, GPS, building information modelling and pre-fabrication increased the efficiency of construction. The United States was the first adopter of 3D printing technology in construction where huge machines would "print-out" cement in layers to form the walls of buildings. The development of robots and drones allowed constructors to view hard to reach areas. Modern residential homes would be built at fabrication homes and assembled on-site. Computer software could produce 3D versions of the building allowing construction managers to analyze the constructability of buildings before construction starts reducing the costs brought by change orders.

The Digital age also led to various construction methods such as fast-track construction. Fast-track construction has been increasingly popular in the 21st century. Some estimates suggest that 40% of construction projects are now fast-track construction.

== Academic discipline ==
There is no established academic discipline of construction history but a growing number of researchers and academics are working in this field, including structural engineers, archaeologists, architects, historians of technology and architectural historians. Although the subject has been studied since the Renaissance and there were a number of important studies in the nineteenth century, it largely went out of fashion in the mid-twentieth century. In the last thirty years there has been an enormous increase in interest in this field, which is vital to the growing practice of building conservation.

=== Early writers ===
The earliest surviving book detailing historical building techniques is the treatise of the Roman author, Vitruvius, but his approach was neither scholarly nor systematic. Much later, in the Renaissance, Vasari mentions Filippo Brunelleschi's interest in researching Roman building techniques, although if he wrote anything on the subject it does not survive. In the seventeenth century, Rusconi's illustrations for his version of Leon Battista Alberti's treatise explicitly show Roman wall construction, but most of the interest in antiquity was in understanding its proportions and detail and the architects of the time were content to build using current techniques. While early archaeological studies and topographic works such as the engravings of Giovanni Battista Piranesi show Roman construction they were not explicitly analytical and much of what they do show is made up.

=== 19th century studies ===
In the nineteenth century, lecturers increasingly illustrated their lectures with images of building techniques used in the past and these types of images increasingly appeared in construction textbooks, such as Rondelet's. The greatest advances, however, were made by English and French (and later German) architects attempting to understand, record and analyse Gothic buildings. Typical of this type of writing are the works of Robert Willis in England, Viollet-le-Duc in France and Ungewitter in Germany. None of these however were seeking to suggest that the history of construction represented a new approach to the subject of architectural history. Auguste Choisy was perhaps the first author to seriously attempt to undertake such a study.

=== Early 20th century studies ===
Santiago Huerta Fernández has suggested that it was modernism, with its emphasis on the employment of new materials, that abruptly ended the interest in construction history that appeared to have been growing in the last few decades of the nineteenth century and the early years of the twentieth. With the advent of concrete and steel frame construction, architects, who had been the chief audience for such studies, were no longer as interested as they had been in understanding traditional construction, which suddenly appeared redundant. Very little was thus published between 1920 and 1950. The revival of interest started in archaeology with the studies of Roman construction in the 1950s, but it was not until the 1980s that construction history began to emerge as an independent field.

=== Late 20th century ===
By the end of the twentieth century, steel and concrete construction were themselves becoming the subject of historical investigation. The Construction History Society was formed in the UK in 1982. It produces the only academic international journal devoted to the subject, Construction History, twice annually. The International Congress on Construction History is held every three years, with the First International Congress on Construction History held in Madrid in 2003. This has been followed by editions held in Queens College, Cambridge, England (2006), Cottbus (2009), Paris (2012), Chicago (2015), Brussels (2018), and Lisbon (2021).

== See also ==
- History of architecture
- History of structural engineering
- History of water supply and sanitation
- Construction History Society
- Timeline of architecture
