= Festival international du livre d'art et du film =

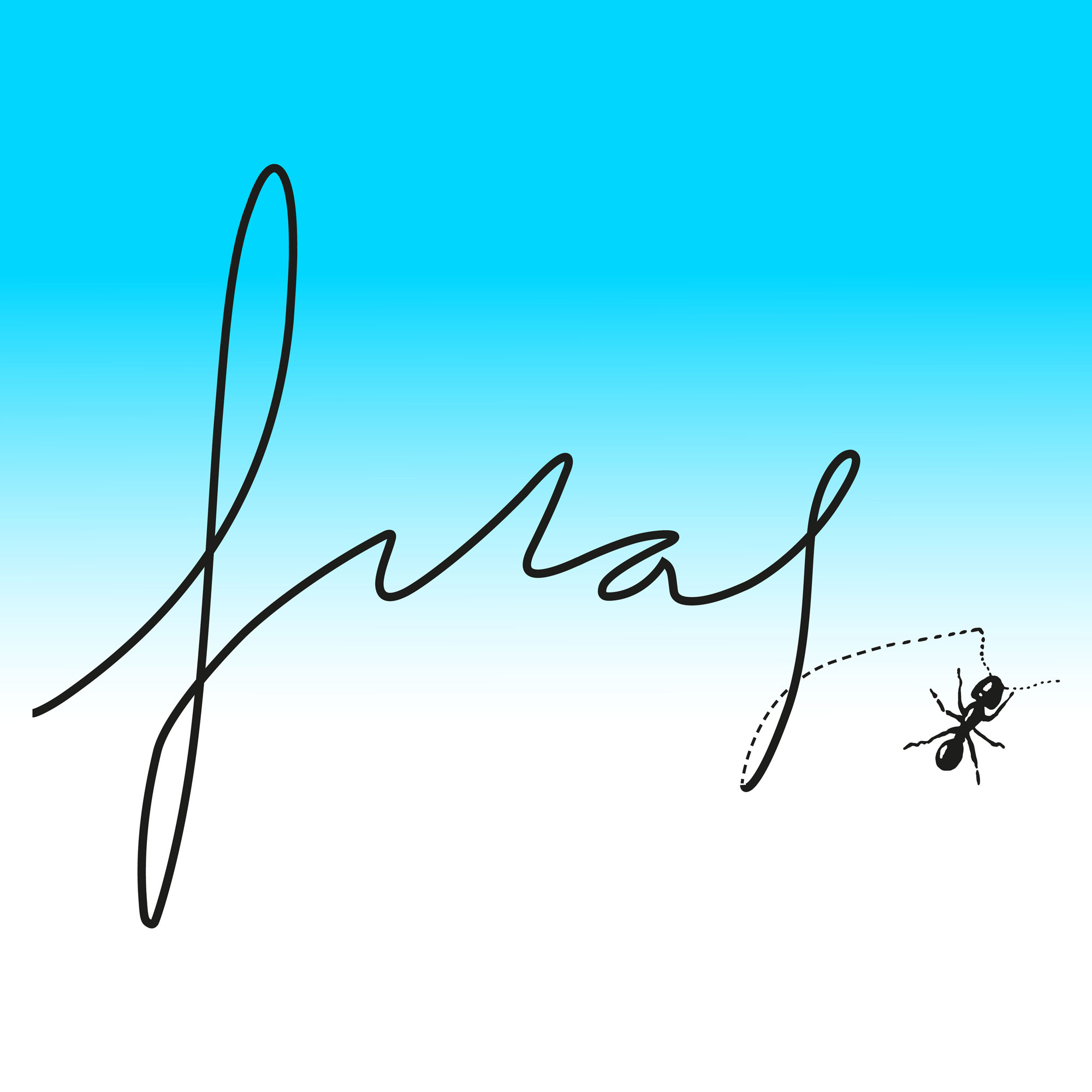
- Abbreviation: FILAF
- Formation: 2010
- Type: International of Art Books and Films Festival
- Purpose: Promote and reward the best books and films about art published every year worldwide
- Region served: Occitanie (South of France)
- Fields: Perpignan (France)
- Official language: French/English
- President: Sébastien Planas
- Director: Rachel Simon
- Website: filaf.com

The International Art Books and Films Festival (in French, Festival International du Livre d'Art et du Film) or FILAF, is an international festival about art books and films which takes place annually in Perpignan (South of France) since 2011. Its goal is to promote and award the best books and films about art produced each year in the world.

== History and goals ==
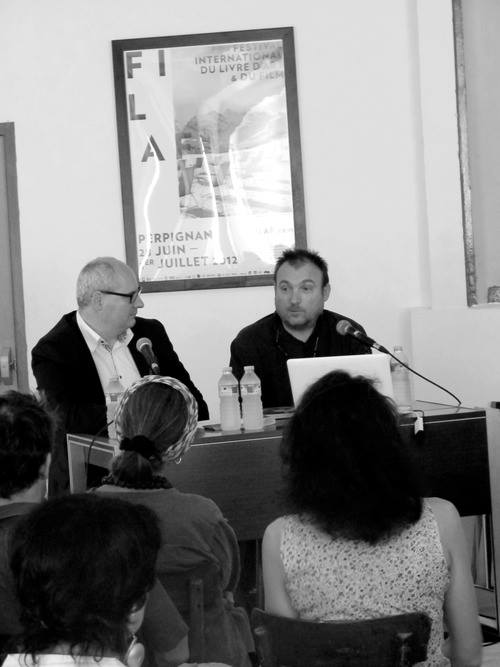
Philippe Régnier and Miquel Barceló – FILAF 2012

Noting the world absence of a real event only focused on art books, and similarly on the field of art films, the Cogito Organization and its president Sébastien Planas created the International Artbooks and Films Festival in Perpignan. The first edition took place in June 2011

The aim of the festival is to present to the general public a selection of the best books and films on art published or produced during the past year on an international scale. Authors, editors, directors, producers and selected artists are invited to Perpignan to present their work. A week of conferences, screenings, readings, signatures, workshops for children, professional round tables, thematic evenings, allows the world of art to meet and present its most important productions.

The FILAF festival relies on a scientific professional committee, recognized in each of their disciplines, responsible for selection throughout the year. It also mobilizes an annually renewed jury which, at the end of the festival, awards the Gold FILAF, the Silver FILAF and the Special Jury Prize (categories "book" and « film »).

In 2016, the FILAF festival created a new prize in collaboration with French Art Fair Galeristes, to reward the best art book published by an art gallery.

== Scientific committee ==
From 2011 to 2016

- Xavier Canonne (Director, Museum of Photography in Charleroi)
- Hélène Joubert (Curator, Musée du Quai Branly, Paris)
- Philippe Régnier (Editor-in-Chief, Daily Art)
- Guillaume Faroult (Louvre Museum)
- Pierre Jaubert (RMN Library, Louvre Museum)
- Florence Viguier (Director, Ingres Museum in Montauban)
- Eberhard Hinkel (Distributor, Interart, Paris)
- Hervé Lœvenbruck (Galerie Lœvenbruck, Paris)
- Chantal Herrmann (Editor-in-Chief, Paris Mômes)
- André Delpuech (Director Museum of Man, Paris)
- Bernard Benoliel (Cinémathèque française)
- Laurence Des Cars (Director, Musée de l'Orangerie in Paris)

2018

- Didier Brousse (Founder and Director Galerie Camera Obscura)
- Didier Ottinger (Director Centre Pompidou Paris)
- Alexandre Curnier (Director Noto Magazine)
- Samuel Hoppe (Director Volume artbook shop Paris)
- Pierre Samoyault (Director Interart Paris)
- Stéphane Corréard (Director at the Parisian art fair Galeristes)
- Alba Zamolo (Director youth artbook shop in the Louvre Museum Paris)
- Patricia Falguières (Teacher at EHESS)

2019

- Alba Zamolo (Director youth Artbooks shop in the Louvre Museum, Paris)
- Matthieu Conquet (Radio journalist at France Culture)
- Hélène Joubert (Curator, Musée du Quai Branly, Paris)
- Jean-Michel Frodon (Historian, critic, and cinema journalist)
- Samuel Hoppe (Director at the Volume library, Paris)
- Jean-Hubert Martin (Curator and former director of the Centre Pompidou Paris and Kunsthalle in Bern)

2020

- Alba Zamolo (Director youth Artbooks shop in the Louvre Museum, Paris)
- Matthieu Conquet (Radio journalist at France Culture)
- Hélène Joubert (Curator, Musée du Quai Branly, Paris)
- Jean-Michel Frodon (Historian, critic, and cinema journalist)
- Samuel Hoppe (Director at the Volume library, Paris)
- Stéphane Corréard (Director of the Parisian art fair Galeristes)
- Guillaume Kientz (Director of the Hispanic Society Museum, New-York)
- Sébastien Gokalp (Director at the Musée de l'histoire de l'immigration)

== Juries ==
2012

- Catherine Millet, editor-in-chief of the art review art press and Honorary President of the jury
- Fabrice Hergott, director at Musée d'Art Moderne de la Ville de Paris
- Guillaume Houzé, sponsorship director in Galeries Lafayette Group
- Xavier Cannone, director at Photography Museum in Charleroi
- Pierre Thoretton, filmmaker.

2013

- Robert Storr, art critic and Honorary President of the jury
- Jean-Paul Boucheny, filmmaker and producer
- Jennifer Flay, director of the Fiac (Foire Internationale d’Art Contemporain, Paris)
- Line Ouellet, director at Musée national des beaux-arts du Québec
- Éric de Chassey, director at the French Academy in Rome
- Laurent Le Bon, director at the Picaso Museum in Paris
- Marta Gili, director at Galerie nationale du Jeu de Paume in Paris.

2014

- Stéphane Corréard, director of the Contemporary art fair in Montrouge and Jury President
- Laure Flammarion, filmmaker
- Laurent Brancowitz, musician in the band Phoenix and collector
- Simon Baker, photography curator at the Tate Modern in London
- Luciano Rigolini, producer at Arte
- Patricia Falguières, art historian and president of the Centre national des arts plastiques.

2015

- Albert Serra, Catalan filmmaker and Jury President
- Aurélien Bellanger, author, Prix de Flore 2014
- Dominique Païni, art critic and curator
- Anne Tronche, art critic
- Nazanin Pouyandeh, artist.

2016

> Book jury

- Jean-Hubert Martin, curator and Jury President
- Chiara Parisi, director of the cultural action at Monnaie de Paris
- Olivier Gabet, director at Musée des Arts Décoratifs, Paris
- Marco Velardi, editor-in-chief of the art and design review Apartamento.

> Film jury

- Charles de Meaux, filmmaker, producer, co-founder at Ana Sanders Films and Jury President
- Catherine Derosier-Pouchous, producer for the film productions in Musée du Louvre, Paris
- Jean-Pierre Devillers, filmmaker
- Matthieu Copeland, curator and co-founder at Ana Sanders Films

2017

> Book jury

- Nicolas Bourriaud, Director of the Montpellier Contemporain (MoCo) and president of the jury
- Florence Loewy, eponym gallery and library in Paris
- Grégoire Robinne, Fondator of Dilecta's editions
- Nicolas Daubanes, artist

>Film jury

- Clément Cogitore, movie director and president of the jury
- Colette Barbier, Directress of the Ricard business foundation
- Vicenç Altaió (ca), actor
- Thomas Levy-Lasne, painter, author, actor and scenarist

2018

>Book jury

- Bernard Marcadé, art critic and expository commissioner
- Léa Bismuth, art critic and expository commissioner
- Eric Mangion, director of the Art Center of the Arson Villa in Nice (Côte d'Azur)
- Arnaud Labelle-Rojaux, author and artist

>Film jury

- Cristian Mungiu, film director, scenarist, producer and president of the jury
- Virginie Jacquet, Directress of the gallery and the librairie du Jour agnès b
- Eduard Escoffet, poet
- Valérie Mréjen, novelist, videographer and visual artist

2019

>Book jury

- Marc Olivier Wahler (Director Museum, exhibition curator, and art critic)
- Thomas Clerc (Writer, columnist and performer)
- Alicia Kopf (Graduated in art and literature, multimedia artist and writer)
- Anne-Sarah Bénichou (Director of the eponymous gallery)
- Christoph Doswald (Publicist, curator, and university lecture)

>Film jury

- Joaquim Sapinho (movie director, producer, and artist)
- Morgane Tschiember (Director of the Calouste-Gulbenkian Museum)
- Penelope Curtis (director of the Calouste-Gulbenkian Museum)
- Abdelkader Benchamma (contemporary artist)

2020

>Book jury

- Bertrand Belin (Guitarist, singer, and writer)
- Frank Perrin (Philosopher, critic, review and magazines creator, photographer of post-capitalism)
- Cécile Debray (Director of the Musée de l'Orangerie, Paris)

>Film jury

- Lucie Rico (Director, scriptwriter, and novelist)
- Leopold Rabus (painter)
- Neil Beloufa (artist and movie director)

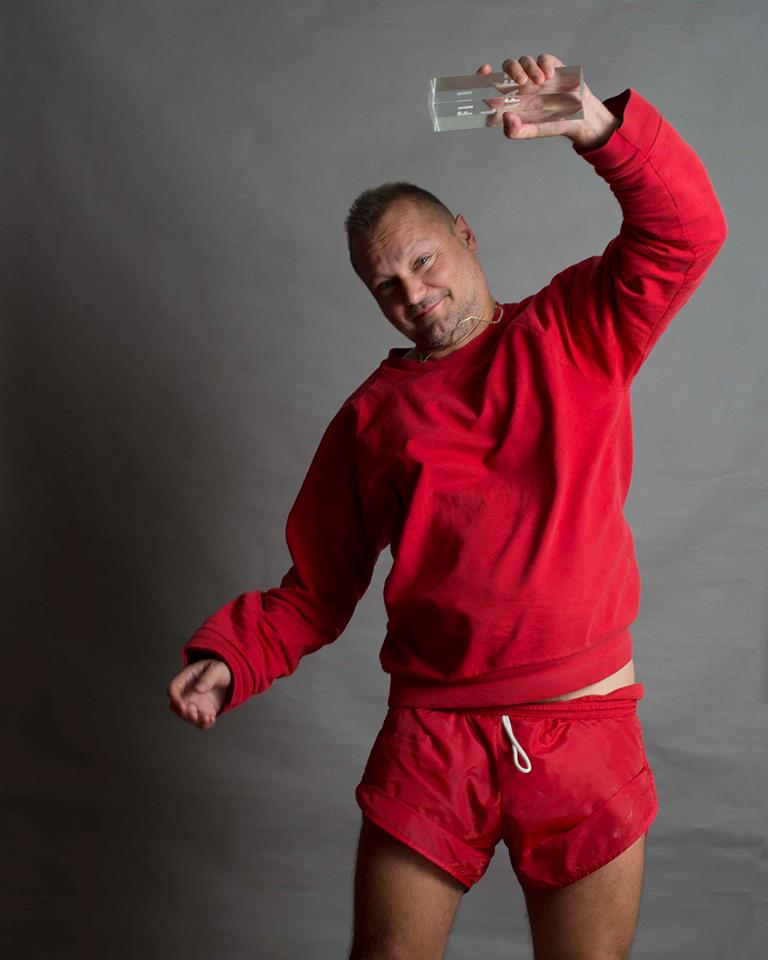
FILAF 2013 - Juergen Teller

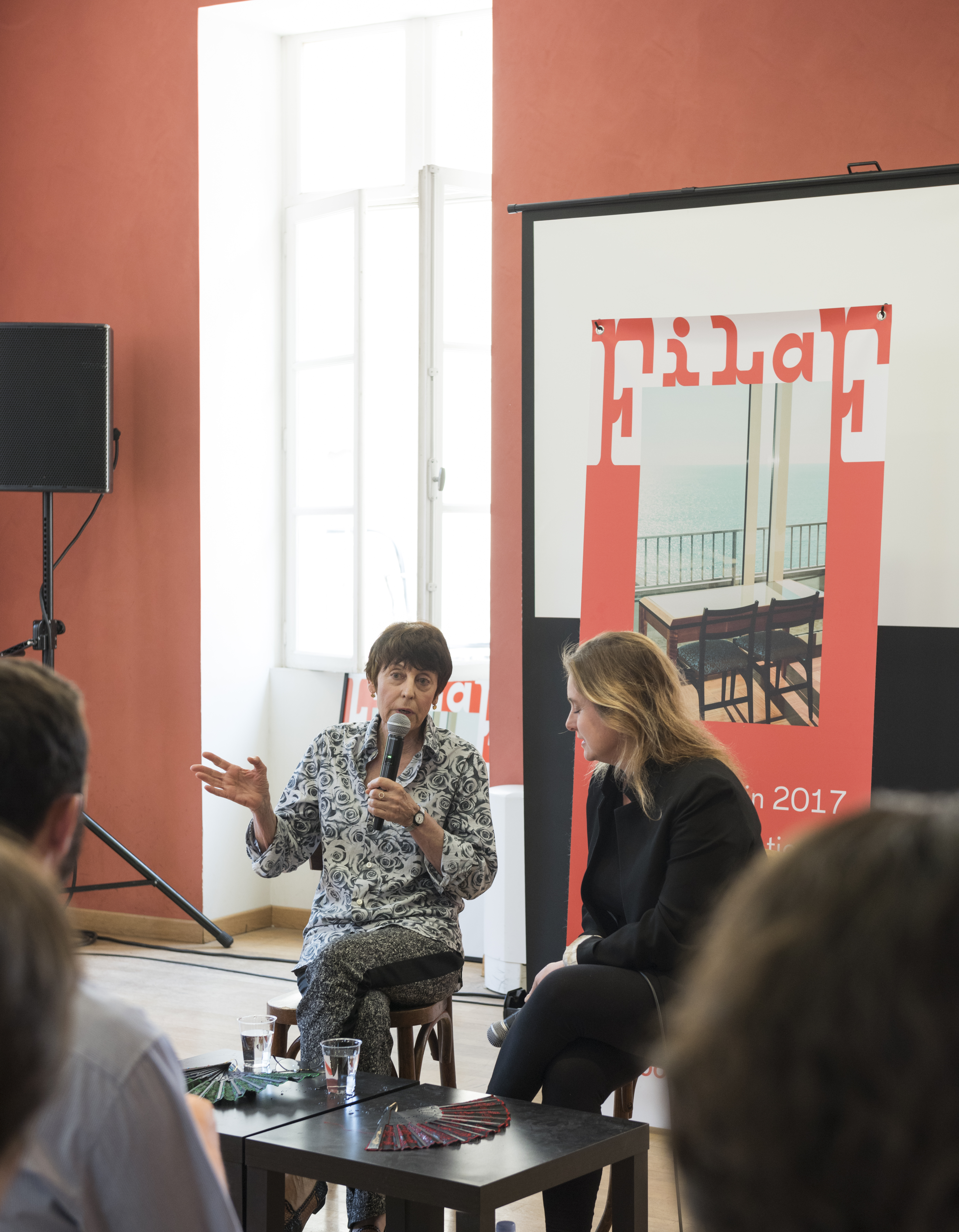
FILAF 2017 - Discussion between Annette Messager and Chiara Parisi during the seventh edition of FILAF in 2017

== Guests of Honour ==
- 2012: Matali Crasset, Yves Michaud, Ferran Adrià, Werner Hoffman
- 2013: Nathalie Heinich, Miquel Barceló
- 2014: Joan Roca i Fontané
- 2015: Philippe Djian
- 2016: Michel Houellebecq, Matali Crasset, Julien Carreyn, Enrique Vila-Matas, Gérard Garouste
- 2018: Gilles Barbier, Nicolas Godin, Luke Rhinehart
- 2019: Yannick Haenel, Jacqueline Caux, Michael Blackwood, Fabrice Hyber, Raymond Pettibon, Collection Phares
- 2020: Bêka & Lemoine, Jean-Philippe Toussaint, Joan Fontcuberta, Phoenix, Olivier Assayas

== Honor Price ==
- 2011 : Jean-Paul Boucheny
- 2012 : Adrian Maben
- 2013 : Juergen Teller
- 2014 : Daniel Buren, André S. Labarthe, Roman Signer
- 2015 : Sophie Calle, Agnès Varda, Alain Fleischer
- 2016: Bertrand Lavier, Kenneth Goldsmith
- 2017 : Jef Cornelis, Annette Messager, Jean-Michel Alberola, Jean-Yves Jouannais
- 2018 : Michel Auder, Pere Portabella, Alain Jaubert, Bruno Monsaingeon
- 2019: Raymond Pettibon, Aube Breton-Elléouët / Collections Phares, Jacqueline Caux, Michael Blackwood
- 2020: Bêka & Lemoine, Joan Fontcuberta, Jean-Philippe Toussaint

== Expositions ==
- 2014 : Leopold Rabus - Till Rabus - Chad Moore - Arnaud Pyvka. Exposition collective, FILAF Galery, Perpignan
- 2014 : Abdelkader Benchamma, Random, FILAF Galery, Perpignan
- 2015 : Pascal Ferro, FILAF Galery, Perpignan
- 2015 : Carlos Barrantes, FILAF Galery, Perpignan
- 2015 / 2016 : Rodore, FILAF Galery, Perpignan
- 2016 : Michel Houellebecq, Before Landing, Tiers-Ordre Chapel, Perpignan
- 2016 : Carine Brancowitz - Faustine Cornette de Saint Cyr. Exposition collective, Galerie du FILAF, Perpignan
- 2016 / 2017 : Cédric Torne, FILAF Galery, Perpignan
- 2017 : David Lynch, Works on Paper, Tiers-Ordre Chapel, Perpignan
- 2017 : Jean-Michel Alberola, Scénarios, FILAF Galery, Perpignan
- 2017 / 2018 : Nicolas Daubanes, Sign of the Times, FILAF Galery, Perpignan
- 2018 : Pierre et Gilles, Le Génie du Christianisme, Minimes Convent, Perpignan
- 2018 : Alexandre Leger, Oeuvres Récentes, FILAF Galery, Perpignan
- 2019 : ALBEROlaBELLEROJOUX, Couvent des Minimes, Perpignan / Gilles Barbier, FILAF gallery, Perpignan
- 2020 : Till Rabus, Natures Mortes Acrobatiques, FILAF Galery, Perpignan / Toma Dutter, Alexis Gallissaires, Mathieu Legrand, Clara Claus, Max Wyse, Julien Laporte, Charles-Henry Sommelette, Quentin Spohn and others, Decameron, Centro Espagnol, Perpignan

== Awards ==
2011

Books

- Best African artbook : African Lace, a history of trade, creativity and fashion in Nigeria by Nath Mayo Adediran and Barbara Plankensteiner, Snoeck, Austria, 2010
- Best architecture book : CCCP - Cosmic Communist Constructions Photographed by Frédéric Chaubin, Taschen, Germany / France, 2011
- Best modern art book : Gérard Gasiorowski - Recommencer, commencer de nouveau la peinture by Thomas West, Frédéric Bonnet, Éric Mangion, Laurent Manœuvre and Erik Verhagen, Hajte Cantz, France / Germany, 2010
- Best contemporary art book : Monographie de Bernard Dufour by Fabrice Hergott, de la Différence, France, 2010
- Best fine art book : Jacob Van Loo, 1614-1670 by David Mandrella, Arthena, France, 2011
- Best book about an art collection : Art and Activism : Projects of John and Dominique de Menil by Laureen Schipsi and Josef Helfenstein, Laureen Schipsi & Josef Helfenstein / The Menil Collection, USA, 2010
- Best artbook about the 19th Century : Jean-Léon Gerôme by Laurence des Cars, Édouard Papet and Dominique de Font-Réaulx, Skira / Flammarion, USA / France, 2010
- Best photography book : Fénautrigues by Jean-Luc Moulène and Marc Touitou, La Table Ronde, France, 2010
- Best book about cinema : Opération Dragon de Robert Clouse by Bernard Benoliel, Yellow Now, Belgium, 2010
- Best design book : Campana Brothers, Complete Works (So Far) by Darrin Alfred, Deyan Sudjic, Li Edelkoort, Stephan Hamel and Cathy Lang Hö, Rizzoli / Albion, USA, 2010
- Best artbook for youth : Animaux à mimer by Alexandre Rodtchenko and Serguei Mikhaïlovitch Tretiakov, Memo, Russia / France, 2010
- "Grand Prix du jury" : African Lace, a history of trade, creativity and fashion in Nigeria by Nath Mayo Adediran and Barbara Plankensteiner, Snoeck, 2010, Austria

2012

Books

- Golden FILAF : Scrapbook - Gilles Caron by Marianne Caron-Montely, Lienart, France, 2012
- Silver FILAF : Saul Bass : A Life in Film & Design by Pat Kirkham and Jennifer Bass, Laurence King Publishing, England, 2011
- Special Jury Prize : Fritz Lang au travail by Bernard Eisenschitz, Phaïdon, Austria, 2011

Films

- Golden FILAF : Mendelsohn’s incessant visions by Duki Dror, 71 min, 2011 (Germany / Israel), prod. : Zigote Films
- Silver FILAF : Marina Abramovic, the artist is present by Matthew Akers, 1h46, 2012 (USA), prod. : Show of Force / HBO / MoMA
- Special Jury Prize : Jean-Olivier Hucleux by Virgile Novarina, 60 min, 2011 (France), prod. : a.p.r.è.s. productions / Virgile Novarina
- « Coup de Cœur » Prize : Somewhere to disappear by Laure Flammarion and Arnaud Uyttenhove, 57 min, 2011 (France), prod. : MAS Films

2013

Books

- Golden FILAF ex-æquo : L'Art des années 60 by Anne Tronche, Hazan, France, 2012
- Golden FILAF ex-æquo : Gustav Klimt, Tout l’œuvre peint by Tobias G. Natter, Taschen
- Silver FILAF : Annales du cinéma français, les voies du silence, 1895-1929 by Pierre Lherminier, Nouveau Monde, France
- Special Jury Prize : Fully booked, ink on paper : Design & Concepts for New Publications by Andrew Losowsky, Gestalten

Films

- Golden FILAF ex-æquo : Le siècle de Cartier- Bresson by Pierre Assouline, 55 min, 2012 (France), prod. : Arte France / INA / Cinétévé / Henri Cartier-Bresson Foundation;
- Golden FILAF ex-æquo : Sol LeWitt by Chris Teerink, 72 min, 2012 (Netherlands), coprod. : Doc.eye.film / AVRO télévision
- Silver FILAF : Dalí, génie tragi-comique by François et Stéphan Lévy-Kuentz, 52 min, 2012 (France), prod. : INA / Centre Georges Pompidou / AVRO / France 5 / RTBF / RAI educational / SBS
- Special Jury Prize : Hélio Oiticica by Cesar Oiticica Filho, 94 min, 2012 (Brasil), prod. Guerrilha Filmes

2014

Books

- Golden FILAF : Guy de Cointet by Frédéric Paul, Flammarion, France
- Silver FILAF : Peter Zumthor Buildings & Projects, 1985-2013 by Thomas Durisch and Peter Zumthor, Scheidegger et Spiess editions
- Special Jury Prize : Lalibela : capitale de l'art monolithe d'Éthiopie by Claude Lepage and Jacques Mercier, Picard editions, France

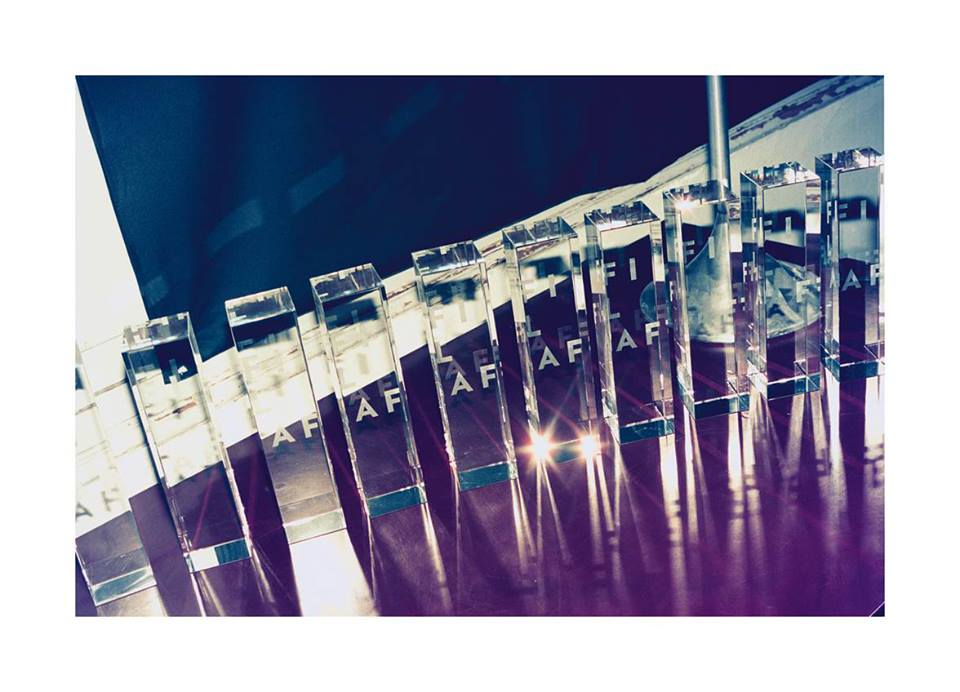
FILAF trophies

Films

- Golden FILAF : Tarr Béla, I used to be a filmmaker by Jean-Marc Lamoure, prod. MPM Film
- Silver FILAF : The Great Museum by Johannes Holzhausen, prod. Navigator Film
- Special Jury Prize : Haus Tugendhat by Dieter Reifarth, prod. Strandfilm et Pandora Film

2015

Books

- Golden FILAF : African modernism, The Architecture of Independence. Ghana, Senegal, Côte d'Ivoire, Kenya, Zambia by Manuel Herz, Park Books, Swiss, 2015
- Silver FILAF : Earthquakes, Mudslides, Fires & Riots: California & Graphic Design, 1936-1986 by Louise Sandhaus, Metropolis Books, USA, 2015
- Special Jury Prize : L'Industrie d'art romaine tardive by Alois Riegl, Christopher S. Wood and Emmanuel Alloa, Macula, France, 2014

Films

- Golden FILAF : Paul Sharits by François Miron, 85’, 2015 (Canada), prod : Filmgrafix Production
- Silver FILAF : ART WAR by Marco Wilms, 90’, 2014 (Germany), prod : Heldenfilm / ZDF / Arte / MFG Filmförderung Baden-Württemberg
- Special Jury Prize : Sobre la marxa by Jordi Morató 77’, 2014 (Spain), prod : La Termita Films / Universitat Pompeu Fabra

2016

Books

- Golden FILAF : Avant l'Avant-Garde. Du jeu en photographie, 1890-1940 by Clément Chéroux, Textuel, France, 2015
- Silver FILAF : Impondérable. The Archives of Tony Oursler by Tony Oursler, JRP Ringier / Fondation Luma, Swiss / France, 2015
- Special Jury Prize : Images Take Flight : Feather Art in Mexico and Europe by A. Russo, G. Wolf, D. Fane, Hirmer Publishers, Germany, 2016

Films

- Golden FILAF : Malpartida, Fluxus Village by Maria Perez, 2015 (Spain), prod : Smiz & Pixel, Agencia Audiovisual Freak
- Silver FILAF ex-aequo : Tony Conrad, completely in the present by Tyler Hubby, 2016 (USA), prod : Burning Bridges
- Silver FILAF ex-aequo : Action Space by Huw Wahl, 2016, (England), prod : Huw Wahl and Amanda Ravetz

2017

Books

- Golden FILAF : Intimate Geometries: The Art and Life of Louise Bourgeois de Robert Storr, by Monacelli Press, United States, 2016
- Silver FILAF : Après Babel, traduire by Barbara Cassin, Actes Sud / MuCEM, France, 2016
- Special Jury Prize : Cedric Price Works 1952 - 2003 : A Forward-Minded Retrospective by Samantha Hardingham, Architectural Association Publications / Canadian Centre for Architecture, Angleterre / Canada, 2016
- Best youth art book : Why is Art Full of Naked People? : And other vital questions about art by Susie Hodge, Thames & Hudson, England, 2016
- Best book about art theory : Reset Modernity ! by Bruno Latour and Christophe Leclercq, Mit Press, United States, 2016
- Best photographic book : Zone de sécurité temporaire by Anne-Marie Filaire, Textuel, France, 2017
- Best fine art book : Les frères Le Nain, d'après les écrits de Jacques Thuillier by Serge Lemoine, Faton, France, 2016
- Best architecture book : Residential Towers by Annette Gigon, Guyer Mike, Felix Jerusalem, GTA, Switzerland, 2016
- Best graphism book : Histoire de l'écriture typographique, le XXè siècle (2 volumes) dir. Jacques André, Perrousseaux Atelier, France, 2016
- Best contemporary art book : Intimate Geometries: The Art and Life of Louise Bourgeois by Robert Storr, The Monacelli Press, United States, 2016
- Best modern art book : William N. Copley by Germano Celant, Fondazione Prada, The Menil Collection, Italy / United States, 2016
- Price of the youth book médiathèque of Perpignan : Draw Like an Artist: A Self-Portrait Sketchbook by Patricia Geis, Princeton Architectural Press, United States, 2016

Films

- Golden FILAF : Where is Rocky II ? by Pierre Bismuth (FR - ALL - IT - BELG), 93 min, 2016. Prod. : The Ink Connection / Vandertastic / Frakas Productions / In Between Art Film / Vivo Film
- Silver FILAF : Cinema Novo by Eryk Rocha (BR), 92 min, 2016. Prod. : Coqueirao Pictures / Aruac Filmes / Canal Brasil / FM Produçoes
- Special Jury Prize : Exprmntl by Brecht Debackere (BEL), 68 min, 2016. Prod. : Visualantics Production / Cinematek / RTBF / Canvas

2018

Books

- Golden FILAF : Philip Guston : Nixon Drawings. 1971 & 1975 by Musa Mayer and Debra Bricker Balken, Hauser & Wirth, Switzerland, 2017
- Silver FILAF: Architecture of Counterrevolution : The French Army in Northern Algeria by Samia Henni, gta Verlag, Switzerland, 2017
- Special Jury Prize : Guy de Cointet - Théâtre complet de Hugues Decointet, François Piron, Marilou Thiébault, Paraguay Press, France, 2017
- Best youth art book : 5 maisons de Dominique Ehrhard, Les grandes personnes, France, 2017
- Best book about art theory : Architecture of Counterrevolution : The French Army in Northern Algeria by Samia Henni, gta Verlag, Switzerland, 2017
- Best photographic book : Sally Mann, a thousand crossings by Sarah Kennel, Abrams, USA, 2018
- Best fine arts book : Johan Maelwael. Nijmegen - Paris - Dijon. Art around 1400 by Pieter Roelofs, Nai010, Netherlands, 2017
- Best architecture book : Handbook of Tyranny by Theo Deutinger, Lars Muller, Switzerland, 2018
- Best contemporary art book : Le monde de Topor by Laurence Engel, Frédéric Pagak and alli., Les cahiers dessinés, France, 2017
- Best modern art book : Philip Guston : Nixon Drawings. 1971 & 1975 by Musa Mayer and Debra Bricker Balken, Hauser & Wirth, Switzerland, 2017
- Best primitive arts book : Maternité. Mères et enfants dans les arts d’Afrique by Herbert M. Cole, Fonds Mercator, Belgium, 2017
- Best music book : Ni noires, ni blanches : Histoire des musiques créoles, by Bertrand Dicale, éditions La Rue Musicale, France, 2017
- Best culinary arts : Kalamata : La cuisine, la famille et la Grèce by Martin Bruno and Julia Sammut, Editions Keribus, 2017

This prize was created in association with Maison Sales, Végétaux d'Art Culinaire.

- Prize of the youth book of the médiathèque de Perpignan : 5 maisons by Dominique Ehrhard, Les grandes personnes, France, 2017

Movies

- Golden FILAF : Moriyama-San by Louise Lemoine and Ila Bêka, 2017, 107' (FR). Prod. : Bêka & Partners
- Silver FILAF: Beuys by Andres Veil, 2017, 107’ (DE). Prod. : Zero one film in co-production, Terz Filmproduktion, SWR/ARTE, WDR
- Special jury prize: Une poétique de l'habiter by Caroline Alder and Damien Faure, 2018, 60' (FR). Prod. : Caroline Alder and Damien Faure. Film shown in world premiere.

2019

Books

- Golden FÌLAF: The birth of a Style Alteration Video, Fosbury Architecture Humboldt Books, Italie, 2018
- Silver FILAF: Jean-Jacques Lequeu : bâtisseur de fantasmes, L. Baridon, J-P Garric et alli. Norma / BnF, France, 2018
- Special jury prize: Pascale Ogier, Ma soeur, E. Nicolas, Filigranes Editions, France, 2018
- Youth category and Library Prize: Art'Bracadabra, découverte des ingrédients magiques de l'oeuvre d'art, R. Garnier, Amaterra / Centre Pompidou, France, 2018
- Cinema category: Zones de guerre, J. Saab, E. Sanbar, E. Adnan, editions de l'Oeil, France, 2018
- Photography category: The map and the territory, L. Ghirri, Mack Books, Allemagne, 2018.
- Food category: Manger à l'oeil, edition de l'Épure / Mucem, France, 2019
- Fine Arts category: Bruegel, Bill Traylor, V. Rousseau, D. Purden, 5 continents, Italie, 2018
- Architecture category: Group Ludic. L'imagination au pouvoir, X. de la Salle, D. Roditi, S. Koszel, Facteur Humain, Belgique, 2019
- Musique category: Art & Vinyl: a visual record, J. Fraenkel, A. De Beaupré. Fraenkel Gallery / éditions Antoine de Beaupré, USA / France, 2018
- Contemporary art category: Isidore Isou, F. Acquaviva, Edition du Griffon, Suisse 2019
- Primitive Arts category: Galerie Pigralle. Afrique, Océanie, 1930. Une exposition mythique, C-W. Hourdé, N. Rollan. Somogy Editions d'Art, France, 2018

Films

- Golden FILAF: That Cloud Never Left, Yashaswini Raghunandan, India, 2019, 65'. Prod: Namita Waiker, P.Sainath, Yashaswini Raghunandan
- Silver FILAF: Le Premier mouvement de l'immobile, Sebastiano d'Ayala Valva, France, Italy, 2018, 81'. Pro/diff: le films de la Butte, Ideacinama, Arte Geie, Radio France
- Special jury prize: Delphine et Carole Insoumuses, Callisto Mc Nulty, France, Switzerland, 2018, 68'. Prod: les films de la butte
- Special jury prize: Creation from the obscure, Tomoya Use, Japan, 2018, 59'. Pro: Nozomu Makino, Shinichi Ise, Hiroaki Fukushima, Toshihide Yabuki

2020

Books

- Golden FILAF: Alternative Histories, Marius Grootveld, Jantje Engels, Guus Kaandorp, Thomas Dank, Mathias Clottu, ed. Drawing Matter, 2019
- Silver FILAF: Journal d'un maître d'école. Le film, un livre, Vittorio de Seta, Federico Rossin, ed. Arachnéen, 2019
- Special jury prize: Nathalie Parain, Michèle Cochet, Michel Defourny and Claude-Anne Parmegiani, ed. MéMO, 2019
- Contemporary art category: Elizabeth Peyton: aire and angels, Elizabeth Peyton, Jules Esteves, Lucy Dahlsen, ed. National Portrait Gallery, London, 2019
- Fine arts category: Black in Rembrandt's time, Elmer Kolfin and Epco Runia, ed. W. BOOKS, 2020
- Primitive arts category: Striking Iron: the art of African blacksmiths, gathering of 18 authors, ed. Fowler Museum at UCLA, LA, 2020
- Music category: Jim Marshall: show me the picture - images and stories from a photography legend, Amelia Davis, ed. Chronicle Books, 2019
- Modern art category : object of desire - surrealism and design : 1924 - today, Mateo Kries, ed. Vitra Design Museum, 2019

Films

- Golden FILAF: Etre Jérôme Bel, Sima Khatami et Aldo Lee, 2019, 79'
- Silver FILAF: Palimpsest of the Africa museum, Matthias De Groof, 2019, 69'
- Special jury prize: The Poposal, Jill Magid, 2019, 83'
- Special jury prize: Book, paper, scissors, Hirose Nakano, 2019, 94'
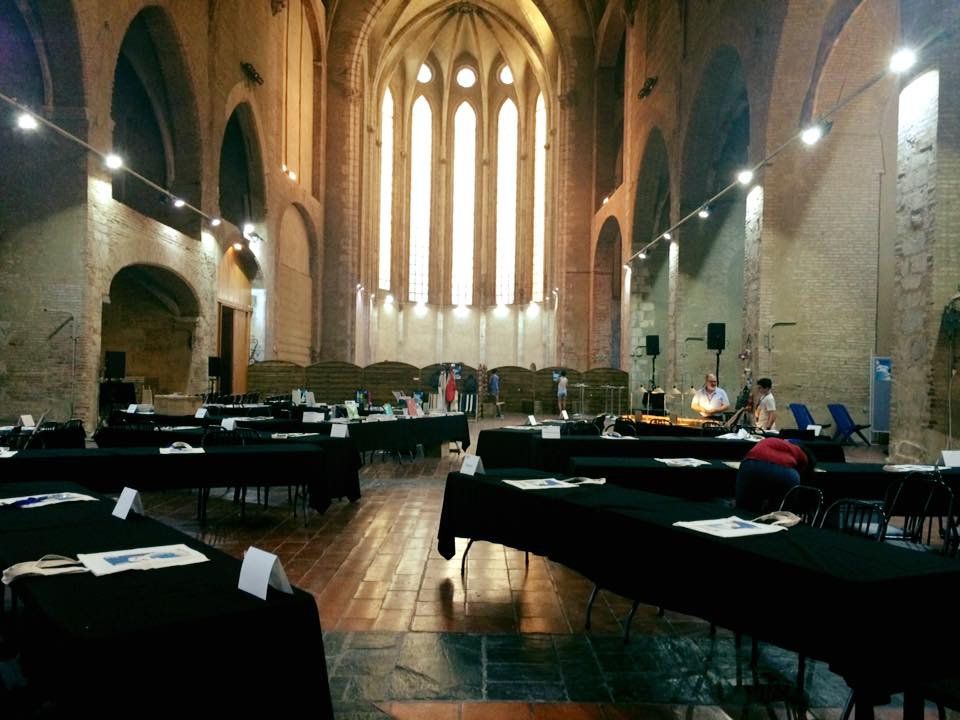
  FILAF Artbook Fair - installation in progress

== FILAF Artbook Fair ==
In 2016, the festival created the FILAF Artbook Fair. The first edition of this show was held from the 24th to 26 June 2016 in the Dominican church in Perpignan.

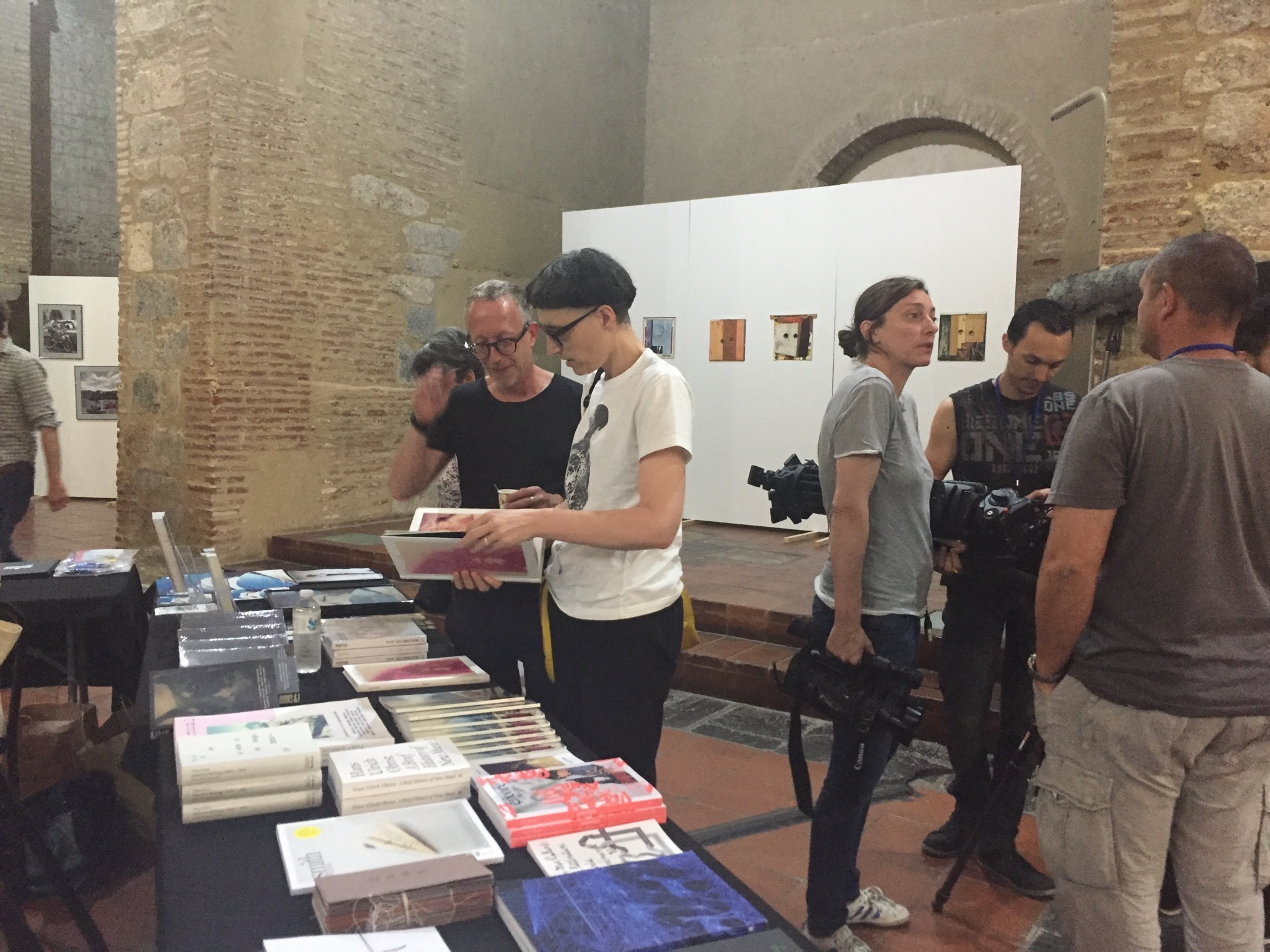
FILAF Artbook Fair 2016

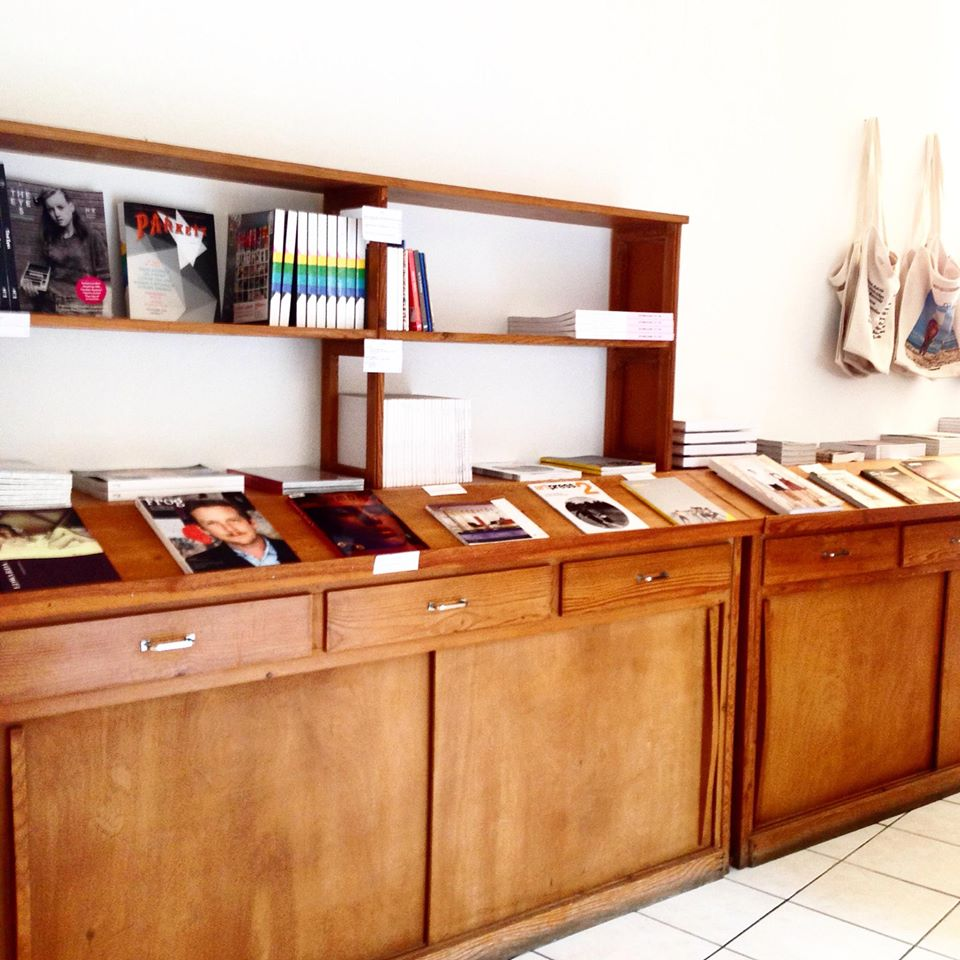
FILAF art bookstore

The FILAF Artbook Fair is a meeting place for publishers and the general public. It offers contemporary editorial practices linking art and print: a book on art, a book of art, multiples, fanzines, catalogs, posters and unpublished projects.

== Publications: filaf annual review ==
filaf annual is an annual magazine about artbooks and films.

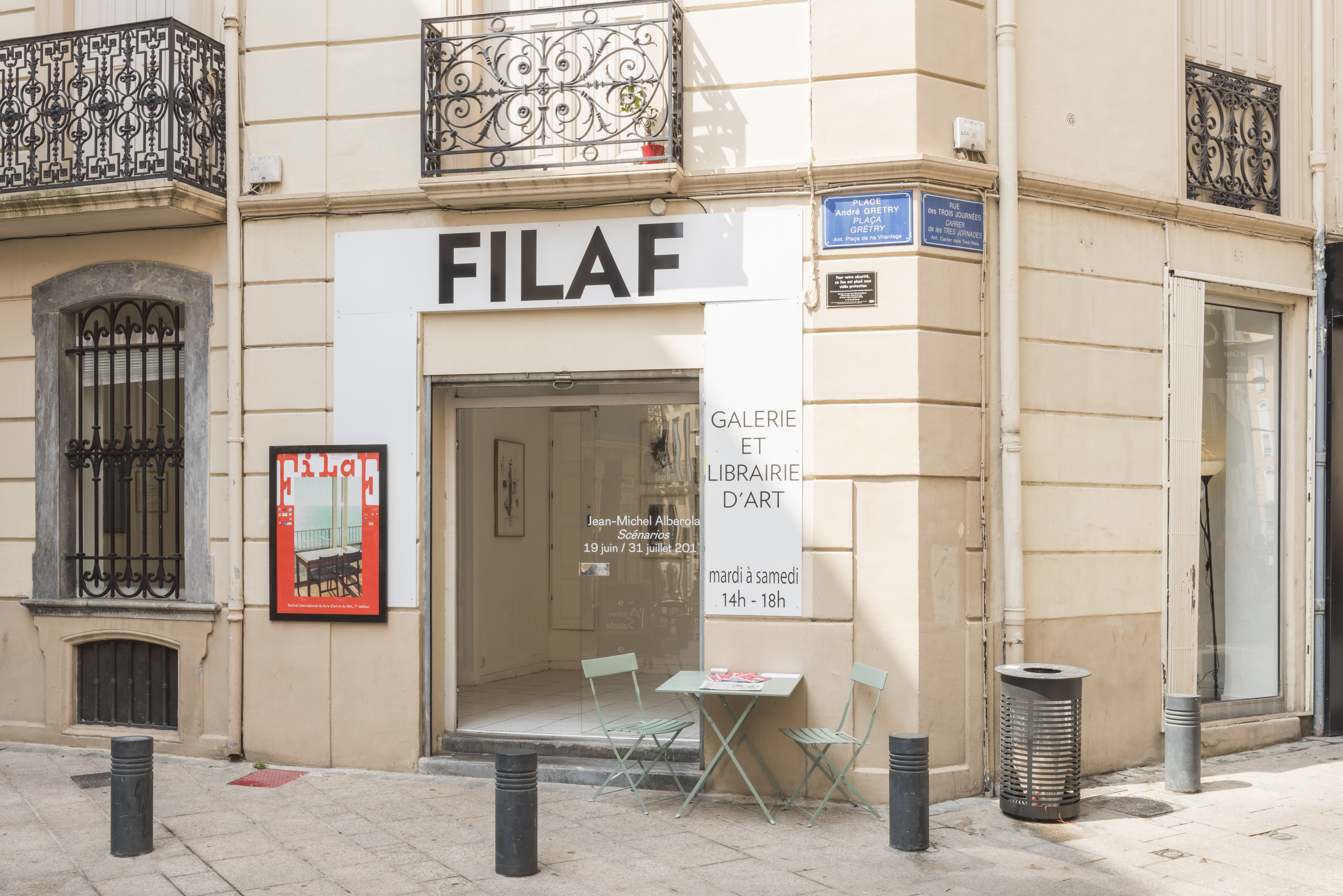
FILAF Gallery Perpignan

== The FILAF Gallery / Art Library ==
Open year-round, it completes the regional offer by presenting temporary exhibitions of contemporary art. It invites selected artists to produce works combining literature, cinema and drawing.

== The FILAF / Galeristes Award ==
In 2016, the Filaf inaugurated the Filaf / Galeristes Prize, an award celebrating the best art book published by an art gallery. The event takes place during a contemporary art fair created in 2016 by French curator Stéphane Corréard. It has since its inception rewarded five books.
