= Esra Akcan =

Turkish-American architect, academic and author

- Born: Turkey
- Occupations: Architect, academic and author
- Awards: Carter Manny Award, Graham Foundation; Berlin Prize, American Academy in Berlin

Academic background
- Education: Bachelors, Architecture; Masters of Philosophy; Doctor of Philosophy
- Alma mater: Middle East Technical University; Columbia University
- Thesis: Modernity in Translation: Early 20th Century German-Turkish Exchanges in Land Settlement and Residential Culture.

Academic work
- Institutions: Cornell University

Esra Akcan is a Turkish-American architect, academic and author. Currently, she is the Michael A. McCarthy Professor in the Department of Architecture and the resident director of Institute for Comparative Modernities at Cornell University.

Akcan’s research on modern and contemporary architecture and urbanism focuses on the intertwined histories of Europe and West Asia, and on understanding architecture’s role in global, social and environmental justice. Akcan has also authored over 150 research articles on critical and postcolonial theory, racism, immigration, architectural photography, translation, neoliberalism, and global history.

Akcan has received numerous awards and fellowships including Carter Manny Award from Graham Foundation and the Berlin Prize from American Academy in Berlin.

== Education ==
She completed her Bachelor's and Master’s degree in architecture from the Middle East Technical University in Turkey. She then moved to USA and earned her M.Phil., Ph.D. and postdoctoral degrees from Columbia Graduate School of Architecture, Planning and Preservation in New York.

== Career ==
Prior to joining Cornell in 2014, Akcan was a faculty member in the Department of Art History at the University of Illinois at Chicago (UIC), where she progressed from Assistant to Associate Professor and served as an Honors College Faculty Fellow. At UIC, she taught courses on contemporary architecture, global art history, and urban housing, and introduced critical seminars such as “Architecture of the Cosmopolis” and “Housing in the Metropolis and the Global City.” Her teaching emphasized postcolonial theory, migration, and the politics of design, continuing the themes that underpin her scholarly work. Earlier in her career, Akcan held a postdoctoral lectureship at Columbia University’s Core Curriculum program, teaching the required Contemporary Civilization seminars.

She also taught as an adjunct and preceptor at Columbia’s Graduate School of Architecture, Planning and Preservation (GSAPP), as well as at the Parsons School of Design and Pratt Institute in New York.

Akcan began her teaching career as a teaching assistant at the Middle East Technical University (METU) in Ankara, where she earned her architecture degree. She later received her Ph.D. and postdoctoral training at Columbia University.

Akcan’s scholarly contributions have been recognized with numerous fellowships and awards. These include grants from Cornell’s Einaudi Center for International Studies, Mui Ho Center for Cities, and the Cornell Migration Initiative; a Frieda Miller Fellowship at the Radcliffe Institute for Advanced Study at Harvard University (2019–20).

She received publication and research grants from the Graham Foundation and the Canadian Centre for Architecture; and the Berlin Prize from the American Academy in Berlin (2016–17).

She has held fellowships at the Getty Research Institute, the Clark Art Institute, the Institute for Advanced Study in Berlin, and Rechtskulturen at Humboldt University. Her work has been supported by the Mellon Foundation, DAAD, KRESS/ARIT, and Columbia University’s GSAPP, which awarded her distinction for her M.Phil exam and funded her doctoral studies.

== Research ==
Akcan’s research on modern and contemporary architecture and urbanism explains the intertwined histories of the world, with special emphasis on Europe and West Asia. She specializes in architectural history and theory, along with migration and diaspora studies. Her research explores the geopolitically conscious design practice, critical and postcolonial theory, immigration, translation, racism, architectural photography and neoliberalism.

Akcan's 2012 book Architecture in Translation: Germany Turkey and the Modern House applies the idea of translation to the history of architecture, extending it beyond language and into visual spaces. In the book, she studies the cultural exchange of architects and ideas between Germany and Turkey, drawing upon residential design from the 1920's to the 1950's. She traces how models such as the garden city and mass housing were transformed as they moved into the early Turkish republic. In a review for Comparative Studies of South Asia, Africa and the Middle East, Kyle T. Evered of Michigan State University described the book as "an ideal first step" toward analyzing this sort of cross-cultural exchange more critically.

Her earlier work, Landfill Istanbul: Twelve Scenarios for a Global City (2004), presented visions for Istanbul’s urban development. She also co-authored Turkey: Modern Architectures in History (2012) with Sibel Bozdoğan, and collaborated with Bernd Nicolai on Building in Exile: Bruno Taut in Turkey (2019).

Akcan published ‘’Open Architecture: Migration, Citizenship and the Urban Renewal of Berlin-Kreuzberg by IBA-1984/87’’ in 2018. This book defines open architecture as the translation of a new ethics of hospitality into design process and focuses on formal, programmatic and procedural steps towards open architecture during the urban renewal of Berlin’s immigrant neighborhood. In a positive review of the book, Clemens Filkenstein wrote that “Open Architecture, with its innovative methodology and style, becomes a manifesto to propagate not only spaces of hospitality but the writing of ‘open architectural history.’”

In her work, Akcan frequently critiques dominant models of architectural cosmopolitanism rooted in Enlightenment universalism, which she argues can mask structures of racial, class-based, and cultural exclusion. Drawing from postcolonial theory, she calls for a new ethics of hospitality and “cosmopolitanism from below” that centers the lived experiences of immigrants and noncitizen residents. She sees architecture not merely as a form or object but as a medium of political expression and ethical action.

Akcan also integrates her academic research with curatorial and artistic practice. She has produced multimedia installations and performances to accompany her research, including Adding a Layer Under the Mercator Grid, exhibited at the 2012 Istanbul Design Biennial, and Freedom of Information, a photographic and sculptural work that became the cover image of Open Architecture. Her installation Couplings featured oral histories of architects and immigrant residents in Kreuzberg, presented as a multi-screen video installation. These projects reflect her methodological emphasis on storytelling, oral history, and the open-ended life of buildings beyond their design.

Her book Building in Exile: Bruno Taut (co-authored with Bernd Nicolai) revisits Taut’s work in Turkey as a framework for thinking about exile, sustainability, and global architectural ethics. In Abolish Human Bans: Intertwined Histories of Architecture (2022), published by the Canadian Centre for Architecture, Akcan extends her theory of architectural translation to critique xenophobic immigration policies and to advocate for activist architectural engagement.

Akcan has also authored more than 150 scholarly articles and essays in multiple languages, exploring topics such as immigration, racism, neoliberalism, architectural photography, postcolonial critique, translation theory, and global architectural history. She co-edited the volume Migration and Discrimination with Iftikhar Dadi and wrote a new book titled Right-to-Heal: Architecture in Transitions After Conflicts and Disasters, which addresses architecture’s role in post-crisis recovery and transitional justice.

== Views and opinions ==
A prominent voice in contemporary architectural theory, Akcan’s work contributes to broader conversations about the role of architecture in conditions of displacement, inequality, and transformation.

Her ongoing projects include the forthcoming book Right-to-Heal: Architecture in Post-Conflict and Post-Disaster Societies, which examines architecture’s role in processes of transitional justice and societal healing following crises such as war, forced migration, economic collapse, or environmental disaster.

== Awards and honors ==
- 2009 - Canadian Center for Architecture (CCA) Visiting Scholar
- 2010 - Arnheim-Professor at Institut für Kunst- und Bildgeschichte, Humboldt University, Berlin.
- 2011 - Fellow, Clark Art Institute
- 2011 - Millard Meiss Publication Grant for Architecture in Translation through Duke University Press, College Art Association
- 2012 - Fellow, Rechtskulturen at the Forum Transregionale Studien
- 2016 - 2017 - Berlin Prize, American Academy in Berlin
- 2017 - Graham Foundation Publication Grant for Open Architecture
- 2019 - Research Fellow, Canadian Center for Architecture
- 2019 - 2020 - Frieda Miller Fellow, Radcliffe Institute for Advanced Study at Harvard University

== Bibliography ==
=== Selected books in English ===
- (Land) Fill Istanbul: Twelve Scenarios for a Global City/Dolgu Istanbul: Küresel Sehre Oniki Senaryo (2004) ISBN 978-9759665029
- Turkey: Modern Architectures in History (2012, with Sibel Bozdoğan) ISBN 978-1861898784
- Architecture in Translation: Germany, Turkey and the Modern House (2012) ISBN 978-0822353089
- Open Architecture: Migration, Citizenship and the Urban Renewal of Berlin-Kreuzberg (2018) ISBN 978-3035613742
- Building in Exile - Bruno Taut: Turkey 1936-1938 (2019) ISBN 978-3721209907
- Abolish Human Bans: Intertwined Histories of Architecture (2022)
- Akcan, Esra (2025). Architecture and the Right to Heal. Duke University Press. doi:10.1353/book.140641. ISBN 978-1-4780-6146-5.
- Akcan, Esra; Dadi, Iftikhar, eds. (2024). Art and architecture of migration and discrimination: Turkey, Pakistan, and their European diasporas. Research in architecture. Abingdon, Oxon: Routledge/Taylor & Francis Group. ISBN 978-1-032-51366-9.

=== Selected articles and chapters ===
- Homo oeconomicus of the ‘New Turkey’: Urban Development of Istanbul in the 2000s, Neoliberalism on the Ground: Architecture and Transformation from the 1960s to the present, Kenny Cupers, Catharina Gabrielsson, and Helena Mattsson (eds) (Pittsburgh: University of Pittsburgh Press, 2020)
- How does architecture heal? AKM as Palimpsest and Ghost South Atlantic Quarterly 118/1, special issue edited by Bülent Küçük and Ceren Özselçuk, January 2019, pp. 81–89.
- Translation Theory and the Intertwined Histories of Building for Self-Governance, in Terms of Appropriation, Ana Miljacki, Amanda Lawrance (eds.) (London: Routledge, 2018)
- Is a Global History of Architecture Displayable? A Historiographical Perspective on the 14th Venice Architecture Biennale and Louvre Abu Dhabi, Art Margins, vol.4, no.1 (January 2015): 79-101.
- Off the Frame: The Panoramic City Albums of Istanbul in Photography’s Orientalism (Los Angeles: Getty Publications, 2013): 93-115
- Akcan, Esra (2022). "Writing Open Architecture as a book on Human Rights (and against Nation-States)". Footprint. 16 (2): 9–20. doi:10.7480/footprint.16.2.6423. ISSN 1875-1490.
- Akcan (2022-09-01), "Architecture, Justice, and Theories of Rights", The Contested Territory of Architectural Theory, London: Routledge, pp. 188–202, doi:10.4324/9781003292999-16, ISBN 978-1-003-29299-9
- Akcan, Esra (2023), "An Unlikely Decolonizer", Architecture in Islamic Countries: Selections from the Catalogue for the Second International Exhibition of Architecture Venice 1982/83, gta Verlag, pp. 71–80, doi:10.54872/gta/4715-04, ISBN 978-3-85676-471-5
- Akcan, Esra (2010-01-25), "Democracy And War", Architecture against Democracy, University of Minnesota Press, pp. 299–320, doi:10.5749/9781452970844-015, ISBN 978-1-4529-7084-4
- Akcan, Esra (2023-08-11), "Partitions and an Anti-Xenophobic Architectural Historiography", Art and Architecture of Migration and Discrimination, London: Routledge, pp. 19–32, doi:10.4324/9781003410010-3, ISBN 978-1-003-41001-0
- Akcan, Esra (2023-08-11), "Kreuzberg and an Anti-Discriminatory Architectural Historiography", Art and Architecture of Migration and Discrimination, London: Routledge, pp. 111–125, doi:10.4324/9781003410010-14, ISBN 978-1-003-41001-0

== See also ==
- Samia Henni
- Rosalys Coope
- Martha Levisman
- Simon Pepper (professor)
