= Samia Henni =

Algerian writer and historian

- Born: Algiers, Algeria
- Occupations: Historian, educator, curator, architect
- Known for: Architecture of Counterrevolution; War Zones; Deserts Are Not Empty; Colonial Toxicity
- Title: Prof. Dr.

Academic background
- Education: – Bachelors, Architecture, Accademia di Architettura di Mendrisio, Università della Svizzera Italiana – Masters of Science, Architecture, Accademia di Architettura di Mendrisio, Università della Svizzera Italiana – Doctor of Science, History and Theory of Architecture, gta Institute, ETH Zurich
- Alma mater: ETH Zurich

Academic work
- Discipline: History of Architecture, Theory of Architecture, Urban Studies, Postcolonial Studies, Critical Theory, Gender Studies, Environmental Humanities
- Institutions: McGill University, Cornell University, Princeton University, ETH Zurich
- Website: samiahenni.com

Samia Henni is an architect, a historian, and an exhibition maker of the built, destroyed, and imagined environments. Currently, she teaches history and theory of architecture at McGill University's Peter Guo-hua Fu School of Architecture. Her teaching focuses on the intersection of the built and destroyed environments with colonial practices and military operations from the early 19th century up to the present days.

== Career ==
Samia Henni studied at the École polytechnique d'architecture et d'urbanisme in Algiers; Accademia di Architettura di Mendrisio, Università della Svizzera Italiana; The Berlage Institute in Rotterdam; and at Goldsmiths, University of London and has received her Ph.D. from ETH Zurich. Before joining McGill University, she has taught in various universities such as Cornell University, Princeton University, ETH Zurich, the University of Zurich, and the University of Applied Sciences in Geneva.

She was the inaugural Albert Hirschman Chair (2021–22) for Identity Passions Between Europe and the Mediterranean at the Institute for Advanced Study (IMéRA) in Marseille; a Visiting Professor (Fall 2021) at the Institute of Art History at the University of Zurich; and a Geddes Visiting Fellow (Spring 2021) at the School of Architecture and Landscape Architecture (ESALA), Edinburgh College of Art, the University of Edinburgh.

Henni is the author of the multi-award-winning Architecture of Counterrevolution: The French Army in Northern Algeria (EN, gta Verlag, 2017, 2024; FR, Edition B42, 2019), in which she examined French colonial territorial transformations and spatial counterinsurgency measures in Algeria under colonial rule, especially during the Algerian Revolution (1954–1962). She is the editor of War Zones: gta papers 2 (gta Verlag 2018) and Deserts Are Not Empty (Columbia Books on Architecture and the city, 2022, 2025).

She has created various exhibitions, including Psychocolonial Spaces (2025–) at Ar/Ge Kunst in Bolzano; Performing Colonial Toxicity (2023–) at Framer Framed in Amsterdam, gta Exhibitions at ETH Zurich, The Mosaic Rooms in London, DOC! in Paris, Kunstraum Bethanian in Berlin, Brown University, Carlton University, and the Centre de design de l'Université du Quebec à Montreal; Discreet Violence: Architecture and the French War in Algeria (2017–2022) at the gta Institute, ETH Zurich; The New Institute in Rotterdam; Archive Kabinett in Berlin; the Graduate School of Architecture, University of Johannesburg, La Colonie in Paris, VI PER Gallery in Prague, AAP Exhibitions at Cornell University, the Twelve Gates Arts in Philadelphia, and the University of Virginia in Charlottesville.

== Writing ==
=== Books ===
- Toxicité coloniale : Documenter le paysage radioactif dans le Sahara. Translated by Marc Saint-Upéry. Paris: Editions B42, 2026. (In French).
- Colonial Toxicity: Rehearsing French Nuclear Architecture and Landscape in the Sahara. Amsterdam: If I Can't Dance and Framer Framed; Zurich: edition fink, 2024, 2025.
- Architecture of Counterrevolution: The French Army in Northern Algeria. Zurich: gta Verlag, 2017, 2024.
- Architecture de la contre-révolution: L'armée française dans le nord de l'Algérie. Translated by Marc Saint-Upéry. Paris: Editions B42, 2019. (In French).
- Ramificaciones coloniales. Galicia. Bartlebooth, 2026. (In Spanish)

=== Edited Volumes ===
- Deserts Are Not Empty. New York: Columbia Books on Architecture and the city, 2022. <br> With contributions from Saphiya Abu Al-Maati, Menna Agha, Asaiel Al Saeed, Dalal Musaed Alsayer, Aseel AlYaqoub, Yousef Awaad, Ariella Aïsha Azoulay, Danika Cooper, Brahim El Guabli, Timothy Hyde, Jill Jarvis, Bongani Kona, Observatoire des armements, Francisco Robles, Paulo Tavares, Alla Vronskaya, and XqSu.
- I deserti non sono vuoti, Italian translation of Deserts Are Not Empty. Translated by Camillo Boano and Antonio Di Campli, Descamino Book Series. Siracusa: Lettera Ventidue, 2024. (In Italian). With contributions from Ariella Aïsha Azoulay, Danika Cooper, Dalal Musaed Alsayer, MariaLuisa Palumbo, Paulo Tavares, and XqSu.
- War Zones: gta papers 2. Zurich: gta Verlag, 2018. With contributions from Nora Akawi, Silvia Berger Ziauddin, Jean-Louis Cohen, Ismae’l Sheikh Hassan, Léopold Lambert, Asja Mandic, Eva Schreiner, Felicity D. Scott, Stanislav von Moos, Alfredo Thiermann, and Daniel Weiss.

=== Book chapters ===
- “Boumedienne, Niemeyer: When Militarism Meets Modernism,” Foreword to The Revolution Will Be Stopped Halfway: Oscar Niemeyer in Algeria. New York: Columbia Books on Architecture and the city, 2019.
- “Female Agency and Psychological Warfare: French Colonial Civil and Military Interventions in Algeria, 1954–1962,” Productive Universals–Specific Situations. Clinical Engagements in Art, Architecture, Design and Urbanism. Berlin: Sternberg Press, 2019.
- “Desertcide: ‘Oil Lakes’ as Archival Violence,” in Space/War edited by Asaiel Al Saeed, Aseel Al Yaqoub, Saphiya Abu Al-Maati, and Yousef Awaad. 2021.
- “Forbidding Homelessness: The State and the First Lockdown in Marseille,” in Who’s Next? We Need to Talk About Homelessness, edited Daniel Talesnik and Andres Lepik. Berlin: ArchiTangle, 2021, 76–81.
- “‘Experience’ Rather Than ‘Project:’ Deluz Pedagogy in Post-revolutionary Algiers,” in Radical Pedagogies, edited by Beatriz Colomina, Ignacio G. Galan, Evangelos Kotsiori and Anna-Maria Meister. Massachusetts: MIT Press, 2022.

=== Essays ===
- “Colonial Ramifications,” e-flux Architecture, History/Theory (October 31, 2018).
- “Photographing Confinement,” Jadaliyya, Photography and Audiovisual Narratives (July 7, 2020).
- “The Coloniality of an Executive Order,” Canadian Centre for Architecture, Journeys and Translations series (June 21, 2020).
- “Exhibition as a Form of Writing: On Discreet Violence: Architecture and the French War in Algeria,” in PARSE journal: On the Question of Exhibition, edited by Nick Aikens, Kjell Caminha, Jyoti Mistry, and Mick Wilson, 2021.
- “Oil, Gas, Dust: From the Sahara to Europe,” in Coloniality of Infrastructure, e-flux Architecture, 2021.
- “Fanon on Colonial Space,” in ARCH+ no. 246 Zeitgenössische feministische Raumpraxis (February 2022): 164–165.
- “The Battle for Internationalization and Independence,” in The Funambulist no. 42: Algerian Independence and Global Revolution 1962–2022 (July–August 2022): 46–53.

== Exhibitions ==
Performing Colonial Toxicity:

- Centre de design, Université du Quebec à Montreal (UQAM), 18 February – 12 April 2026.
- DOC! Paris, 6–21 June 2025. Kunstraum Bethanian, Berlin, 19 July–5 October 2025.
- Elemental Media Lab, Brown University, Providence, 6 October–15 December 2024.
- The Mosaic Rooms, London, 22 March–16 June 2024.
- gta Exhibitions, ETH Zurich, 6 March–2 April 2024.
- Framer Framed, Amsterdam, If I Can’t Dance, I Don’t Want to be Part of Your Revolution, Biennial, Edition IX: Bodies and Technologies, Amsterdam, 7 October 2023 – 14 January 2024.

Psychocolonial Spaces – Act 1:

- Ar/Ge Kunst, Bolzano, 24 May —2 August 2025.

Housing Pharmacology:

- In Les Grands ensembles curated by Léo Guy-Denarcy, L’Onde Théâtre Centre d’Art, Vélizy-Villacoublay, February 5 – April 8, 2022.
- In Trait d’nion.s, Museum of Marseille History, Manifesta 13 Marseille, curated by Alya Sebti, Katerina Chuchalina and Stefan Kalmar, Marseille, August 28 – November 29, 2020.

Archives: Secret-défense?

- In For the Phoenix to Find its Form in us: On Restitution, Rehabilitation, and Reparation, curated by Bonaventure Soh Bejeng Ndikun, Elena Agudio, Arlette-Louise Ndakoze (SAVVY Contemporary), Nora Razian and Rahul Gudipudi (Jameel Arts Centre), Alya Sebti (ifa Gallery Berlin), SAVVY Contemporary and ifa Gallery Berlin, June 22 – August 29.

Discreet Violence: Architecture and the French War in Algeria:

- The University of Virginia, March 5 – June 3, 2022.
- The Twelve Gates Arts, Philadelphia, September 6 – October 25, 2019.
- AAP Exhibitions, Cornel University, March 7 – April 11, 2019.
- VI PER Gallery, Prague, Czech Republic, September 26 – November 10, 2018.
- ~~La Colonie~~, Paris, France, June 19 – July 14, 2018.
- Graduate School of Architecture, University of Johannesburg, South Africa, April 19– June 2., 2018.
- Archive Kabinett, Berlin, Germany, December 19, 2017 – January 27, 2018.
- The New Institute, Rotterdam, the Netherlands, September 8, 2017 – January 7, 2017/
- gta Exhibitions, ETH Zurich, Switzerland, April 12 – June 3, 2017.

== Awards ==
- 2025 Book Awards (Colonial Toxicity: Rehearsing French Radioactive Architecture and Landscape in the Sahara): The 2024 Most Beautiful Swiss Books by Professional Expert Jury by The Federal Office of Culture (FOC); The 2024 Best Dutch Book Design by Professional Expert Jury; The 2024 Best Dutch Book Design by Students Jury.
- 2024 ETH Golden Owl for excellence in teaching awarded by the Association of Students at ETH Zurich (VSETH).
- 2021–2022 Albert Hirschman Chair for Identity Passions Between Europe and the Mediterranean, the Institute for Advanced Study, the University of Aix-Marseille.
- 2021 Invited Geddes Visiting Fellow, School of Architecture and Landscape Architecture (ESALA), Edinburgh College of Art, the University of Edinburgh.
- 2020 Spiro Kostof Book Award from the Society of Architectural Historians
- 2018 Silver Book Award by the Festival International du Livre d'Art et du Film (FILAF)
- 2018 Best Book Award in Theory of Art by the FILA
- 2017 Best PhD Dissertation, Silver Medal of the ETH Zurich

== See also ==
- Lesley Lokko
- Rosalys Coope
- Martha Levisman
- Simon Pepper (professor)
