= Robert Storr (art academic) =

American art critic and curator (born 1949)

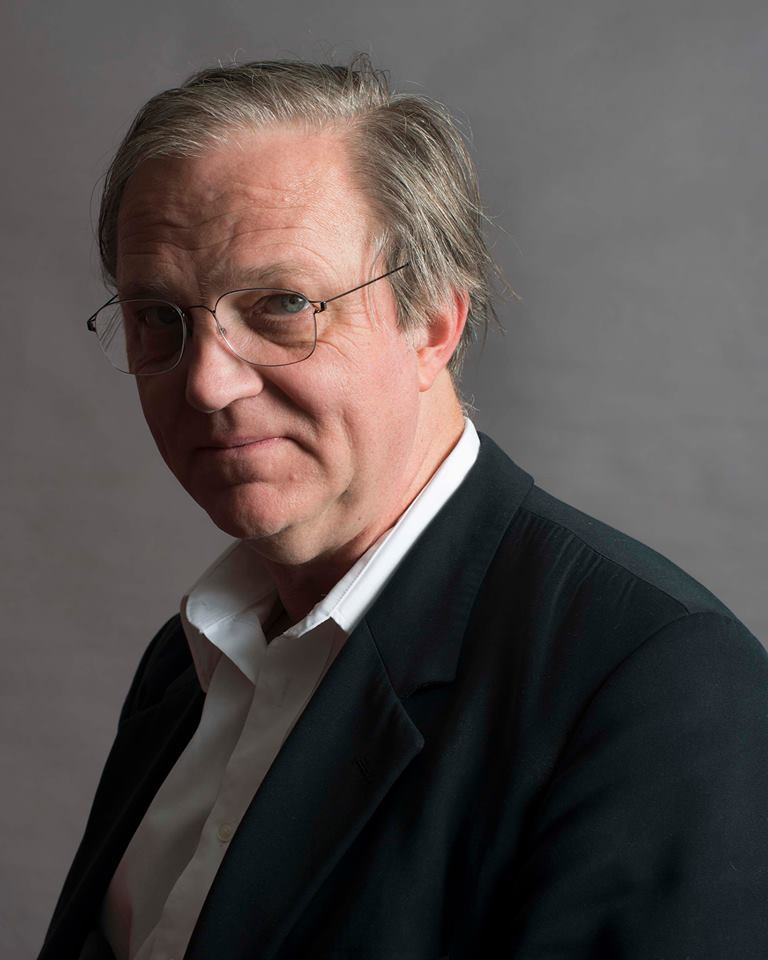
Storr in 2013

Robert Storr (born 1949) is an American curator, critic, painter, and writer.

== Biography ==
Storr received his B.A. in History and French from Swarthmore College in 1972, and earned an M.F.A. in Art from the School of the Art Institute of Chicago in 1978.

== Art and curating career ==
From 1990 to 2002 Robert Storr was curator, then senior curator, in the Department of Painting and Sculpture at the Museum of Modern Art. As a curator, Storr made his mark early with a number of major exhibitions at the museum and elsewhere, which enhanced the public prominence of such artists as Elizabeth Murray, Gerhard Richter, Max Beckmann, Tony Smith and Robert Ryman. He also organized several reinstallations of MoMA's permanent collection, covering such topics as abstraction and the modern grotesque. From 2002 to 2006 he was the first Rosalie Solow Professor of Modern Art at the Institute of Fine Arts, New York University. In 2006, New York magazine listed him as one of the most influential Americans in the art world.

In addition to his curatorial activity, Storr is a practicing artist. In an interview on the occasion of his show at Seattle's Francine Seders Gallery, he said: "I started out as a painter more than 35 years ago, and I've never stopped. I've never become an ex-painter. [...] I certainly know how difficult it is to make art. [...] Making art has made me a better curator. Whether or not being a curator has made me a better artist remains to be seen." His four paintings, titled S.P. #1, 2, 3, and 4, were geometric abstractions featuring horizontal divisions between black and white space with pairs of smaller red dots occupying the white space. The show paired Storr's work with paintings by Denzil Hurley. In December 2022 an exhibition of new paintings by Storr opened at Kingfish Gallery, Buffalo, NY.

Storr has been described as "an artist who's logged enough studio time to have a special regard for painters' painters ... and a gifted writer who can make us appreciate them, too." and a "vital link between the museum world and academia".

Storr has written for Art in America, Artforum, Art Press, Corriere della sera, Frieze, New York Times, Washington Post, Village Voice, The Brooklyn Rail, Art & Design, and Interview. Until April 2011 his regular column 'View from the Bridge' appeared in Frieze magazine.

Storr was the first American to serve as Director of Visual Arts of the Venice Biennale in 2007. He has taught at the CUNY graduate center and the Bard Center for Curatorial Studies as well as the Rhode Island School of Design, Tyler School of Art, New York Studio School and Harvard University, and has been a frequent lecturer in this country and abroad. Storr was reappointed Dean of the Yale School of Art for a second five-year period beginning July 2011. After completing his second term as Dean, Storr continues to teach at the Yale School of Art as a tenured Professor in the Department of Painting/Printmaking.

Storr was succeeded as Dean by Marta Kuzma in 2016.

== Awards and honors ==
Storr has been awarded a Penny McCall Foundation Grant for painting, a Norton Family Foundation Curator Grant, a Guggenheim Fellowship, in 2016, and has been the recipient of honorary doctorates from the School of the Art Institute of Chicago, the Maine College of Art, Swarthmore College, the University of the Arts London, the Nova Scotia College of Art and Design, and Montserrat College of Art.

He also received awards from the American Chapter of the International Association of Art Critics, a special AICA award for Distinguished Contribution to the Field of Art Criticism, an ICI Agnes Gund Curatorial Award, and the Lawrence A. Fleischman Award for Scholarly Excellence in the Field of American Art History from the Smithsonian Institution's Archives of American Art. In June 2017 his book, "Intimate Geometries: The Art and Life of Louise Bourgeois" was awarded the FILAF D'OR at the Festival International du Livre d'Art et du Film, Pergignan, France. In 2000 the French Ministry of Culture presented him with the medal of Chevalier des Arts et des Lettres and in 2010 promoted him to Officier of the same order. Storr is a member of American Abstract Artists.

== Advisory positions ==
Storr serves on the Art Advisory Council of the International Foundation for Art Research (IFAR).

== Selected works ==
A comprehensive bibliography of Storr's published writing from 1980 through April 2020 has been compiled by Francesca Pietropaolo in Robert Storr Writings on Art 1980-2005, Heni Publishing, 2020. Storr's published writings encompass 928 works in 1983 publications in 12 languages and 32,500 library holdings.

- Focal Points: Jasper Johns, edited by Francesca Pietropaolo, Heni Publishing, 2025
- Focal Points: Ad Reinhardt, edited by Francesca Pietropaolo, Heni Publishing, 2024
- Focal Points: Between a Rock and a Hard Place, edited by Francesca Pietropaolo, Heni Publishing, 2024
- Focal Points: Ad Reinhardt, edited by Francesca Pietropaolo, Heni Publishing, 2024
- Focal Points: Bruce Nauman, edited by Francesca Pietropaolo, Heni Publishing, 2024
- Writings on Art 2006-2021, edited and with an introduction by Francesca Pietropaolo, Heni Publishing, 2021
- Crumb's World, essay by Robert Storr, David Zwirner Books, 2021
- Vespers, introductory essay to catalogue of Brian Clarke's Vespers series. Heni Publishing, 2021
- Robert Storr Writings on Art 1980-2005, edited and with an introduction by Francesca Pietropaolo, Heni Publishing, 2020
- Philip Guston: A Life Spent Painting, Laurence King Publishing, 2020
- Robert Storr Interviste sull'arte, edited and with a preface by Francesca Pietropaolo, 2019 (in Italian)
- Nancy Graves: Mapping, Mitchell-Innes & Nash, 2019
- Unfettering Reveries: The Incompiuto Siciliano. In Robert Storr, Marc Auge, Alterazioni Video et al. Incompiuto. The Birth of a Style. Milan: Humboldt Books, 2018
- Robert Storr Interviews on Art, edited and with a preface by Francesca Pietropaolo Heni Publishing, 2017
- Brian Clarke: Night Orchids, interview with the artist, Heni Publishing, 2016
- Intimate Geometries: the Art and Life of Louise Bourgeois, The Monacelli Press, 2016
- How to Look: Ad Reinhardt Art Comics, David Zwirner Books, 2013
- Selections from the private collection of Robert Rauschenberg, Gagosian Gallery, 2012
- In direzione ostinata e contraria: scritti sull'arte contemporanea, edited, introduced and translated by Francesca Pietropaolo 2011
- The Painter's Painter essay in Arshille Gorky: A Retrospective, 2010
- Alice Neel Painted Truths, Yale University Press, 2010
- September: A History Painting by Gerhardt Richter, Tate Publishing, 2009
- Gerhardt Richter: the Cage Paintings, Heni, 2009
- Think with the senses, feel with the mind: art in the present tense, Catalog for the 52nd Biennale di Venezia, Rizzoli, 2007
- Concentration Now Begins... essay in Thomas Nozkowski; Subject to Change, Ludwig Museum, 2007
- As Far as the Eye Can See essay in Rackstraw Downes, Princeton University Press, 2005
- Elizabeth Murray, Museum of Modern Art, 2005
- Popped Art, Museum of Modern Art, 2005
- Touching Down Lightly, 2005
- Disparities & Deformations: Our Grotesque, Exhibition Catalog, The Fifth Annual Santa Fe Biennial, 2004
- Louise Bourgeois, Phaidon, 2003
- Gerhard Richter: Doubt and Belief in Painting, Museum of Modern Art, 2003
- Nancy Spero : The War Series, 1966-1970, Charta, 2003
- Gerhard Richter: Forty Years of Painting, Museum of Modern Art, 2002
- Philip Pearlstein Since 1983, Harry N. Abrams, 2002
- Modern Art Despite Modernism, Museum of Modern Art, 2000
- Gerhard Richter : October 18, 1977, Museum of Modern Art, 2000
- Prince of Tides : Robert Storr talks with Harald Szeemann, 1999
- On the Edge : Contemporary Art from the Werner and Elaine Dannheisser collection, 1998
- Chuck Close, Museum of Modern Art, 1998
- Franz West, 1997
- Bruce Nauman, Museum of Modern Art, 1995
- Between a Rock and a Hard Place, Andy Warhol Foundation for the Visual Arts, 1994
- Mapping, Museum of Modern Art, 1994
- Robert Ryman, Museum of Modern Art, 1993
- Devil on the Stairs: Looking Back on the Eighties, 1991
- Dislocations, Museum of Modern Art, 1991
- Art, censorship and the First Amendment: this is not a test, 1991
- Philip Guston, 1986
- Tilted Arc: Enemy of the People?, 1985
