= Crash Magazine =

French women's magazine

- Editor-in-chief: Armelle Leturcq
- Categories: Fashion magazine
- Frequency: 3 issues a year
- Publisher: Frank Perrin, Armelle Leturcq
- Founded: 1998
- Country: France
- Based in: Paris
- Language: French / English
- Website: www.crash.fr
- ISSN: 1276-4108

Crash Magazine is a French independent magazine published biannually that features articles on women's fashion and cinema.

== History and profile ==
Crash Magazine was founded in 1998 by Frank Perrin and Armelle Leturcq; art critics before publishing Crash, Perrin and Leturcq had previously published an art review known as "Blocnotes". They are both considered part of the new generation of French art critics that left a mark in the 1990s. The magazine is published biannually.

A very stylish magazine.

Jean-Francois Bizot, the founder of Actuel has mentioned that the creation of this publication revolutionized the landscape of French press.

Crash arrived on the French market in 1998 characterized with an element of the unexpected, filled with a deliberate desire to change things: characterized by a minimalist layout and design, it is constituted by challenging avant-garde visuals seeking to emphasize the beauty of things with innovative ideas. Crash worked in close relation with artists such as Air, Daft Punk, Abel Ferrara, Larry Clark, Jared Leto, Michel Gondry during the emergence of the "French Touch". Since 2000, however, they have shifted their focus towards the "New Generation" such as Sofia Coppola, Phoenix and Super Discount.

Crash quickly started to gain the attention of high-end luxury brands such as Chanel and Christian Dior, who looked to revamp their image and attract a younger public, something Crash was able to provide.

Crash Magazine has been considered a platform for rising talent and new artists. This publication focuses on fashion and cinema, espousing the view that fashion represents a cultural phenomenon of society and the social movements that are driven by it in modern times. Crash has been recognized as the only French publication that dares to mix high-end fashion with urban culture, representing the image of a new generation of consumers that has recently emerged.

Crash enjoys a circulation of 80,000, also publishing an English version sold internationally. The average reader (20–45 years old) sees Crash as a reference point that explores the fresh and upcoming trends, styles, culture and lifestyle.
