= Line Ouellet =

Canadian art historian and museum administrator

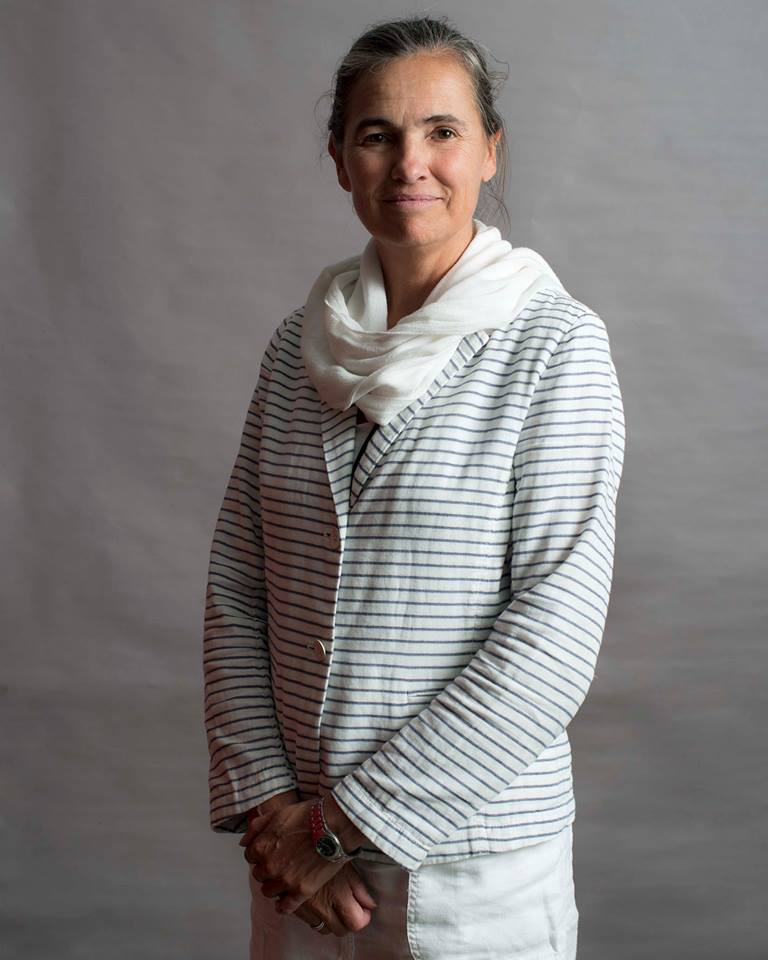
Line Ouellet

Line Ouellet (born 1958) is a Canadian art historian and museum administrator. She is the Director-General and Head of Conservation at Quebec's Museum of Fine Arts. She has also been the president of the provincial government's Council of Cultural Heritage of Quebec since 2018. In 2010, she was made a Knight of the Order of Arts and Letters by the French government for services to arts and letters.

== Early life and education ==
Ouellet obtained a Bachelor of Arts degree in history in 1980 from the University of Laval and a Master of Arts degree in history in 1984 also from the University of Laval. In 1983, she also obtained a diploma in the English language from the University of Cambridge.

== Career ==
Ouellet began working as an assistant editor of Continuity (Continuité) magazine in 1984 before she became the editor-in-chief in 1985.

She left to work at Quebec City's Museum of Civilisation in 1988 as project manager of special exhibitions. In 1993, she became the director of special exhibitions and, in 1999, she became the museum's director of education.

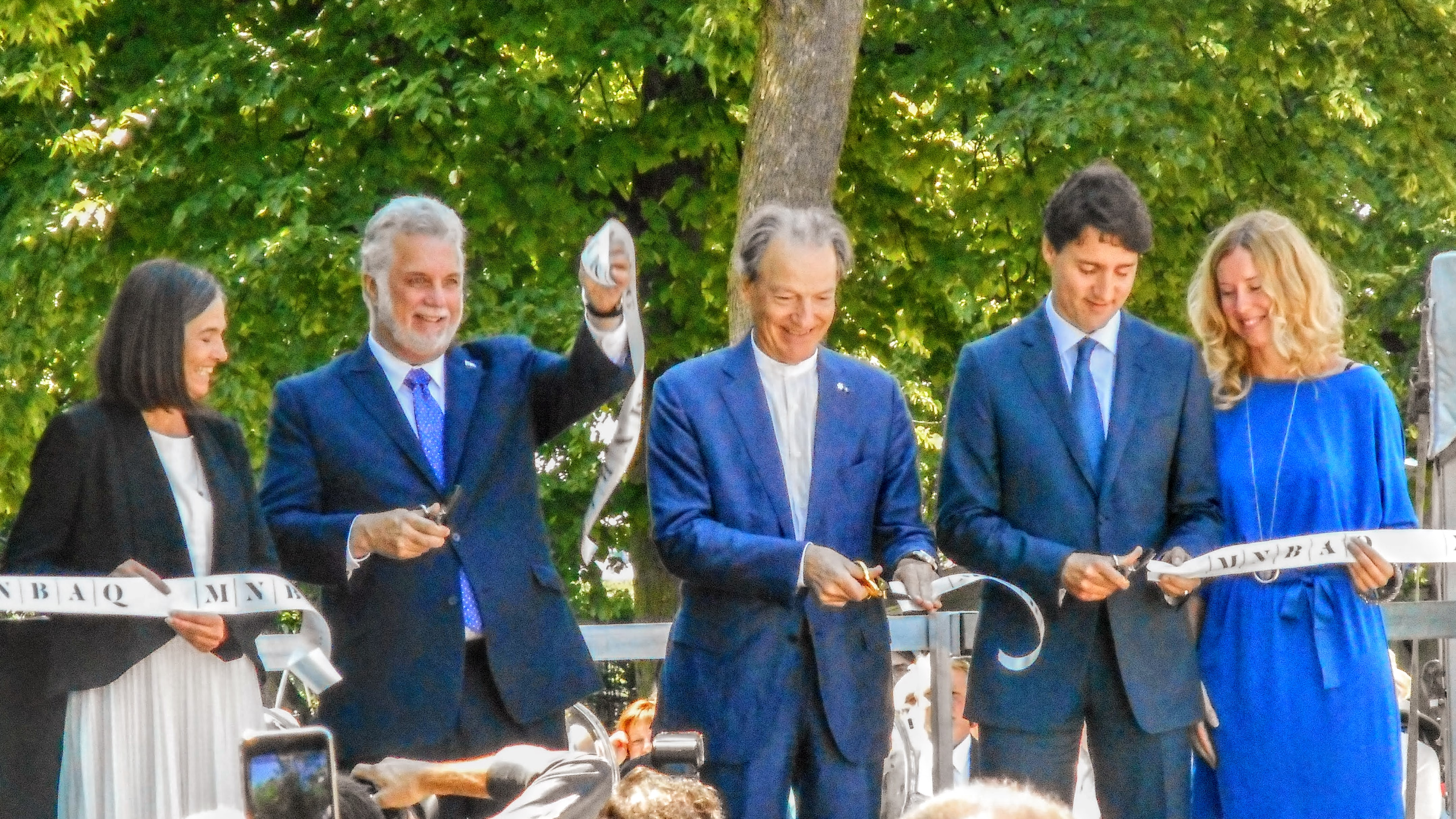
Official Inauguration of the Pierre-Lassonde Pavilion

In 1999, Ouellet left to take up the job of director of exhibitions at the Musée National des Beaux Arts (Museum of Fine Arts). From 2000 to 2006, she served as director of exhibitions and director of education. From 2006, she served as director of exhibitions and director of scientific publications. In April 2011, Ouellet became interim director-general. In October, she was formally appointed director-general and head of conservation.

Ouellet also served as a member of the jury of the International Festival of Art Books and Film at Perpignan, France in June 2013.

She has been the president of the Quebec government's Council of Cultural Heritage (Conseil du patrimoine culturel du Québec) since 2018. In 2023, her term was renewed for another five years.

== Awards and honours ==
In 2005, Ouellet received the Canadian Museums Association's Award for Excellence for the publication "Camille Claudel and Rodin: The Meeting of Two Destinies" (2005). The same year, she also received the Quebec Museums Society's Publication Award for "Exhibition Design: Ten Exhibition Designs at the Musée national des beaux-arts du Québec" (2003).

In 2009, she was awarded the Quebec Museums Society's Award for Excellence for the exhibition "The Louvre in Quebec City".

In 2010, she was made a Knight of the Order of Arts and Letters, from the French government for services to arts and letters and noted in particular for her collaboration and links with French museums.
