= Benin Dialogue Group =

International working group for restitution of cultural heritage to Nigeria

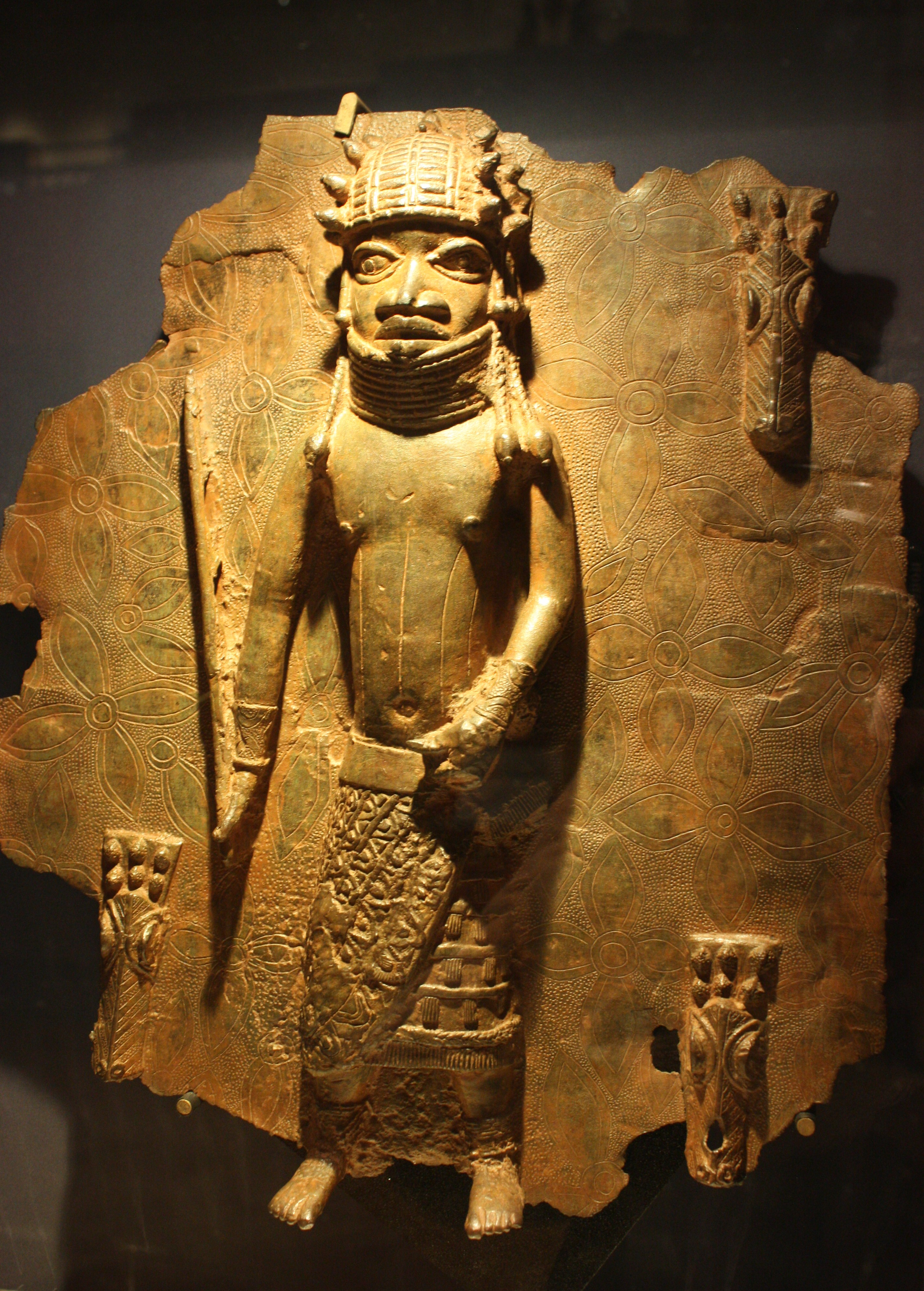
Bronze plate representing the traditional ruler Oba Orhogbua, 1550-1578 CE of the Edo people in Nigeria, currently in Horniman Museum, United Kingdom

The Benin Dialogue Group is a multi-lateral international collaborative working group that brings together delegates from Western museums with representatives of the Nigerian Government, the Royal Court of Benin, and the Nigerian National Commission for Museums and Monuments. Its aims are cooperation between museums possessing Nigerian cultural heritage and the creation of a permanent display in Benin City, in particular the Benin Bronzes.

== Aims and results of the cooperation ==
The aim of the group is "to work together to establish a museum in Benin City that will facilitate a permanent display [for] reuniting Benin works of art dispersed in collections around the world." The group was formed in 2007 and is one of the central bodies for discussion on the restitution of cultural objects looted from Benin City as part of the punitive expedition by the British Army in 1897, which resulted in the destruction and dispersal of the ancient civilisation of that city. The group's discussions have focused on rotating long-term loans by some Western members, while Nigerian members have demanded returns. Hamburg museum director Barbara Plankensteiner has stressed that the group has no competence to decide on any returns, which are legal responsibilities of the different organizations governing the group's members. Further, the cooperation has resulted in a proposal by Ghanaian-British architect Sir David Adjaye to design a new museum in Benin City.

Consortium members include Edo State Government, Royal Court of Benin, Nigerian National Commission for Museums and Monuments, Abuja, Museum of Ethnology, Vienna, Ethnological Museum of the State Museums of Berlin, Museum am Rothenbaum (MARKK) of Hamburg, Staatliche Kunstsammlungen Dresden, Dresden Museum of Ethnology and Leipzig Museum of Ethnology, Linden Museum of Stuttgart, Nationaal Museum van Wereldculturen of The Netherlands, Museum of World Culture in Stockholm, Museum of Archaeology and Anthropology of the University of Cambridge, British Museum and Pitt Rivers Museum of the University of Oxford.

Following the French Report on the restitution of African cultural heritage in 2018, there has been a greater focus on returning ownership to Nigeria, rather than loans, and has led to returns by the University of Aberdeen in Scotland and Jesus College, Cambridge, in October 2021. In November 2021, the Metropolitan Museum of Art (MET) returned two brass plaques from its collection to the Nigerian National Commission for Museums and Monuments (NNCMM) and signed a memorandum of understanding on further cooperation. This was accomplished after procedures relating to the authority to return such cultural items had resulted in definitive legal agreements between the owners and Nigerian collections. Thus, some members of the Benin Dialogue Group, such as the Museum of Archaeology and Anthropology of the University of Cambridge and notably the Ethnological Museum of Berlin and other collections in Germany have agreed to return large numbers of Benin Bronzes. In return, the Nigerian authorities accepted to leave some pieces on long-term loans in Western collections.

In March 2021, the achievements of the group had been criticised by Yusuf Tuggar, Nigeria's ambassador to Germany, who told Deutsche Welle that the dialogue "has been going on for so long now and nothing has happened and it seems to be gravitating more towards loans and which is totally unacceptable at the Nigerian side."

== Digital Benin online platform ==
In November 2022, ARTnews magazine reported that the Digital Benin online database had been created by a number of museums, including both experts from Nigeria (National Museum Lagos and Benin City National Museum) as well as from other African and Western institutions. Digital Benin lists 131 institutions from 20 countries with Benin cultural heritage in their collections. This new online platform allows visitors to learn about the specifications, location and provenance of more than 5,000 African artefacts, including maps, high-resolution images, and the title of the works in English and Edo languages.

== See also ==
- Benin Bronzes
- Report on the restitution of African cultural heritage
- African art in Western collections
- Restitution (law)
- Repatriation (cultural property)
