= Barbara Plankensteiner =

Ethnologist and museum director

Barbara Plankensteiner (born 1963 in Bolzano, South Tyrol, Italy) is an Italian ethnologist and museum director. She was appointed scientific director of the Hamburg ethnological Museum am Rothenbaum in April 2017. As spokesperson for the Benin Dialogue Group, she was commissioned in 2021 to coordinate the restitution of Benin Bronzes in German museums.

== Career ==
After studying ethnology and philosophy at the University of Vienna, Plankensteiner graduated with her PhD in 2002 from the Institute for Cultural and Social Anthropology, Institute of African Studies. From 1998 to 2015 she worked at the Weltmuseum Wien (until 2013 called Museum of Ethnology), most recently as deputy director and chief curator and head of the sub-Saharan Africa department. She cowrote African Lace: A History of Trade, Creativity and Fashion in Nigeria with Nath Mayo Adediran in 2010. From October 22, 2010 to February 14, 2011 the Museum of Ethnology showed the exhibition African Lace: A History of Trade, Creativity and Fashion in Nigeria some of which have been produced in Austria (Vorarlberg ) and Switzerland since the 1960s.

Plankensteiner was appointed Senior Curator at the Yale University Art Gallery in 2015. In April 2017, she took over from Wulf-Dietrich Köpke as scientific director of the Museum für Völkerkunde in Hamburg, which was renamed Museum am Rothenbaum – Cultures and Arts of the World (MARKK) in 2018.

In 2018, Plankensteiner co-founded and is also the spokesperson of Benin Dialogue Group, which advocates for the establishment of a museum in Benin City, Nigeria, to house the works of art from the former Kingdom of Benin that are now scattered around the world. Following the decision by German museum experts to return the Benin Bronzes in April 2021, Plankensteiner, together with the President of the Prussian Cultural Heritage Foundation, Hermann Parzinger, was commissioned to coordinate the actions of the 20 affected German museums.
