= Abdelkader Benchamma =

French artist

Abdelkader Benchamma (born 1975) is a French artist who lives and works in Montpellier.

== Early life ==
Benchamma was born in 1975 in France to Algerian parents. He completed his studies at the École Supérieure des Beaux Arts de Paris in 2003.

== Artistic Practice ==
In 2011, Benchamma participated in the Future of a Promise exhibition for Arab artists which took place on Zaterre at the same time as the Venice Biennale. He was commissioned for the Told Untold Retold exhibition at the Mathaf Museum, Doha, Qatar. In July 2012 he had a solo exhibition of ultra-detailed pen drawings, Corrupted Theories, at the Gallery Isabelle van den Eynde, Dubai.

Benchamma creates delicately executed drawings of states of matter, events and explosions animated by a wide range of dynamics. He is strongly influenced by theories of astrophysics and cosmology, as well as existentialist theatre and literary investigations.

Benchamma explores natural and primordial forms of matter. In his series of ‘Sculpture’ drawings, the monolithic forms and piles develop organically on the page. Suggestions of organic and mineral forms emerge in the fluid patterns, recalling the strength of mountain landscapes or planes of greenery. For the series, Benchamma restricted himself to using only black marker pens, coloring in varying shades of black.

While Benchamma’s central focus is drawing, he develops ideas into sculpture, furthering his conceptual questioning of reality. In ‘Sculpture, More or Less’, a wooden parquet floor breaks with all the material properties of a sheet of glass, shattering in a way that the viewer only notices when standing up close to the work. The technical behavior of the natural materials, wood and glass, are manipulated and decontextualized to create a surreal and spectacular illusion.

He has had solo exhibitions across Europe as well as in Asia, and has works in public collections, namely the FRAC Languedoc-Roussillon, the Musee de Beaux Arts-Orleans, and Artotheque de Pessac in France.
