= Frank Perrin =

French photographer and critic (born 20th century

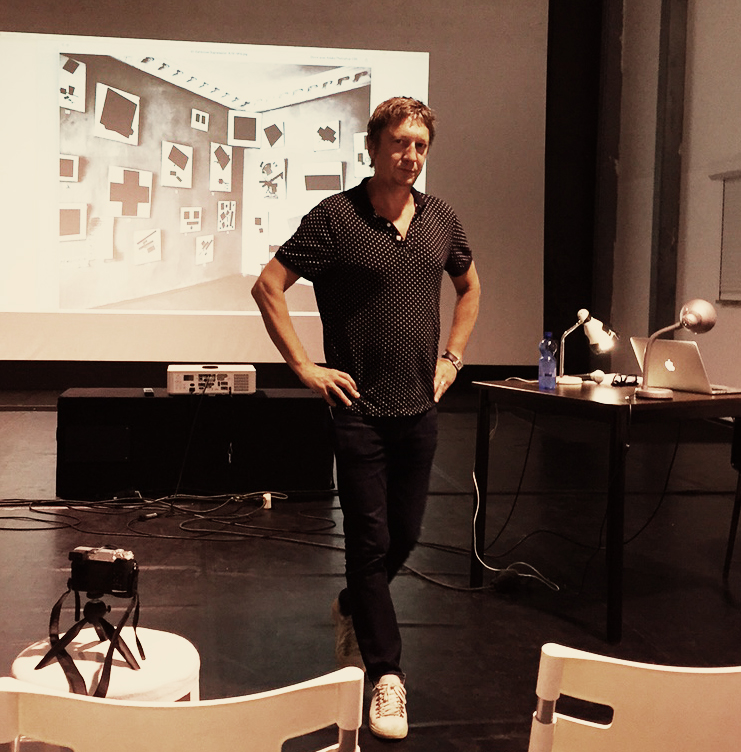
- Frank Perrin
- Year of Birth: 1969
- Nationality: French

Frank Perrin (born 1969) is a French male photographer and critic, based in Paris.

== Career ==
Perrin has spent the last ten years exploring the notion of post-capitalism and compiling a compendium of contemporary obsessions. Post-Capitalism is a project flip-book of the fundamental ideas of the current era, from joggers and yachts to fashion shows, where each photograph aims to be a new landscape of the unconscious and desires of modern society.

Perrin was formerly a philosophy teacher and an art critic. He started the photographic series of joggers in 1998 and fashion shows in 2003. After founding the art review Bloc Notes in the early 1990s, he began taking photographs. He is also the founding director of Crash Magazine.

Perrin's work has been featured at the Daelim Contemporary Art Museum, Seoul, South Korea; at the Les Abattoirs, Musée – Frac Occitanie Toulouse , Toulouse, France; the Centre Pompidou-Metz, Metz, France; and the Shirn Kunsthalle, Frankfurt, Germany.
