= Morgane Tschiember =

French artist

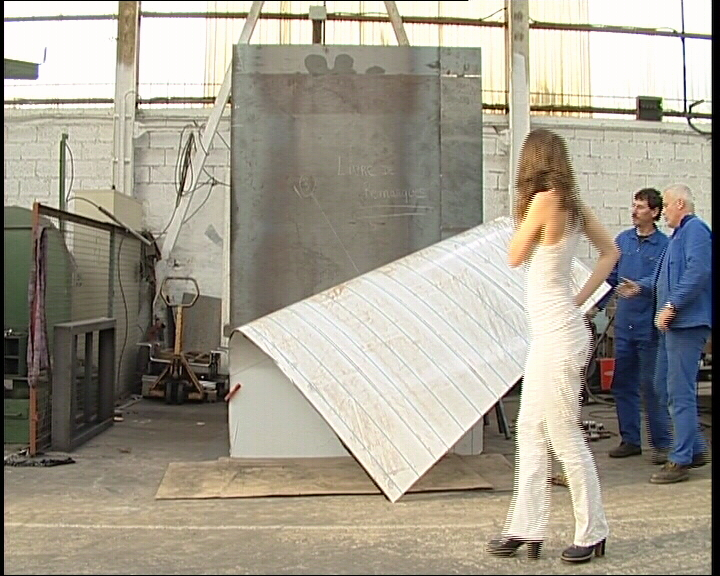
- Born: 1976 (age 49–50); Brest, France
- Known for: Sculpture Installation Video Photography

Morgane Tschiember is a French artist. She was born in Brest, France in 1976 and currently lives and works in Paris, France.

== Biography ==
She graduated from DNSAP from ENSBA in Paris (National School of Fine Arts) in 2002 and DNSEP (National School of Artistic Expression) in Quimper in 1999.

The winner of the Espace Paul Ricard Prize in 2001, occasionally working with Olivier Mosset, Morgane Tschiember has participated in over 60 solo and group shows throughout the world (France, Austria, Belgium, Britain, Czech Republic, Germany, Italy, Serbia, Japan, Switzerland and the United States).

== Work ==
Morgane Tschiember has directed her work from two- to three-dimensional pieces, in order to explore the transitions between dimensions, and how they relate to each other. Thus her sculptures are sometimes colorful, in order to make color a pure original material to be shaped, and therefore open a connection between painting and sculpture.

She views sculpting also as a way to investigate the relationship between the objects and the places in such a way that the spectator gets a more complete esthetic experience.

She considers her work as "classic" in the sense that it deals with fundamental elements such as form, color, material, which are treated by artists throughout art history. She also explores the new possibilities of painting and making sculptures, and is interested in the way the meaning "shifts" both in the spectator's eyes and because in her view, reality can not reside in one single interpretation).

As a result, her aim is to create sculptures that not only stand in three dimensions, but include others such as time, action, movement, flux or fluids, opening up the place a piece takes and how it relates to where it stands.

== Solo exhibitions (selection) ==
2010
Morgane Tschiember, Fondation d'entreprise Ricard, Paris, France
Morgane Tschiember, Gallery Loevenbruck, Paris, France
Solid Geometry, Super Window Project, Art Fair Tokyo, Tokyo, Japan
Folding Space, Super Window Project, Kyoto, Japan
The Shortest Way to Sleepness, Audio Visual Arts, New York, USA
2009
Morgane Tschiember, Gallery Lange & Pult, Zurich, Switzerland
The Sound of Paradise, Gallery Sollertis, Toulouse, France
2007
Iron Maiden, Galerie Loevenbruck, Paris, France
Running Bond, Galerie French Made, Munich, Germany
Dohromady, Project Room, Galerie Monika Burian, Prague, Czechoslovakia
2005
Project Room, Catherine Bastide Gallery, Brussels, Belgium
Melanie Korn Gallery, Munich, Germany
One Man Show, Art Dealers Marseille, Vanessa Quang Gallery, SEAD Galerie, Antwerp, Belgium
2004
French Made Gallery, Munich, Germany
2003
Chair(s) Project, in 10 butcher shops, France
2002
Paul Ricard, Espace Paul Ricard, Paris, France
Blasons, 4 x 3 Billsticking, Paris, France
