= Nath Mayo Adediran =

Nigerian museum director

Nath Mayo Adediran is a Nigerian museum director. He is the former Director of Museums at the National Commission for Museums and Monuments.

== Education ==
Adediran was a recipient of Scholarship and Bursary Awards under the Federal Military Government Scholarships Programme for 1973-74 to study botany. He graduated from University of Ibadan in 1975 with a degree in botany. In 1988, he obtained a masters degree in botany from the University of Lagos.

== Career ==
Adediran is the pioneer curator of National Museum Osogbo which began the Osun-Osogbo. Adediran was elected as Secretary of the International Committee for Museums and Collections of Natural History board at the International Council of Museums for the period 2004–2007.

He cowrote African Lace: A History of Trade, Creativity and Fashion in Nigeria with Barbara Plankensteiner in 2010. He and Barbara Plankensteiner curated African Lace as an exhibition at the Ethnographic Museum at the University of Zurich in the same year. Adediran's work was also referenced in Suzanne Blier's article; Art in Ancient Ife, Birthplace of the Yoruba, published by Harvard University.

He was the president of the International Council of African Museums (AFRICOM) in 2012.

In 2013, he was on the steering committee of the US-Africa Cultural Heritage Strategic Partnership at Michigan State University Museum. Adediran was one of the curators of Central Bank of Nigeria's Currency Museum established in 2023.
