= Martha Levisman =

Argentine architect, archivist, and historian (1933–2022)

Martha Levisman de Clusellas
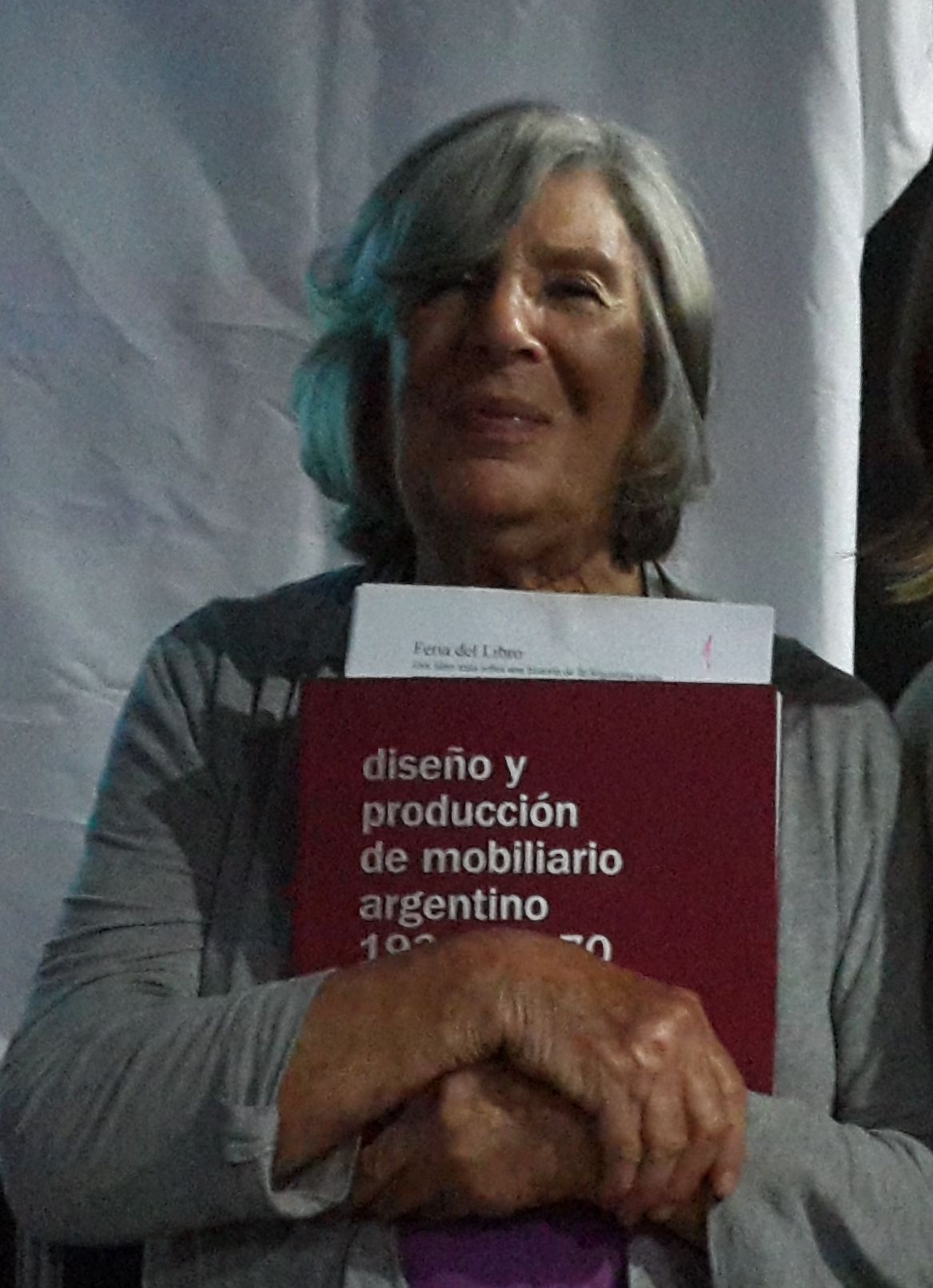
- Born: August 18, 1933
- Died: June 13, 2022 (aged 88)
- Education: University of Buenos Aires
- Occupations: Architect, archivist, historian

Martha Levisman de Clusellas (18 August 1933 – 13 June 2022) was an Argentine architect, archivist, and historian. She was best known for the three buildings of the Antorchas Foundation in Buenos Aires and for the part she played in the development of the National Library in Buenos Aires. In 1985 she completed the first Antorchas building. Writer Roberto Segren notes how in her work on the first Antorchas building transformed a "decayed palace representative of the anonymous architecture of Italian builders of the late nineteenth century" in the San Telmo neighborhood.

== Biography ==
From 1952 to 1958, she studied at the Faculty of Architecture and Urbanism at the University of Buenos Aires, together with Beatriz Goldestein, Nely Cueitel and Nora Monreal. It was during the period of transition when some of the staff were teaching the Beaux Arts style while others were beginning to turn to Modernism, especially César Janello and Tomás Maldonado who taught integral design. She was also able to benefit from the lectures given by Odilia Suárez and Enriqueta Méoli, both bent on following emerging trends.

She was on the point of leaving Buenos Aires to embark on further studies in Rosario where there was a new school of architecture but she stayed in the capital after meeting Gerardo Clusellas (1929–73) who became her business partner, her husband and the father of her three sons. From 1957, she began her career at the university, working under Janello and with Wladimiro Acosta. From 1963 to 1966, she headed first-year practical projects in Alfredo Ibarlucía's department. Later she worked with Mario Tempone. With the return of democracy in 1984, she returned to the Faculty of Architecture at Buenos Aires University as lecturer responsible for cultural events until 1989 when she worked for the dean, undertaking research and arranging historical exhibitions.

Between 1998 and 2002, Levisman was director of ARCA, Argentina's architectural archive centre (Asociación Civil para el Archivo de Arquitectura Contemporánea Argentina); she also served as ARCA's president. As an archivist she has worked for the Bustillo family. Levisman has conducted research as a historian into architecture, in one instance arguing that the "Bariloche style" was "created by a group of affluent Argentine developers inspired by 'colonization, illusion and fantasy'".

As an architect, she was a member of her husband's firm. The most important completed works included the Antorchas Head Office (1985), the TAREA Foundation building (renovated in 1987) and an addition to the Antorchas complex to house a photograph gallery, completed in 1991. In 1989, she was commissioned to complete work on the National Library, a sizeable project which entailed redrafting plans for the interiors which had originally been mislaid.

== Bibliography ==
- Hispanic Institute in the United States (2009). Revista hispánica moderna. Casa de las Españas, Columbia University.
- Segre, Roberto (1991). América Latina fim de milênio: raízes e perspectivas de sua arquitetura. Studio Nobel. ISBN 978-85-85445-01-0.
- Sierra, Marta (8 May 2012). Gendered Spaces in Argentine Women's Literature. Palgrave Macmillan. p. 7. ISBN 978-1-137-26085-7.
