= Rosalys Coope =

- Born: Rosalys T Torr; 1921; Steyning
- Died: 2018 (aged 96–97)
- Occupation: Architectural Historian
- Spouse: Peter Coope

Academic background
- Education: The Courtauld Institute of Art
- Thesis: Salomon de Brosse and the Development of the French Style of architecture 1565-1630
- Doctoral advisor: Anthony Blunt

Academic work
- Discipline: Architectural History

Rosalys Coope (1921–2018) was a much respected architectural historian. As well as an academic and researcher she served in the Women's Royal Naval Service during World War II.

== Biography ==
=== Early life and education ===
Rosalys T Torr was born in 1921; the birth registered in Steyning, Sussex. Her mother died when Rosalys was ten months old.

Torr's education in the 1930s took place in Switzerland and Italy. In 1938, as war threatened and with Mussolini in power in Italy, she resided in Florence at a house sheltering Jewish people trying to flee the country. At the height of the Munich Crisis in that same year Torr was in Paris eventually making her way home to comparative safety. Torr joined the Women's Royal Naval Service. She served in Ceylon (now Sri Lanka) in 1944 and attained the rank of Acting 3rd Officer.

After the war ended Torr became an undergraduate of the Courtauld Institute of Art, London, under the tutelage of Margaret Whinney. It was in London that she met and married Peter Coope (1919–2005) in 1951 in Chelsea. The couple moved to Epperstone in Nottinghamshire in the same year. They had two daughters, Clare and Helena.

== Working life ==
=== London ===
After the war and before her marriage Torr worked as assistant to Sir Kenneth Clark for two years. Sir Kenneth had been appointed Slade Professor of Fine Art at the University of Oxford in 1946 for a term of three years. He was also a member of various important committees during this period.

=== Nottingham ===
Her marriage to Peter Coope, a Chartered Accountant, was followed by the move to Epperstone, where her husband joined his father's accountancy practice. Following the birth of their two children, Coope took up her research interests joining the Bromley House Library and becoming a member of the Council of the Thoroton Society in 1955 and its president from 2008 to 2014.

Over the ensuing years Coope remained an active researcher and author in her field with a number of publications to her name. Her works included articles for the journal 'Architectural History'.

Her interest in and enthusiasm for research culminated in her registering for a PhD, at the Courtauld Institute of Art, which was subsequently awarded in 1972. Her tutor was Anthony Blunt and their interests coincided not least with Coope's fluency in French. The subject of her dissertation was the French architect Salomon de Brosse (1565–1630).

== Legacy ==
As well as her published works, Coope became part of the fabric of intellectual life in Nottingham as her various obituaries attest.

Photographs attributed to Coope are held in the Conway Library collection of images at the Courtauld Institute of Art. This physical collection of glass and film negatives as well as photographic prints is in the process of being digitised as part of a wider project 'Courtauld Connects'.

== Recognition ==
In 1961 Coope was elected as Fellow of the Society of Antiquaries (FSA). An obituary notes that Coope was part of a group of young women scholars elected to the Society and that her life exemplified scholarly achievement in art and architectural history.

== Publications ==
- Salomon de Brasse and the Development of the Classical Style in French Architecture 1565–1630, (1972) Zwemmer, London.
- Newstead Abbey;: A Nottinghamshire Country Manor, Its Owners and Architectural History 1540–1931, (2014) The Thoroton Society of Nottinghamshire.
- Bromley House 1752-1991: Four Essays Celebrating the 175th Anniversary of the Foundation of the Nottingham Subscription Library (1991) Nottingham Subscription Library, Nottingham.
- Catalogue of the Drawings of the Royal Institutes of British Architects: Jacques Gentilhatre (1972) Farnborough Gregg, Farnborough.
- The Chateau of Montceau-en-Brie (1959) The Warburg and Courtauld Institutes, London.
- Lord Byron's Newstead: The Abbey and its Furnishings during the Poet's Ownership 1798–1817, (publishing date not known).
- The Long Gallery: Its Origins, Development, Use and Decoration (1986) Architectural History, Vol 29 (1986), pp43–72&74-84.
