= Simon Pepper (professor) =

Architectural and military historian

Simon Mark Pepper is a British historian who is emeritus professor of architecture at the University of Liverpool. He is a specialist in late medieval and early modern military architecture.

== Career ==
Pepper is professor of architecture at the University of Liverpool. He is a member of the Royal Institute of British Architects. He is a specialist in late medieval and early modern military architecture and has been on the editorial board of Fort: The International Journal of Military Architecture since 1997. Pepper is a fellow of the Royal Society of Arts.

== Selected publications ==
- Firearms and fortifications: Military architecture and siege warfare in Sixteenth Century Siena. University of Chicago Press, 1986. (With Nicholas Adams) ISBN 0226655342
- "Sword and spade: Military construction in renaissance Italy", in Construction History, 16, 2000. pp. 13–22. ISSN 0267-7768
- Books, buildings and social engineering: Early public libraries in Britain from past to present. Ashgate, 2009. (With Alistair Black and Kaye Bagshaw) ISBN 978-0415186049
- "Warfare and Operational Art: Communications, Cannon and Small War" in Tallett, Frank and Trim, David, eds. European Warfare 1350-1750. Cambridge University Press, Cambridge, 2010. pp. 181–202.
