= Druten =

- Municipality
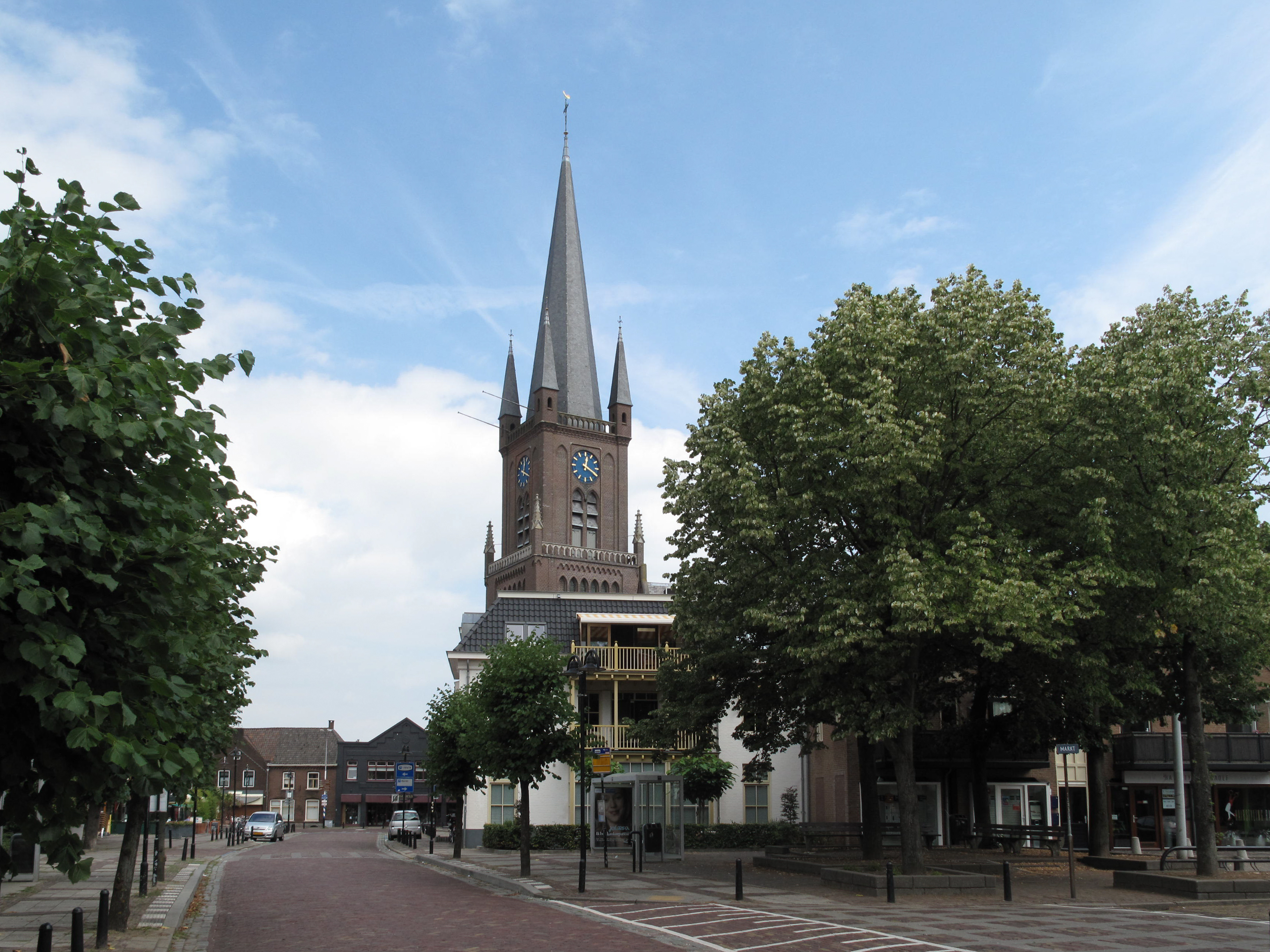
- Church in Druten

- Flag Coat of arms

- Location in Gelderland
- Coordinates: 51°53′N 5°36′E
- Country: Netherlands
- Province: Gelderland

Government
  - Body: Municipal council
  - Mayor: Sigrid Sengers (VVD)

Area
  - Total: 42.46 km^{2} (16.39 sq mi)
  - Land: 37.64 km^{2} (14.53 sq mi)
  - Water: 4.82 km^{2} (1.86 sq mi)
- Elevation: 7 m (23 ft)

Population (2026)
  - Total: 20.019
  - Density: 505/km^{2} (1,310/sq mi)
- Time zone: UTC+1 (CET)
  - Summer (DST): UTC+2 (CEST)
- Postcode: 6630–6631, 6650–6655
- Area code: 0487
- Website: www.druten.nl

Druten (Dutch pronunciation: [ˈdrytə(n)]) is a municipality and a town in the eastern Netherlands. The municipality covers the eastern part of the Land van Maas en Waal region of the province of Gelderland.

One of its key features is the town's church, designed by architect Pierre Cuypers. The church is dedicated to the Two Ewalds, with statues for the two made in the studio Atelier Cuypers-Stoltzenberg, owned by Cuypers and Frans Stoltzenberg.

== Population centres ==
- Afferden
- Deest
- Druten
- Horssen
- Molenhoek
- Puiflijk

=== Topography ===
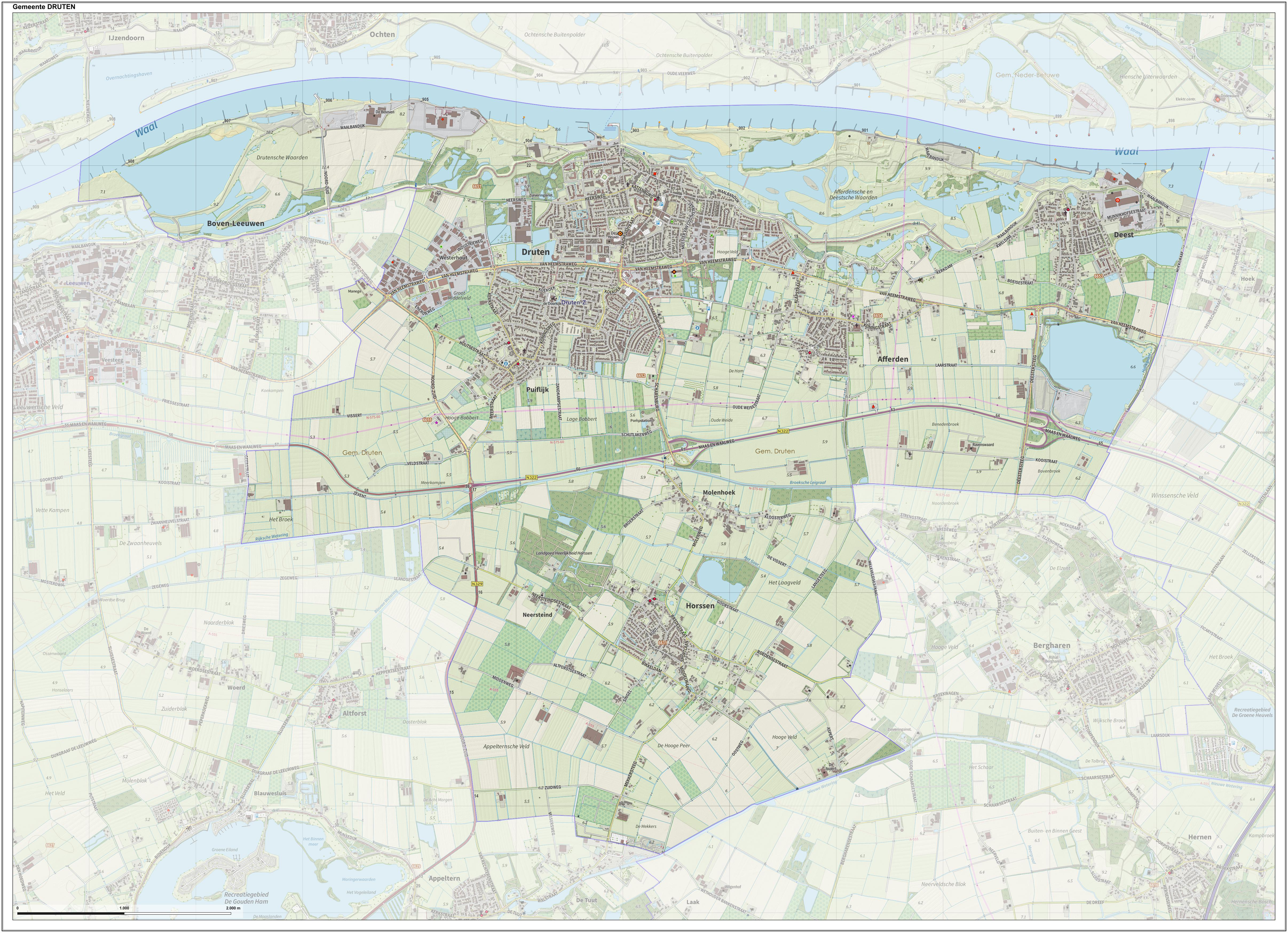

Dutch topographic map of the municipality of Druten, June 2015

== Notable residents ==
- Reginald Wolfe (died 1573) a Dutch-born English Protestant printer, an original member of the Royal Stationers' Company
- Josef van Schaik (1882–1962) & Steef van Schaik (1888–1968) Dutch politician and brothers
- Ru Paré (1896–1972), a Dutch resistance member, and visual artist
- Peter Hans Kolvenbach (1928–2016), the twenty-ninth Superior General of the Society of Jesus
- Pieter Roelofs (1972), art historian
- Jasmijn Lau (1999-) Dutch athlete, long-distance runner

== Gallery ==
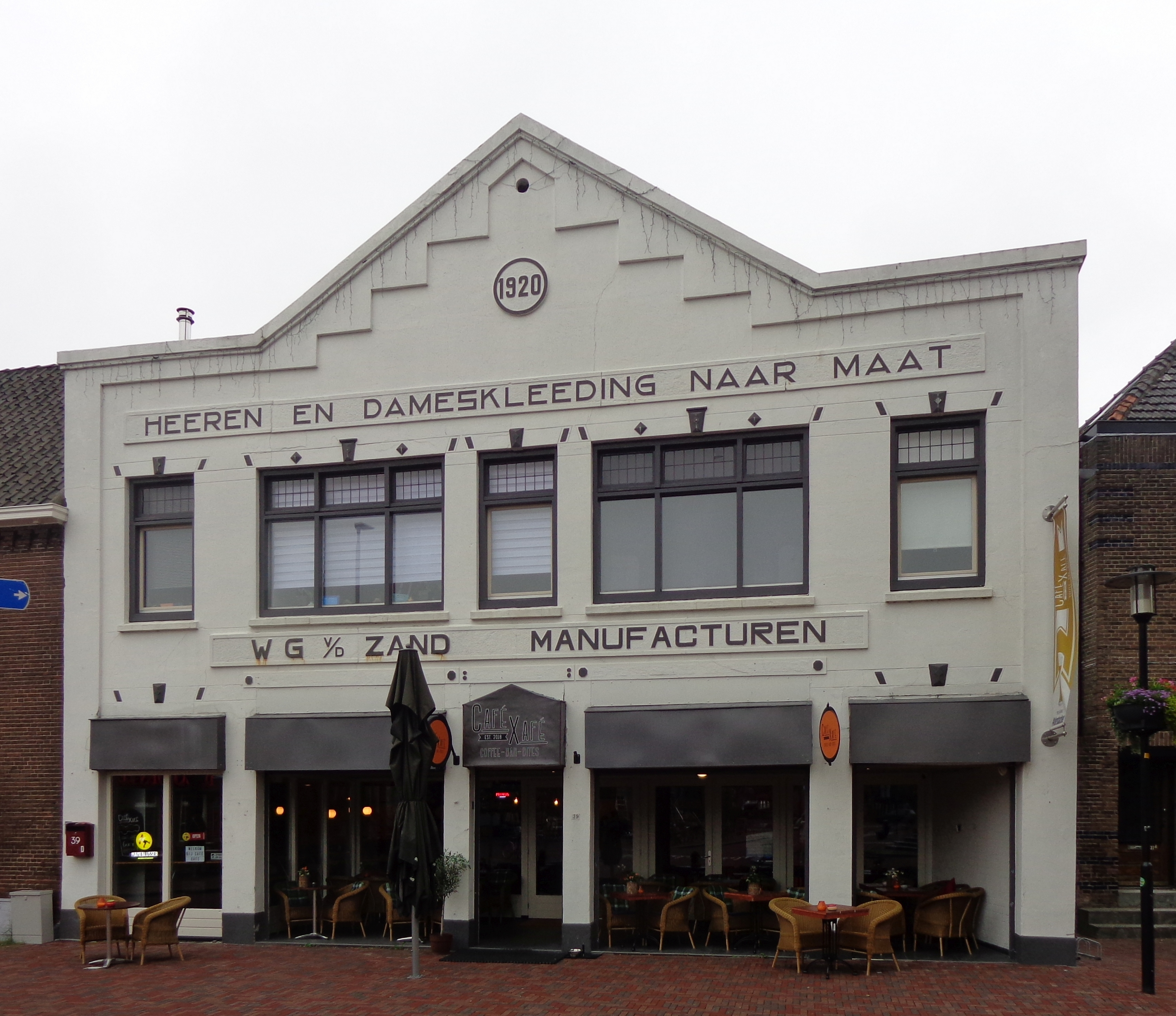
Druten Kattenburg 39

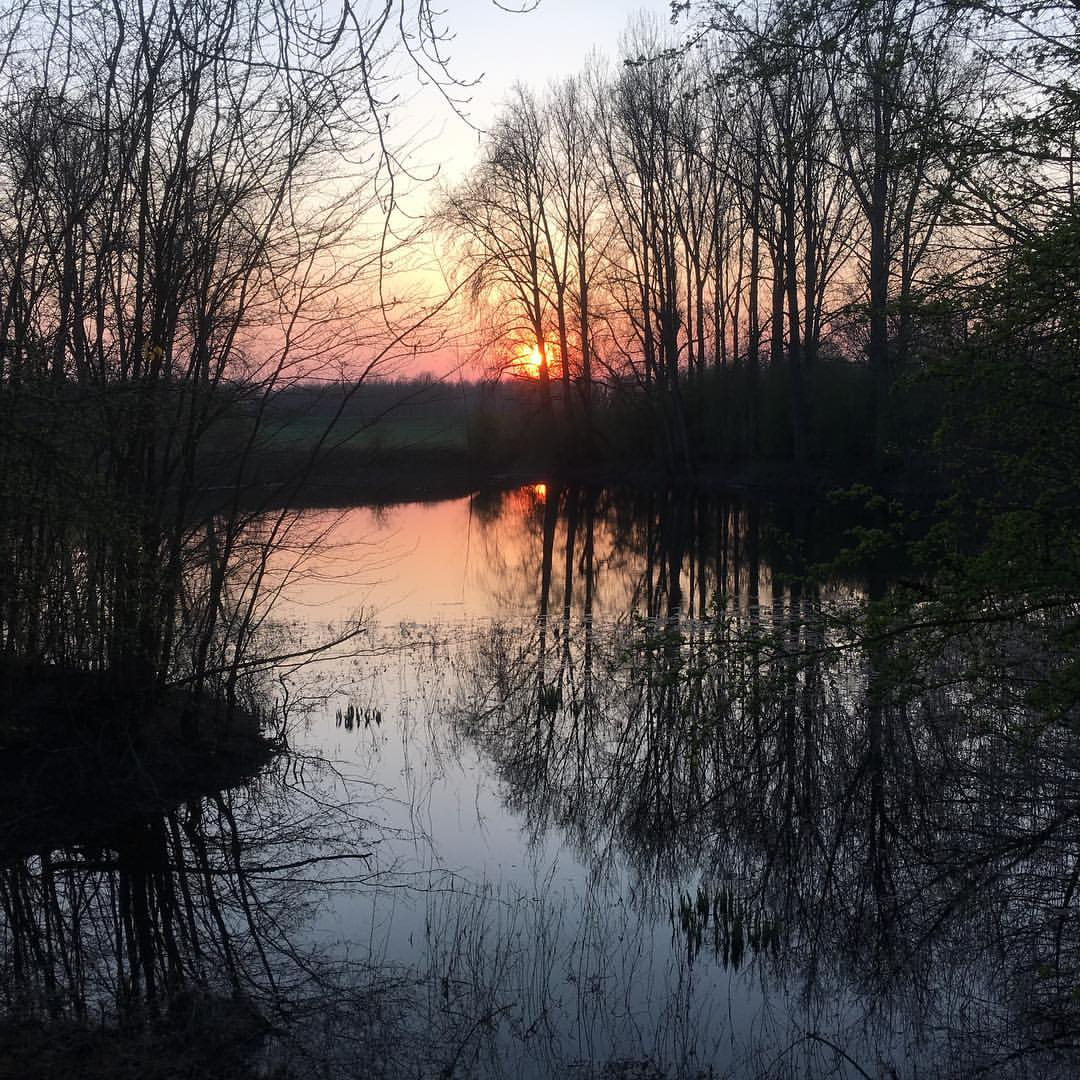
Avondrood in Maas & Waal

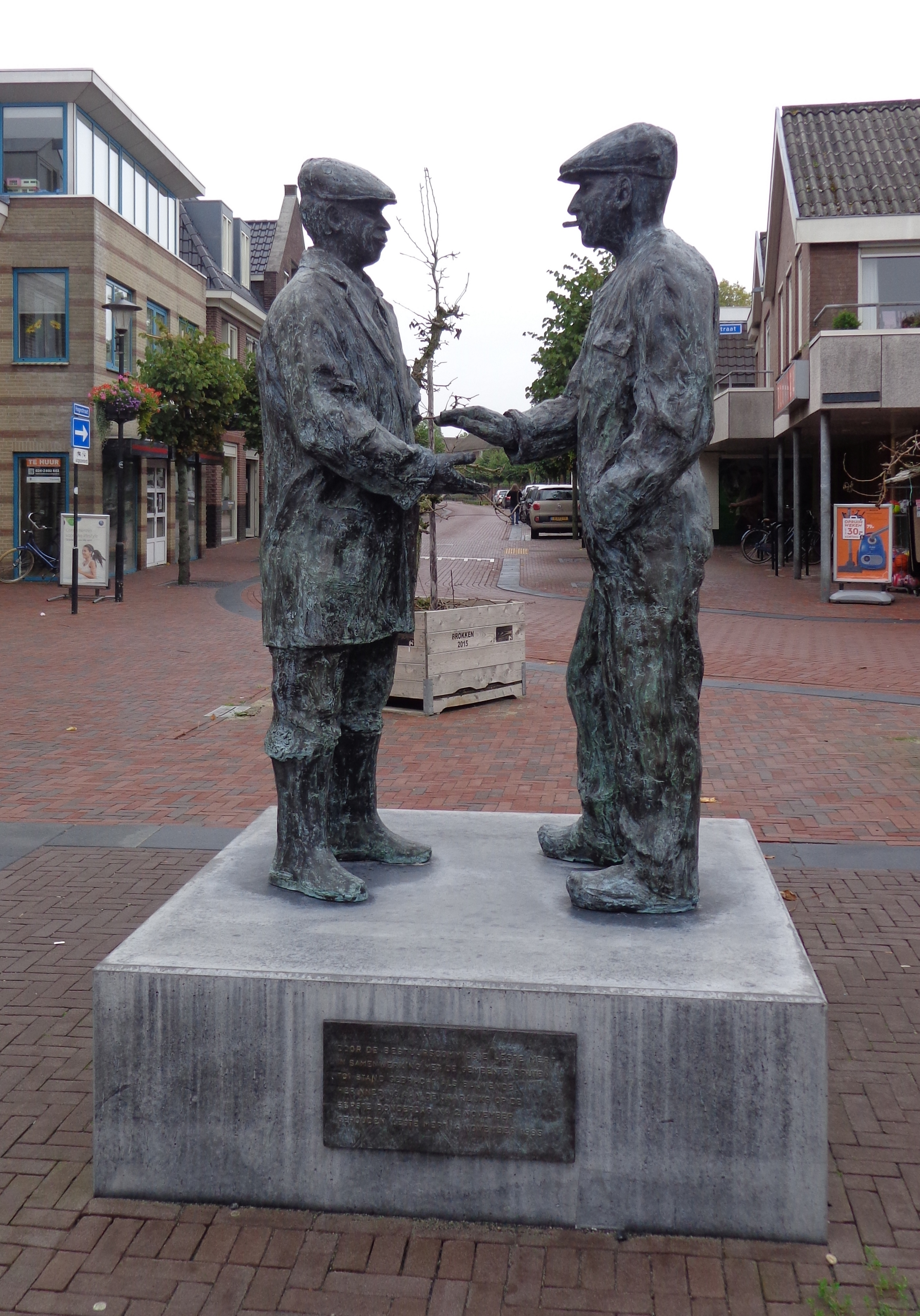
Druten Beeld Leste Mert

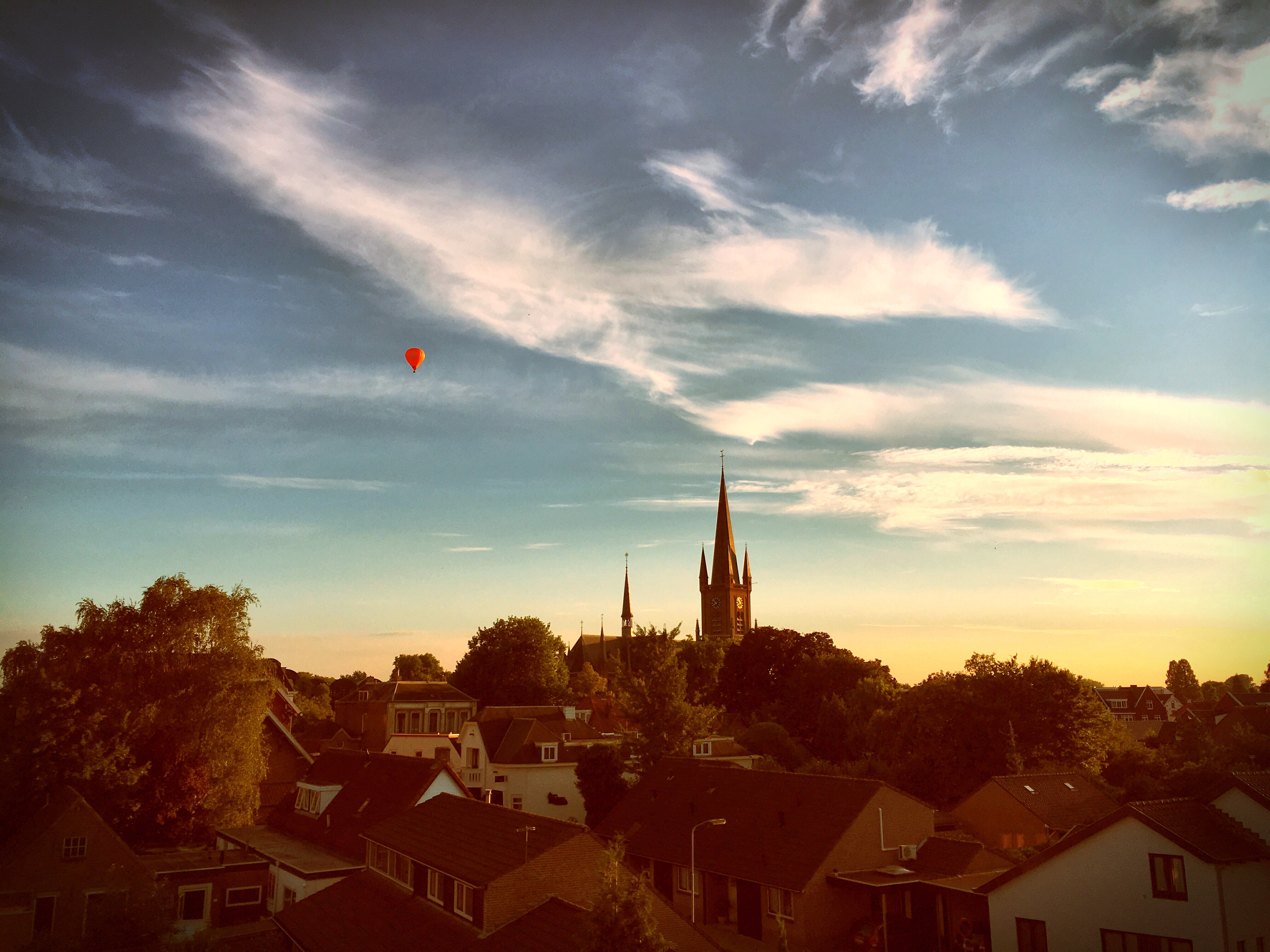
Druten in Het Land van Maas en Waal

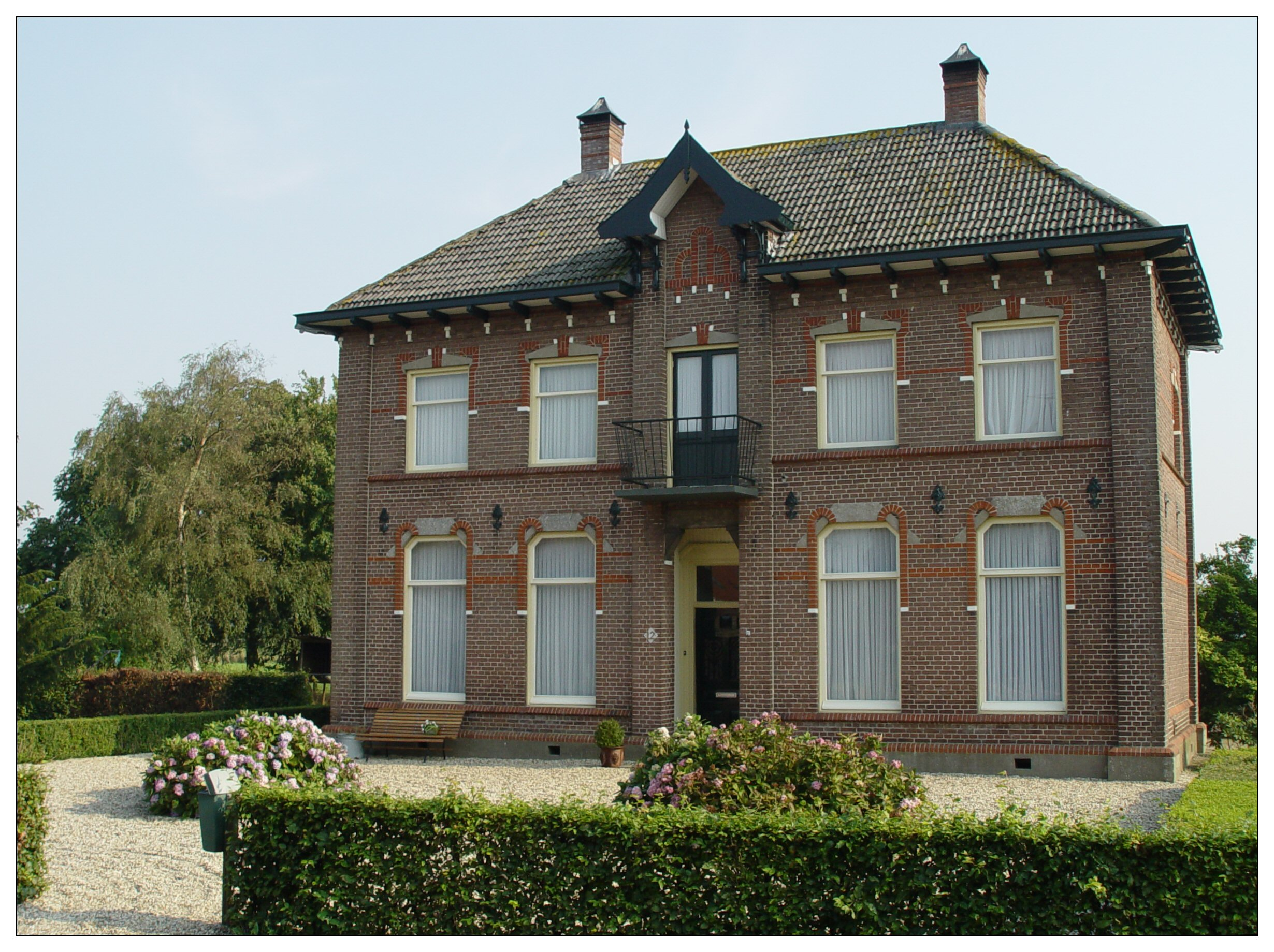
Op de grens- Afferden

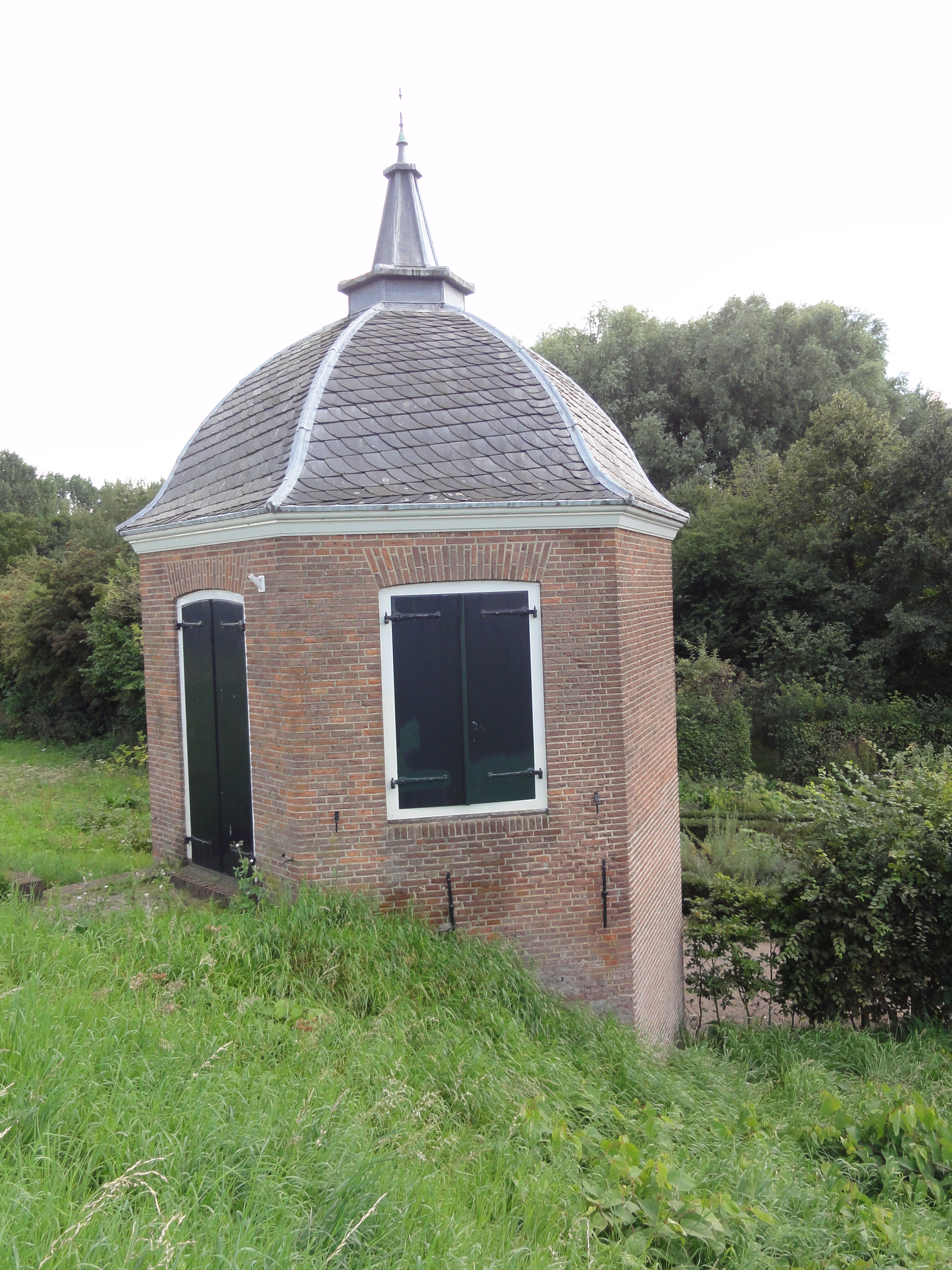
Rijksmonument Heemtuin Kiosk
