= Molenhoek (disambiguation) =

Molenhoek is a village located in the provinces of Limburg and Gelderland, Netherlands.

Molenhoek (Dutch pronunciation: [ˈmoːlə(n)ˌɦuk]) may also refer to:

- Molenhoek, Druten, Gelderland
- Molenhoek, Rosmalen, North Brabant
- Molenhoek, Overijssel
