= Molenhoek, Druten =

Molenhoek
- Hamlet
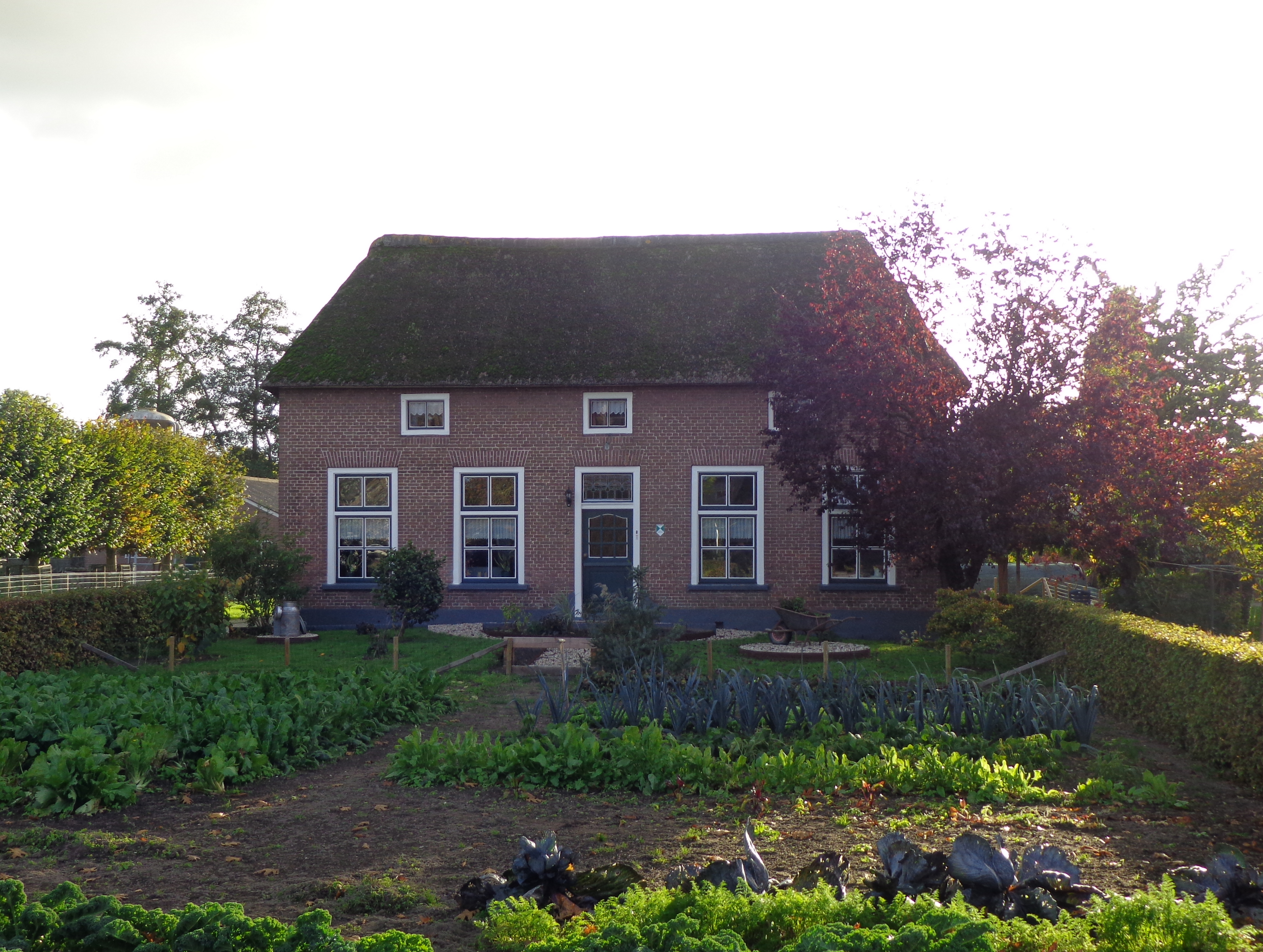
- Farm in Molenhoek

- Location in the Netherlands Molenhoek (Netherlands)
- Coordinates: 51°51′55″N 5°36′56″E
- Country: Netherlands
- Province: Gelderland
- Municipality: Druten

Area
  - Total: 0.42 km^{2} (0.16 sq mi)
- Elevation: 8 m (26 ft)

Population (2021)
  - Total: 130
  - Density: 310/km^{2} (800/sq mi)
- Time zone: UTC+1 (CET)
  - Summer (DST): UTC+2 (CEST)
- Postal code: 6631
- Dialing code: 0487

Molenhoek (Dutch pronunciation: [ˈmoːlə(n)ˌɦuk]) is a hamlet in the Dutch province of Gelderland. It is a part of the municipality of Druten, and lies about 11 km northwest of Wijchen.

It was first mentioned in 1899 as Molenhoek, and means "wind mill corner" after a wind mill which was demolished in 1922. The postal authorities have placed Molenboek under Horssen
