= Deest =

- Village
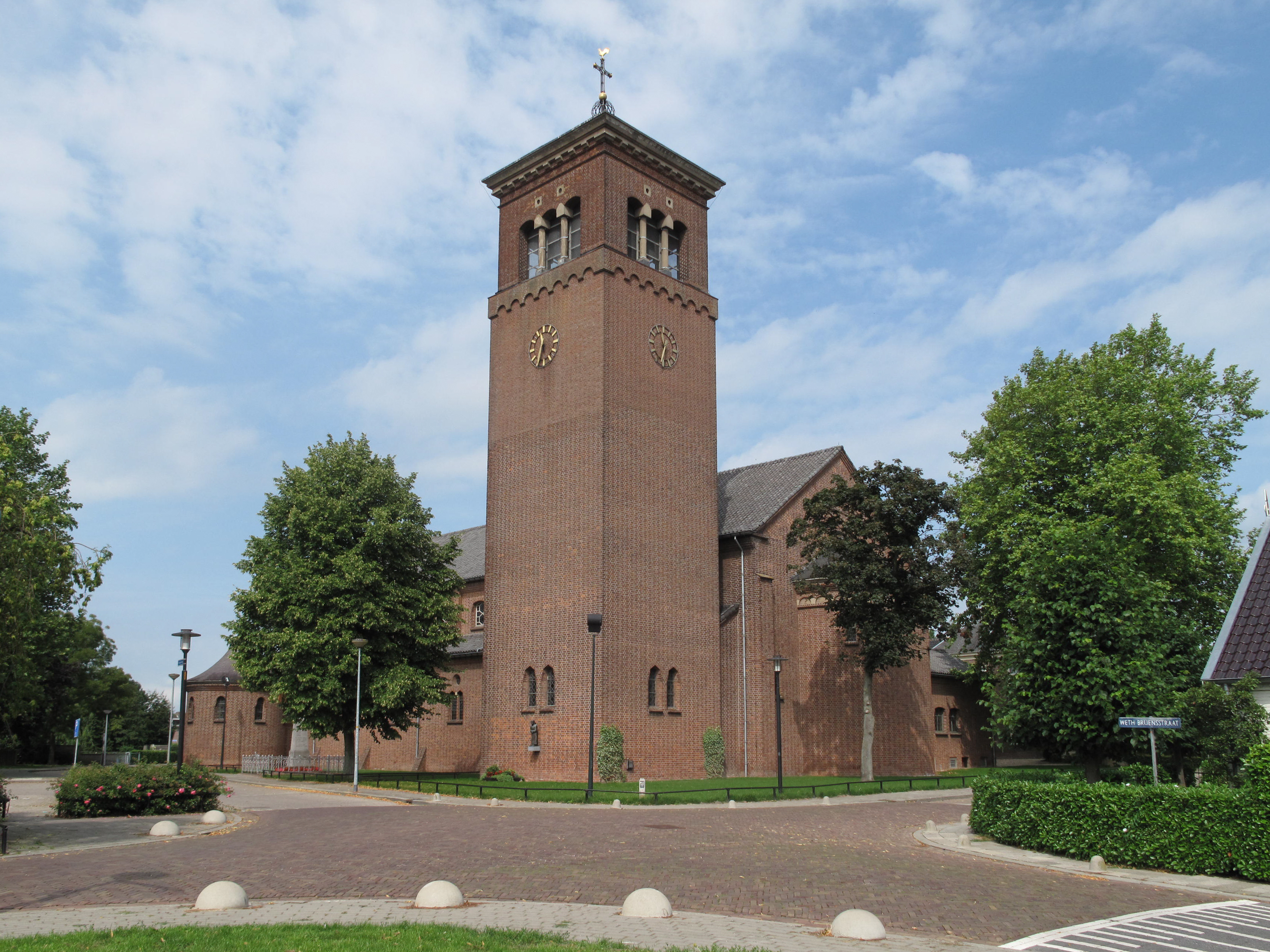
- Church of Deest

- Location in the Netherlands Deest (Netherlands)
- Coordinates: 51°53′N 5°40′E
- Country: Netherlands
- Province: Gelderland
- Municipality: Druten

Area
  - Total: 5.58 km^{2} (2.15 sq mi)
- Elevation: 8 m (26 ft)

Population (2021)
  - Total: 1,790
  - Density: 321/km^{2} (831/sq mi)
- Time zone: UTC+1 (CET)
  - Summer (DST): UTC+2 (CEST)
- Postal code: 6653
- Dialing code: 0487

Deest (Dutch pronunciation: [deːst]) is a village in the Dutch province of Gelderland. It is a part of the municipality of Druten, and lies about 9 km south of Wageningen.

== History ==
It was first mentioned in 814 as T(h)esta (CL I, no. 101) and 997 as Dheste. The etymology is unknown. In 1840, it was home to 451 people. Deest became an independent parish in 1858 when the first church was built. In 1919, the brickworks Vogelensangh opened, and is still in operation.

On 3 February 1945, the monastery was hit by a V-1 flying bomb killing seven sisters, two women and two children. On 8 February, another V1 hit the village killing 10 people. Most of the centre was destroyed. In 1953, the church was rebuilt.

== Gallery ==
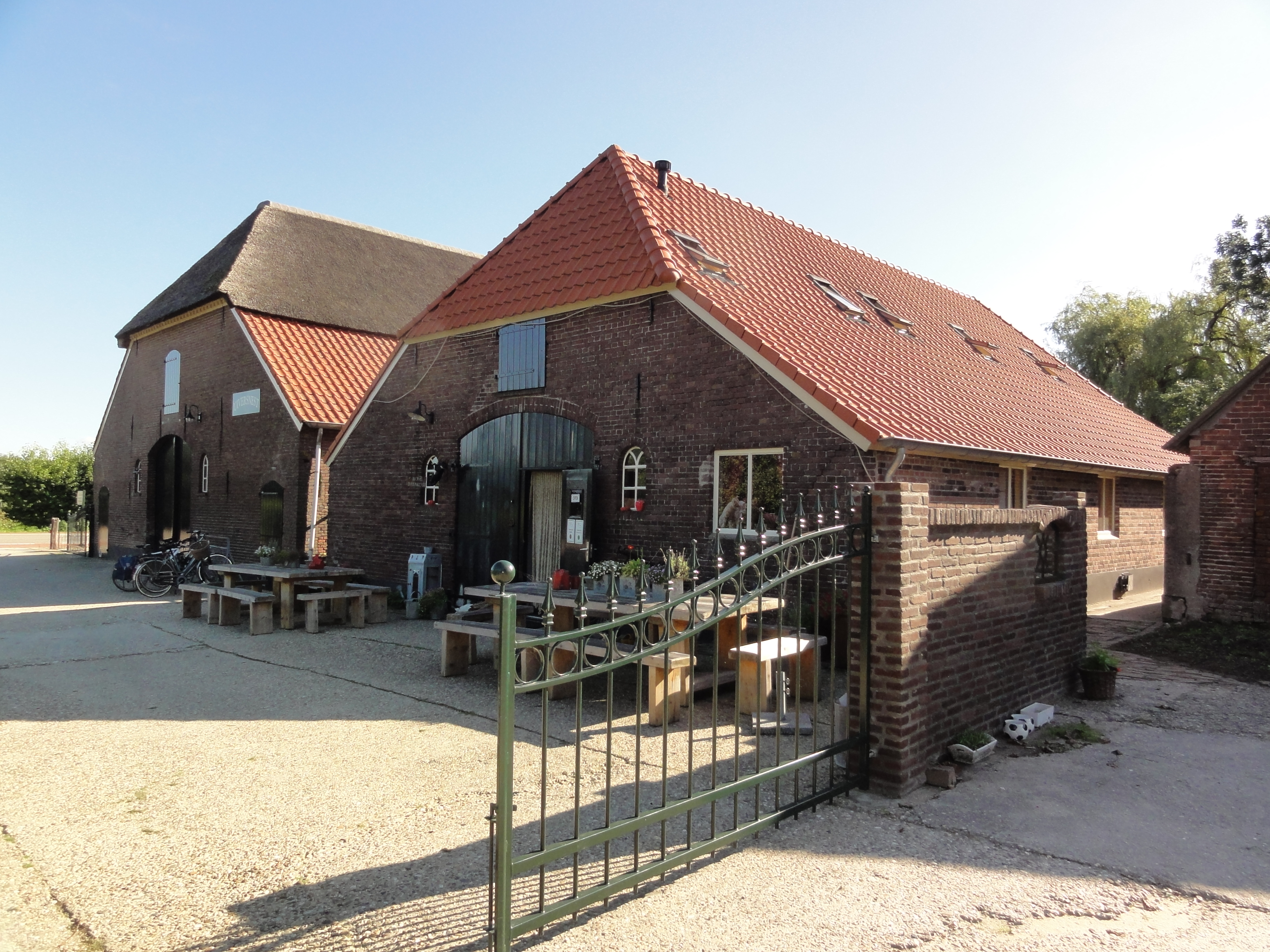
Barn in Deest

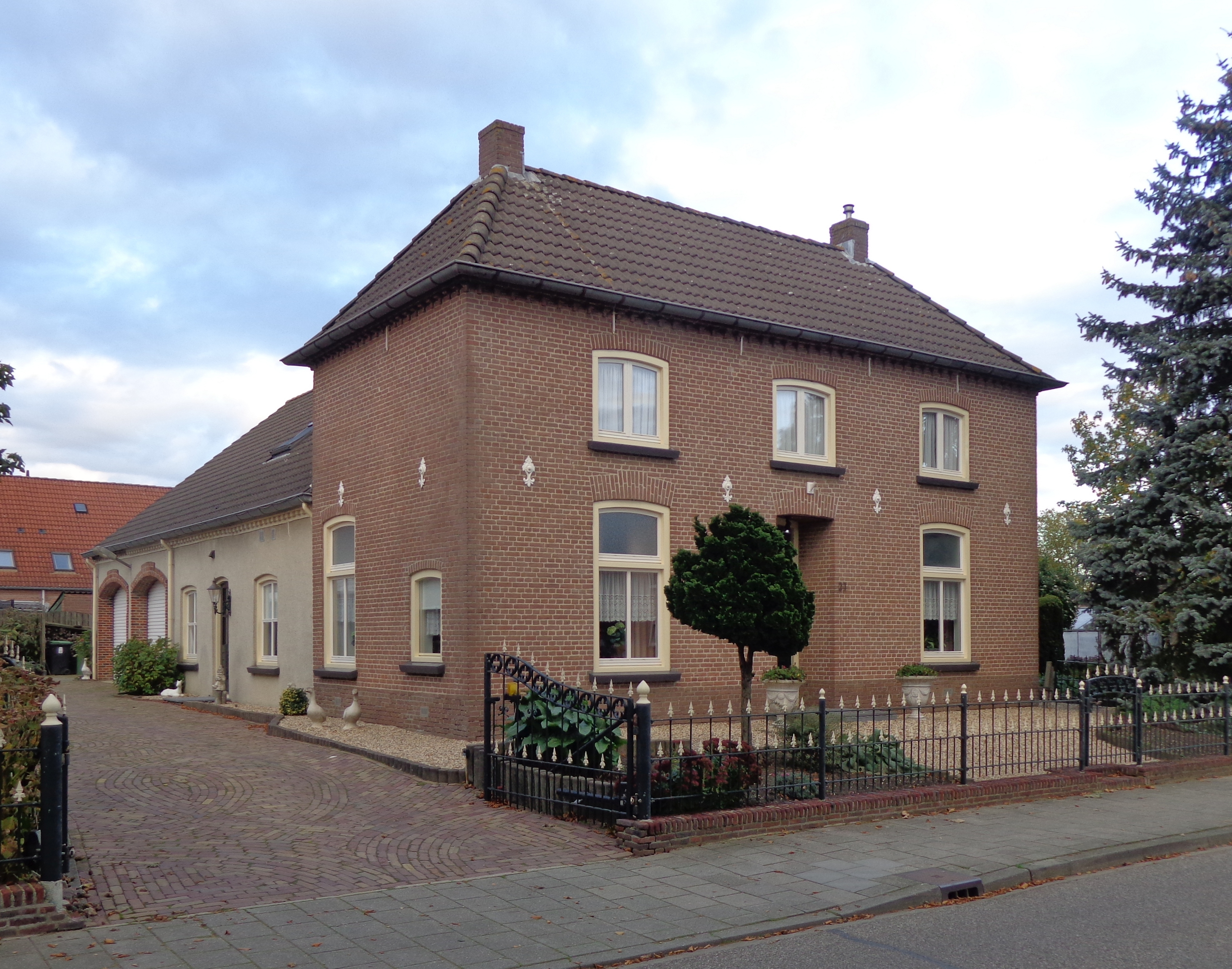
House in Deest

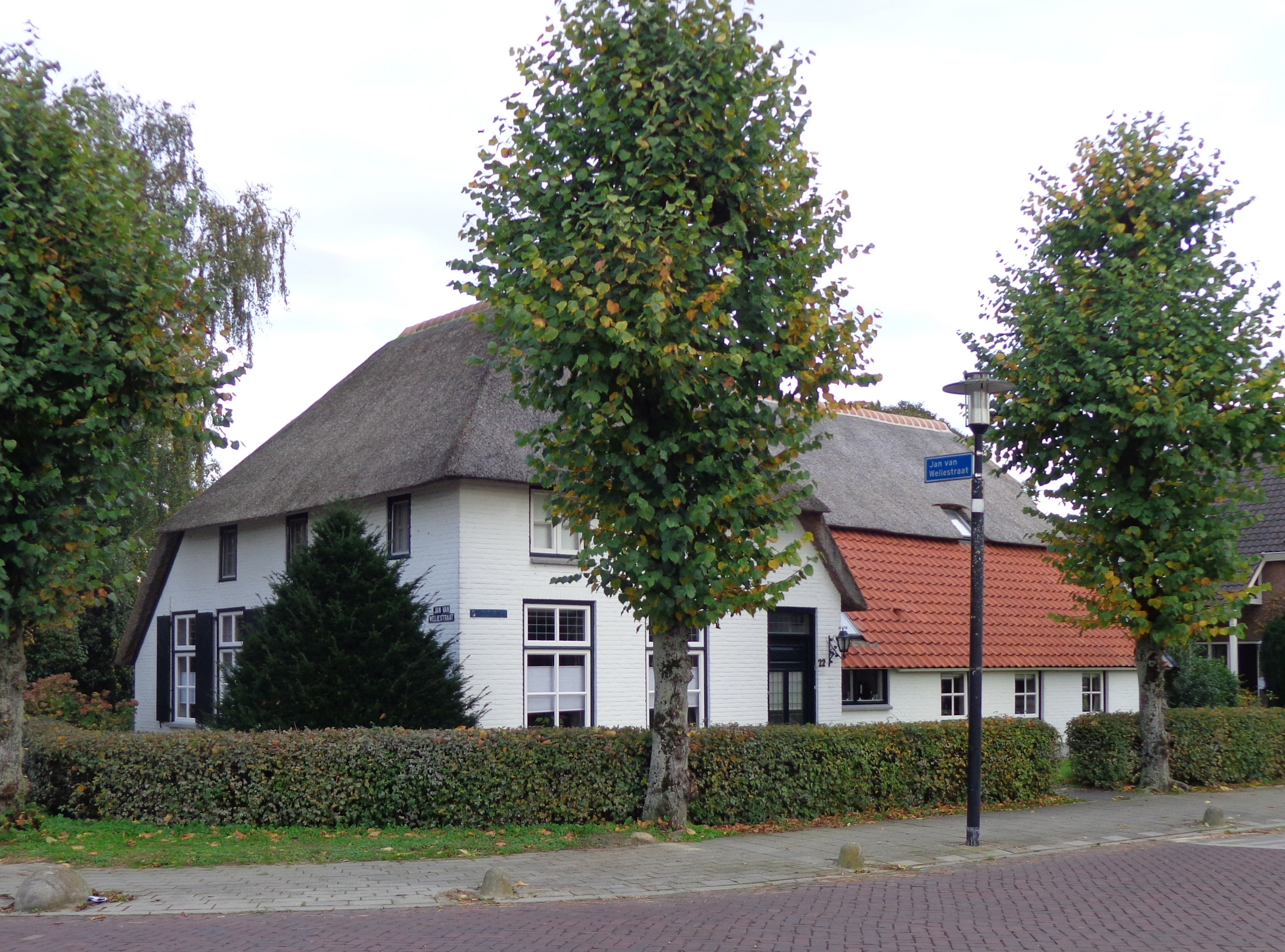
Farm in Deest

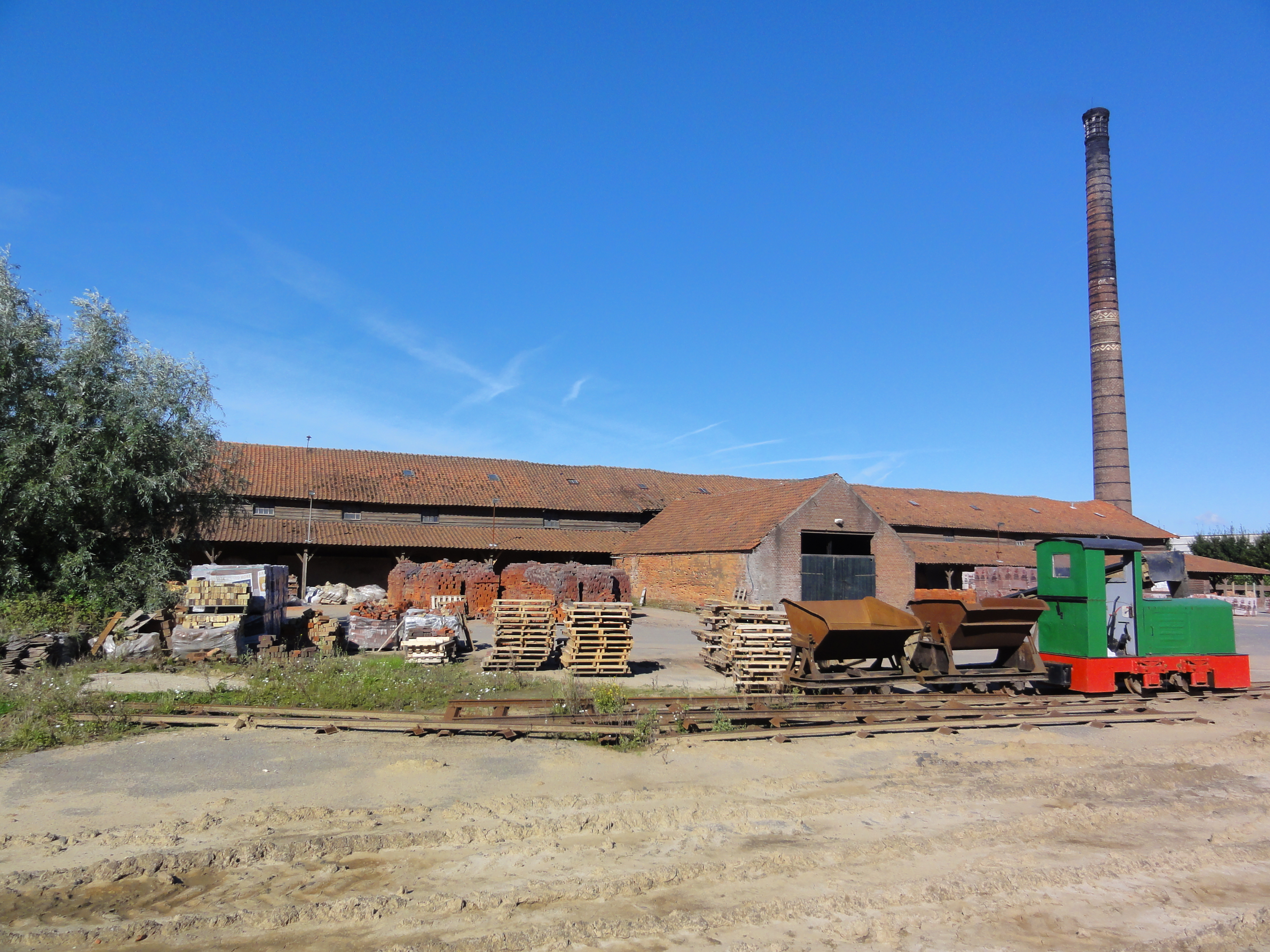
Brickworks
