= Ru Paré =

Former Dutch resistance member and visual artist

- Born: Henrica Maria Paré; 14 July 1896; Druten, Netherlands
- Died: 25 February 1972 (aged 75); The Hague, Netherlands
- Other name: Tante Zus
- Occupations: Visual artist; resistance member

Henrica Maria Paré (Druten, 14 July 1896 — The Hague, 25 February 1972) was a Dutch resistance member, and visual artist. Ru Paré found shelter and took care of 52 Jewish children, who all survived World War II.

== Biography ==
Henrica Maria Paré was born as the youngest of three children by Nicolaas Paré who owned a brickyard. She was usually called by her nickname Zus (sister). Paré had a talent for drawing from an early age, and when she moved to The Hague in 1919, she was instructed by the painter Albert Roelofs. The next year, she met the female singer Do Versteegh whom she befriended for life. She also participated in the painting classes at the Royal Academy of Art without enrolling, and was taught by Jan Toorop. From 1930 onwards, she signed her painting as Ru Paré. Paré exhibited her work in Amsterdam and The Hague. She quickly became a known figure in the artistic circles of The Hague, and became a member of the Haagse Kunstkring. Paré's work was included in the 1939 exhibition and sale Onze Kunst van Heden (Our Art of Today) at the Rijksmuseum in Amsterdam.

== World War II ==
On 20 June 1942, the Haagse Kunstkring sent a request to register at the Nederlandsche Kultuurkamer (a nazi organisation to which artists had to belong). She immediately revoked her membership. She had befriended Nico van der Veen who was in contact with the Utrecht Children’s Committee. Paré first started to find shelter for the two children of F.H. Lankhout, a printer from The Hague. Ultimately she managed to find shelter for 52 Jewish children. She used friends and acquaintances to find safe hiding places. Sometimes she had to travel as far as Boornbergum to find a hiding place for a child. She had created a false bottom in her painters box, and spend her days going back and forth with food, presents, money, and false papers. Paré had some contacts with the resistance, but mainly worked independently. All 52 children who knew her as Tante Zus (Aunt sister) survived World War II.

== After the war ==
After the war Paré moved into her parents' house together with Do Versteegh, and started painting again. She made sure that all children were taken care over. Nine children who had been orphaned were adopted by the Levin family who emigrated to Israel. Paré kept into contact with most of the children. She avoided publicity, and rarely talked about the past in the letters to the children. In 1968, Yad Vashem honoured Paré as Righteous Among the Nations at the nomination of the Levin family. She testified in 1970 at the Weinreb investigation of the NIOD that she had saved 52 children.

Do Versteegh died in 1970. On 25 February 1972, a friend discovered Ru Paré's body in the bathroom.

== Aftermath ==
In 1988, The Hague named a street Ru-Paréstraat.

In Amsterdam, the Ru Paré Community, a school and neighbourhood centre has been named after her.

In 2020, The Hague named a school after Ru Paré. The renaming was a request of the politician Hanneke Gelderblom who - as a child - was taken from The Hague to Eerde by Ru Paré.
