= Puiflijk =

Puiflijk Pufluk
- Village
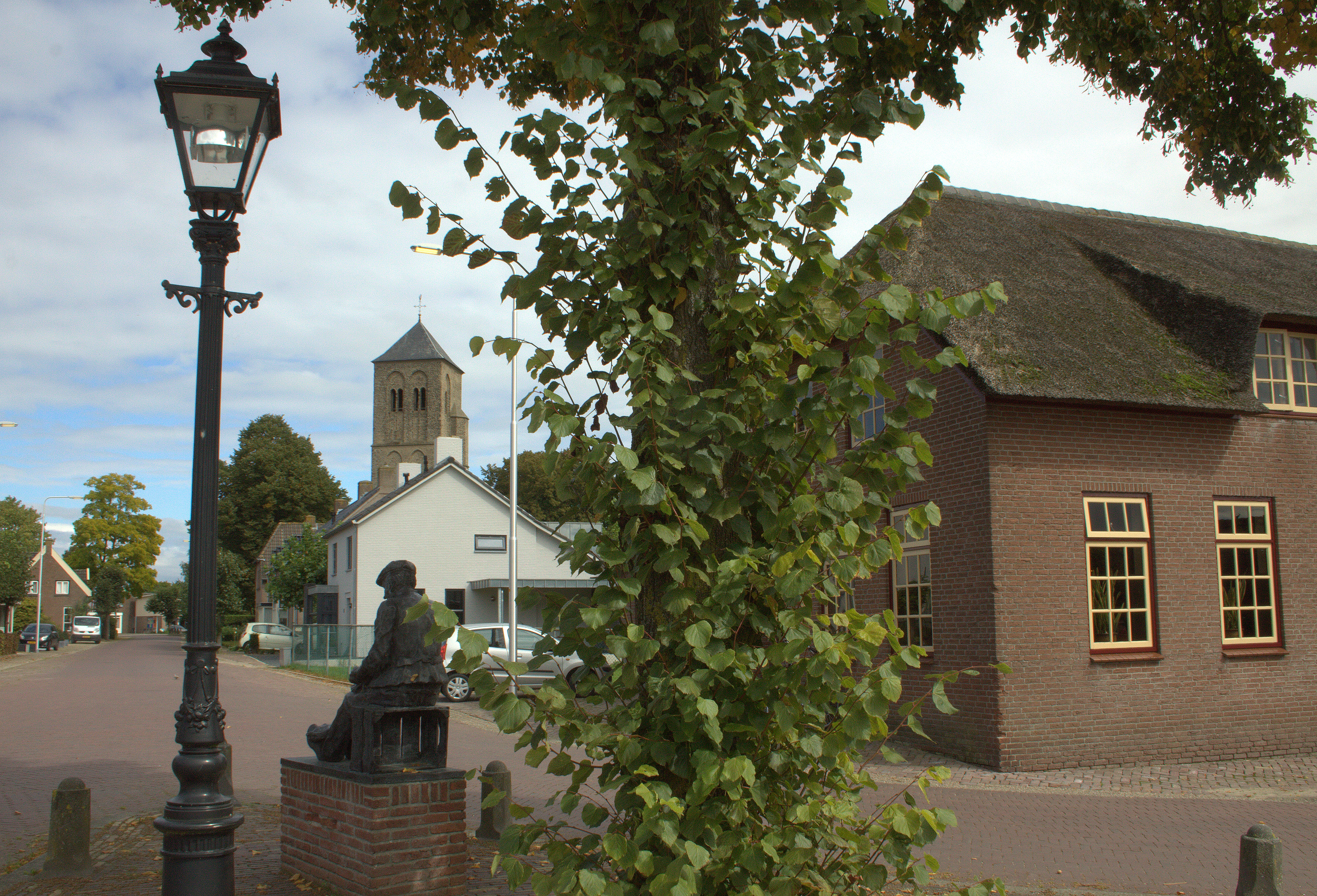
- Centre of the village

- Location in the Netherlands Puiflijk (Netherlands)
- Coordinates: 51°53′N 5°35′E
- Country: Netherlands
- Province: Gelderland
- Municipality: Druten

Area
  - Total: 5.54 km^{2} (2.14 sq mi)

Population (2021)
  - Total: 1,290
  - Density: 233/km^{2} (603/sq mi)
- Time zone: UTC+1 (CET)
  - Summer (DST): UTC+2 (CEST)
- Postal code: 6655
- Dialing code: 026

Puiflijk (Dutch pronunciation: [ˈpœy̯flək]) is a village in the Dutch province of Gelderland. It is a part of the municipality of Druten, and lies about 12 km south of Wageningen.

Puiflijk was a separate municipality until 1818, when it was merged with Druten.

== History ==
It was first mentioned in 1108 as Puueke. The etymology is unknown. The village is located on some small hills. The Old Tower is a church tower from the 15th century. The church was heavy damaged around 1800 during the French occupation, and was demolished in 1855 leaving only the tower. The St. John the Baptist church was built between 1868 and 1870.

The area around Puiflijk was suitable for growing tobacco, and a tobacco industry developed in the village. In 1840, Puiflijk was home to 468 people.

== Gallery ==
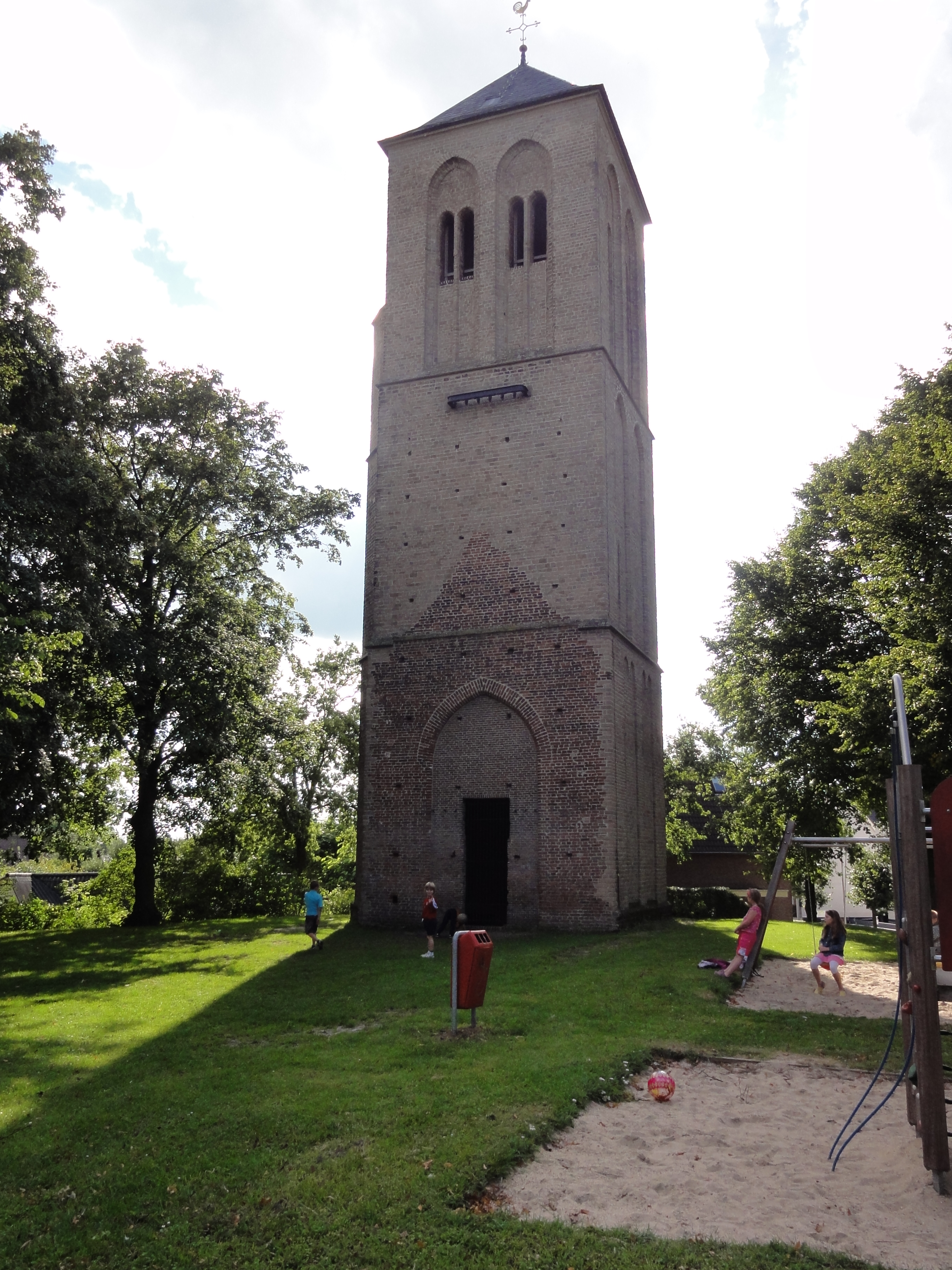
Church tower

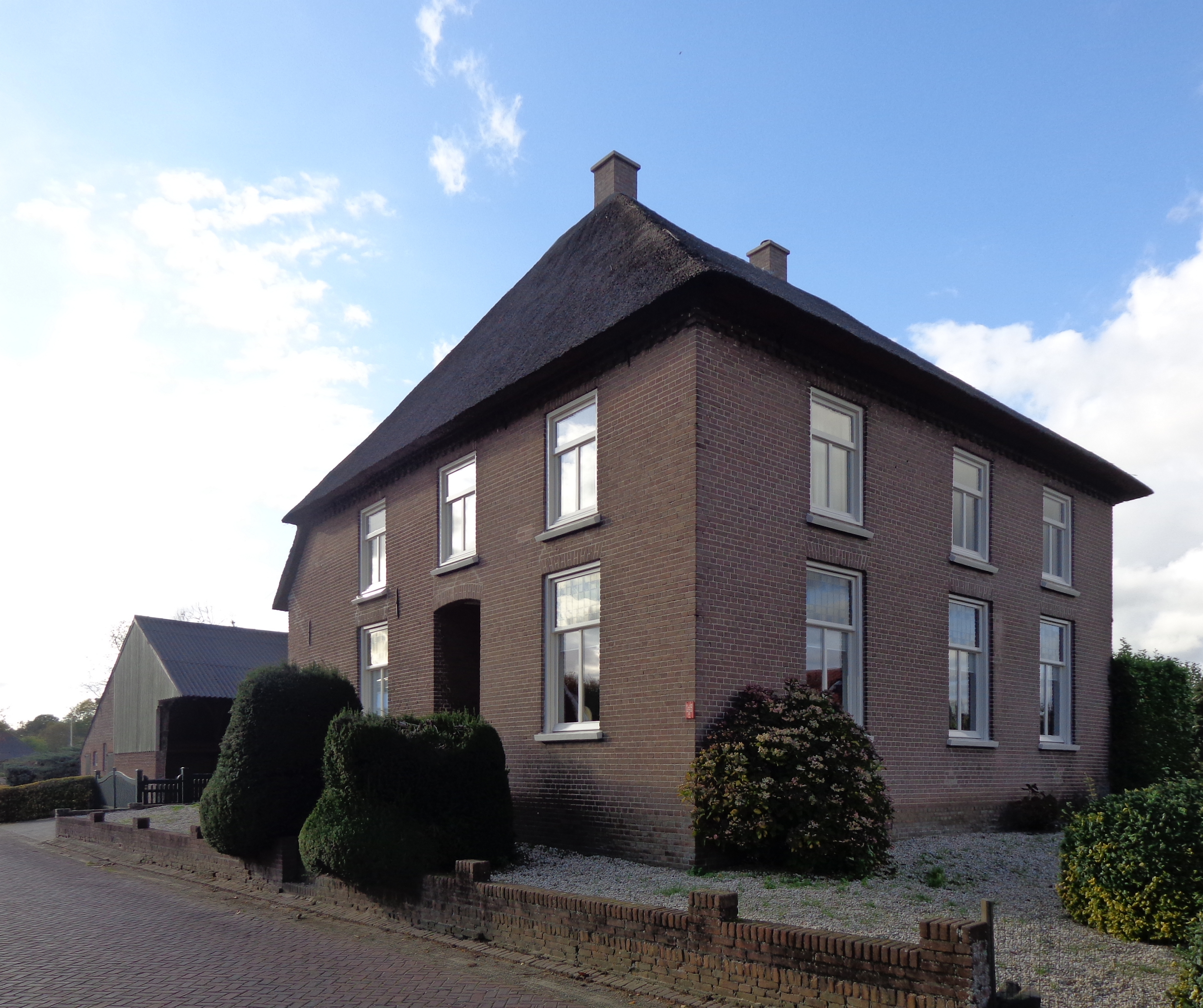
House in Puiflijk

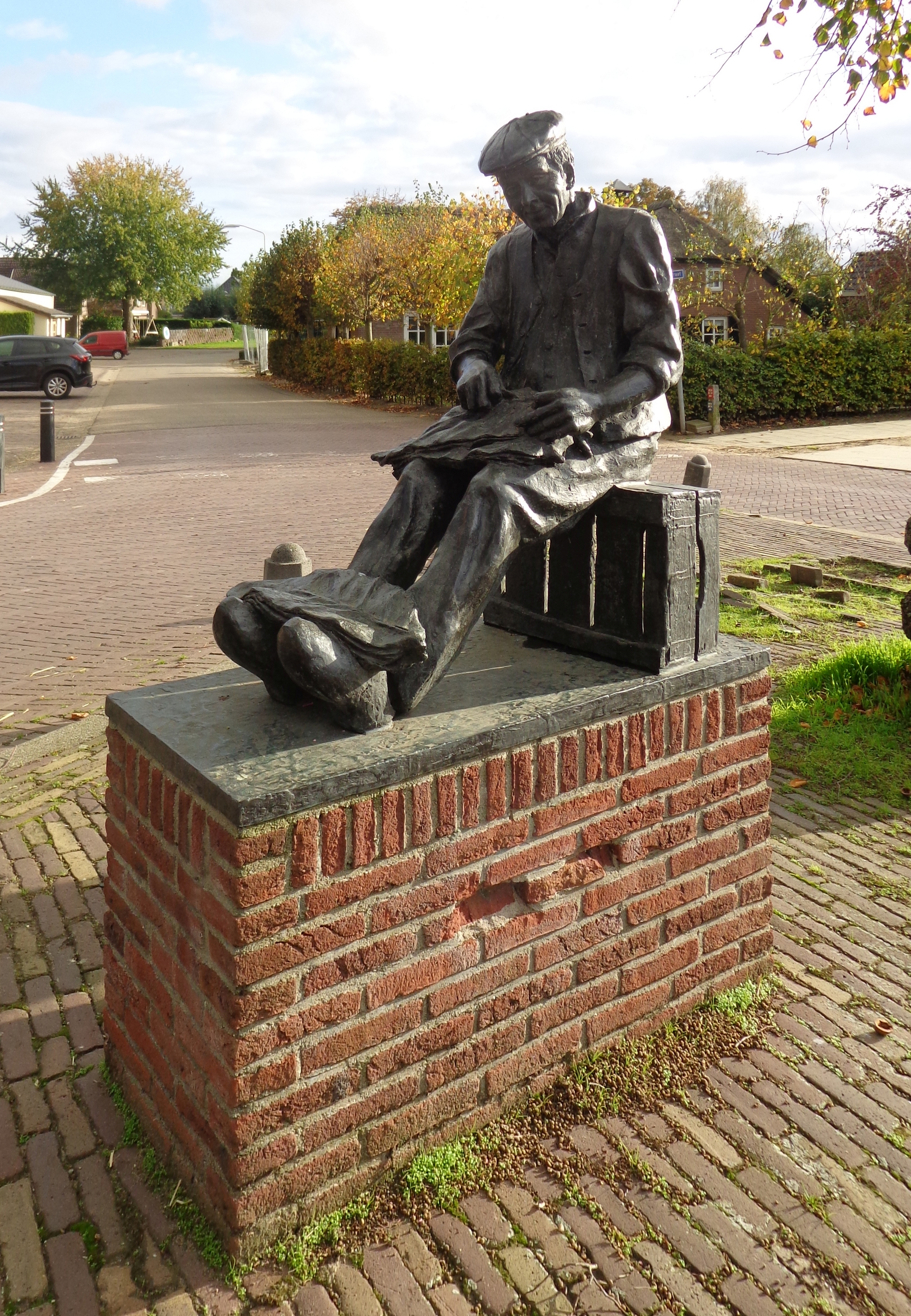
The tobacco cutter by Humphrey Dirks

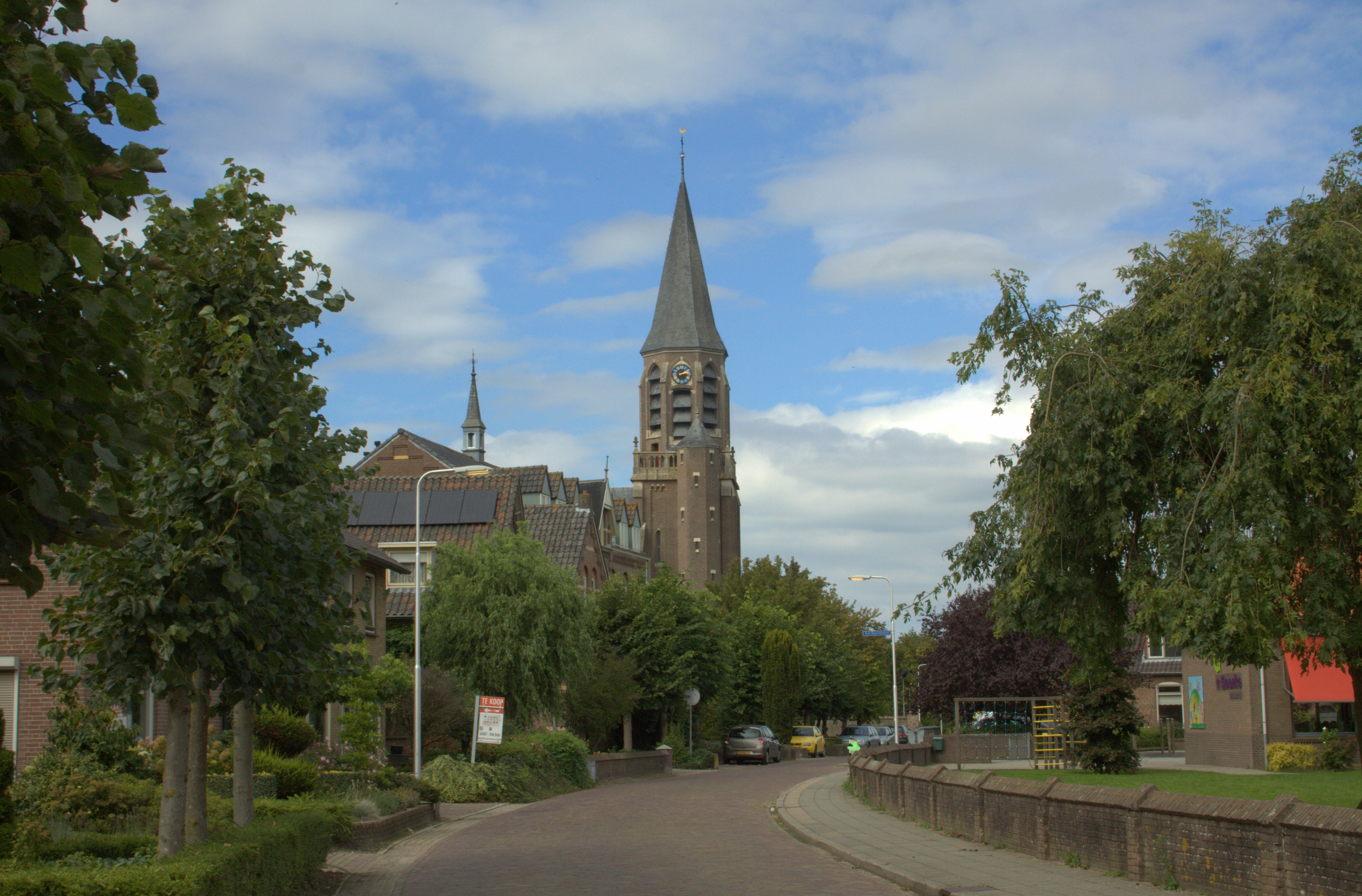
John the Baptist Church
