= Pieter Roelofs =

Art historian and curator

- Born: 1972 (age 53–54)
- Education: Radboud University
- Occupations: curator, art historian

Pieter Roelofs (born 1972) is a Dutch art historian working for the Rijksmuseum in Amsterdam as head of paintings and sculpture. He specialises in Dutch Golden Age painting, particularly Rembrandt van Rijn.

Roelofs studied history of art at the Radboud University in Nijmegen. After finishing his study, he worked as curator at the Valkhof Museum in Nijmegen. In 2006 he started working at the Rijksmuseum. In 2019 he led the restoration of Rembrandt's The Night Watch. Using new scanning techniques the Rijksmuseum team discovered a preparatory sketch underneath the paint, which Roelofs said shows how Rembrandt searched for the right composition. In an interview with the BBC Roelofs compared Rembrandt to a dance choreographer who grabs the viewer's eye and moves it through the composition.

Roelofs was responsible for the largest Johannes Vermeer exhibition ever, which ran from February until June 2023. The exhibition attracted the highest number of visitors in the museum’s history. The authenticity of three of the paintings included in the exhibition is disputed, including the Girl with a Flute, owned by the National Gallery of Art in Washington, DC. The gallery concluded in 2022 that its painting is a work by an associate of Vermeer, but Roelofs has said in interviews that he believes it to be a real Vermeer: "The doubt disappears somewhere during the flight over the ocean."

Roelofs was a judge in the Dutch reality TV programmes Project Rembrandt, De Nieuwe Vermeer, and De Gezonken Meesters.
