= Horssen =

- Village
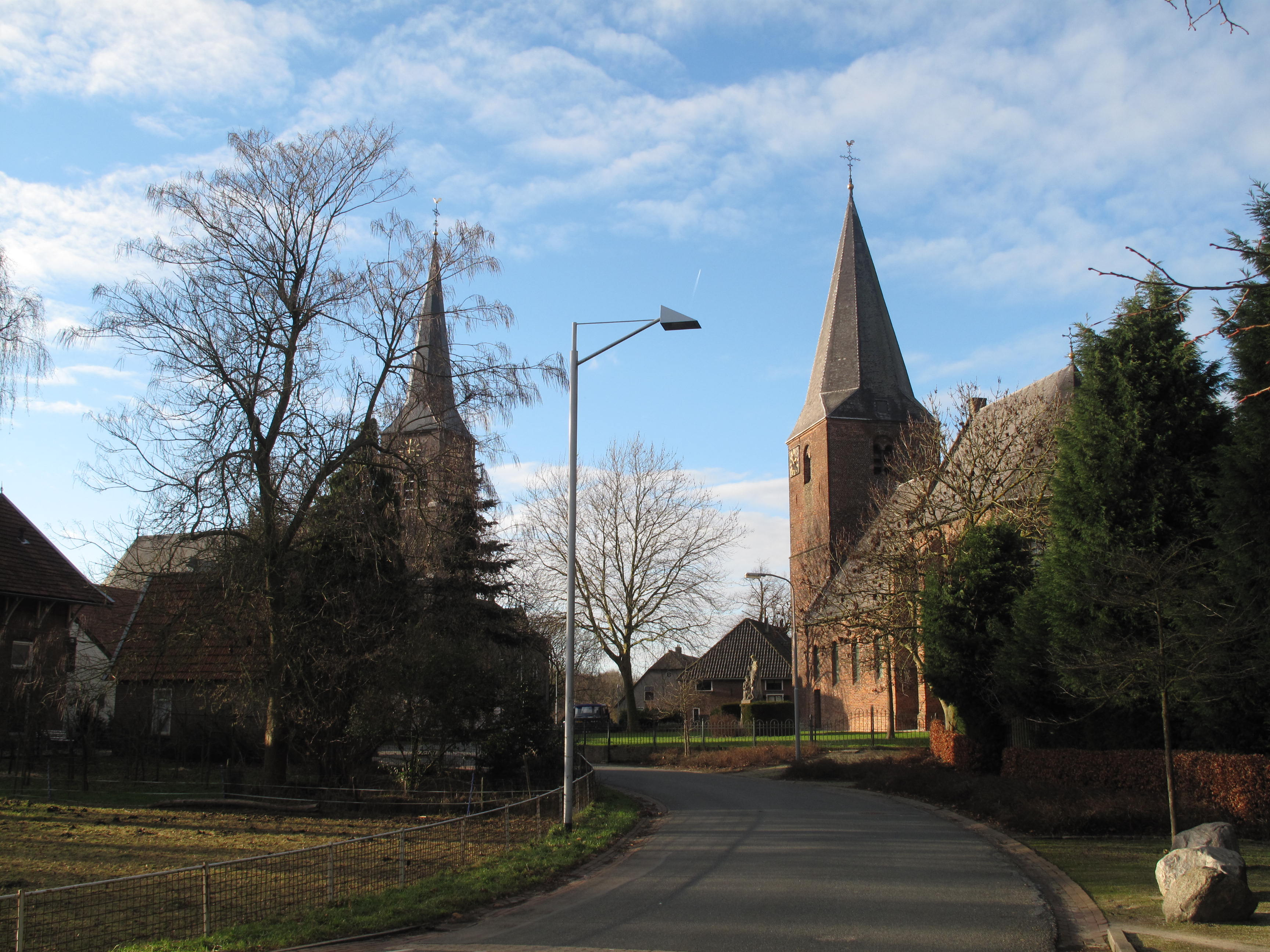
- Two churches in Horssen

- Coat of arms

- Location in the Netherlands Horssen (Netherlands)
- Coordinates: 51.8555°N 5.6072°E
- Country: Netherlands
- Province: Gelderland
- Municipality: Druten

Area
  - Total: 12.5 km^{2} (4.8 sq mi)
- Elevation: 8 m (26 ft)

Population (2021)
  - Total: 1,610
  - Density: 129/km^{2} (334/sq mi)
- Time zone: UTC+1 (CET)
  - Summer (DST): UTC+2 (CEST)
- Postal code: 6631
- Dialing code: 0487

Horssen (Dutch pronunciation: [ˈhɔrsə(n)]) is a village in the Dutch province of Gelderland. It is a part of the municipality of Druten, and lies about 10 km northwest of Wijchen.

Horssen was a separate municipality until 1984, when it was merged with Druten.

== History ==
It was first mentioned in 1242 as "de Horsne". The etymology is unclear. The village developed on a sand hill. It contains three churches close to one another. The Saint Boniface Church was a tower from the 14th century. The current church dates from the 19th century. The Dutch Reformed Church was built from 1821 to 1822. The Saint Anthony church has built from 1909 to 1910.

Huis te Horssen was a manor house from the 17th century. It was demolished in 1879 and replaced by a farm which was remodelled into an estate. It used to be owned by the Jurgens family, one of the founders of Unilever. In 2004, it was restored to its original condition. In 1840, Horssen was home to 813 people.

== Notable people ==
- Merel Smulders (born 1998), BMX rider

== Gallery ==
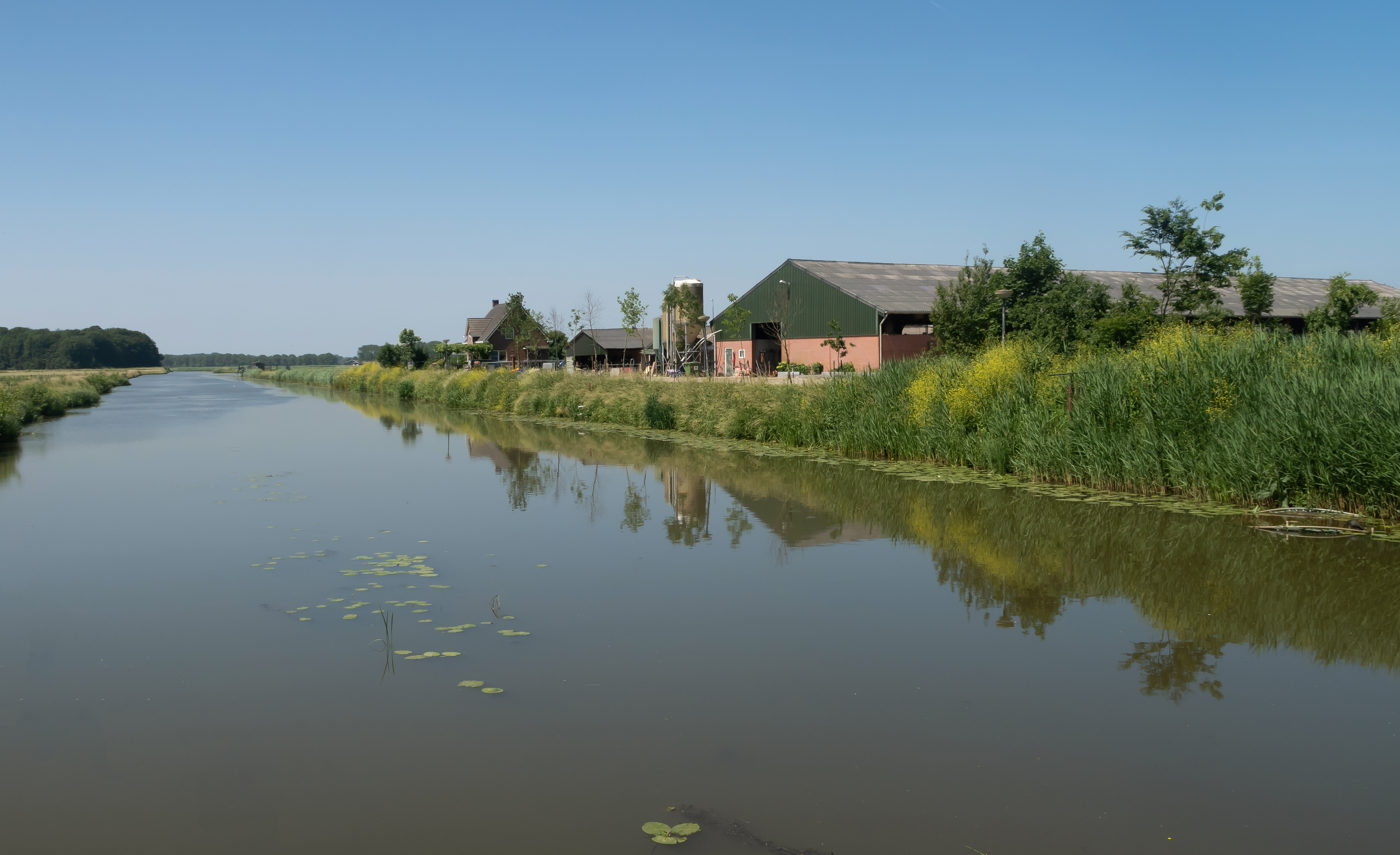
Agricultural company in the polder between Horssen and Hernen

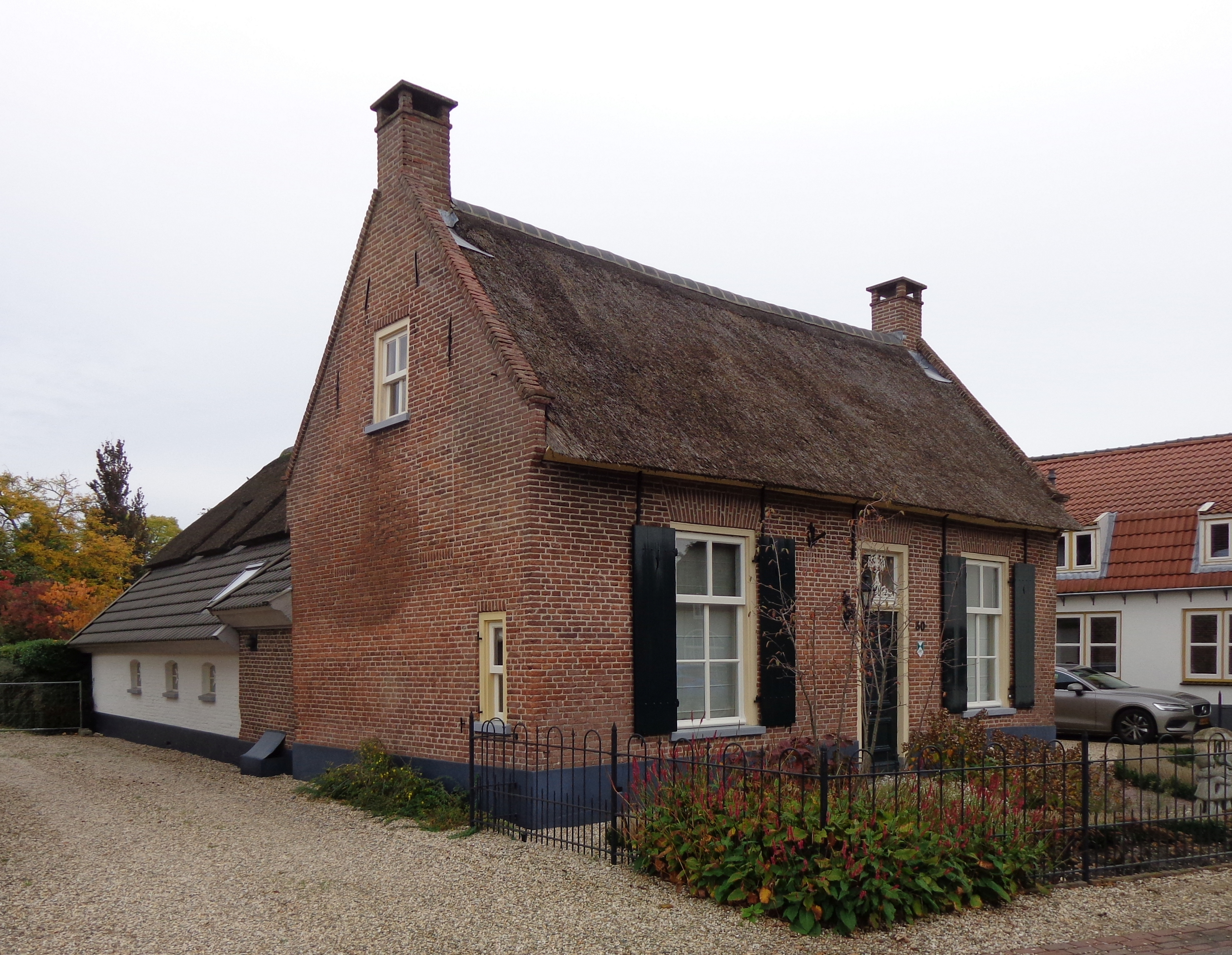
House in Horssen

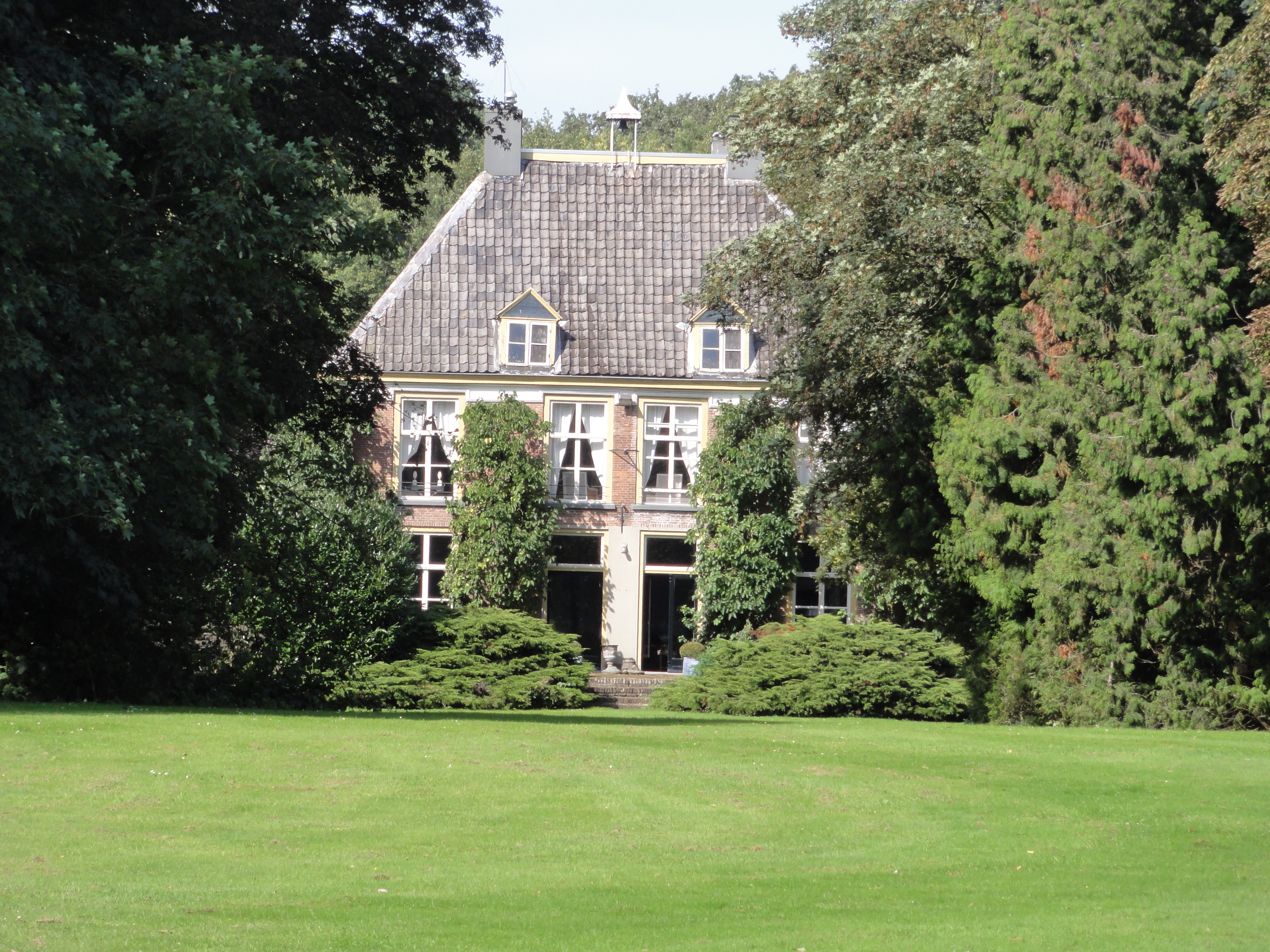
Huis te Horssen

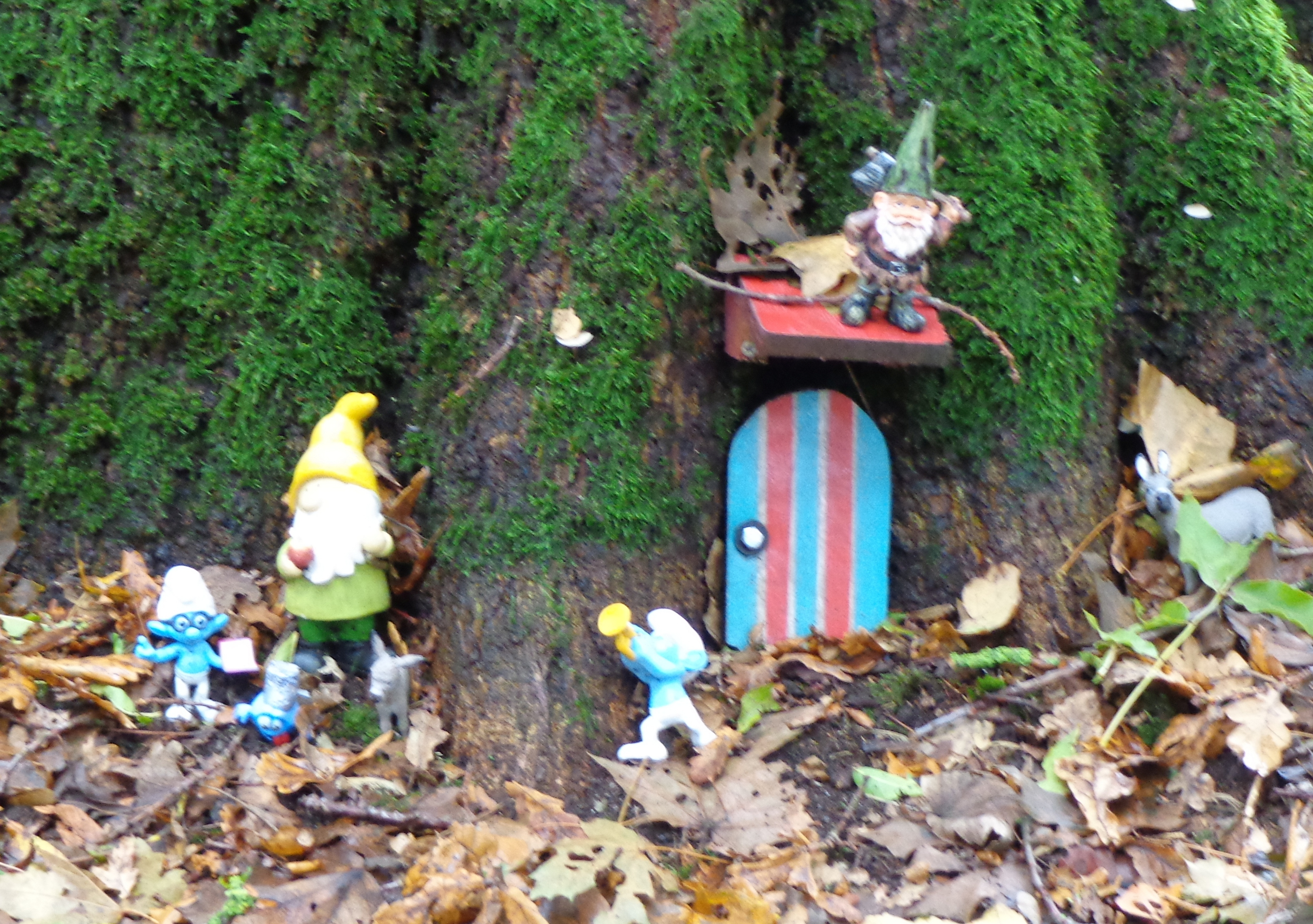
Gnomes and smurfs
